= Tsozong Gongba Monastery =

Tibetan Buddhist monastery on Tashi Island, Tibet

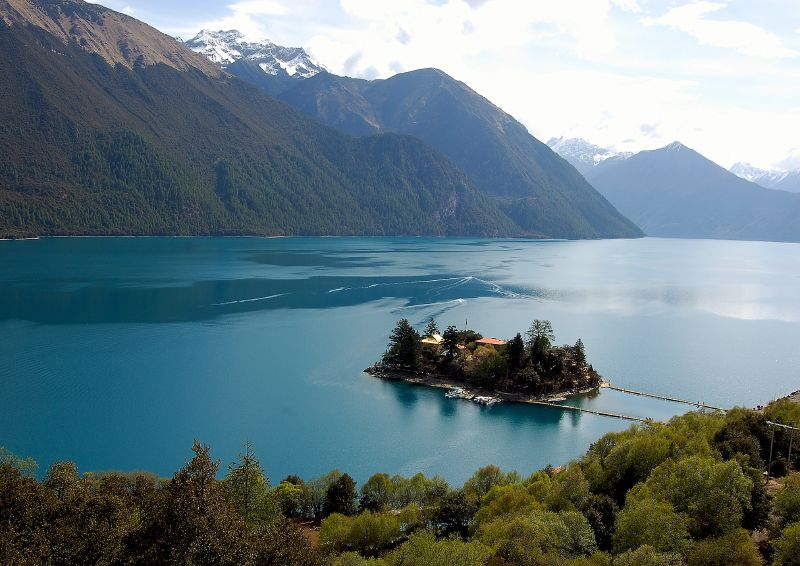
- Tsozong Gongba Monastery in Pagsum Lake

- Location in Tibet Tsozong Gongba Monastery (China)

Religion
- Affiliation: Tibetan Buddhism
- Sect: Nyingma

Location
- Location: Gongbo'gyamda County, Nyingchi Prefecture, Tibet Autonomous Region
- Country: Tibet
- Interactive map of Tsozong Gongba Monastery
- Coordinates: 30°00′33″N 93°54′58″E

Architecture
- Established: 1400; 626 years ago

Tsozong Gongba Monastery (also romanized as Tsodzong or Tsomum) is a small Tibetan Buddhism monastery in eastern Tibet. The monastery, founded in 1400, practices the Nyingma tradition. Tsozong Gongba is located on Tashi Island (Chinese: 扎西岛; pinyin: Zhāxī Dǎo) in the middle of Pagsum Lake in the Nyenchen Tanglha Mountains, part of Gongbo'gyamda County in Nyingchi Prefecture, Tibet Autonomous Region. Tsozong Gongba means "castle in the lake" in Tibetan. The monastery has four buildings situated around a small yard.

The construction of the Tsozong Gongba Monastery was chaired by the Nyin-gma-pa monk Sungye Lingpa and is now home of a few nuns.

The three statues (Chenresig, Guru Rimpoché and Sakya Thukpa, see below) were actually shot and burned by the People's Liberation Army (PLA) during the Cultural Revolution, before being restored by the local lama Dudjom Rimpoche and his son Chuni Rimpoche (now a resident at Lamaling Monastery near Bayi town). A small kora around the monastery passes several hard-to-discern holy sites, including a Sky burial site, a 'body-print' of Gesar.

== Gallery ==
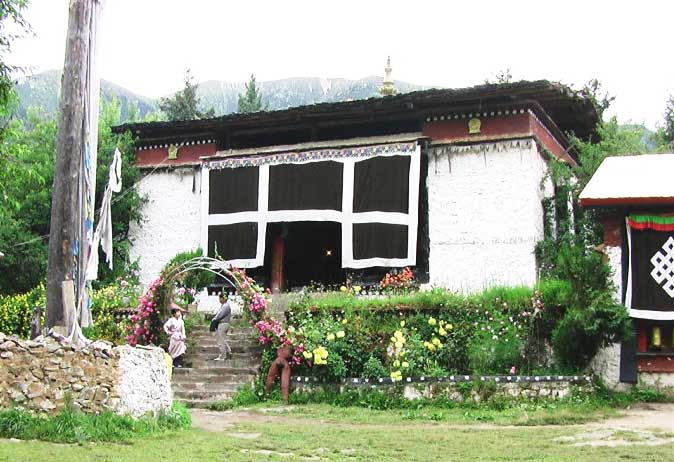
Tsozong Gongba Monastery main building.

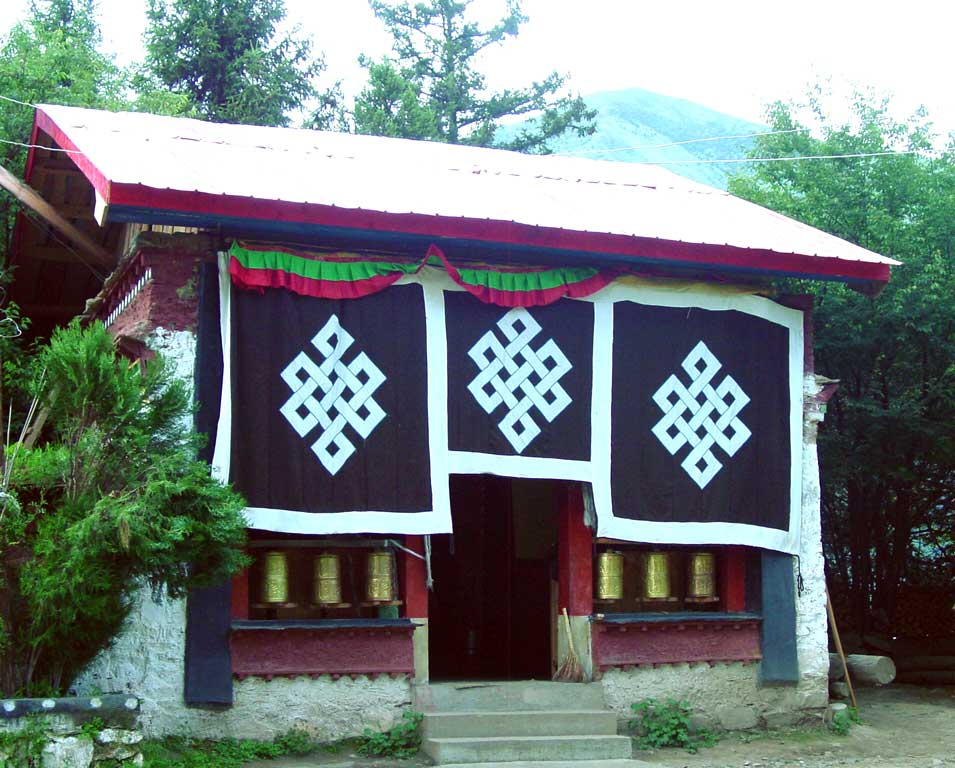
Tsozong Gongba Monastery auxiliary building with 3 'endless knots' above the door.

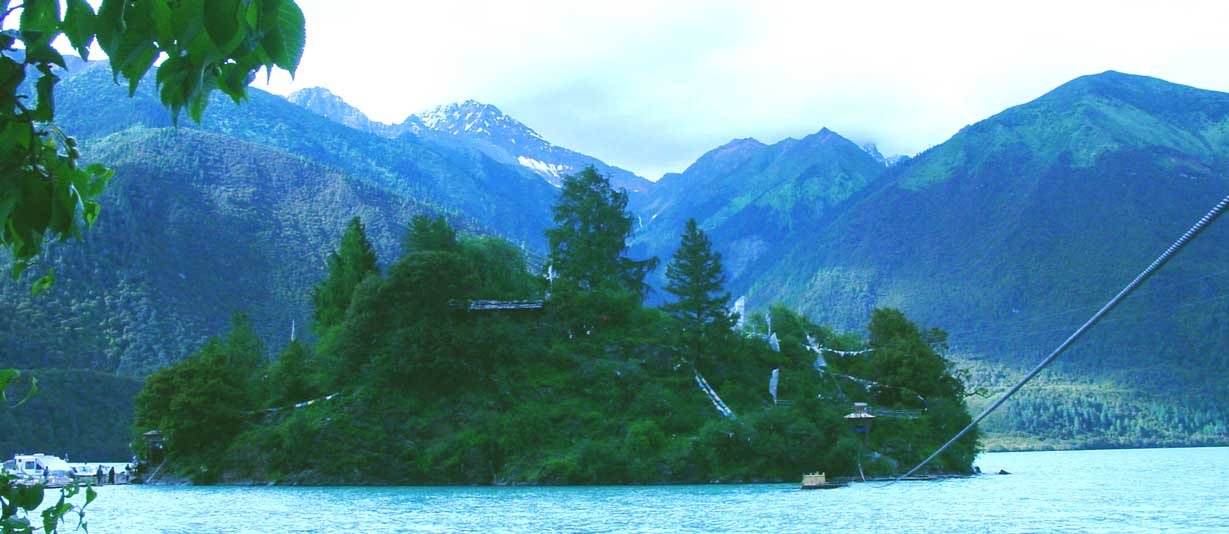
Tashi Island in the middle of the Basum Tso.

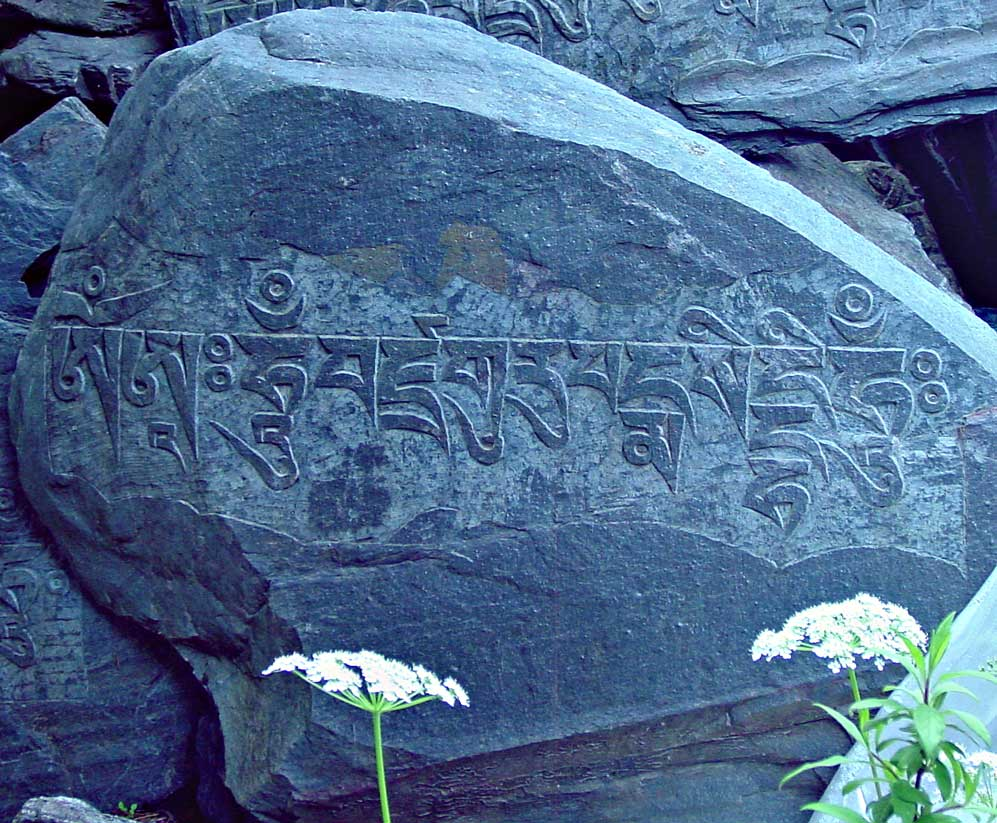
Om mani padme hum -variation of the six syllable mantra of Avalokiteshvara. is inscribed in Tibetan script on this rock behind the main building.

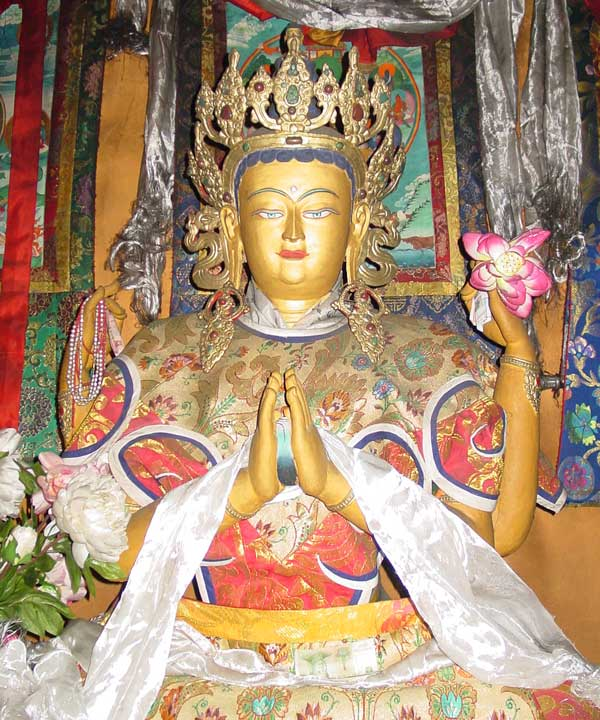
Avalokiteshvara (or Avalokiteśvara, in Tibetan - Chenresig) - statue in the main building.

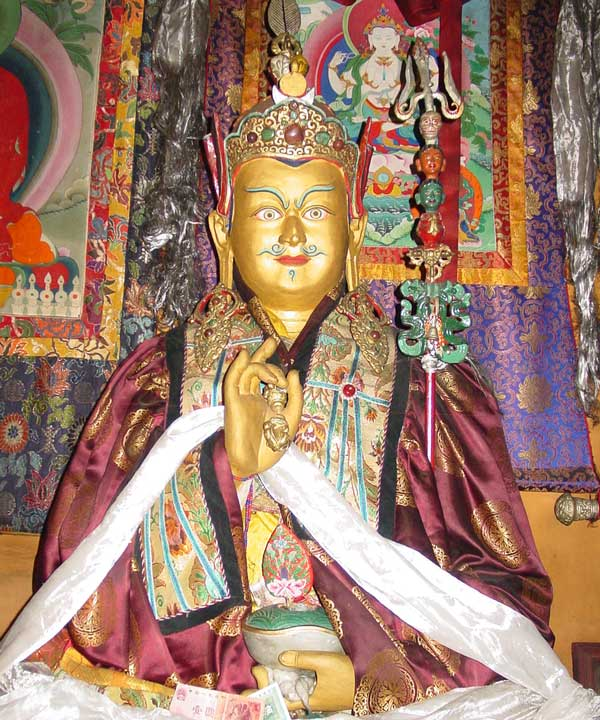
Padmasambhava (or Guru Rimpoché) - statue in the main building.

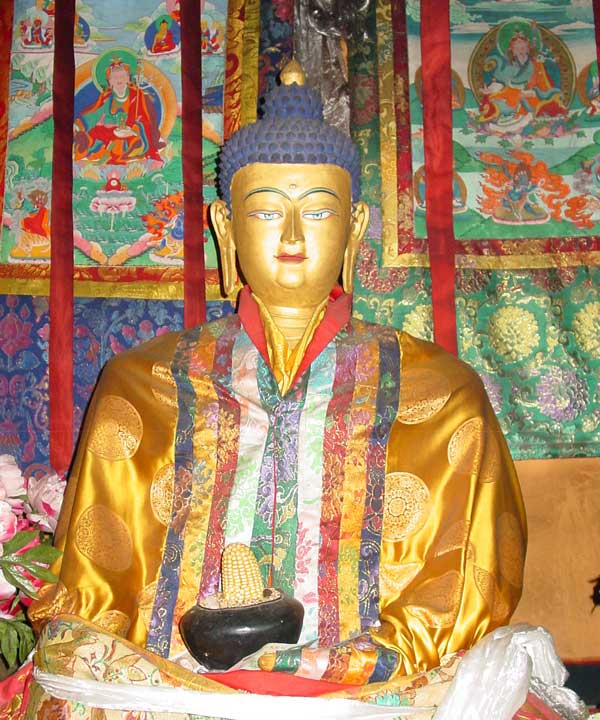
Buddha Shakyamuni (Sakya Thukpa) - statue in the main building.

== See also ==
- List of Buddhist temples
- List of Tibetan monasteries
