= List of towns in Tibet by elevation =

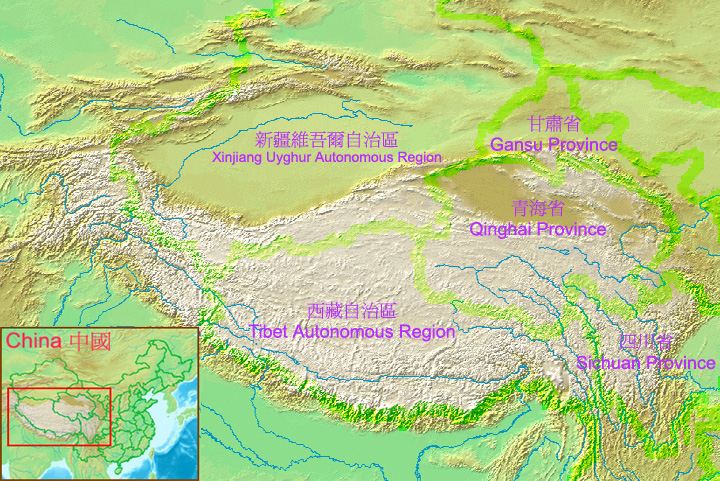
Relief map of the Tibetan Plateau

The Tibetan Plateau is a plateau in southern Central Asia. It is the highest plateau in the world, with an average elevation of 4,500 meters and covering an area of roughly 2.5 million square kilometres.

== Qinghai ==
City / Prefecture	County	Town	Altitude in meters	Altitude in feet
Xining	Chengzhong District	None	2,299	7,543
Haibei Tibetan Autonomous Prefecture	Haiyan County	Chengguan Town	3,070	10,072.2
Haibei Tibetan Autonomous Prefecture	Gangca County	Shaliuhe	3,235	10,613.5
Haixi Mongol and Tibetan Autonomous Prefecture	Delingha	NA	2,945	9,662

== Sichuan Province ==
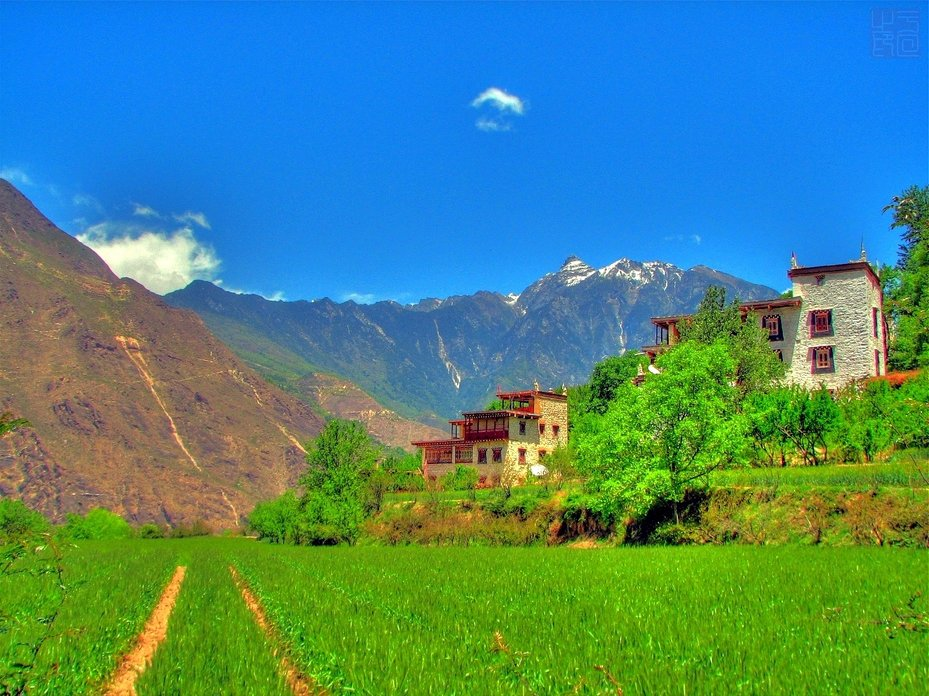
Garzê Tibetan Autonomous Prefecture

City / Prefecture	County	Town	Altitude in meters	Altitude in feet
Garzê Tibetan Autonomous Prefecture	Kangding County	Lucheng	2,480	8,136.5
Garzê Tibetan Autonomous Prefecture	Ganzi County	Sie	4,411	14,472
Garzê Tibetan Autonomous Prefecture	Luding County	Luqiao	1,330	4,363.5
Aba Tibetan and Qiang Autonomous Prefecture	Maerkang	城关镇	2,653	8,704

== Tibet Autonomous Region ==
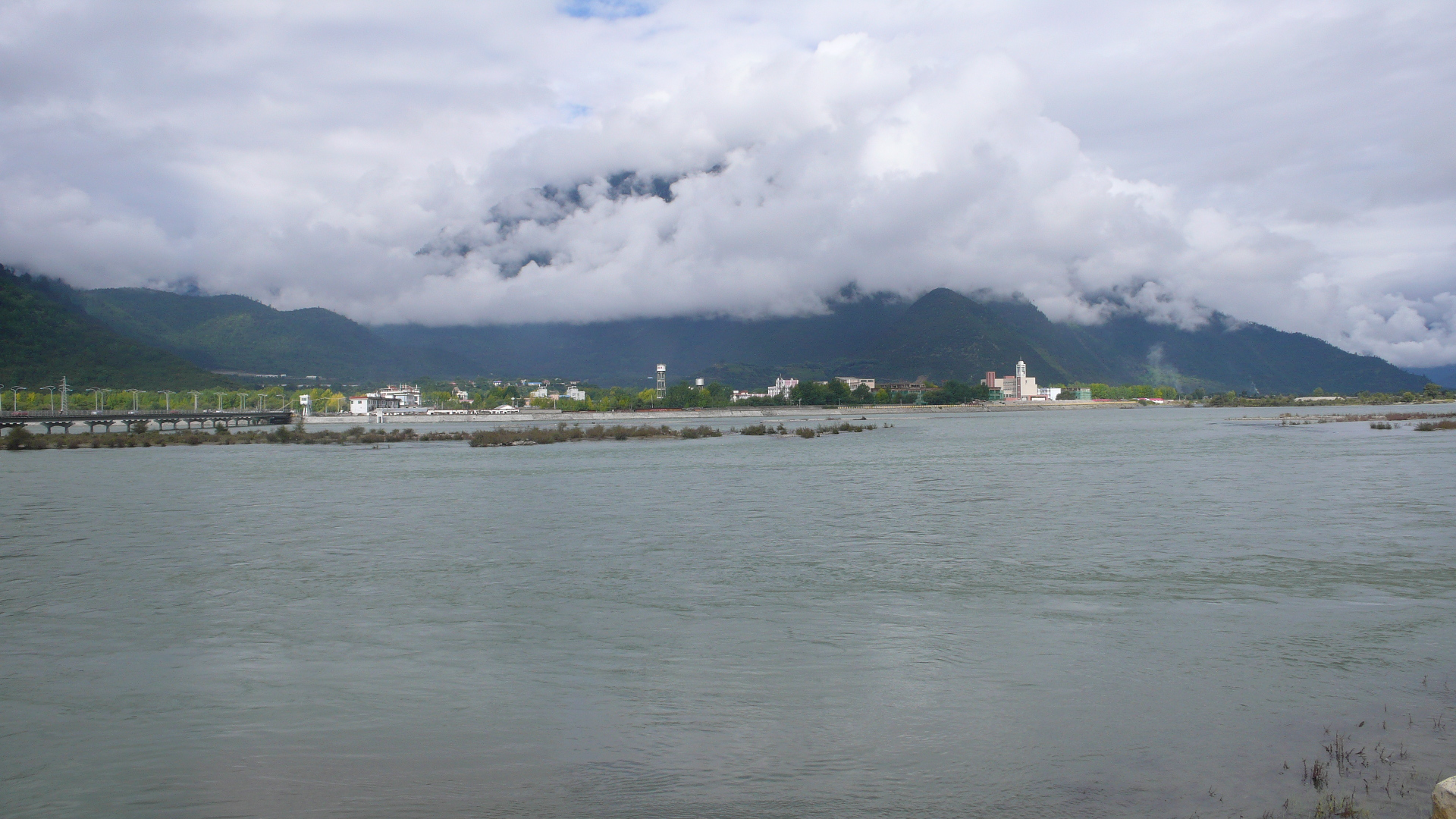
View of Bayi Town (altitude of 3000 meters) from the Niyang River

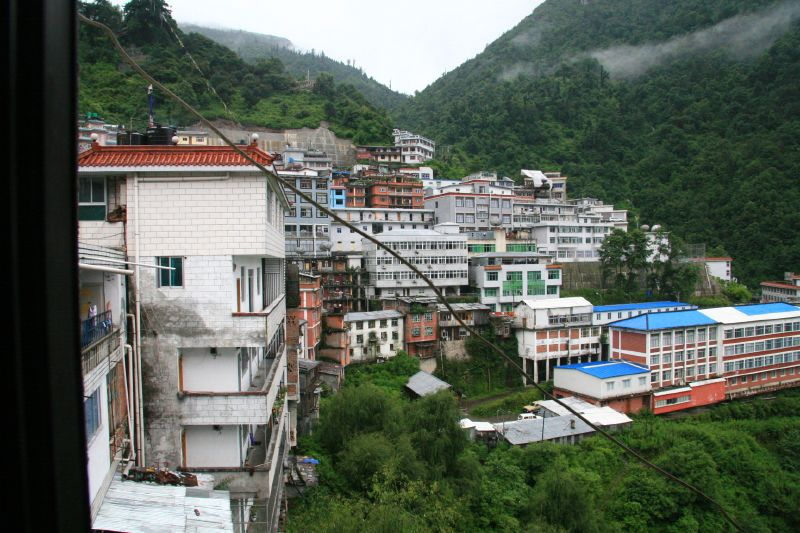
The hillside town of Zhangmu (altitude of 2300 meters)

City / Prefecture	County	Town	Altitude in meters	Altitude in feet
Lhasa	Chengguan District	无	3,650	11,975
Lhasa	Dagzê County	Deqing	3,706	12,158.8
Lhasa	Maizhokunggar County	工卡镇	3,830	11,089.2
Lhasa	Damxung County	公塘镇	4,302	13,786.1
Lhasa	Dangxiong	Yangbajain	4,288	14,068.2
Nyingtri Prefecture	Nyingchi County	Bayi Town	3,000	9,842.5
Nyingtri Prefecture	Nyingchi County	Nyingchi Town	3,020	9,908.1
Nyingtri Prefecture	Gongbo'gyamda County	城关镇	3,440	11,286.1
Nyingtri Prefecture	Bomi	扎木镇	2,750	9,022.3
Nyingtri Prefecture	Bomi	排龙乡	2,030	6,660.1
Qamdo Prefecture	Qamdo County	Qamdo	4,334	14,219
Qamdo Prefecture	Baxoi County	白玛镇	3,280	10,761.2
Qamdo Prefecture	Baxoi County	Bangda	4,120	13,517.1
Qamdo Prefecture	Baxoi County	Ranwu	3,960	12,992.1
Qamdo Prefecture	Zuogong	旺达镇	3,877	12,719.8
Nagchu Prefecture	Nagchu County	城关镇	4,492	14,737.5
Xigazê Prefecture	Shigatse	城南城北街道	3,836	12,585
Xigazê Prefecture	Nielamu County	Zhangmu	2,300	7,545.9
