= Lamaling Monastery =

Monastery in Tibet, China

Lamaling Monastery Zangdrok Pelri Monastery Burqug Lamaling Monastery
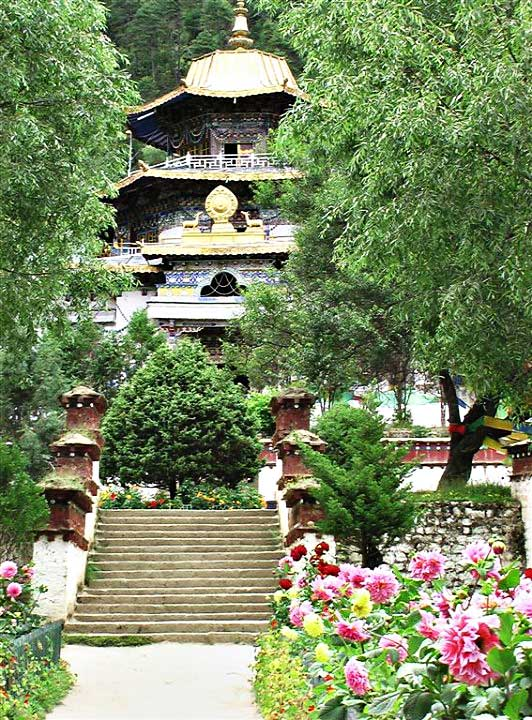
- The Lamaling Monastery

- Location within Tibet

Religion
- Affiliation: Tibetan Buddhism
- Sect: Nyingmapa (Red hat)
- Deity: Sakyamuni Buddha
- Festivals: Festival on 10th, 15th and 25th day of every Lunar month
- Leadership: Chuni Rinpoche, son of Dudjom Rinpoche

Location
- Location: Burqug village, Nyingchi County, Tibet
- Country: Tibet
- Interactive map of Lamaling Monastery; Zangdrok Pelri Monastery; Burqug Lamaling Monastery
- Coordinates: 29°27′34″N 94°23′29″E

Architecture
- Founder: Dudjom Rinpoche (1907-1987)
- Established: Original in 7th century in ruins, new in 20th century
- Semo Dechen and her husband Lama Chonyi Rinpoche built the new temple in 1989

Lamaling Monastery (Tib. bla ma gling?), also known as Zangdrok Pelri Monastery (桑多白日, Sangzhog Bairi) and Burqug Lamaling (布久喇嘛林寺), is a Buddhist monastery located near the village of Jianqie (简切村, Administrative Division Code 54 26 21 201 209), Burqug Township, Bayi District (former Nyingchi County), in Tibet, on a small hill 1.5 km south of Buchu Monastery. The monastery belongs to the Nyingmapa sect, translated as the 'Ancient Ones'; their lineages go back to the first infusion of Buddhism from India to Tibet in the 7th century CE. The Nyingma sect incorporated many of the traditions of the native Tibetan Bon religion, which respects nature and local nature spirits.

== Geography ==
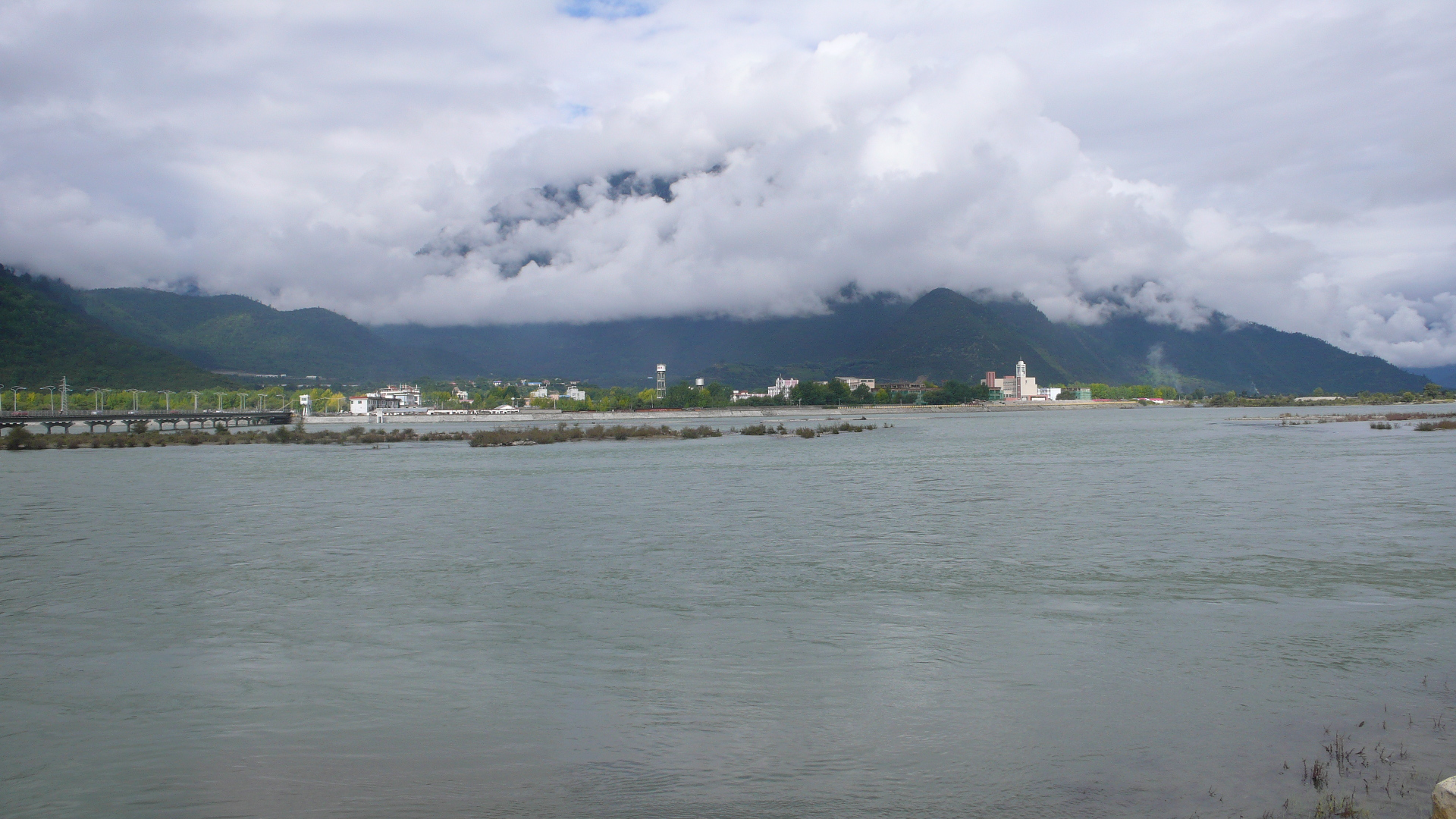
Nyang River, Bayi Town, Tibet

Lamaling Monastery is in the Nyingchi River valley, about 30 kilometres (19 mi) west of Bayi town (4 kilometres (2.5 mi) west off the main road). The river valley has snow-covered mountains, pristine lakes, villages and ancient monasteries, including the Lamaling Monastery. The intention of the Nyingchi valley people is to develop the area into an international forest park and make it the world's "third pole" by providing travel, trekking, mountain climbing facilities, and river rafting, as well as carrying out scientific studies.

The monastery is located halfway up the Norburi hill slope in a densely forested area. It is located on the third terrace on the left bank of the lower reaches of the Nyang River and encircled by hill ranges on three sides. It overlooks the forest-covered mountains and the delta at the mouth of the Nyang River. Thus, the monastery has a peaceful ambiance, with luxuriant green trees amidst a gentle flowing stream.

== History ==
The ancient monastery built in the 7th century (said to have been built in the Zangdok Pelri style) was destroyed in an earthquake in 1930. It was rebuilt as a small monastery on flat land below the ruined monastery in the 1930s. At that time, it was the seat of late Dudjom Rinpoche (1904–1987), who was chosen as the head of Nyingma school during his later exile to India, after Tibet came under control of the Chinese as an Autonomous Region of the People's Republic of China. The location of the monastery is also credited to an event that marked the religious contest between Buddhism and Bon religion.

Subsequent to the old monastery's destruction, a smaller temple (20 square kilometres (7.7 mi^{2})) was built below the old location on flat land. A legend narrated about this event purported a propitious omen of the 'Life supporting' stone (lado) of Buchu moving. Further, when the then Rinpoche performed the consecration ceremonies for the small temple, he is stated to have seen a three horned goat circling round the area and vanishing into a stone. This stone is still preserved in front of the ruined temple. In the 1960s, the small temple was destroyed and Dudjom Rinpoche's son, Dorje Pasang, was killed. The Lamaling Monastery, as rebuilt in 1989, is said to be one of the largest and most important Tibetan Buddhist monasteries in Nyingchi County.

In 1989, the late Dudjom Rinpoche's daughter Semo Dechen and her husband Lama Chonyi Rinpoche started the restoration works and built the present exquisite Zengdok Pelri Monastery (temple) with an extensive garden complex surrounding it. Constructed on the hill side, it is approachable by a motorable road from the valley below.

== Architecture ==
The new monastery is in an octagonal shape, has a height of about 20 metres (66 ft) and depicts a prominent gilded pagoda at the apex. It is a four-storied monument. The monastery is built with wood, with eaves (the eaves at the lower level depict twenty angles and those on the second and the third floors have an octagonal shape) in a curvature with radiantly painted beams. It is a fusion of Han and Tibetan artistic and architectural styles. The entire frontage is adorned with long strings of wooden prayer beads. In the main prayer hall, there is a kora and four protector chapels in each corner. The extant original image of Mehotara Heruka from the old monastery and foot print of the Padmasambhava are preserved in the restored monastery. The chapels have sculptures of Amitaba (Opagme), Avalokiteshwara (Chenresig) and Vajrapani (Chana Dorje). The top floor chapel also has a four-armed Avalokiteshwara (Chenresig) and two statues of Manjushri (Jampelyang). The new images in the various halls of the monastery are made from the best metal casting tradition of artisans from Chamdo. In the adjoining building, to the right of the main monastery, religious services are held on 10th, 15th and 25th day of each lunar month. The hall contains a large main statue of Sakyamuni (Sakya Thukpa). Pilgrims circumambulate around this building and the main temple as part of the Kora ritual. The four external walls are painted in white, blue, red and green against a backdrop of the golden dragon-shaped upturned eaves.

In 1987, a Dorje Trole stupa was built to the west of the old ruined temple. In the grassy courtyard in front of the monastery, a few mountain goats brought here from Tsodzong Monastery can also be seen.

The ruins of the original monastery can be seen on the hill side, and a trek of about 45 minutes leads to them. A small chapel here has a statue of Dorje Julut and an old photo of Rinpoche. A foot print of Sakyamuni is also seen above the door.

One particular unusual feature in the monastery is at the entrance gate of the monastery, where two large wooden male and female genitalia are seen, beside two stone lions. This is said to be a Bon religious practice of worship of nature in monasteries of Tibetan Buddhism, particularly of the Nyingmapa sect. It is a sight professing to drive off evil spirits. Another unique aspect of this monastery is that both nuns and monks recite the Tibetan scriptures together in the main prayer hall.

== Visitor information ==
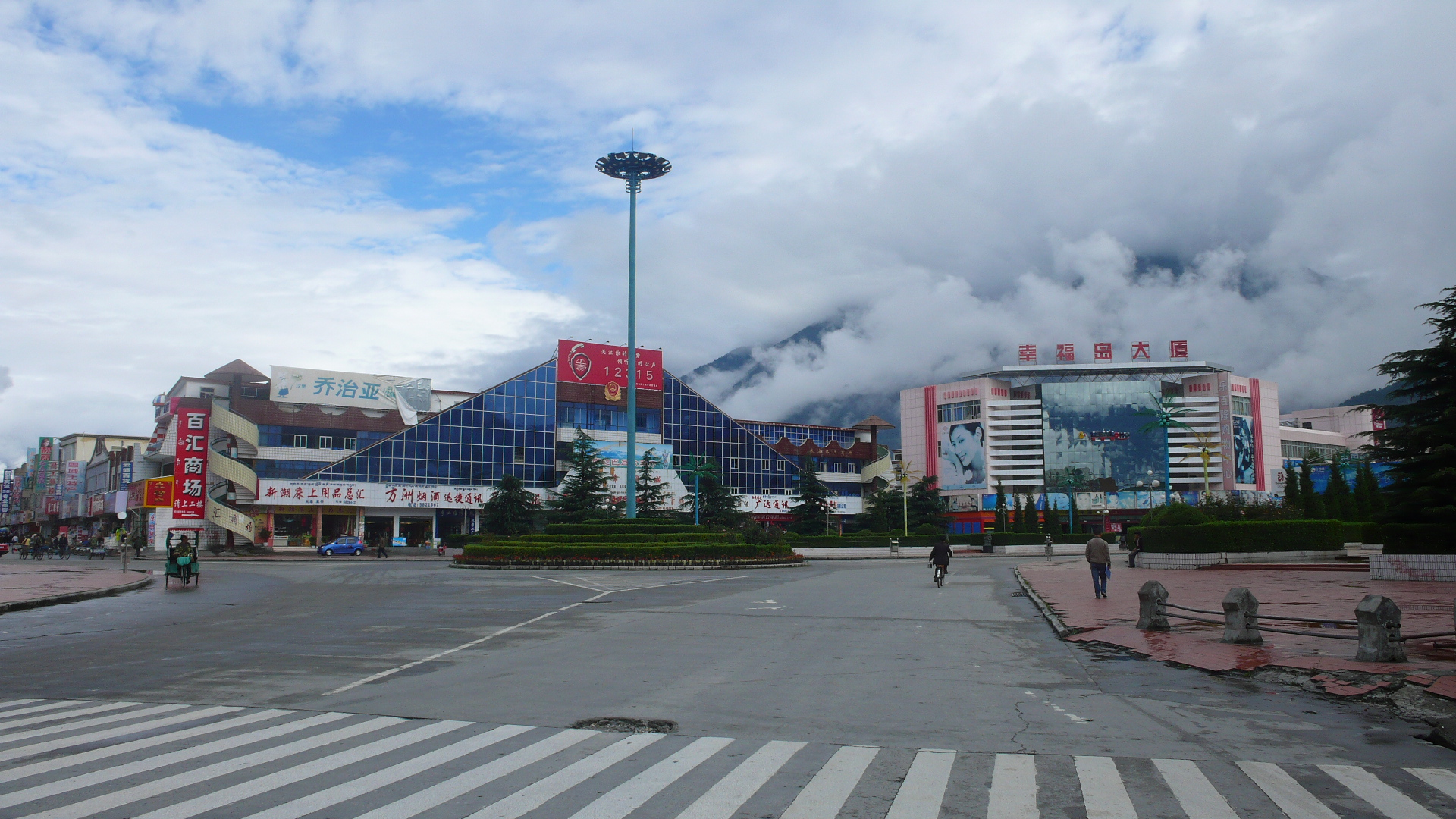
Bayi town, the nearest town to the monastery, 30 kilometres (19 mi) away

A road links Burqug village to the monastery. Burqug is linked to Bayi town, which is the nearest town to the monastery where all modern facilities are available. It is about 30 kilometres (19 mi) from the monastery. Two routes for travel in the Nyingchi valley are available to reach the Lamaling monastery at Burqug village. One route is east from Lhasa, which encompasses four scenic locations: Basum Lake, Bayi town, the Seche La Mountain and the Burqug Lamaling. This route is said to be good for visits and conducting scientific investigations. The second route is south from Lhasa, through Nyingchi, Mainling, and Shannan to the monastery. This circular route provides scenic natural landscapes, cultural and historical sites.

== See also ==
- List of Tibetan monasteries
