= Bayi =

Bayi may refer to these articles:

== Chinese ==
- Bāyī (八一, lit. eight-one, which means "August 1"), refers to the anniversary of the Nanchang Uprising, which is considered as the founding of the People's Liberation Army, and thus a common name used by entities in the People's Republic of China:
  - August First Film Studio
  - Bayi Kylin, a Women's Chinese Basketball Association team
  - Bayi Football Team, a men's association football team
  - Bayi Rockets, a men's Chinese Basketball Association team
  - Bayi Shenzhen, women's volleyball team
  - Bayi Square, in Nanchang, Jiangxi
  - Bayi Xiangtan, a women's association football team
  - Bayi, Nyingchi County, a town in Tibet
  - Bayi District, a District of Nyingchi in the Tibet
    - Bayi Subdistrict, a subdistrict in Tibet and seat of Bayi District
  - Nanchang Bayi, a men's association football team
  - August 1st (aerobatic team), also called the Bayi Aerobatics Team

== People ==
- Saw Bayi, Aung San Thuriya Medal winner
- Sethu Lakshmi Bayi (1895–1985), ruler of Travancore
- Filbert Bayi (born 1953), Tanzanian middle-distance runner

== Others ==
- Bəyi, a village and municipality in the Kurdamir Rayon of Azerbaijan
- Bayi people, a tribe in China
