= Xiuba Ancient Fortress =

Military complex in Tibet, China

Coordinates: 29.838535°N 93.711896°E

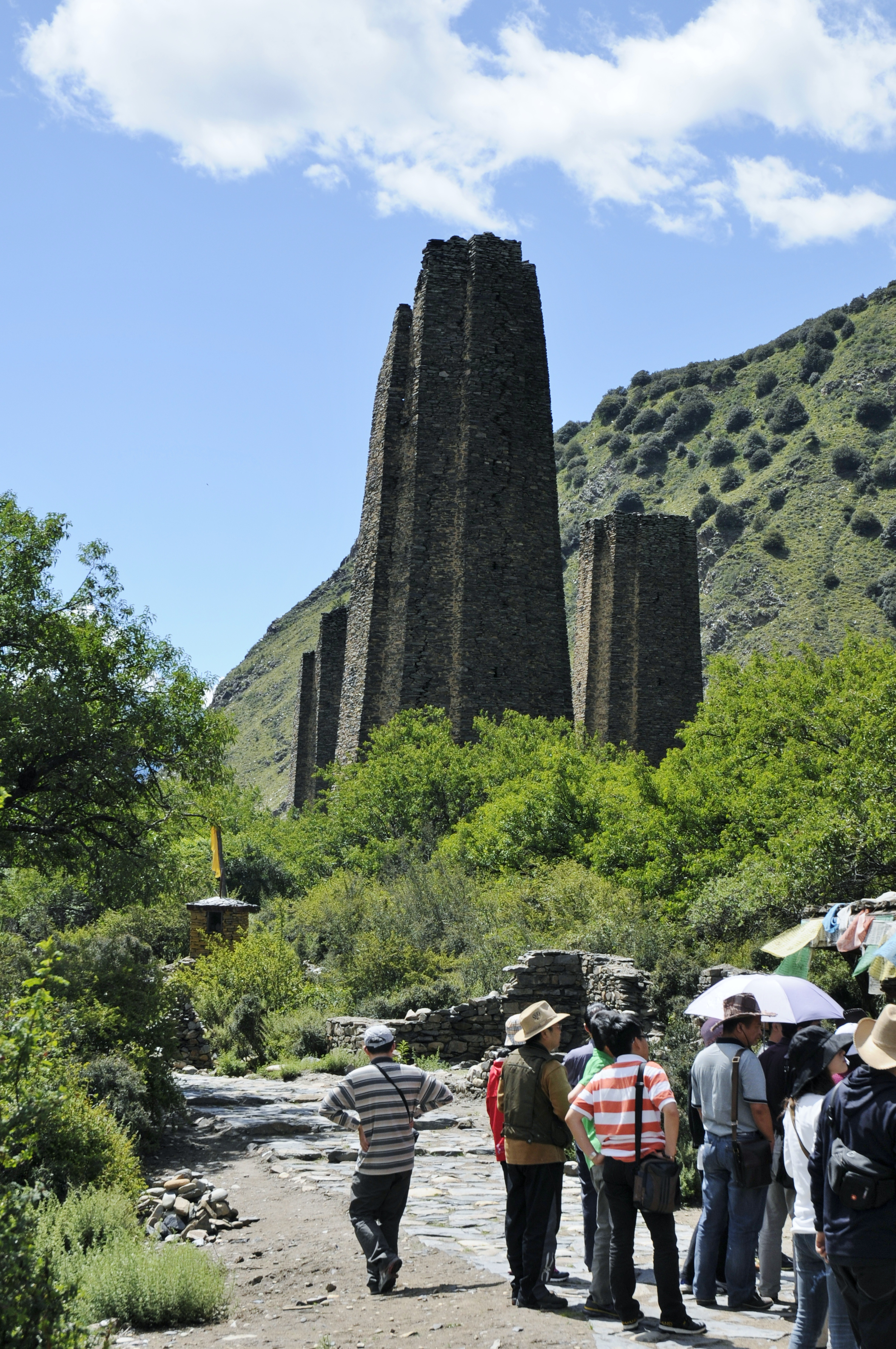
Xiuba Ancient Fortress

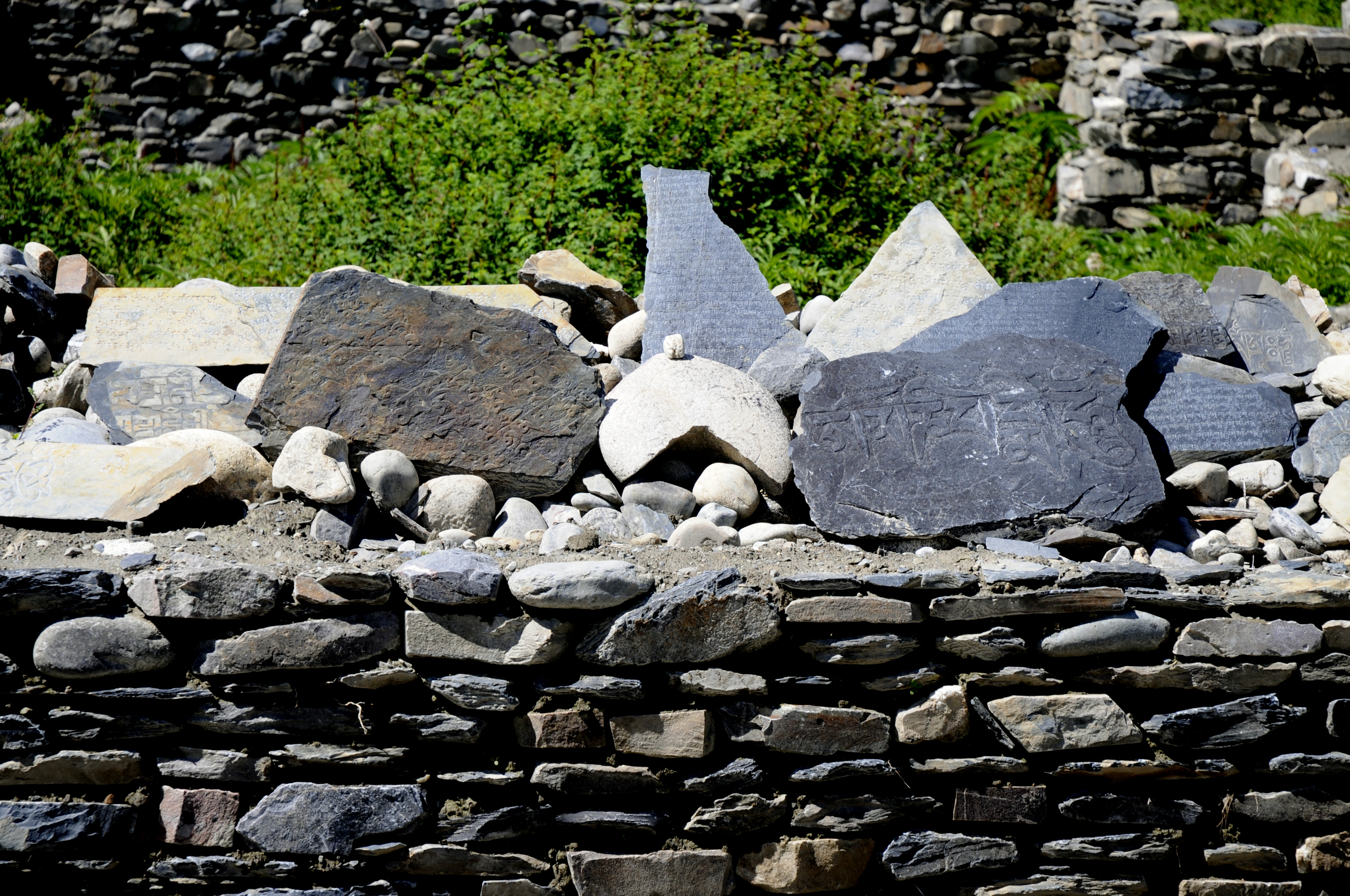
Stone inscription

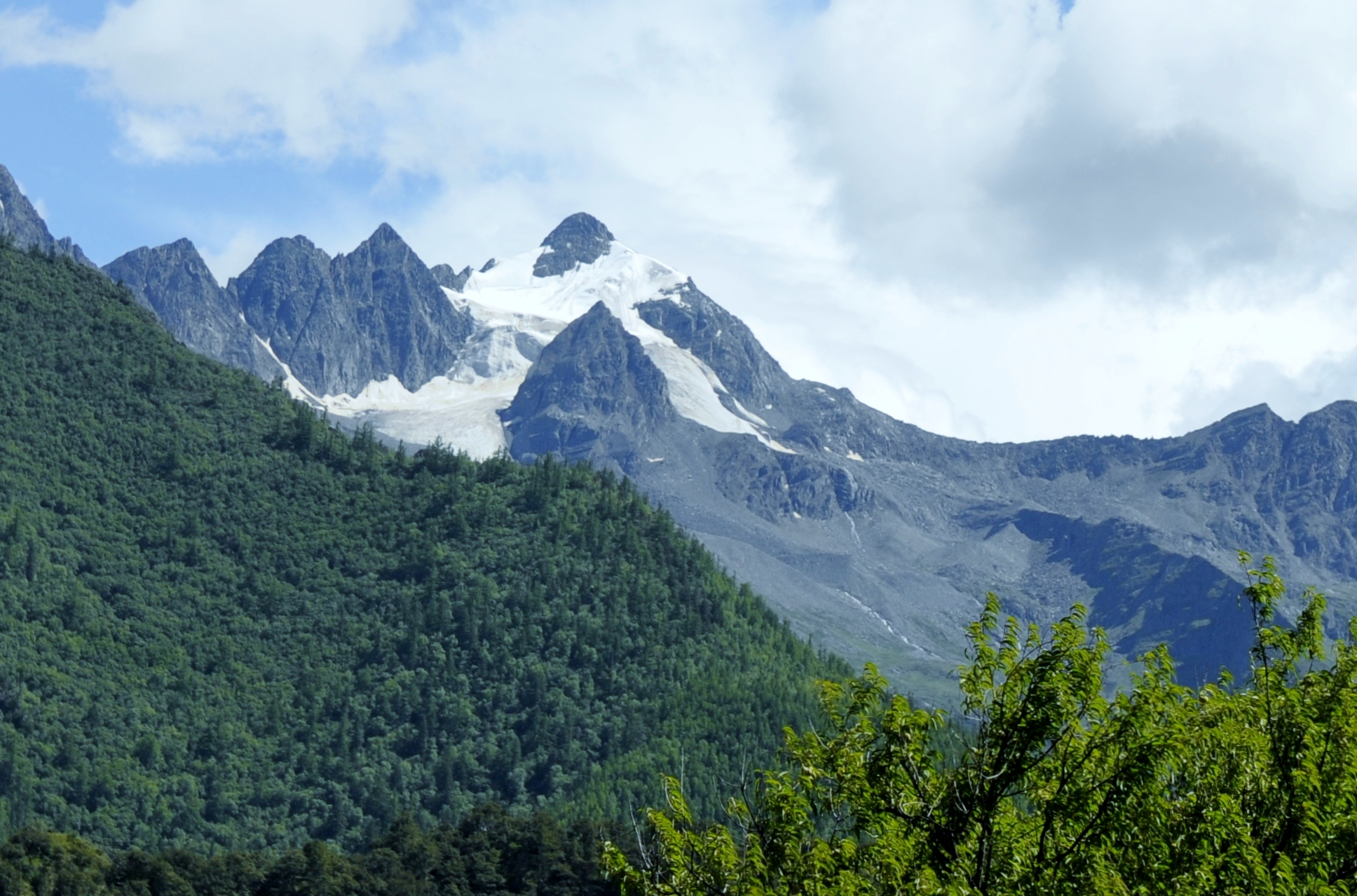
View of the glacier from Xiuba Ancient Fortress

The Xiuba Ancient Fortress (Chinese: 秀巴古堡; Tibetan: ཤུ་པ་དམར་པོའི་རྫོང) is a military complex in Xiuba Village, Bahe Town, Gongbo'gyamda County, Nyingchi, Tibet. It was built at the end of the Tang dynasty.
