= Nyang Pavilion =

Museum in Nyingchi, Tibet, China

The Nyang Pavilion (Chinese: 尼洋阁, Tibetan: ཉང་ལྷ་ཁང), Niyangge Museum, or Southeastern Tibet Cultural Heritage Museum (Chinese: 藏东南文化遗产博物馆), is a cultural landmark and museum complex situated in Bayi District, Nyingchi, Tibet, China. Construction began in 2004 and was finished in September 2006. It became concentrated on intangible cultural heritage in April 2010, making it China's first museum with that focus. The museum's building is five stories tall. Spanning 2,829 m^{2} (30,450 sq ft), it is 36.9 m (121 ft) tall.
