= Laohuzui Hydropower Station =

Hydropower station in Tibet, China

Laohuzui Hydropower Station 老虎嘴水电站
- Interactive map of Laohuzui Hydropower Station 老虎嘴水电站
- Country: China
- Location: on the main stream of Ba River
- Purpose: Power
- Construction began: September 2007
- Construction cost: ¥1.288 billion

The Laohuzui Hydropower Station (Chinese: 老虎嘴水电站), also called as Laohuzui hydropower project, is a hydropower station in Tibet located in Gongbo Gyamda County of Nyingchi Prefecture, about 343 km from Lhasa. The "Laohuzui" in the phrase "Laohuzui Hydropower Station" refers to the "tiger's mouth".

== History ==
Approved by the National Development and Reform Commission, the construction of the project started in September 2007 with a total investment of ¥1.288 billion and was completed on 17 June 2011 with a total installed capacity of 102 megawatts. On March 30, 2008, the hydroelectric station dammed the river.

The project was constructed with the participation of the Third Corps of Armed Police Hydropower Troops (武警水电第三总队), and is one of the key construction projects in the "Eleventh Five-Year" power development plan of the Tibet Autonomous Region.
