= Zhongsa Village =

Zhongsa Village 仲萨村
- Country: China
- Region: Tibet
- City: Nyingchi
- County: Gongbo'gyamda County
- Postal code: 860000
- Area code: 0894

Zhongsa Village (Tibetan: གྲོང་གསར་གྲོང་ཚོ།, Wylie: grong gsar grong tsho; simplified Chinese: 仲萨村; traditional Chinese: 仲薩村) is an administrative village under the jurisdiction of Zhongsha Township, Gongbo'gyamda County, Nyingchi City, Tibet. The grassroots mass autonomous organization in which the village is located is the Zhongsa Villagers' Committee, whose zoning code is 540421202203.
