= Beyi =

Beyi may refer to:

- Bəyi, a village in Azerbaijan
- Bey, an Ottoman title
- Bey, a word, playable in word's with friend's
