= Lieshan Ancient Tombs =

Lieshan Ancient Tombs (Chinese: 列山古墓群; Tibetan: ལེགས་ཤན་གསར་རྙིང་གི་ས་མཚོན) are a complex of burial sites in Nyingchi in Tibet, China. It has burial sites from as early as the Tibetan Empire. It occupies several kilometres and is near the Linqiong Highway in the Jindong Township of Lang County.
