= Goikarla Rigyu =

- Standard Tibetan: རྒོད་འཁར་ལ་རི་རྒྱུད; Chinese: 郭格拉日居; pinyin: Guō gélā rì jū
- Location within Tibet

Highest point
- Coordinates: 29°36′53″N 93°12′54″E

Geography
- Country: China
- Autonomous Region: Tibet

Goikarla Rigyu, also spelled Goikarla Ri'gyü or Guotalari, is a range of mountains to the north of the Yarlung Tsangpo River and southeast of the city of Lhasa in the Tibet Autonomous Region of China.

== Location ==
The Goikarla Rigyu extends along the north bank of the Yarlung Tsangpo from Gonggar to Mainling. To the north of the range, the lower reaches of the Lhasa River run westward and then turn south to join the Yarlung Tsangpo. Further east, the Nyang River (Chinese: 尼洋河) rises in the range to the west of Mila Mountain and runs east and then south past Nyingchi to join the Yarlung Tsangpo just downstream from Mainling. The range includes the "WordeKongge" (Chinese: 沃徳貢; pinyin: wò dé gòng) holy mountain. This mountain rises to an altitude of 5,998 metres (19,678 ft). Other peaks rise as high as 6,132 metres (20,118 ft) above sea level.
