= Beba =

Beba may refer to:

- Bêba (Chinese: 白巴; pinyin: Báibā), a town in Tibet
- Beba language, spoken in Cameroon
- Beba Village Community in Cameroon
- Beba Veche, a commune in Timiș County, Romania
- Beba (grape) a wine and table grape from Extremadura, Spain
- Beba (film), a 2021 U.S.-Mexico documentary film

== See also ==
- Beabadoobee, a Filipino-British singer-songwriter
