= Mila Mountain =

Mountain in Tibet, China

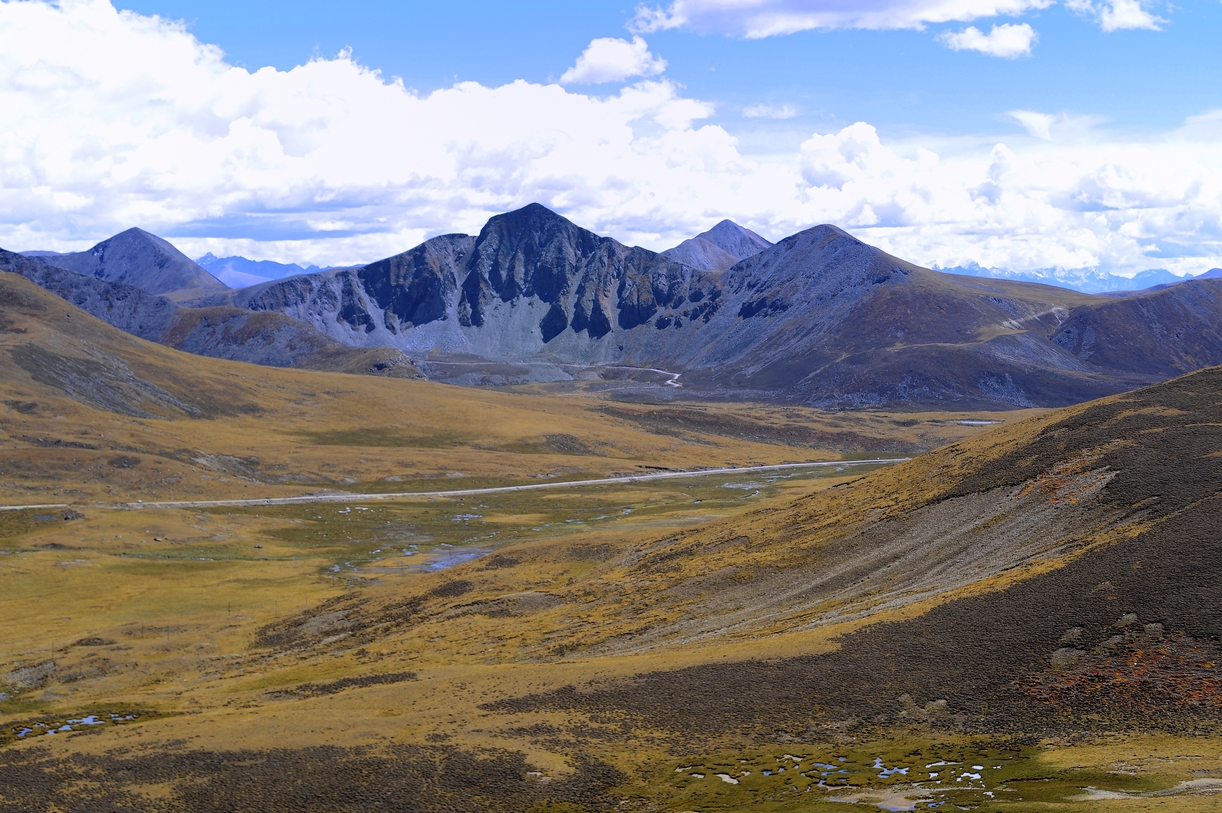
- Mi La mountain pass

Highest point
- Elevation: 5,200 m (17,100 ft)
- Coordinates: 29.848220°N 92.362586°E

Geography
- Location within Tibet
- Parent range: Goikarla Rigyu

Geology
- Volcanic arc: Gangdese batholith

Mila Mountain, or Mira Mountain, or Milha Mountain (Chinese: 米拉山; pinyin: Mǐ lā shān), is a mountain in the Tibet Autonomous Region of China, roughly 150 kilometres (93 mi) by road northeast of Lhasa. The road pass that runs by its peak is one of the highest on China National Highway 318.

== Location ==
Mila Mountain lies on the border between the Lhasa Prefecture and the Nyingchi Prefecture, and has an elevation of 5,200 metres (17,060 ft) above sea level. The pass to the west of the mountain between Lhasa's Maizhokunggar County and Nyinchi's Gongbo'gyamda County is the highest point on the Nyingchi–Lhasa section of China National Highway 318. It has an average elevation of 5,000 metres (16,404 ft). In 2006 it was reported that local farmers could earn around 50 yuan, or US$6.25, daily from selling souvenirs at the Mila mountain pass. In January 2015 it was announced that there were plans to build a tunnel for this part of the road later in the year. The tunnel opened to traffic on April 29, 2019 and is the highest road tunnel in the world.

== Environment ==
The west of the mountain is dry and cool, while the east side is warmer and has more moisture, and therefore has richer vegetation. The foothills have natural pastures and farmland. Trees include Yunnan pine, birch and fir. Wildlife includes roe deer, antelope and bear.

== Sources ==
- "A journey in Tibet: Mila Mountain". People's Daily Online. 2012-03-05. Archived from the original on 2015-02-20.
- "Mila Mountain Lhasa". oktrips. Archived from the original on 2015-02-20.
- Zhang, Huilli (2015-01-20). "Lalin main sections of the highway started, construction works are 75% completed, Mira mountain tunnel construction this year". China Tibet News.
- Zhang, Sophia (2006-04-26). "Doing business at Mila mountain pass". Embassy of the People's Republic of China in India.
