= Kongpo =

Coordinates: 29.8897°N 93.2442°E

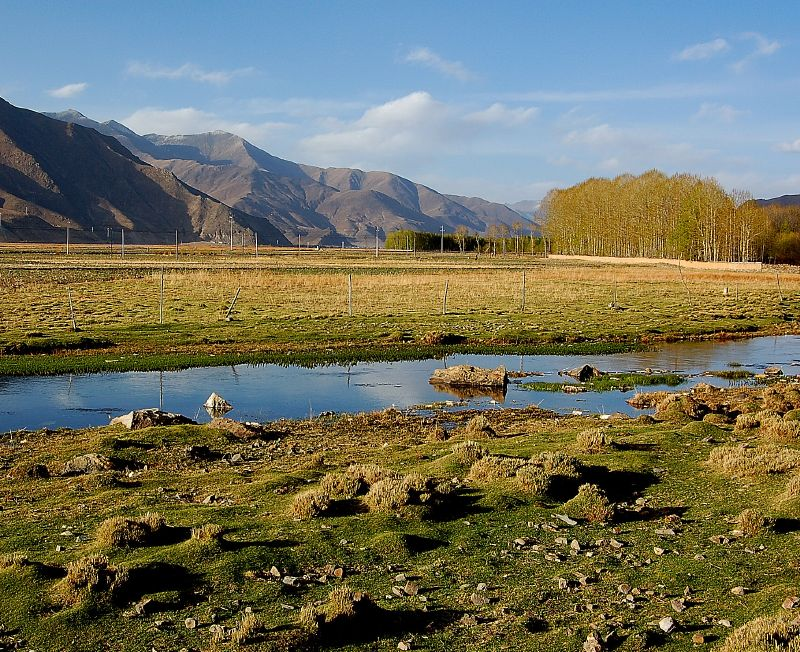
Kongpo

Kongpo (Tibetan: ཀོང་པོ་, Wylie: kong po) is a region of central-eastern Tibet, centered in modern Gongbo'gyamda County, Nyingchi Prefecture. It is situated on the Nyang River, a northern tributary of the Yarlung Tsangpo River.

Lhading, also known as Nelung, is a settlement in southeastern Tibet associated with the historic Kongpo region. Located at approximately 3,000 metres, it has forested valleys, farmland, and Tibetan Buddhist traditions. Its climate is influenced by the Indian monsoon, and local waterways eventually join the broader Yarlung Tsangpo River system.

Kongpo Drula Gonpa is the oldest and largest monastery in the region, founded by Khenchen Dawa Sangpo in 14th century. Kongpo Drula Khenchen is the highest Lama of Kongpo. Kongpo was an area of southeastern Tibet in the premodern period. Tsagong was one of the holy places of Kongpo and still is. Thang Tong Gyalpo, a famous architect and yogi, founded Manmogang Monastery, where the original Samding Dorje Phagmo died. Nearby are the mines from which Thang Tong Gyalpo obtained the iron for some of his bridges.

Old Tsari is now part of the modern country in the southeast of the Tibet Autonomous Region and including parts of neighboring areas of India, and New Tsari is located farther east.

== Notable people ==
- Sonam Dolma Brauen (born 1953), Tibetan-Swiss Contemporary painter and sculptor
