= Güncang Monba Ethnic Township =

Coordinates: 29°45′N 94°08′E

Guncang is a village in the Bayi District, Tibet Autonomous Region of China.

== See also ==
- List of towns and villages in Tibet
