= Puqu Township =

Puqu Township 布久乡
- Township
- Location in the Tibet AR
- Coordinates: 29°28′06″N 94°24′54″E
- Country: People's Republic of China
- Province: Tibet
- Prefecture-level city: Nyingchi
- Time zone: UTC+8 (China Standard)

Puqu or Burqug (Chinese: 布久; pinyin: Bùjiǔ) is a township located in the south of Bayi District, Nyingchi, Tibet Autonomous Region, China.

== See also ==
- List of towns and villages in Tibet
