= Bêba =

Bêba 百巴镇
- Town
- Location in the Tibet Autonomous Region
- Coordinates (Bêba government): 29°47′42″N 93°51′00″E
- Country: People's Republic of China
- Autonomous region: Tibet
- Prefecture-level city: Nyingchi
- Time zone: UTC+8 (China Standard)

Bêba (Chinese: 百巴; pinyin: Báibā) is a town in the west of Bayi District, Nyingchi, in the southeast of the Tibet Autonomous Region. It lies at an altitude of 3,231 metres (10,603 feet) along China National Highway 318 from Markam to Lhasa, between Bayi and Kongpo Gyamda. The Niyang River, a tributary of the Tsangpo, flows past the town.

== See also ==
- List of towns and villages in Tibet Autonomous Region
