= Buchu Monastery =

Monastery in Tibet, China

- Nyangtri County, Eastern Tibet.

Religion
- Affiliation: Tibetan Buddhism
- Deity: Guru Rinpoche / Padmasambhava

Location
- Location: China
- Interactive map of Buchu Monastery
- Coordinates: 29.48175°N 94.41633°E

Architecture
- Founder: King Songtsen Gampo.
- Established: 7th century CE

Buchu Monastery, Buchu Sergyi Lhakhang, or Buchasergyi Lakang Monastery (Tibetan: བུ་ཆུ་གཟི་བྱིན་ལྷ་ཁང, Wylie: bu-chu gzi-byin lha-khang) is a temple in an ancient monastery about 28 km south of the modern town of Bayi, which replaces the old village of Drakchi, in Nyingchi County of eastern Tibet, China.

== Description ==
The two-storied monastery has a striking golden roof which can be seen from afar. There have been only eight monks living here recently.

Previously the temple contained images of the Eight Manifestations of Padmasambhava, and the upper floor had eight images of Amitayus which have not yet been restored. The lower part of the large Padmasambhava downstairs survived, and still contains the zungjuk or mantra-core.

== History ==
The original buildings here were built during the 7th century reign of King Songtsen Gampo. It was created as one of the eight "demoness-subduing" temples, and was constructed according to geomantic theory on the right elbow of the ogress who represented Tibet. It is the oldest Buddhist structure in the eastern Tibetan region of Kongpo. It originally belonged to the Nyingmapa, but by the 17th century there were Gelugpa present here, and it formally adopted by them during the time of the Regent, Demo Rinpoche (r.1886-1895).

== Geomancy ==
The temple is part of a network of 12 temples arranged around Jo-khang temple at Lhasa. All of them were built in the time of King Songtsen Gampo.
