= Xizang Agricultural and Husbandry University =

University in Tibet, China

Coordinates: 29.669°N 94.340°E

- 西藏农牧大学
- Motto: 博学为农，精业兴藏
- Type: Public
- Established: 1958; 68 years ago
- Administrative staff: 604
- Students: 8,333
- Undergraduates: 7,354
- Postgraduates: 979
- Location: Nyingchi, Tibet, China
- Campus: Urban
- Website: www.xza.edu.cn

Xizang Agricultural and Husbandry University (西藏农牧大学), sometimes referred to as the Tibet College of Agriculture, is a full-time undergraduate public provincial university in Bayi Town, Bayi District, Nyingchi, Tibet, China.

== History ==
In 1972, the Nyingchi branch of the Xizang Minzu College was established. In 1978, it was reorganized as the Xizang College of Agriculture and Animal Husbandry. In September 2001, it merged with the former Tibet University to form the new Tibet University and was reorganized as the College of Agriculture and Animal Husbandry of the Tibet University. In June 2016, it broke away from the Tibet University and resumed its name as the Xizang Agricultural and Husbandry University.
