= Kaiyuan Changhong Bridge =

Bridge in Yunnan, China

Coordinates: 23°48′56″N 103°16′34″E

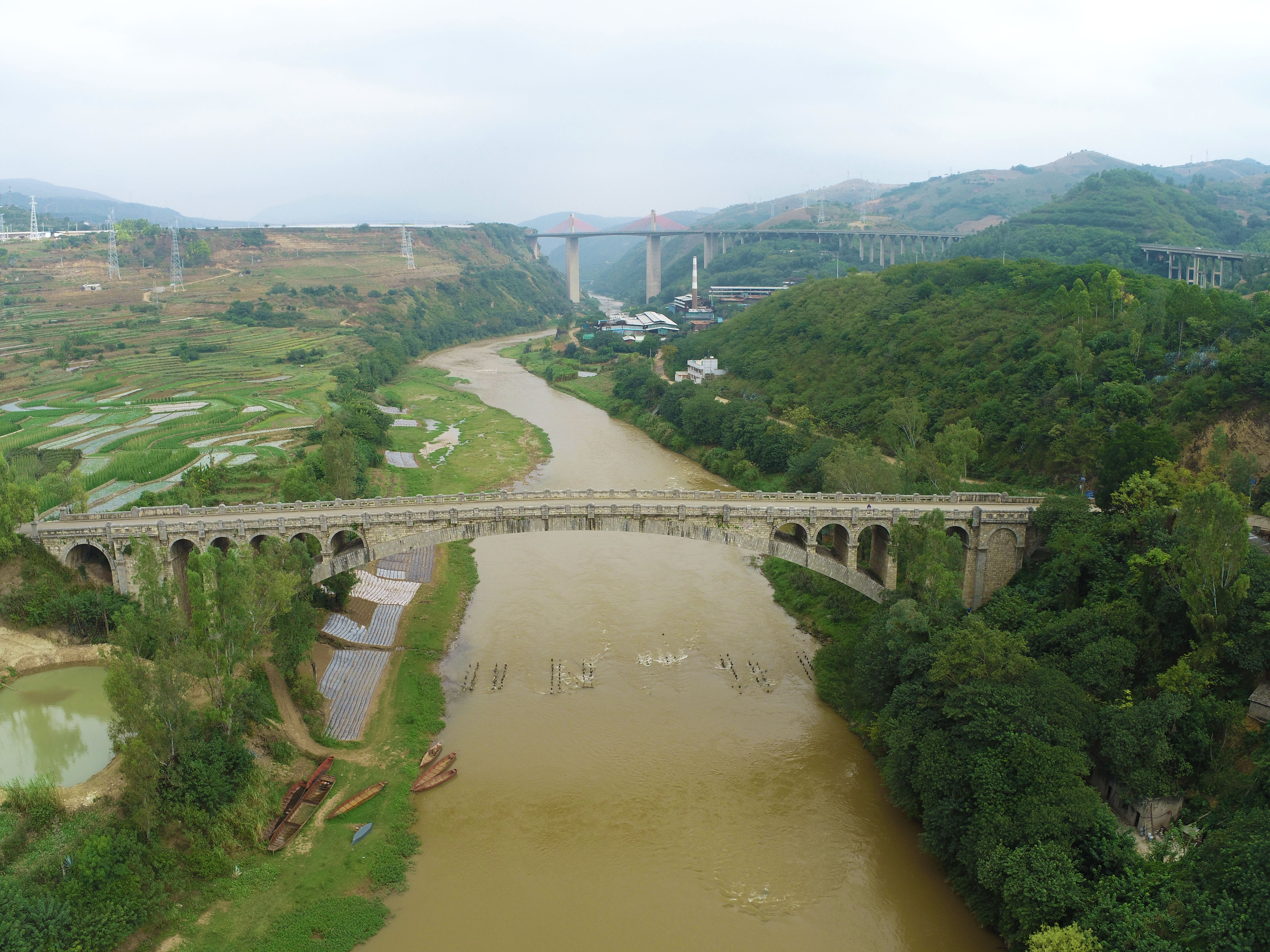
Kaiyuan Changhong Bridge

The Kaiyuan Changhong Bridge, a stone arch structure spanning the Nanpanjiang River east of Tianfang Village Group in Kaiyuan City, Honghe Prefecture, Yunnan Province, China, is situated along the former National Highway 326. Constructed in 1961, it is designated as a national-level protected bridge and included in Major cultural heritage sites under national-level protection.

== History ==
The earliest bridge on the Nanpan River in Kaiyuan City, the Nanpan River Suspension Bridge, also referred to as the Iron Cord Bridge, was constructed during the twenty-fourth year of the Guangxu era of the Qing dynasty (1898). It was financed by the Yunnan merchant Wang Chi, who donated silver for its construction. In 1927, the bridge was destroyed by bandits. In 1944, during the Second Sino-Japanese War, the Iron Cord Bridge was utilized for distributing ammunition. This bridge was constructed on the site of a previous flexible steel cable suspension bridge, featuring a span of 63.4 meters and a load capacity of 10 tons. In 1949, the Kuomintang army detonated and destroyed the suspension bridge to obstruct the advance of PLA, which was subsequently reconstructed the following year. During the 1950s and 1960s, Kaiyuan evolved as an industrial town in Yunnan, but the iron rope bridge failed to accommodate the increasing traffic demands.

A new single-span stone arch bridge, over 100 meters in length, is to be constructed around 2 kilometers north of the old cable bridge. Construction commenced in March 1960, with an anticipated completion date in September of the same year, coinciding with the National Day celebration. At 4:45 p.m. on September 25, 1960, the arch under construction fell from south to north as a result of a storm. The accident postponed the building timeline by one year, and in September 1961, the bridge was formally inaugurated for traffic. The workers, during the construction of the bridge, used the phrase "overcome the difficulties and offer a long rainbow." Due to the bridge's grandeur and its resemblance to a rainbow soaring over the river, it was christened "Changhong Bridge", which means "long rainbow" in Chinese. Upon its completion, the Changhong Bridge was the biggest single-hole stone arch bridge in China, and the Chinese bridge specialist Mao Yisheng asserted that it was the longest single-arch stone bridge globally at that time.

== Construction ==
The Kaiyuan Changhong Bridge is a large-span, single-hole, hollow-arch stone bridge with open shoulders, across the Nanpan River in an east–west orientation. The bridge is 171 meters in length, 30 meters in height, has a clear width of 8.5 meters, and features a major span of 113 meters. The primary aperture on each flank of the 5-hole secondary arch. Stone parapets flank both sides of the bridge, with the west end featuring pillars inscribed with "mountains bow down, the river gives way," and the east end displaying the inscription "prosperity of the economy, the people," reflecting the specific traits of the era.

== Present Condition ==
In 1996, the Kunhe secondary highway (now the new National Highway 320) was completed and opened for traffic, featuring a newly constructed bridge over the Nanpanjiang River, downstream of the Changhong Bridge (currently the Nanpanjiang Bridge over the Xiuhe River). Since then, the new bridge has assumed the primary transportation responsibilities. In September 2007, the Changhong Bridge was designated as part of the fifth batch of cultural relic protection units in Honghe Prefecture. In February 2019, it was recognized by the People's Government of Yunnan Province as part of the eighth batch of provincial cultural relics protection units in Yunnan. The Government of Yunnan also designated Changhong Bridge as one of the eighth batch of Yunnan Provincial Cultural Relics Protection Units. Subsequently, in October of the same year, the State Council of the People's Republic of China recognized it as one of the eighth batch of national key cultural relic protection units.
