= Pagsum Lake =

Lake in People's Republic of China

Pagsum Co
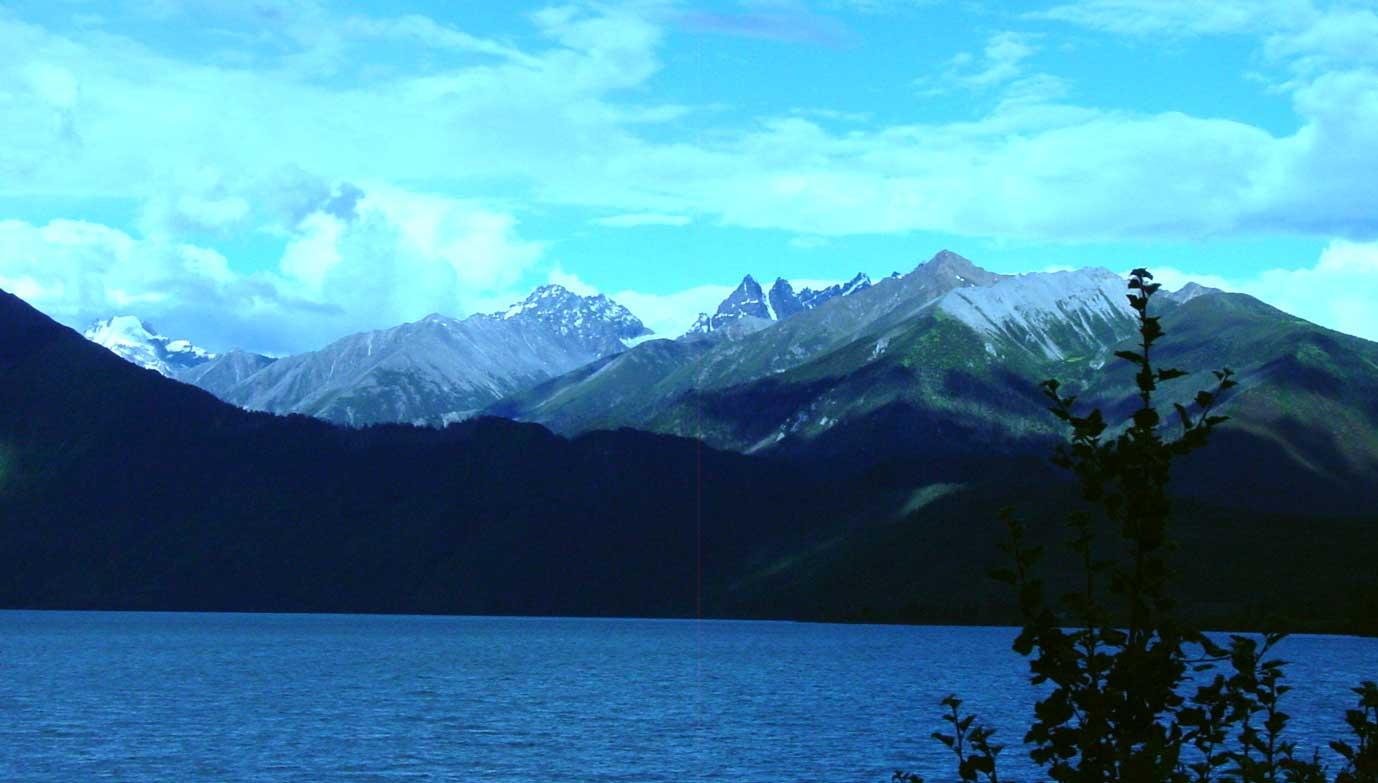
- View north-east from Tashi Island

- Location within Tibet
- Location: Gongbo'gyamda County, Tibet
- Coordinates: 30°00′51″N 93°57′01″E
- Basin countries: China
- Max. length: 18 km (11 mi)
- Surface area: 27 km^{2} (10 sq mi)
- Max. depth: 120 m (390 ft)
- Surface elevation: 3,700 m (12,100 ft)

Dragsum Tsho (Tibetan: བྲག་གསུམ་མཚོ་, Wylie: brag gsum mtsho, THL: Draksum Tso), Pagsum Co (simplified Chinese: 八松错, 巴松措; traditional Chinese: 八松錯; pinyin: Bāsōng Cuò), literally meaning "three rocks" in Tibetan, is a lake covering 28 square kilometres in Gongbo'gyamda County, Nyingchi of the Tibet Autonomous Region, China, approximately 300 km (190 mi) east of Lhasa. At 3,700 metres over sea level it is about 18 km long and has an average width of approximately 1.5 km (0.93 mi). The deepest point of the green lake measures 120 metres. The lake is also known as Gongga Lake.

== Geography ==
Surrounded by dense primary forests of fir, spruce, and rhododendron, the lake hosts 195 native animal species and 242 phytoplankton varieties, including endemic fish like the naked carp (Gymnocypris spp.), which thrive in its oligotrophic waters. The northwestern shore features a 5 m^{2} sacred boulder with a central perforation, believed to cleanse sins and cure illnesses through ritual passage.

Culturally, Dragsum Tsho is central to the Kongpo people, a Tibetan subgroup known for unique traditions like polyandrous marriages and silver-ornamented attire35. The 7th-century Tsodzong Monastery on Drowa Island (Chinese: 扎西岛) exemplifies Nyingma school architecture, dedicated to Padmasambhava and adorned with ancient carvings of the deity Hayagriva. Annually on the 15th day of the fourth Tibetan month, pilgrims circumambulate the lake, tracing routes marked by King Gesar's legendary arrow strikes and hoofprints of his warhorse embedded in shoreline rocks. The lake's designation as Tibet's first AAAAA-rated scenic area in 1994 underscores its dual role as an ecological sanctuary and living cultural archive.

== Climate ==
Climate data for Pagsum Lake
Month	Jan	Feb	Mar	Apr	May	Jun	Jul	Aug	Sep	Oct	Nov	Dec	Year
Mean daily maximum °C (°F)	5.2 (41.4)	6.9 (44.4)	10.3 (50.5)	13.8 (56.8)	17.0 (62.6)	19.7 (67.5)	20.5 (68.9)	20.3 (68.5)	18.4 (65.1)	14.7 (58.5)	10.1 (50.2)	6.6 (43.9)	13.6 (56.5)
Daily mean °C (°F)	−2.4 (27.7)	−0.1 (31.8)	3.3 (37.9)	6.8 (44.2)	10.4 (50.7)	13.7 (56.7)	14.8 (58.6)	14.4 (57.9)	12.5 (54.5)	8.0 (46.4)	2.6 (36.7)	−1.1 (30.0)	6.9 (44.4)
Mean daily minimum °C (°F)	−10.0 (14.0)	−7.1 (19.2)	−3.7 (25.3)	−0.2 (31.6)	3.8 (38.8)	7.7 (45.9)	9.1 (48.4)	8.5 (47.3)	6.6 (43.9)	1.4 (34.5)	−4.9 (23.2)	−8.8 (16.2)	0.2 (32.4)
Average precipitation mm (inches)	2 (0.1)	3 (0.1)	10 (0.4)	27 (1.1)	51 (2.0)	108 (4.3)	117 (4.6)	100 (3.9)	89 (3.5)	28 (1.1)	5 (0.2)	2 (0.1)	542 (21.4)
Source: Climate-Data.org
