= Bayi District =

Bayi 巴宜区 • བྲག་ཡིབ་ཆུས། Chagyib, Nyingchi
- District
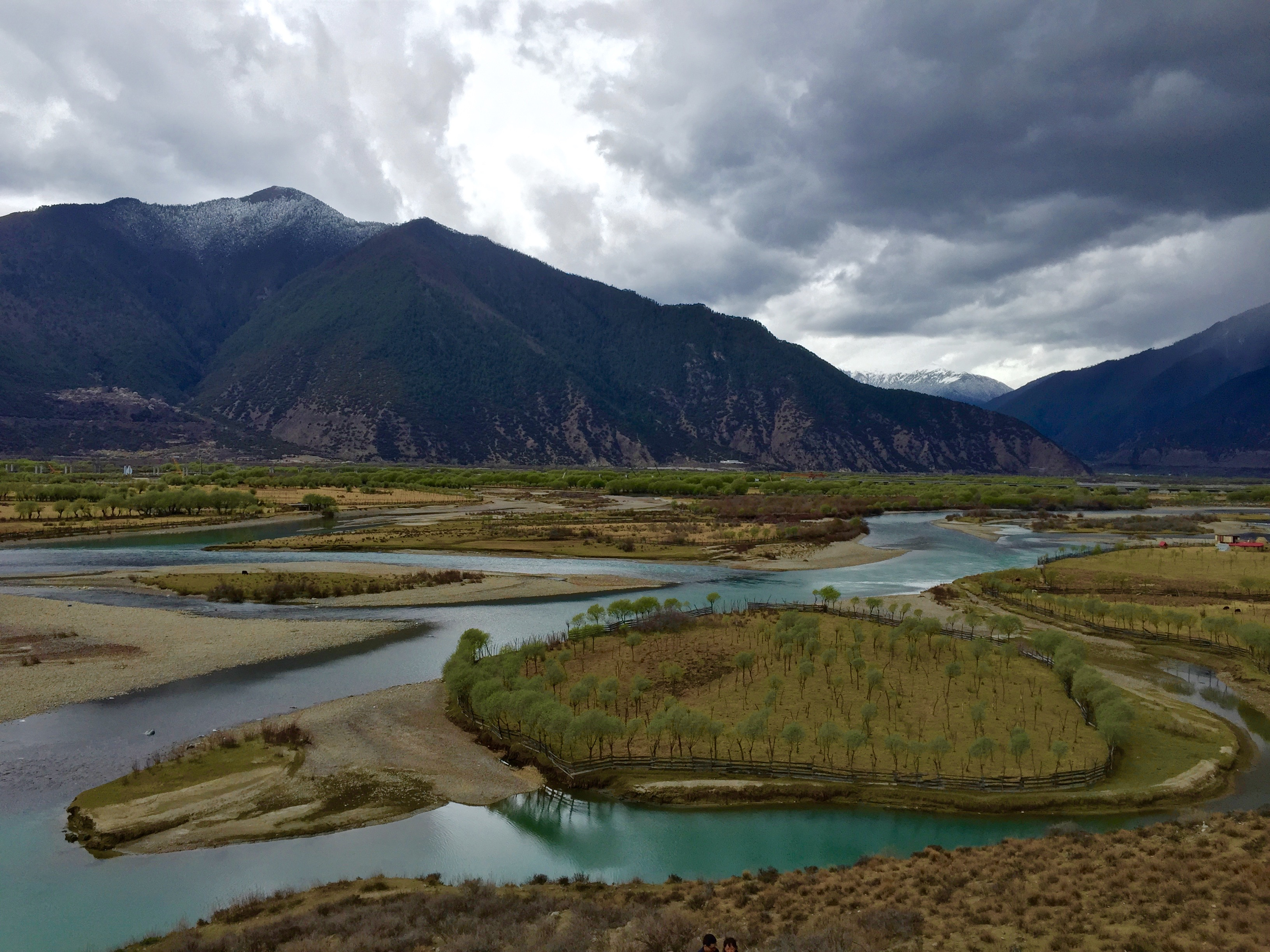
- Nyang River in Bayi District

- Location of the seat in the Tibet Autonomous Region Bayi (China)
- Coordinates (Nyingchi municipal government): 29°38′56″N 94°21′43″E
- Country: China
- Autonomous region: Tibet
- Prefecture-level city: Nyingchi
- District seat: Jomo Subdistrict

Area
  - Total: 8,558.23 km^{2} (3,304.35 sq mi)

Population (2020)
  - Total: 84,254
  - Density: 9.8448/km^{2} (25.498/sq mi)
- Time zone: UTC+8 (China Standard)
- Website: www.bayiqu.gov.cn

Bayi

Chinese name
- Simplified Chinese: 巴宜区
- Traditional Chinese: 巴宜區
Transcriptions
Standard Mandarin
- Hanyu Pinyin: Bāyí Qū

Tibetan name
- Tibetan: བྲག་ཡིབ་ཆུས།
Transcriptions
- Wylie: brag yib chus
- Tibetan Pinyin: Chagyib Qü

Bayi or Chagyib District (巴宜区 or བྲག་ཡིབ་ཆུས།), formerly Nyingchi County, is a District of Nyingchi in the Tibet Autonomous Region, China. Bayi Town, the administrative capital of Nyingchi, is located within the district.

== History ==
In 1951, modern administrative structures formally integrated the area, initially establishing it as Nyingchi County. In 2015, it was upgraded to a district, adopting the name "Bayi", derived from the district's main urban area, Bayi Town. This town, developed post-1950s, became a key logistical and transportation node due to its strategic position on the Sichuan-Tibet Highway.

== Geography ==
Bayi is located in the middle reaches of the Yarlung Tsangpo River. Both steep cliffs and flat valleys exist in the area. The average altitude is 3000 metres above sea level. "The lowest places are just around 1,000 metres above sea level."

There are many scenic places in or near Bayi. The Seche La Mountain Scenic Spot, in the east of Nyingchi County, is a part of the Nyainqentanglha Mountain Range, the watershed of the Nyang River and the Parlung Tsangpo. The Sichuan-Tibetan Highway passes by. Standing at the mountain pass at 4,728 meters above sea level, one can admire the sunrise, sea of clouds, endless forest and the grand Namjagbarwa Peak.

Güncang township and Pelung Township by the Sichuan-Tibet Highway are home to the Moinba ethnic group.

== Administrative divisions ==
Bayi District contains 2 subdistricts, 4 towns, 2 townships, and 1 ethnic township.

Name	Chinese	Hanyu Pinyin	Tibetan	Wylie	Population (2010)	Notes
Subdistricts
Baimagang Subdistrict	白玛岗街道	Báimǎgǎng Jiēdào	པད་མ་སྒང་ཁྲོམ་ལམ་།	pad ma sgang khrom lam		split from Chagyib Town in 2016.
Jomo Subdistrict	觉木街道	Juémù Jiēdào	ཇོ་མོ་ཁྲོམ་ལམ་།	jo mo khrom lam		split from Chagyib Town in 2016.
Towns
Nyingchi Town	林芝镇	Línzhī zhèn	ཉིང་ཁྲི་གྲོང་རྡལ།	nying khri grong rdal	3,267	
Bêba Town	百巴镇	Bǎibā zhèn	སྤྲེ་པ་གྲོང་རྡལ།	spre pa grong rdal	3,748	
Chagyib Town (Bayi)	八一镇	Bāyī zhèn	བྲག་ཡིབ་གྲོང་རྡལ།	brag yib grong rdal	39,110	Former Bayi Subdistrict
Lunang Town	鲁朗镇	Lǔlǎng zhèn	ཀླུ་ནང་གྲོང་རྡལ།	klu nang grong rdal	1,588	
Townships
Puqu Township	布久乡	Bùjiǔ xiāng	བུ་ཆུ་ཤང་།	bu chu shang	3,128	
Mairi Township	米瑞乡	Mǐruì xiāng	སྨད་རི་ཤང་།	smad ri shang	2,247	
Ethnic township
Güncang Monba Ethnic Township	更章门巴族乡	Gēngzhāng Ménbāzú xiāng	དགུན་ཚང་མོན་པ་མི་རིགས་ཤང་།	dgun tshang mon pa mi rigs shang	1,614	

== Culture ==
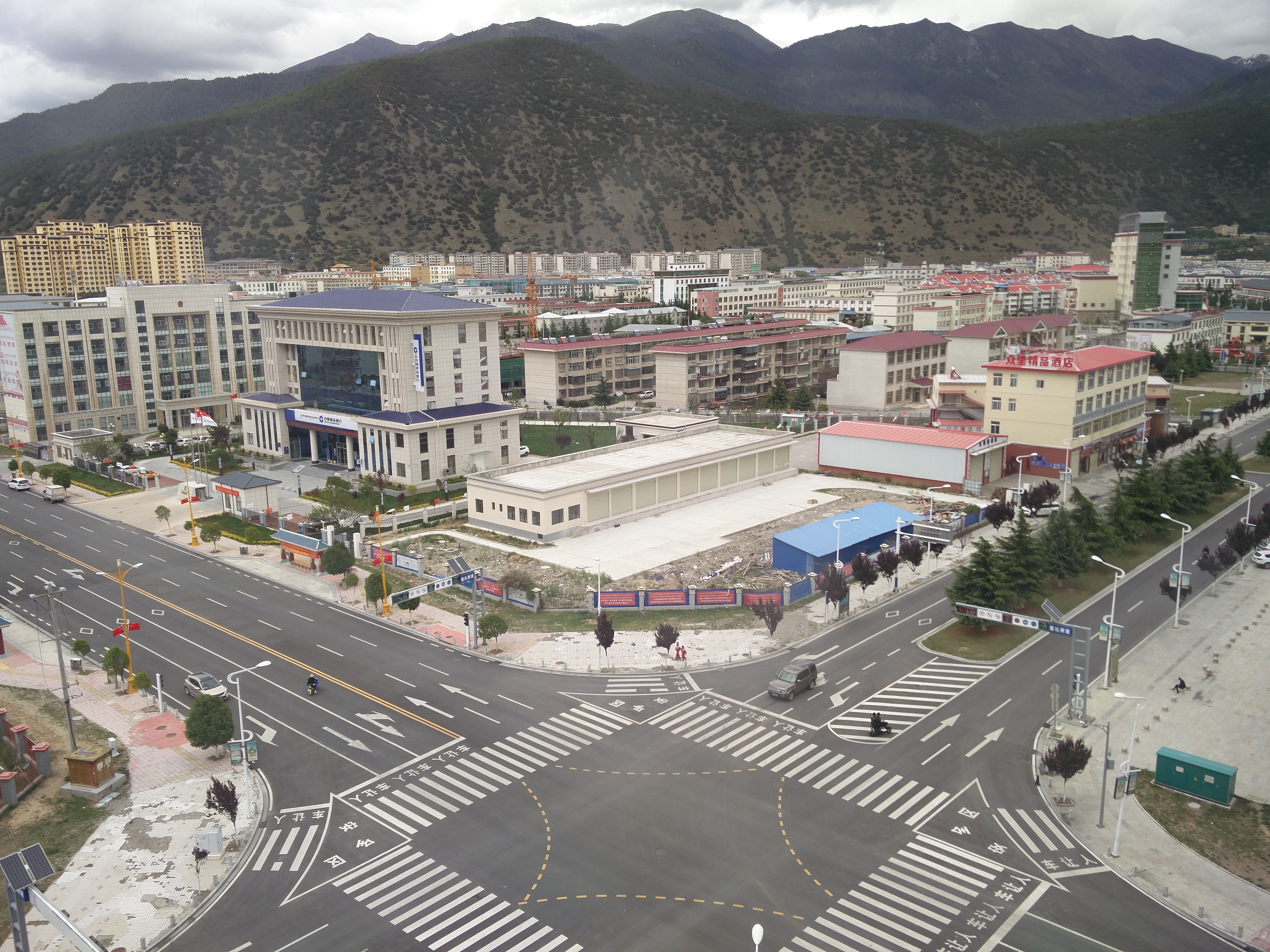
Downtown in Bayi District

Buchu Monastery is located about 28 km (17 mi) south of Bayi Town. Lamaling Monastery is located in Puqu Township.

"The Benri La Mountain near the Dagzê Village on the western slope of the mountain is a sacred site of the Tibetan Bön Sect and one of the four great holy mountains in Tibet." It is located in the southeast of Pulha, north of the Yarlung Tsangpo River. Pilgrimages attract devotees throughout the year. "Every tenth day of the eighth month of the Tibetan calendar, a grand mountain worshiping activity is held, which is called "Nangbolhasoi," meaning "seeking for treasures from immortals." "Each year during the Saga Dawa Festival the pilgrims will come to worship and circle around the holy mountain." Seven Bon temples were built around the mountain.

== Climate ==
Bayi District has a mild subtropical highland climate (Köppen Cwb). "Under the influence of the monsoon from the Indian Ocean, the area has neither scorching summer nor freezing winter. With ample rainfall, the air is quite humid. The sunshine is long and the frost is short."

Climate data for Nyingchi County (1971−2000)
Month	Jan	Feb	Mar	Apr	May	Jun	Jul	Aug	Sep	Oct	Nov	Dec	Year
Mean daily maximum °C (°F)	8.3 (46.9)	9.5 (49.1)	13.0 (55.4)	16.4 (61.5)	19.2 (66.6)	21.4 (70.5)	22.1 (71.8)	22.0 (71.6)	20.3 (68.5)	17.3 (63.1)	13.4 (56.1)	9.8 (49.6)	16.1 (60.9)
Mean daily minimum °C (°F)	−5 (23)	−2.7 (27.1)	0.6 (33.1)	3.4 (38.1)	6.7 (44.1)	10.3 (50.5)	11.5 (52.7)	11.0 (51.8)	9.5 (49.1)	5.3 (41.5)	−0.6 (30.9)	−4.4 (24.1)	3.8 (38.8)
Average precipitation mm (inches)	1.6 (0.06)	4.4 (0.17)	17.0 (0.67)	47.1 (1.85)	74.3 (2.93)	125.2 (4.93)	133.9 (5.27)	123.3 (4.85)	114.6 (4.51)	39.9 (1.57)	5.3 (0.21)	1.4 (0.06)	688.0 (27.09)
Average precipitation days (≥ 0.1 mm)	2.8	6.0	11.5	17.3	19.6	23.0	22.8	21.5	22.2	14.0	4.0	1.7	166.4
Source: Weather China

== Education ==
Xizang Agricultural and Husbandry University, or Tibet College of Agriculture and Animal Husbandry, is a full-time undergraduate public provincial college in the People's Republic of China, located in Bayi District.

== Transport ==
- China National Highway 318

The Lhasa–Nyingchi railway commenced operations in 2021, featuring Nyingchi station in Bayi District.

== Gallery ==
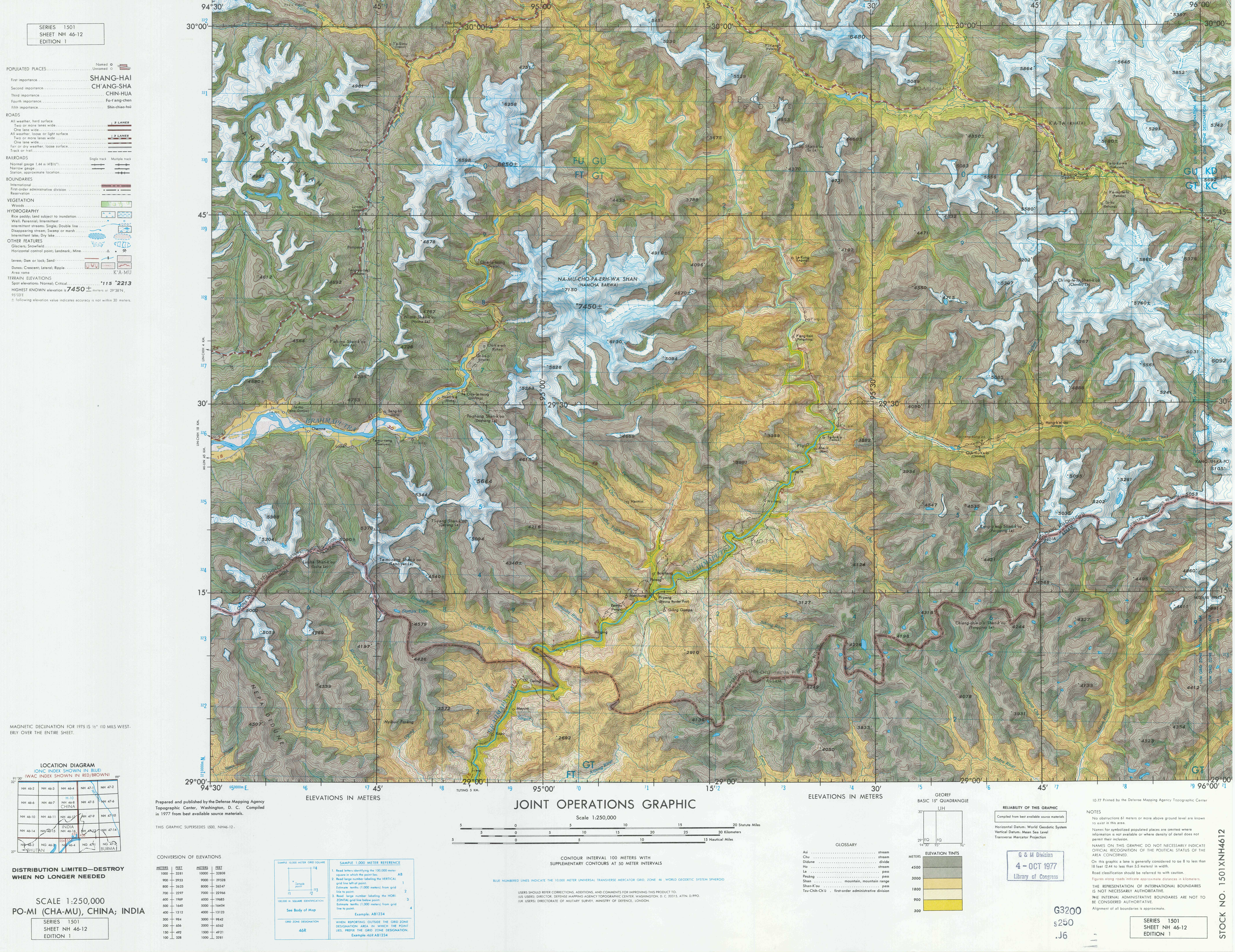
