= Bəyi =

- Municipality
- Location within Azerbaijan
- Coordinates: 40°06′07″N 48°13′51″E
- Country: Azerbaijan
- Rayon: Kurdamir
- Time zone: UTC+4 (AZT)
  - Summer (DST): UTC+5 (AZT)

Bəyi (also, Bey and Beyi) is a village and municipality in the Kurdamir Rayon of Azerbaijan.
