= Nyang River =

River of Tibet

Coordinates: 29.4337°N 94.4844°E

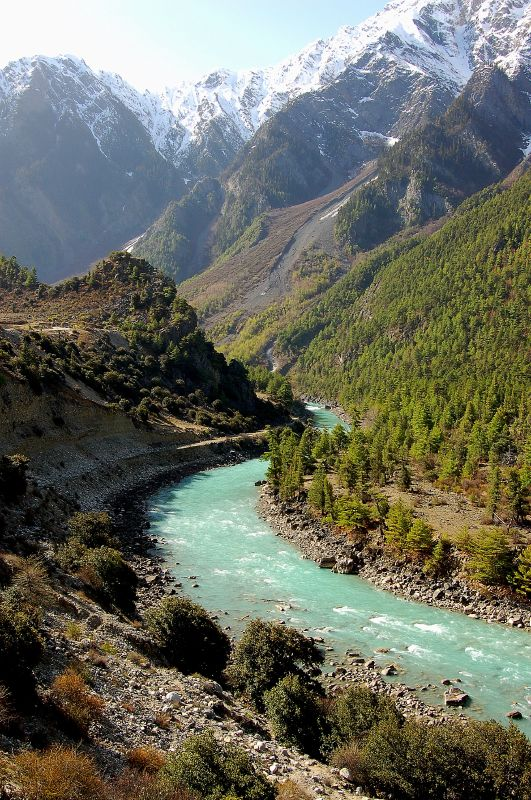
The Nyang River near Gongbogyamda.

The Nyang River (Tibetan: ཉང་ཆུ, Wylie: nyang chu; Chinese: 尼洋曲; pinyin: Niyang qu; also transliterated as Niyang) is a major river in south-west Tibet and the second largest tributary of the Yarlung Tsangpo River by discharge.

== Geography ==
The Nyang has a length of 307.5 km and originates at 5,000 meters above the sea level from the Cuomuliangla in the Goikarla Rigyu, west of the Mila Mountain. The river joins the Yarlung Tsangpo in Cemeng, Nyingchi, 2,580 meters below its source. Its largest tributary is the Ba River. It flows past the town of Bayi where it is crossed by the Bayi Zanchen bridge.

The Nyang River valley has an area of 24,800 km^{2}, including 175,700 mǔ (117 km^{2}) of cultivated land, 209,800 mǔ (140 km^{2}) of usable wasteland, 24.75 million mǔ (16,500 km^{2}) of forestry land, and 12 million mǔ (8,000 km^{2}) of usable grassland. It is also reported to contain 1,500 kinds of wild animals and plants, 310,000,000 million m^{3} of wood reserves and 18 million kw of hydroenergy resources.

== See also ==
- Kaiyuan Changhong Bridge
- List of rivers in China
