= Bayi Subdistrict =

Bayi 八一街道 · བྲག་ཡིབ་གྲོང་
- Subdistrict
- Chagyib
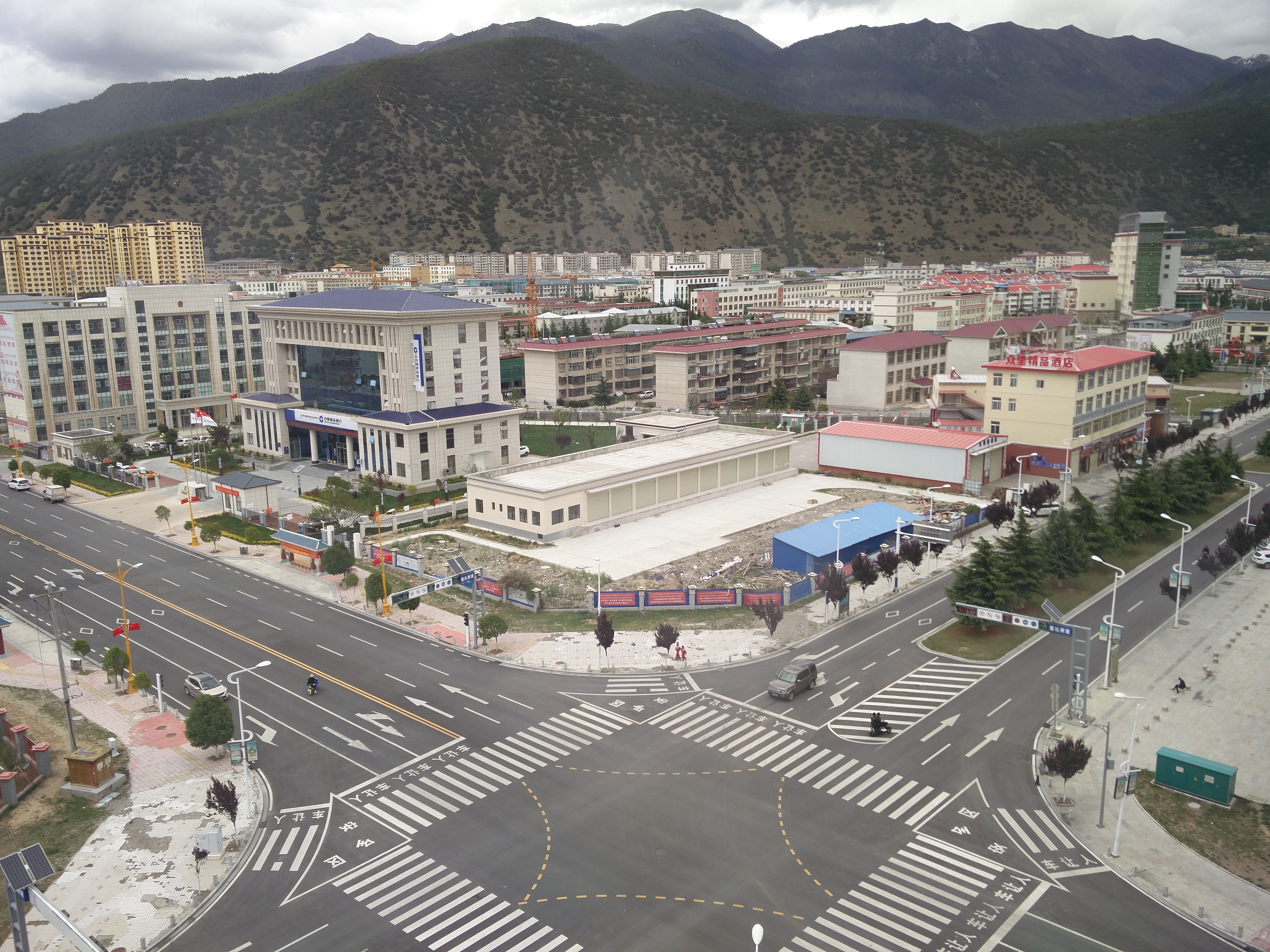
- Main center

- Location within Tibet
- Coordinates: 29°39′59″N 94°21′46″E
- Country: People's Republic of China
- Region: Tibet Autonomous Region
- Prefecture-level city: Nyingchi
- District: Bayi

Area
  - Total: 55 km^{2} (21 sq mi)
- Elevation: 2,994 m (9,823 ft)

Population
  - Total: 21,400
- Time zone: UTC+8 (CST)

Bayi

Chinese name
- Chinese: 八一
- Postal: Lhabagar
Transcriptions
Standard Mandarin
- Hanyu Pinyin: Bāyī
- Wade–Giles: Pa^{1}-i^{1}

Tibetan name
- Tibetan: བྲག་ཡིབ་གྲོང།

Bayi or Chagyib (Chinese: 八一街道; Tibetan: བྲག་ཡིབ་གྲོང་) is a subdistrict in Tibet Autonomous Region, China and seat of Bayi District, Nyingchi. It lies on the Nyang River at an altitude of 2,994 metres (9,826 feet). Bayi is an important timber and wool producing town, known historically before the 1960s as Lhabagar. By road it is 405 kilometres (252 mi) east of Lhasa on the way to Chengdu.

== History ==
The new subdistrict completely absorbed the ancient village of Drakchi, which used to stand on this site. The Bayi Zanchen bridge crosses the Nyang-chu or Nyang River here.

Following the tranquil liberation of Tibet in 1951, the People's Liberation Army commenced the construction of roads and bridges, establishing cities in the region. Consequently, people from the surrounding areas gradually relocated, and "Lhabagar" evolved into a significant transportation center in Tibet. To honor the contributions of the PLA, the residents of Linzhi transformed this location into Bayi New Village, which subsequently evolved into Bayi Town ("Bayi" signifies the anniversary of the establishment of the People's Liberation Army).

There are 9 villages under the jurisdiction of the subdistrict, with a total population of 21,400, from the Han, Hui, Mongolian, Xibe, and Manchu ethnicities. The subdistrict covers an area of 55 square kilometres (21 sq mi), with an area of 51,047 mu (3,403 ha) of cultivated land. There has been the extension of two major irrigation channels in the subdistrict to provide for rice farming and the production of other cash crops.

== Climate ==
Bayi has a subtropical highland climate with monsoonal influences (Köppen Cwb). Precipitation is abundant compared to other areas in Tibet and the area around Bayi is covered with trees.

Climate data for Bayi (1971−2000)
Month	Jan	Feb	Mar	Apr	May	Jun	Jul	Aug	Sep	Oct	Nov	Dec	Year
Record high °C (°F)	16.3 (61.3)	20.2 (68.4)	20.8 (69.4)	25.3 (77.5)	27.0 (80.6)	28.3 (82.9)	30.3 (86.5)	29.5 (85.1)	27.6 (81.7)	24.0 (75.2)	19.9 (67.8)	16.0 (60.8)	30.3 (86.5)
Mean daily maximum °C (°F)	8.3 (46.9)	9.5 (49.1)	13.0 (55.4)	16.4 (61.5)	19.2 (66.6)	21.4 (70.5)	22.1 (71.8)	22.0 (71.6)	20.3 (68.5)	17.3 (63.1)	13.4 (56.1)	9.8 (49.6)	16.1 (61.0)
Daily mean °C (°F)	0.5 (32.9)	2.3 (36.1)	5.5 (41.9)	8.5 (47.3)	11.8 (53.2)	14.8 (58.6)	15.8 (60.4)	15.3 (59.5)	13.5 (56.3)	10.0 (50.0)	5.2 (41.4)	1.4 (34.5)	8.7 (47.7)
Mean daily minimum °C (°F)	−5 (23)	−2.7 (27.1)	0.6 (33.1)	3.4 (38.1)	6.7 (44.1)	10.3 (50.5)	11.5 (52.7)	11.0 (51.8)	9.5 (49.1)	5.3 (41.5)	−0.6 (30.9)	−4.4 (24.1)	3.8 (38.8)
Record low °C (°F)	−13.7 (7.3)	−11.3 (11.7)	−8.7 (16.3)	−4.2 (24.4)	−1.6 (29.1)	3.5 (38.3)	4.4 (39.9)	5.0 (41.0)	1.0 (33.8)	−4.8 (23.4)	−8.3 (17.1)	−11.6 (11.1)	−13.7 (7.3)
Average precipitation mm (inches)	1.6 (0.06)	4.4 (0.17)	17.0 (0.67)	47.1 (1.85)	74.3 (2.93)	125.2 (4.93)	133.9 (5.27)	123.3 (4.85)	114.6 (4.51)	39.9 (1.57)	5.3 (0.21)	1.4 (0.06)	688 (27.08)
Average precipitation days (≥ 0.1 mm)	2.8	6.0	11.5	17.3	19.6	23.0	22.8	21.5	22.2	14.0	4.0	1.7	166.4
Source: Weather China

== See also ==
- List of towns in Tibet by elevation
