= Gongbo'gyamda County =

Gongbo'gyamda County 工布江达县 • ཀོང་པོ་རྒྱ་མདའ་རྫོང་།
- County
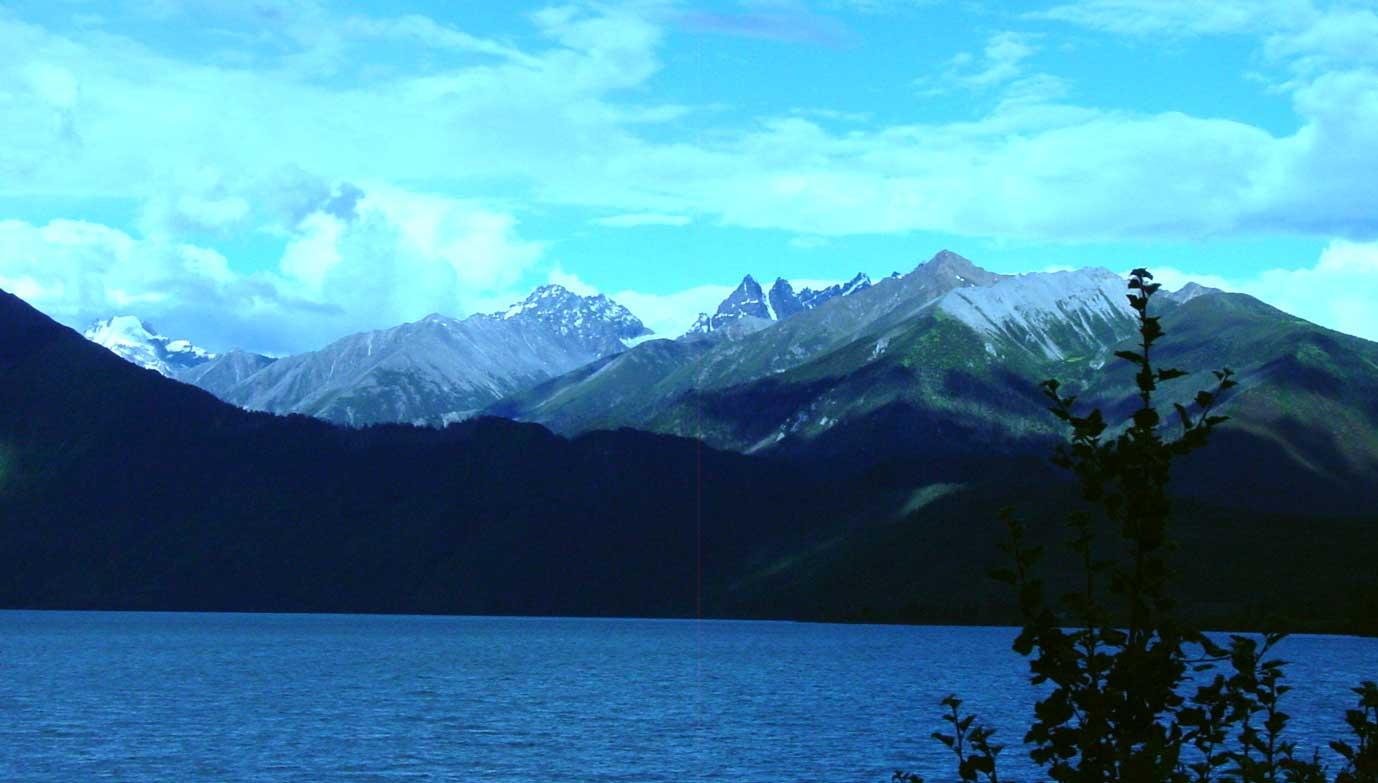
- Basum Tso

- Location of the seat in Tibet Gongbo'gyamda (China)
- Coordinates: 30°23′38″N 93°27′10″E
- Country: China
- Autonomous region: Tibet
- Prefecture-level city: Nyingchi
- County seat: Gongbo'gyamda

Area
  - Total: 12,960.19 km^{2} (5,003.96 sq mi)

Population (2020)
  - Total: 32,874
  - Density: 2.5365/km^{2} (6.5696/sq mi)
- Time zone: UTC+8 (China Standard)
- Website: www.gongbujiangda.gov.cn

Gongbo'gyamda County

Chinese name
- Simplified Chinese: 工布江达县
- Traditional Chinese: 工布江達縣
Transcriptions
Standard Mandarin
- Hanyu Pinyin: Gōngbùjiāngdá Xiàn

Tibetan name
- Tibetan: ཀོང་པོ་རྒྱ་མདའ་རྫོང་།
Transcriptions
- Wylie: kong po rgya mda' rdzong
- Tibetan Pinyin: Gongbo'gyamda Zong

Gongbo'gyamda County (Tibetan: ཀོང་པོ་རྒྱ་མདའ་རྫོང; Chinese: 工布江达县) is a county of Nyingchi (or Nyingtri) City in the Tibet Autonomous Region, China, lying approximately 275 km (171 mi) east of Lhasa at its central point. Its main geographical feature is Basum Tso, a green lake about 3,700 m (12,100 ft) above sea level.

== History ==
In 1587, Gyampo Monastery was established. Subsequently, a town named "Gyamda", meaning "valley outlet of Gyampo", was developed near the monastery. The region was originally under control of Derge Gyalpos. After the Qing Dynasty took over Derge, the region was managed by the Tibetan Government as Gyamda Dzong. In 1960, Gyamda Dzong merged with West Dengke Dzong to form the modern Gongbo'gyamda Dzong.

== Geography ==
Gongbo'gyamda County is located in the east of the Tibet Autonomous Region, to the south of the Nyenchen Tanglha Mountains, to the north of the Yarlung Tsangpo River and in the area of the middle branches of the Nyang River. With a population of 22,000, the county covers an area of 12,886 square kilometres. The average altitude of the county is 3,500 metres above sea level. Pagsum Lake had an area of 26 square kilometres.

== Administrative divisions ==
Gongbo'gyamda County contains 3 towns and 6 townships.

Name	Chinese	Hanyu Pinyin	Tibetan	Wylie
Towns
Gongbo'gyamda Town	工布江达镇	Gōngbùjiāngdá zhèn	ཀོང་པོ་རྒྱ་མདའ་གྲོང་རྡལ།	kong po rgya mda' grong rdal
Chimda Town	金达镇	Jīndá zhèn	སྥྱི་མདའ་གྲོང་རྡལ།	sphyi mda' grong rdal
Zhoka Town	巴河镇	Bāhé zhèn	ཞོ་ཁ་གྲོང་རྡལ།	zho kha grong rdal
Townships
Drugla Township	朱拉乡	Zhūlā xiāng	འབྲུག་ལ་ཤང་།	'brug la shang
Tsongo Township	错高乡	Cuògāo xiāng	མཚོ་འགོ་ཤང་།	mtsho 'go shang
Drongsar Township	仲萨乡	Zhòngsà xiāng	གྲོང་གསར་ཤང་།	grong gsar shang
Gyamda Township	江达乡	Jiāngdá xiāng	རྒྱ་མདའ་ཤང་།	gya mda' shang
Nyangpo Township	娘蒲乡	Niángpú xiāng	ཉང་པོ་ཤང་།	nyang po shang
Gyashing Township	加兴乡	Jiāxīng xiāng	རྒྱ་ཤིང་ཤང་།	gya shing shang

=== Villages ===
- Zhongsa Village
