= Nyingchi =

Nyingchi 林芝市 · ཉིང་ཁྲི་གྲོང་ཁྱེར།
- Prefecture-level city
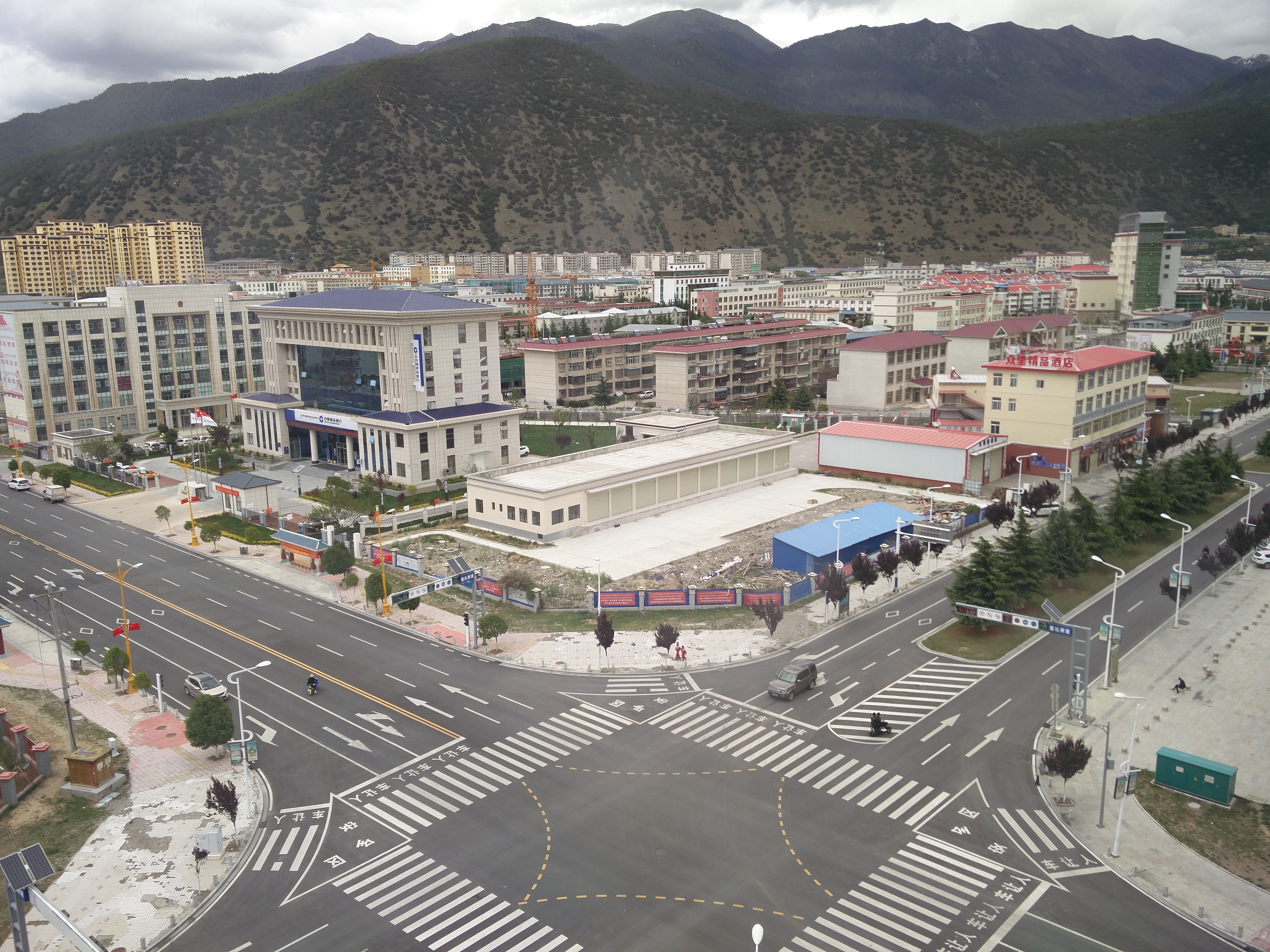
- An intersection in Bayi, Bayi District, Nyingchi

- Location of the seat in the Tibet Autonomous Region Nyingchi (China)
- Coordinates (Nyingchi municipal government): 29°38′56″N 94°21′41″E
- Country: China
- Autonomous region: Tibet
- Prefecture-level city: Nyingchi
- City seat: Bayi District (Bayi Town)

Area
  - Total: 116,175 km^{2} (44,855 sq mi)

Population
  - Total: 200,000
  - Density: 1.7/km^{2} (4.5/sq mi)

GDP
  - Total: CN¥ 10.4 billion US$ 1.7 billion
  - Per capita: CN¥ 49,039; US$ 7,873
- Time zone: UTC+8 (China Standard)
- ISO 3166 code: CN-XZ-04

Nyingchi

Chinese name
- Chinese: 林芝
Transcriptions
Standard Mandarin
- Hanyu Pinyin: Línzhī

Tibetan name
- Tibetan: ཉིང་ཁྲི་ས།
Transcriptions
- Wylie: nying khri
- Tibetan Pinyin: Nyingchi

Nyingchi (Tibetan: ཉིང་ཁྲི་གྲོང་ཁྱེར།, Wylie: nying khri grong khyer), also known as Linzhi (Chinese: 林芝; pinyin: Línzhī) or Nyingtri, is a prefecture-level city in the southeast of the Tibet Autonomous Region in China. The administrative seat of Nyingchi is Bayi District.

Nyingchi is the location of Buchu Monastery.

== History ==
The area around Nyingchi has been settled since Tibet's prehistoric era. Researchers discovered several human bones and burial groups from the Neolithic Age near the Nyang River in the 1970s, suggesting that humans in Nyingchi were engaged in slash-and-burn agriculture and led a relatively sedentary lifestyle as early as 4,000-5,000 years ago. Unearthed artifacts, including net pendants and arrowheads, indicate that the inhabitants of this region, along the ancient Nyang River, Yarlung Zangbo River, and ancient lakes, were involved in both cultivation and fishing activities along the riverbanks.

Initially, Nyingchi was under the dominion of the King of Kongpo. In the Sakyapa and Phagmodrupa periods (13th-16th centuries), Nyingchi emerged as the dominion of the Karma Kagyu sect of Tibetan Buddhism. Subsequently, in the 17th century, the Ganden Podrang was instituted, leading to the partitioning of Nyingchi into the territories of three families including Ngapoi. Nyingchi was further subdivided into Zela (རྩེ་ལ་), Qomo (ཇོ་མོ་), Xoka (ཞོ་ཁ་), and Gyamda (རྒྱ་མདའ་) dzongs. The Bomê region had long been governed by the local leader Kanam Depa and was in a condition of secession.

In 1931, the Tibetan government annexed Bomê and partitioned it into two administrative divisions: Bodoi and Bomê, while the Mêdog area was reclassified as Mêdog dzong.

Tibet was annexed by China in May 1951. In January 1960, the Tagong Special Department was established, and in February 1960, it was restructured as the Nyingchi Prefecture, with the Special Department located in Nyingchi County. In March 2015, State Council of China sanctioned the dissolution of Nyingchi Prefecture and the creation of Nyingchi City at the prefecture level, as well as the dissolution of Nyingchi County and the establishment of Bayi District.

== Economy ==
=== Tourism ===
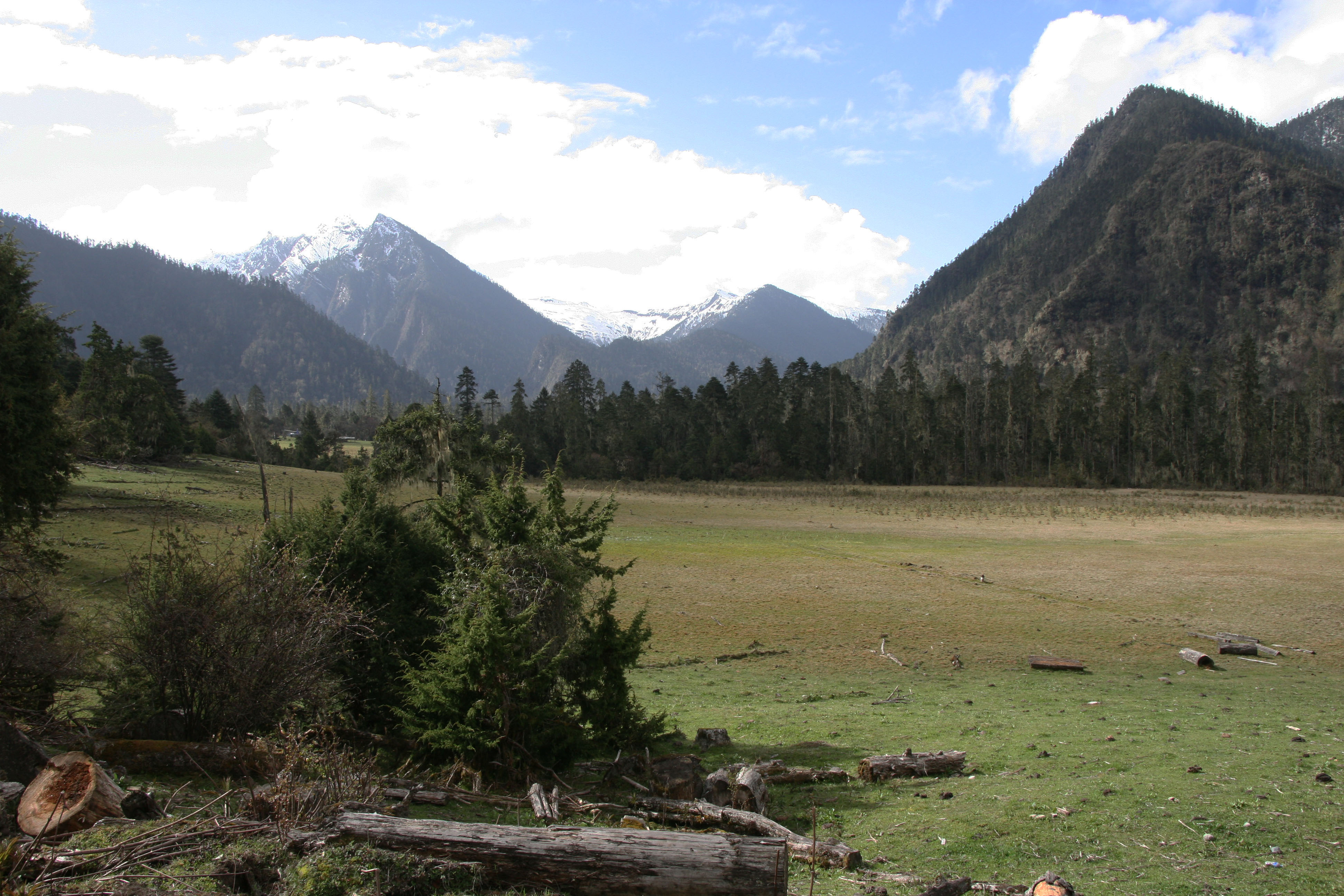
Nyingchi mountains

The average elevation of Nyingchi is 3,040 meters (9,974 feet), which is the lowest compared with the other prefectures in Tibet. The relatively low elevation compared to other regions of the Tibetan plateau yields a lower risk of altitude sickness. Guangdong province announced in 2012 that it plans to invest more than RMB 400 million (US$63 million) in Nyingchi's tourism industry. According to the plan, Guangdong will help build 22 "prosperous model villages" in Nyingchi in counties such as Bomê and Zayü.

Nyingchi Convention and Exhibition Center (Chinese: 林芝会展中心; Tibetan: ལིན་ཀྲི་ཧྲུའེ་ལམ་ཞིབ་འཛིན་ཁང་), originally called the Nyingchi Guangdong Cultural Exhibition Center (Chinese: 林芝广东会展中心), is a convention center in the city. The province of Guandong contributed funds to the building of the center. In 2018, the opening ceremony of the first Trans-Himalaya Extreme Cycling Race was held at the center's square. In 2023, young artists from Zhuhai, Hong Kong and Macao went to Nyingchi for performances and exchanges.

== Transportation ==
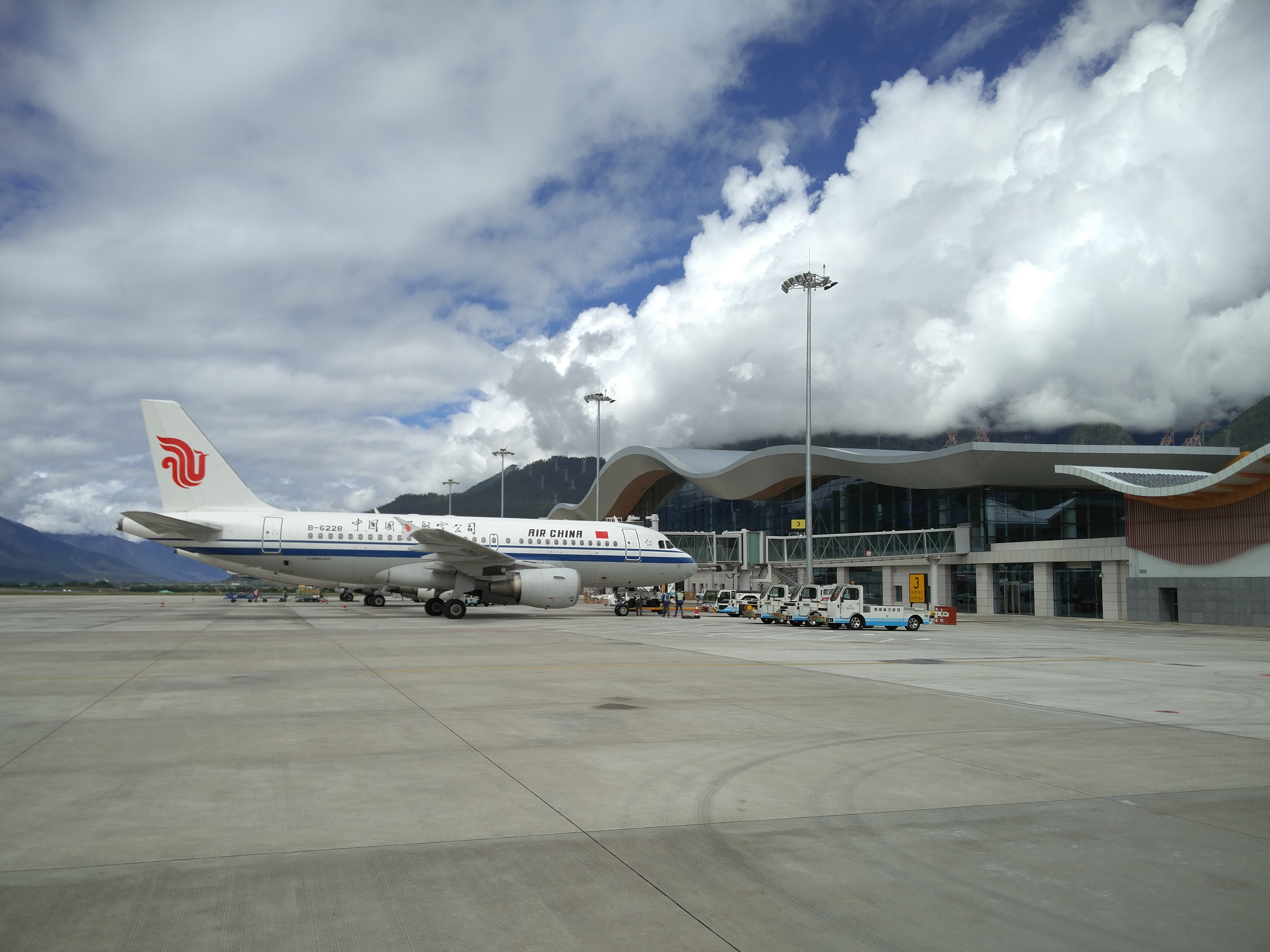
Nyingchi Mainling Airport

The opening ceremony was held on the morning of September 9, 2015 for the La-Lin Highway (Lhasa to Mozhugongka section) and (Gongbu Jiangda to Linzhi section) connecting Lhasa-Linzhi. It takes about 5 hours to travel from Lhasa to Nyingchi by a highway opened at the end of 2018. Nyingchi is connected to Lhasa by the 435-kilometer Lhasa–Nyingchi railway, completed in 2021. The journey from Lhasa by train takes 2.5 hours.

The Linzhi Milin Airport was opened in Nyingchi in March 2017. Linzhi Airport initiated RNP navigation procedures in 2006, becoming the first airport in China to operate exclusively with RNP. It is presently the sole transportation airport globally where all aircraft takeoffs and landings are mandated to adhere to RNP AR procedures, necessitating compliance with specific aircraft and crew qualifications. In 2018, the construction of the Engineered materials arrestor system (EMAS) was completed at the Miling Airport.

== Climate ==
Köppen-Geiger climate classification system classifies its climate as subtropical highland (Cwb).

Climate data for Nyingchi, elevation 2,992 m (9,816 ft), (1991–2020 normals, extremes 1981–present)
Month	Jan	Feb	Mar	Apr	May	Jun	Jul	Aug	Sep	Oct	Nov	Dec	Year
Record high °C (°F)	19.4 (66.9)	22.1 (71.8)	24.0 (75.2)	25.3 (77.5)	28.4 (83.1)	29.0 (84.2)	31.4 (88.5)	30.4 (86.7)	30.2 (86.4)	24.5 (76.1)	20.8 (69.4)	16.7 (62.1)	31.4 (88.5)
Mean daily maximum °C (°F)	8.9 (48.0)	10.9 (51.6)	13.8 (56.8)	17.0 (62.6)	19.7 (67.5)	21.7 (71.1)	22.5 (72.5)	22.4 (72.3)	20.7 (69.3)	17.5 (63.5)	14.0 (57.2)	10.3 (50.5)	16.6 (61.9)
Daily mean °C (°F)	1.1 (34.0)	3.3 (37.9)	6.3 (43.3)	9.3 (48.7)	12.4 (54.3)	15.4 (59.7)	16.5 (61.7)	16.0 (60.8)	14.3 (57.7)	10.5 (50.9)	5.8 (42.4)	2.0 (35.6)	9.4 (48.9)
Mean daily minimum °C (°F)	−4.6 (23.7)	−2.1 (28.2)	1.2 (34.2)	4.3 (39.7)	7.5 (45.5)	11.2 (52.2)	12.5 (54.5)	12.0 (53.6)	10.4 (50.7)	5.8 (42.4)	−0.1 (31.8)	−3.8 (25.2)	4.5 (40.1)
Record low °C (°F)	−15.3 (4.5)	−13.3 (8.1)	−10.1 (13.8)	−4.6 (23.7)	−1.6 (29.1)	2.7 (36.9)	3.9 (39.0)	2.9 (37.2)	−1.0 (30.2)	−5.0 (23.0)	−10.4 (13.3)	−15.3 (4.5)	−15.3 (4.5)
Average precipitation mm (inches)	2.0 (0.08)	4.1 (0.16)	21.2 (0.83)	47.9 (1.89)	80.1 (3.15)	125.2 (4.93)	137.4 (5.41)	128.2 (5.05)	110.3 (4.34)	37.3 (1.47)	4.3 (0.17)	0.7 (0.03)	698.7 (27.51)
Average precipitation days (≥ 0.1 mm)	3.1	5.2	11.3	16.9	19.9	23.7	23.1	21.1	20.7	12.8	3.3	1.5	162.6
Average snowy days	7.3	10.8	8.4	1.2	0.2	0	0	0	0	0.1	1.8	4.0	33.8
Average relative humidity (%)	49	51	57	62	65	72	75	75	75	65	55	51	63
Mean monthly sunshine hours	189.5	157.3	167.0	158.0	161.2	122.1	131.3	141.2	132.8	166.4	191.3	201.3	1,919.4
Percentage possible sunshine	58	50	45	41	38	29	31	35	36	48	60	64	45
Source: China Meteorological Administration NOAA August record high

== Flora and fauna ==
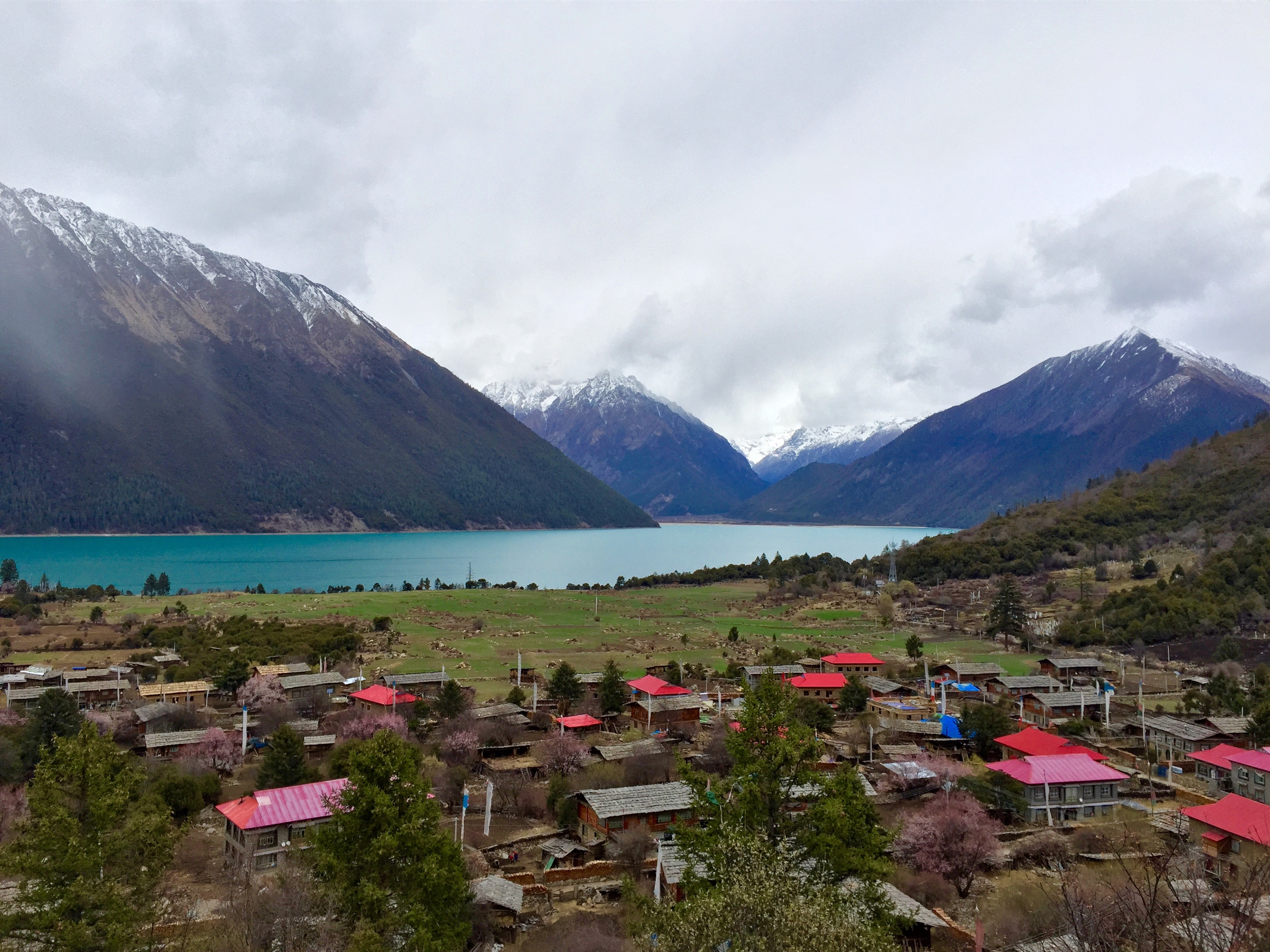
Basum Lake in Gongbo'gyamda County

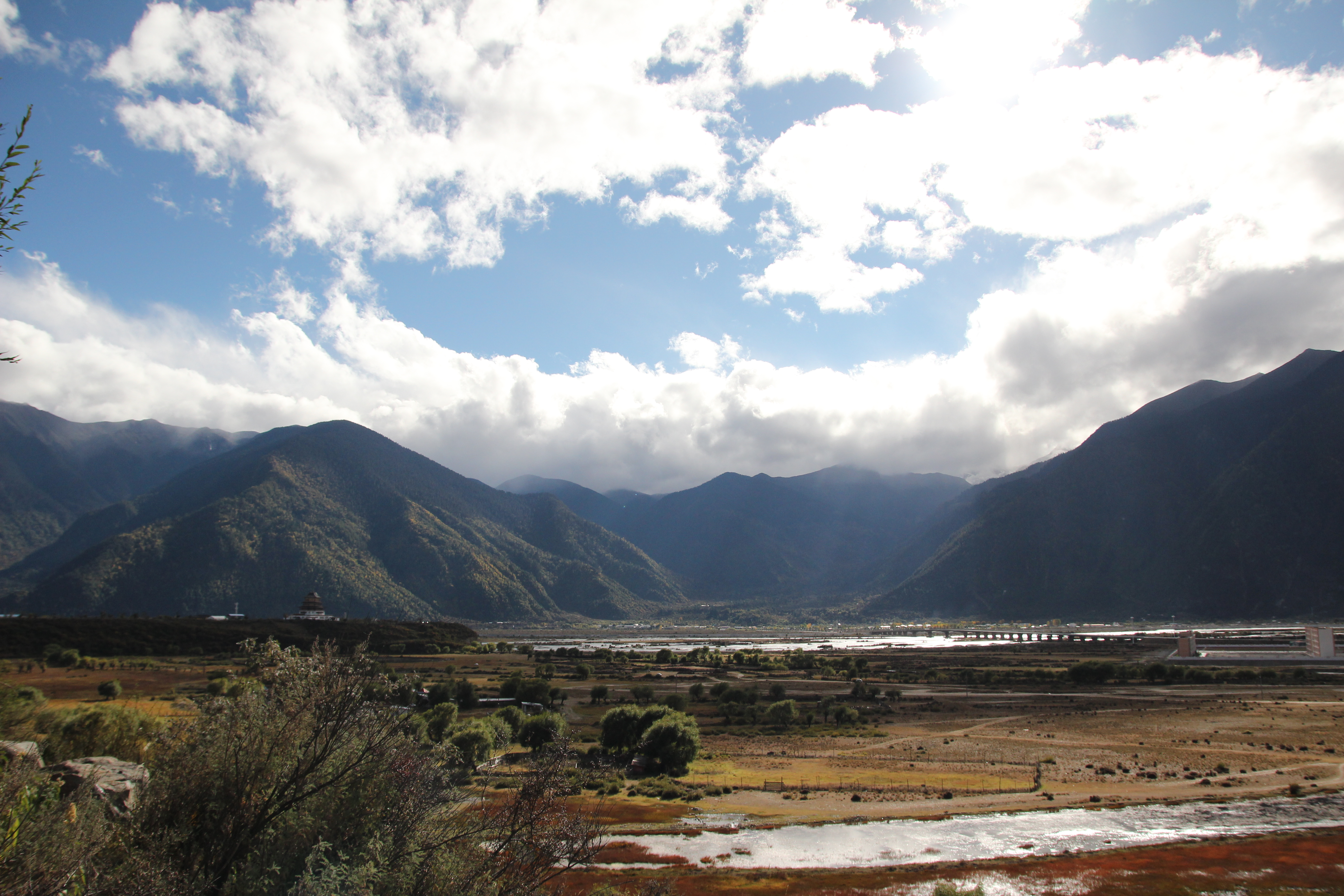
View of the Nyang River near Nyingchi

According to local forestry officials, Nyingchi hosts the country's largest primitive forest region that covers 26.4 billion cubic metres, storing over 800 million cubic metres of wood. The forests of Bome, Zayu and Lhoyu have ancient dragon spruces which reach heights of over 80 metres and diameters of 2.5 metres. Wildlife species include "the Bengal tiger, leopard, bear, snub-nosed monkey, antelope and lesser panda."

There are over 2,000 species of higher plants, including some 100 species of xylophyta, 165 species of medical herbs and fungus. Crops include rice, peanut, apple, orange, banana, and lemon. Agricultural products include medicinal materials, edible fungus, orange, tangerine, sugar cane, honey peach, apple, pear, grape, walnut and other fruits.

== Administrative subdivisions ==
Map
#	Name	Hanzi	Hanyu Pinyin	Tibetan	Wylie	Population (2010 Census)	Area (km^{2})	Density (/km^{2})
1	Bayi District	巴宜区	Bāyí Qū	བྲག་ཡིབ་ཆུས།	brag yib chus	54,702	8,536	6.40
2	Gongbo'gyamda County	工布江达县	Gōngbùjiāngdá Xiàn	ཀོང་པོ་རྒྱ་མདའ་རྫོང་།	kong po rgya mda' rdzong	29,929	12,960	2.30
3	Mainling City	米林市	Mǐlín Shì	སྨན་གླིང་གྲོང་ཁྱེར།	sman gling grong khyer	22,834	9,507	2.40
4	Mêdog County	墨脱县	Mòtuō Xiàn	མེ་ཏོག་རྫོང་།	me tog rdzong	10,963	31,394	0.34
5	Bomê County	波密县	Bōmì Xiàn	སྤོ་མེས་རྫོང་།	spo mes rdzong	33,480	16,770	1.99
6	Zayü County	察隅县	Cháyú Xiàn	རྫ་ཡུལ་རྫོང་།	rdza yul rdzong	27,255	31,305	0.87
7	Nang County	朗县	Lǎng Xiàn	སྣང་རྫོང་།	snang rdzong	15,946	4,114	3.87

Parts of the two counties of Zayü and Mêdog are considered by the Chinese government to be under Chinese jurisdiction as part of South Tibet.

== Sister cities ==
Pokhara, Nepal

== See also ==
- Laohuzui Hydropower Station
- Medog Hydropower Station
