= Bailey–Morshead exploration of Tsangpo Gorge =

1913 expedition that discovered route of Tsangpo River through Himalaya

The Bailey–Morshead exploration of the Tsangpo Gorge was an unauthorised expedition by Frederick Bailey and Henry Morshead in 1913 which for the first time established the definite route by which the Tsangpo River reaches the sea from north of Himalaya, through the Tsangpo Gorge.

== Background ==
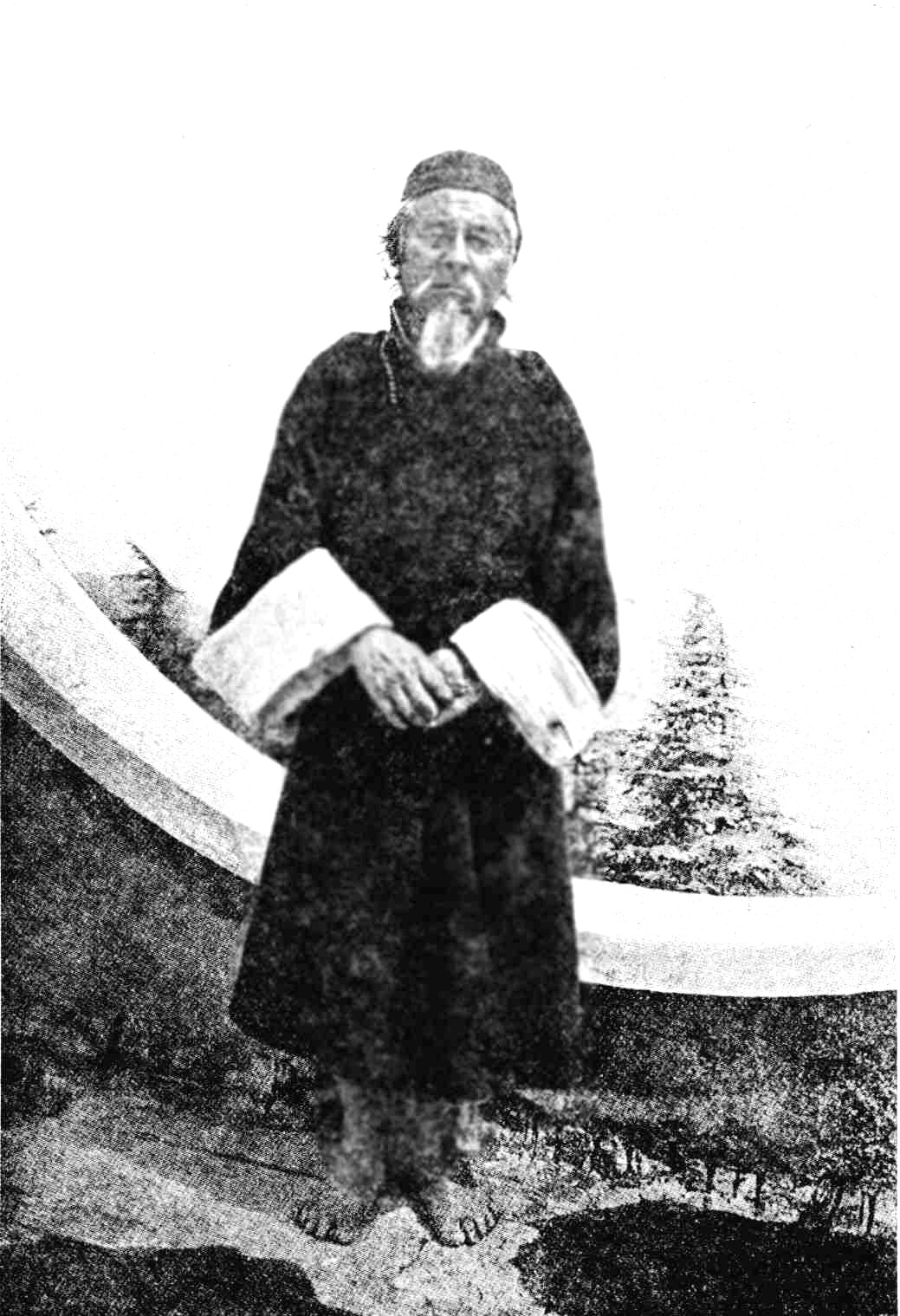
Kinthup, photographed in 1914

Sketch of rivers arising on Tibetan plateau

North of Himalaya, the Yarlung Tsangpo River flows east through the Tibetan Plateau and then turns south into a series of massive gorges in Himalayan mountains. Until the 1880s it was unknown by which route it eventually reached the sea. It could have been any of the Yangtze, Mekong, Salween, Irrawaddy or Brahmaputra rivers all of which have headwaters this region. (Note: It is thought that, before the uplift of the Himalayas, the Tsangpo flowed into the Red River which flows to Gulf of Tonkin, near Hanoi. During the Himalayan orogeny the Brahmaputra captured the Red River's headwaters.) Kinthup, a Lepcha man from Sikkim employed as a pundit, had provided some evidence that the Tsangpo flowed into the Dihang (which is a tributary of the Brahmaputra) but he was not widely believed. By 1911 the connection was widely accepted. Another mystery remained: the river dropped from 9,000 feet (2,700 m) to 1,000 feet (300 m) in a distance of perhaps 100 miles (160 km) which is extremely steep for a river of this size. It seemed there must be a massive waterfall and, indeed, Kinthup had reported one 150 feet (46 m) high.

== Abor Expedition ==
In 1911–12 as part of the Abor Expedition, the Survey of India conducted widespread surveying of the tributaries of the Brahmaputra. Morshead was in a team surveying the Dibang River while Frederick Bailey was surveying the Dihang. (Note: The Dibang and Dihang rivers are different tributaries of the Brahmaputra. Because it is now known the Tsangpo flows into the Dihang, the latter is now often regarded as a different name for the Brahmaputra in this region.) Oakes and Field of the Dihang team were first to measure the height of the 25,445-foot (7,756 m) Namcha Barwa and, from Dibang, Morshead confirmed the height – the separate measurements were able to provide a very accurate location.

== 1913 expedition ==
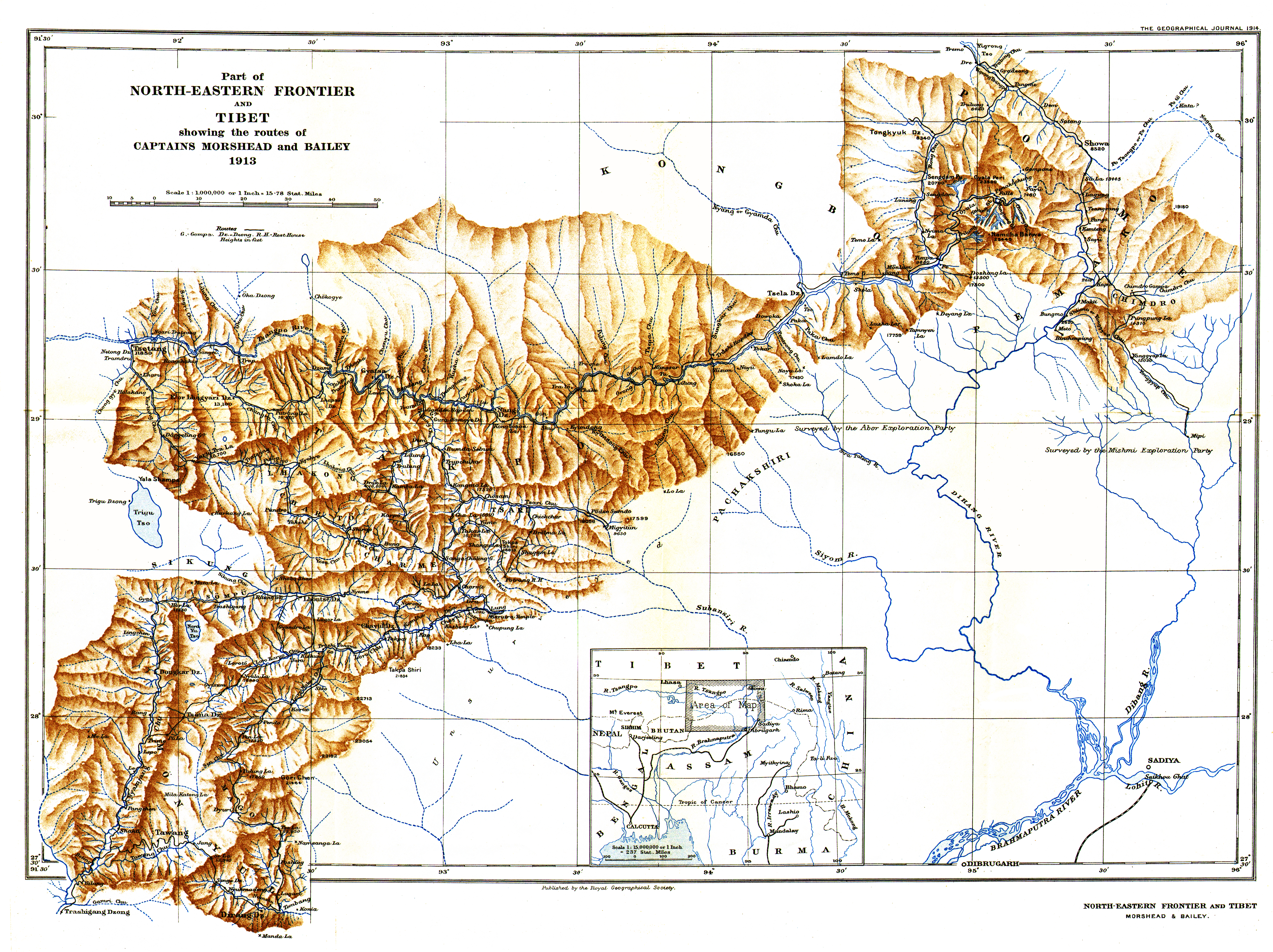
Bailey and Morshead's map of the route of the expedition

In 1913 Bailey, an intelligence officer with the Indian Army, invited Morshead to be the surveyor in an expedition to explore the Yarlung Tsangpo Grand Canyon (Tsangpo Gorge), now known to be the world's deepest gorge. (Note: 16,650 feet (5,070 m) deep. The Colorado River's Grand Canyon is 6,998 feet (2,133 m).) Bailey and Morshead explored from the south with Morshead surveying the entire route and calculating the results as they went so as not to delay progress. By ascending the Dibang river and crossing the Yonggyap Pass (29°13′00″N 95°35′00″E) and the Himalayan watershed into Tibet, they reached the Dihang and started up the Gorge.

When they were at Lagung, just east of Namcha Barwa, they were arrested by the Nyerpa of Pome who took them to Showa on the Po Tsangpo river. After they had been imprisoned for several days they were released. By following this river downstream to the west and then north they reached the Rong Chu valley where Bailey discovered a tall blue poppy – now known as Meconopsis baileyi – at a forest edge. They headed south to reach the Dihang river again, this time upstream of the Gorge and just south of Gyala Peri. Hence they penetrated the massive sweep of the Tsangpo Gorge, north east of Namcha Barwa. They were able to go downstream as far as Pemakoi-chen where they found the immense Tsangpo Gorge impassible. They were only about 45 miles (72 km) upstream of Lagung but they had to turn to the north to follow the Tsangpo upstream to Tsetang where they left the river and headed south through eastern Bhutan to Trashigang, eventually to arrive at Rangiya back in India. The expedition covered 1,680 miles (2,700 km) on foot and lasted from 16 May to 14 November 1913.

== Discoveries and outcome ==
In doing this they proved that the Dibang tributary of the Brahmaputra flows around rather than through the Himalayan mountains and does not connect with the Tsangpo. They also proved conclusively that the Tsangpo–Dibang–Brahmaputra was a single river and for the first time established its accurate course along what became known as the Yarlung Tsangpo Grand Canyon. The highest waterfall they found was 30 feet (9.1 m) and they considered there was unlikely to be a higher fall – this came as a disappointment even to the professionals. (Note: It later transpired there had been a mistranslation of Kinthup's report – the 150 feet related to a waterfall in a side stream. A 1924 expedition found a 70-foot fall two miles further downstream and in 1998 a 108-foot fall was discovered.) For his work Morshead was awarded the Macgregor Medal by the United Service Institution of India. At the time the expedition was regarded as a great feat of exploration and it drew international acclaim.
