= Medog Hydropower Station =

Dam under construction in Mêdog County, Tibet

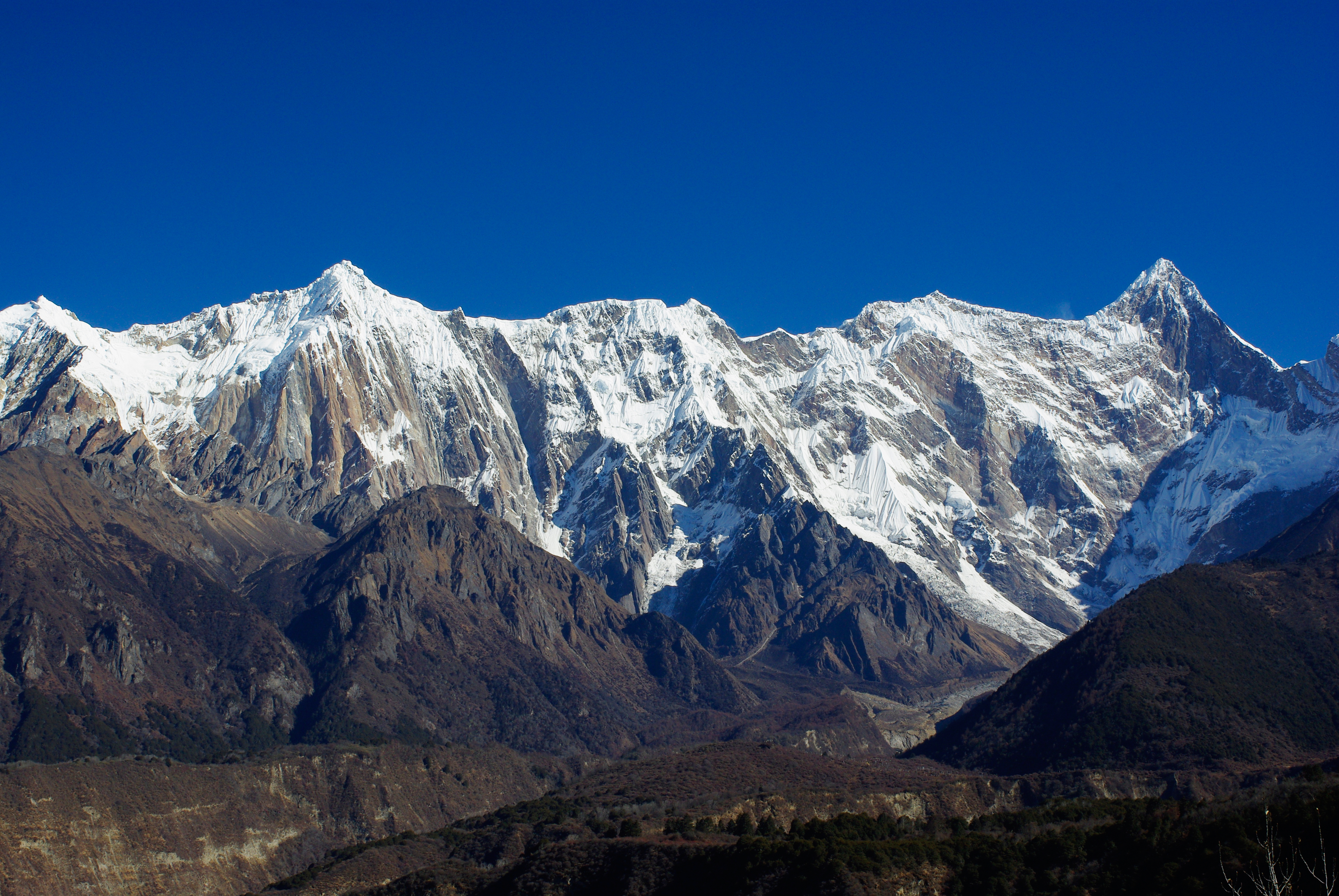

- Location within Tibet
- Official name: 墨脱水电站
- Country: China
- Location: Lower reaches of the Yarlung Tsangpo in Mêdog County
- Coordinates: 29°27′37″N 95°21′48″E
- Purpose: Hydropower
- Status: Under construction
- Construction began: 19 July 2025
- Opening date: 2033
- Construction cost: ¥1 trillion/$137 billion (planned)
- Owner: Power Construction Corporation of China

Dam and spillways
- Type of dam: Gravity dam

Power Station
- Installed capacity: 60 GW (planned)
- Annual generation: 300 TWh (1,100 PJ)(planned)

The Medog Hydropower Station (Chinese: 墨脱水电站) or Motuo Hydropower Station is a 60,000 megawatt (MW) run-of-the-river hydroelectric project under construction across the Great Bend of the Yarlung Tsangpo river (upstream Brahmaputra) in the Tibet Autonomous Region, China. The project involves tunneling the Tsangpo waters under the Namcha Barwa mountain range between the Pai Town (Pé, Paizhen) and Medog Town (Metok, Motuo), and utilising the nearly 2,000 metres (6,600 ft) drop for generating electricity. A large storage dam is being constructed near the Mainling town and two small dams at the entry and exit of the tunnels for regulation and counter-regulation purposes. Scholars note that the terminology of "mega-dam" often used in media is inappropriate because the power generation comes from the natural drop in elevation rather than from the dam.

Upon its completion, the project will become the world's largest hydropower facility, with an anticipated annual power generation capacity of 10.8 PJ or 300 billion kilowatt-hours—triple that of the Three Gorges Dam. The Chinese government authorized the project's construction in December 2024, with an estimated investment exceeding 1 trillion yuan (approximately US$137 billion). Construction officially began on 19 July 2025. The project is intended to be developed as a single-phase installation, with commercial operations planned for 2033.

== Location ==
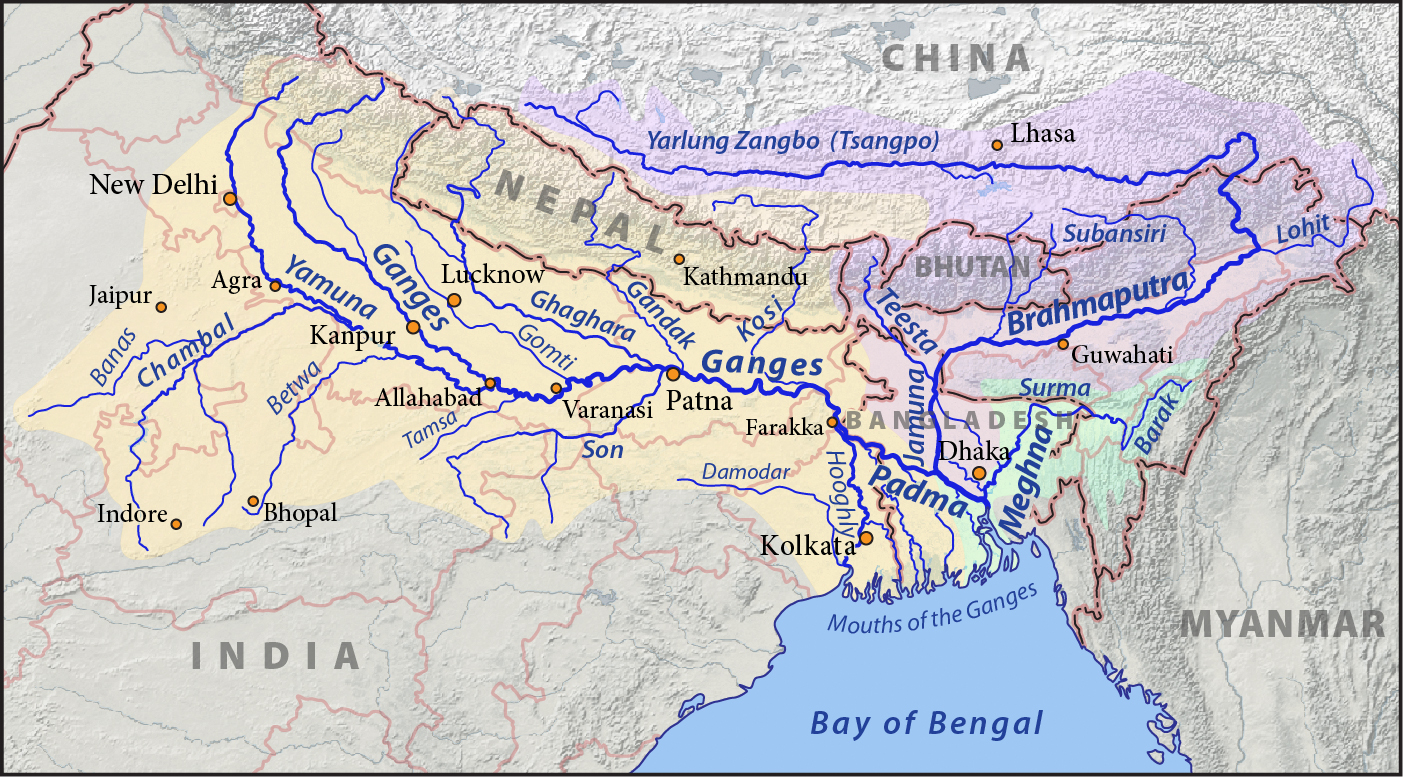
The course of Yarlung Tsangpo with the Great Bend in the east

The Medog Hydropower Station is being constructed in the Mainling and Medog Counties within the Nyingtri Prefecture, situated near the Indian border state of Arunachal Pradesh. It is the lower section of the Yarlung Tsangpo, which originates in western Tibet's glacial regions. The river bends around the eastern-most section of the Himalayas, called the Namcha Barwa range, passing through the Pai Town in the north and the Medog Town in the south. This section of the river, which is 240 km-long, is called the "Great Bend" and the Yarlung Tsangpo Grand Canyon". Within the Great Bend, the river drops 2,000 metres (6,600 ft) in elevation within a span of 50 kilometres.

After passing through the Medog County, the river enters India where it is called the Brahmaputra River. It then passes to Bangladesh where it takes the name Jamuna River. The contribution of Yarlung Tsangpo to Brahmaputra is 34 percent, the rest coming from other tributaries such as Dibang, Lohit, Subansiri etc. By the time the river reaches Bahadurabad at the entrance to Bangladesh, the contribution drops to about 5 percent.

== Overview ==
The Medog Hydropower Station represents part of China's broader hydroelectric development strategy in Tibet. Since 2000, China has initiated or proposed 193 hydropower projects in the region, with approximately 60% still in planning or preparatory phases. Construction approval was granted in December 2024, with construction officially commencing on 19 July 2025. The Chinese government has not yet released comprehensive environmental impact assessments or detailed implementation plans for the project.

The project is wholly owned and developed by Power Construction Corporation of China (PowerChina), a state-owned construction enterprise. Commercial operations are planned to begin in 2033. With a projected investment more than quadruple that of the Three Gorges Dam (which cost 250 billion yuan), the Medog Hydropower Station represents one of China's most ambitious infrastructure projects and one of the most expensive infrastructure projects in history. The facility's planned annual power output of 300 billion kilowatt-hours would establish it as the world's most productive hydroelectric installation, significantly surpassing current records.

The project intends to harness a 2,000-meter river elevation drop within a 50-kilometer stretch nicknamed "the Great Bend", granting it the ability to generate significant amounts of hydroelectric power. This section flows through the Yarlung Tsangpo Grand Canyon, recognized as Earth's deepest canyon system. The intended construction plan necessitates the excavation of four 20-kilometer tunnels through Namcha Barwa mountain to divert the Yarlung Tsangpo River. The plans include constructing a cascade of five hydropower stations.

== Impact on flow ==
Although the Yarlung Tsangpo originates inside Tibet, within Chinese borders, the majority of the Brahmaputra River's annual discharge (65–70%) is generated within India, primarily through monsoon rainfall and tributaries. Scientific studies also estimate that only about 25% of the river's total flow originates from snow and glacial melt in the upper Tibetan reaches. Due to this hydrological profile, upstream hydropower infrastructure, such as the Medog Hydropower Station, is expected to have a limited effect on downstream flows. Assam Chief Minister Himanta Biswa Sarma has remarked that the Brahmaputra is predominantly a rain-fed Indian river system, and has suggested that even if China were to reduce upstream flow, it might in fact potentially help mitigate the annual floods in Assam, which displace hundreds of thousands of people and destroy livelihoods.

However, concerns have been raised in India and Bangladesh, downstream nations that rely on the river. While China assures that the project will not impede water flow, India is concerned about potential impacts on water supply and flooding.

== Criticism ==
The project has faced resistance from various parties, which include environmental organizations, downstream nations, and Tibetan rights groups. Similar hydroelectric developments in Tibet have previously sparked protests, including recent demonstrations against the Kamtok Dam project on the Drichu/Yangtze River that led to over 1,000 arrests. Additionally, India and Bangladesh have also voiced apprehension about the project's potential effects on their water resources.

The Medog project is planned to be build in one of the most biodiverse areas in the world and the impact on the populations of the rare species might be devastating.

CNN reported that Chinese leader Xi Jinping called for the project to be advanced "forcefully, systematically, and effectively" during a visit earlier in 2025 to Tibet.

=== Cultural impact and displacement ===
Tibetan rights organizations characterized the project as an example of resource exploitation at the expense of Buddhist cultural heritage and local communities.

While specific displacement figures remain undisclosed, the project will require relocating the population in the affected area. For comparison, the Three Gorges Dam project resulted in approximately 1.4 million relocations, although the Medog region's lower population density and absence of a reservoir suggest fewer displacements may be required. The development threatens to impact culturally significant sites in what Tibetans consider one of their most sacred regions. According to the International Campaign for Tibet, the 193 combined projects in the region could potentially displace over 1.2 million people and affect numerous religious sites if completed.

The upcoming Medog hydropower station in Tibet has also raised concerns among the Adi tribal community in Arunachal Pradesh, India, who fear that the dam could significantly reduce water flow in the Siang River, threatening their traditional livelihoods and agricultural practices. Local leaders have warned that sudden releases of water from the dam could cause catastrophic flooding, endangering lives, property, and cultural heritage in the Siang belt, where the Adi and similar tribes reside.

=== Environmental ===
Human rights groups have expressed concerns about the Medog project causing significant ecological damage to the region, one of the most diverse in the Tibetan Plateau.

Environmental concerns have also been raised about the irreversible impact of dam construction in the Yarlung Tsangpo gorge, where the river descends 2,000 meters over a 50-kilometre span. The region includes a national nature reserve and is considered one of China's most important biodiversity hotspots.

Dr. Jogendranath Sharma, a geologist, warned that the project, located in a seismically active region, poses serious risks to downstream Assam—including erosion, ecological disruption, and potential disaster in the event of an earthquake—urging a joint Indo-China environmental impact assessment. The gorge's steep, narrow topography caused geological experts to warn about increased landslide risks. In 2022, engineers from the Sichuan provincial geological bureau specifically highlighted the dangers of "earthquake-induced landslides and mud-rock flows" as significant threats to the project's stability.

Aravind Yelery, associate professor at the Centre for East Asian Studies at Jawaharlal Nehru University, stated that the dam could trap nutrient-rich sediments essential for soil fertility in downstream regions such as Assam and Bangladesh, potentially affecting irrigation. He added that the project may also reduce crop yields, harm agricultural productivity, and disrupt riverine ecosystems.

Chinese state media has emphasised that the dam is "a safe project that prioritises ecological protection", and stressed that it will boost the local economy and aid Beijing's climate neutrality goals, however, have not provided details on impact.

In July 2026, the South China Morning Post reported that Chinese geologists had found an active Paizhen Fault beneath the planned Medog Hydropower Station as a major geological risk. The report said the fault could increase the risk of earthquakes, landslides, and slope failures, affecting the project's structural stability.

=== Water security ===
The project has generated apprehension among downstream nations regarding water security. Hydrological experts have drawn parallels with China's previous dam projects on the Mekong River, where upstream water control has been associated with increased drought frequency and severity in downstream regions over the past twenty years. Critics noted that India and Bangladesh could face compromised water access, biodiversity disruption, and riverbank erosion akin to those faced by Thailand, Vietnam, and Cambodia from earlier Chinese hydroelectric projects.

A 2020 analysis by the Lowy Institute indicated that China's control over Tibetan Plateau rivers could potentially provide significant geopolitical leverage over India's economy. Indian authorities responded to the project by exploring countermeasures, including the potential development of their own large-scale hydroelectric dam and reservoir system to mitigate the dam's impacts. The Chinese Ministry of Foreign Affairs asserted in 2020 that China maintains a "legitimate right" to dam the river, stating they have considered downstream effects in their planning.

In 2025, India expressed renewed concerns over China's construction of the hydropower station on the Yarlung Tsangpo River in Tibet, citing potential risks to regional water security, environmental stability, and downstream livelihoods. Indian officials and experts warned that the project could affect river flows into India, particularly the Siang and Brahmaputra rivers, which are vital for millions in the northeastern states. The Ministry of External Affairs stated that the project was being closely monitored and urged China to ensure transparency and consultation with downstream countries. External Affairs Minister S. Jaishankar raised the issue in July 2025 during his visit to China for the Shanghai Cooperation Organisation Foreign Ministers' Meeting, also calling for the resumption of suspended hydrological data sharing.

Bangladesh has expressed concerns over water security due to China's construction of the Motuo Hydropower Station, which flows downstream into Bangladesh as the Jamuna River. In February 2025, Bangladeshi officials formally requested more information from Beijing, citing potential impacts on river flow, agriculture, and livelihoods in the densely populated delta region, which depends heavily on consistent water levels from transboundary rivers originating in Tibet. China describes the Medog Hydropower Station as a run-of-the-river project with no impact on downstream flow, but Bangladesh has sought technical transparency and hydrological data to verify this. Malik Fida Khan, head of the Center for Environmental and Geographic Information Services, warned that disruptions to the Brahmaputra—source of 70 percent of dry-season flow in the Ganges-Brahmaputra-Meghna basin—could harm Bangladesh's water security. Sharif Jamil, coordinator of Riverkeeper Bangladesh, called the project “unilateral and geographically sensitive”, warning that a lack of consultation could result in ecological and socio-economic risks. If upstream interventions from China destabilize the natural flow, a professor from the University of Dhaka opines that Bangladesh's "climate-stressed water security" could collapse. Analysts have noted that the absence of a binding multilateral legal framework governing the river is itself a strategic choice. China has not ratified the United Nations Convention on the Law of the Non-Navigational Uses of International Watercourses, and has consistently declined to enter bilateral water-sharing agreements with downstream nations. One analysis argues that the asymmetry of power derived from controlling the headwaters is strategically more valuable to Beijing than any formal commitment would be, and that the dam does not create coercive capacity over downstream nations but structurally amplifies it.

== See also ==
- Hydroelectricity in China
- List of dams on the Brahmaputra River
- Three Gorges Dam
- Upper Siang Hydroelectric Project
