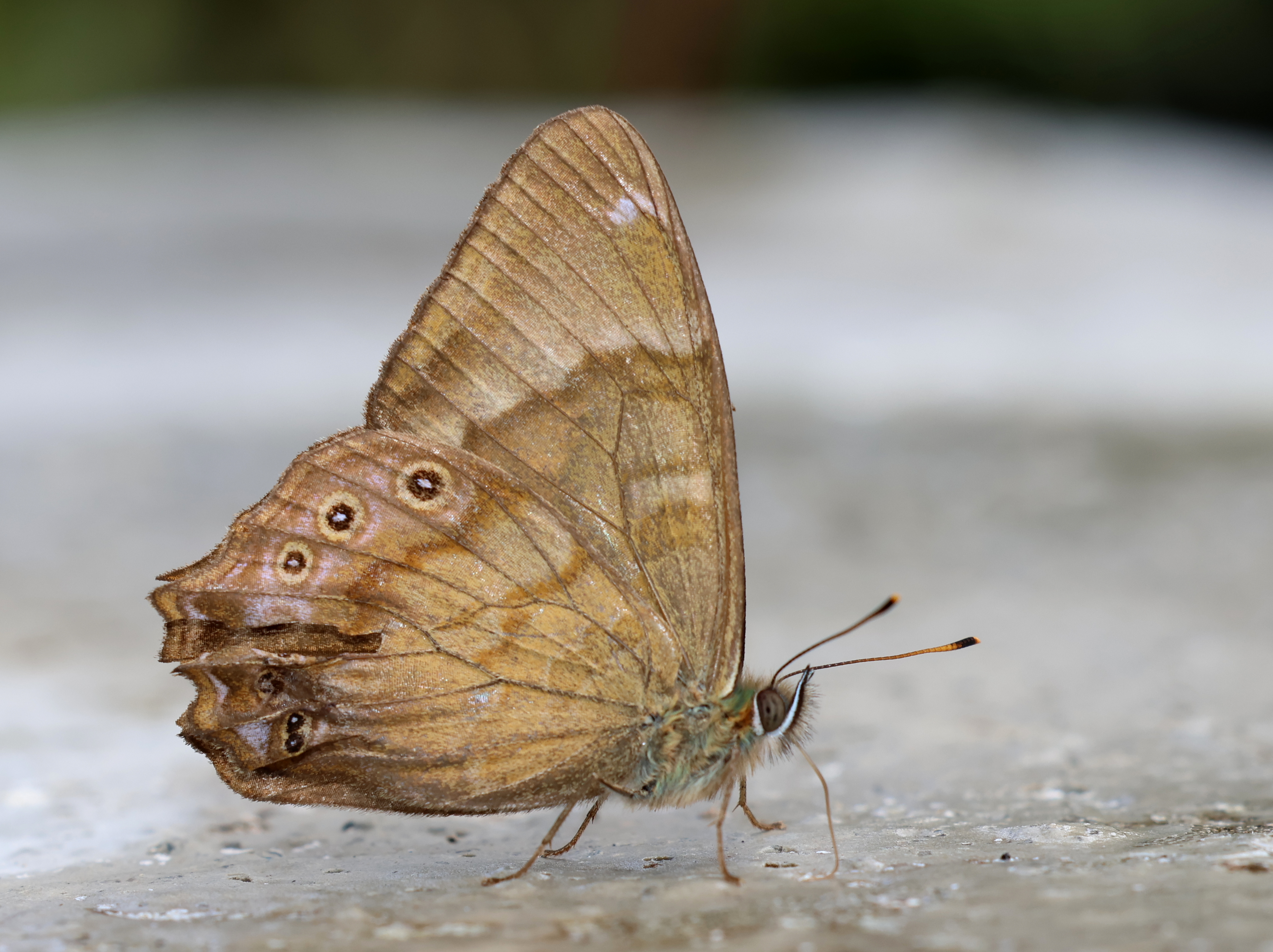

Scientific classification
- Kingdom: Animalia
- Phylum: Arthropoda
- Clade: Pancrustacea
- Class: Insecta
- Order: Lepidoptera
- Family: Nymphalidae
- Genus: Lethe
- Species: L. wui

Binomial name
- Lethe wui Huang, 1999

Synonyms
- Zophoessa wui

= Lethe wui =

Species of butterfly

Lethe wui, the Tibetan silverfork, golden mystic or Huang's mystic, is a butterfly in the family Nymphalidae. It is found in Metok in Tibet and Arunachal Pradesh in India. It was described by Hao Huang in 1999.

This species was described from one male collected in Metok, southeastern Tibet. Since then, this species has been sighted in Kachin, Myanmar in 2011 and Mayodia Pass, India in 2025.
