= Pai, Tibet =

Pai, Tibet 派镇
- Town
- Interactive map of Pai, Tibet
- Location of the seat in the Tibet Autonomous Region
- Coordinates: 29.5070°N 94.8502°E
- Country: People's Republic of China
- Autonomous region: Tibet
- Prefecture-level city: Nyingchi
- County: Mainling County

Area
  - Total: 1,800 km^{2} (690 sq mi)
- Elevation: 2,930 m (9,610 ft)

Population (2000)
  - Total: 1,771
  - Density: 0.98/km^{2} (2.5/sq mi)
- Time zone: UTC+8 (China Standard)

Pai (also spelt Pé and Pei; Tibetan: ཕད, Wylie: phad; Chinese: 派镇) is a town in Mainling County, Nyingchi Prefecture of Tibet Autonomous Region, China. The seat of the township is actually at the village Doxong (Tibetan: རྟོ་གཞོང, Wylie: rto gzhong). The original Pai village, called "Pai Chongdoi" (Tibetan: ཕད་གྲོང་རྡལ, Wylie: phad grong rdal) is a few hundred meters to the east. Both the villages are on the bank of Yarlung Tsangpo river, at the foothills of the "Doxong-la mountain" in the Namcha Barwa mountain range, . The river bends around the mountain range, eastern-most part of the Himalayas, where it is called the "Great Bend" or the Yarlung Tsangpo Grand Canyon. The Pai town near the entrance to the Great Bend.

The population the Pai Town in 2000 was 1,771.

The Kanas-Dongxing Highway, part of G219, passes through the Pai town and goes to Mêdog. This section of the highway, called "Pai-Mo Highway" (or Pai-Medog Highway), was completed in 2021 after a seven year construction. The road ascends part of the Doxongla mountain and runs in a 2,114 metre tunnel through the mountain.

In 2025, the Medog Hydropower Station project was begun. This project also involves tunnels through the mountain towards Medog Town. A small dam is also expected to be constructed in Pai Town for the regulation of water. Part of the township faces the risk of submergence.

== See also ==
- List of towns and villages in Tibet
