= Medog =

Medog (in Tibetan) or Motuo (in Chinese) may refer to:

- Mêdog County, a county in Tibet
  - Mêdog Town, the seat of Medog County
