= Beibeng Township =

Beibeng Township 背崩乡 Drepung-xiang, Baibung-xiang, Beibeng-xiang
- Township
- Interactive map of Beibeng Township
- Location within Tibet
- Coordinates: 29.24506°N 95.17458°E
- Country: China
- Autonomous region: Tibet
- Prefecture-level city: Nyingchi
- County: Medog County

Population (2007)
  - Total: 2,000+
- Time zone: UTC+8
- Administrative division code: 542624206

Beibeng or Baibung (Chinese: 背崩乡; pinyin: bēibēng xiāng), originally Drepung (Tibetan: འབྲས་སྤུངས་ཤང, Wylie: bras spungs shang, THL: dré pung shang), is a township in Medog County, Nyingchi Prefecture in the Tibet region of China. It is located 29 kilometers southwest of the county headquarters, adjacent to the border with India, and is one of the frontiers of China's border defense. In 2007, there were 329 agricultural households with 2042 people, mainly of Monpa ethnicity.

== Geography ==
The Beibeng village is on the course of the Yarlung Tsangpo river (called Brahmaputra in India) at the bottom of its Grand Canyon (also called the "Great Bend").

It is located in a subtropical climate zone, which is completely different from the Qinghai-Tibet Plateau. There are many local tourist attractions, such as the Sarong Lake Scenic Reserve and the Khan Mi Cascade Waterfall.

== Township ==
The township has jurisdiction over 9 administrative villages: Beibeng Village (背崩村), A Cang Village (阿苍村), Badeng Village (巴登村), Bodong Village (波东村), Xirang Village (西让村), Didong Village (地东村), Gelin Village (格林村), Dergong Village (德尔贡村), and Jiangxin Village (江新村).

== History ==
Beibeng Township is a strategic point in China's frontier defense. In 1962, it was a battlefield of the Sino-Indian War during which People's Liberation Army captured territory south of the Brahmaputra and other areas controlled by India, but subsequently withdrew. India regained control of the land south of the McMahon Line in 1963. Today, the Sino-Indian Line of Actual Control is located in the west, one kilometer south of Barra Hill.

== Climate ==
Beibeng township has a monsoonal humid subtropical climate (Cwa) with warm and relatively dry winters and hot, very rainy summers. It is one of China's most humid Administrative divisions.

Climate data for Beibengxiang
Month	Jan	Feb	Mar	Apr	May	Jun	Jul	Aug	Sep	Oct	Nov	Dec	Year
Mean daily maximum °C (°F)	19.7 (67.5)	20.4 (68.7)	22.1 (71.8)	23.7 (74.7)	26.4 (79.5)	27.4 (81.3)	26.8 (80.2)	28.2 (82.8)	27.2 (81.0)	26.2 (79.2)	24.3 (75.7)	20.9 (69.6)	24.4 (76.0)
Daily mean °C (°F)	14.5 (58.1)	15.7 (60.3)	17.9 (64.2)	19.7 (67.5)	22.4 (72.3)	23.8 (74.8)	23.6 (74.5)	24.5 (76.1)	23.6 (74.5)	21.9 (71.4)	19.0 (66.2)	15.6 (60.1)	20.2 (68.3)
Mean daily minimum °C (°F)	9.3 (48.7)	11.1 (52.0)	13.6 (56.5)	15.8 (60.4)	18.3 (64.9)	20.2 (68.4)	20.5 (68.9)	20.9 (69.6)	19.9 (67.8)	17.7 (63.9)	13.7 (56.7)	10.3 (50.5)	15.9 (60.7)
Average rainfall mm (inches)	42.3 (1.67)	91.0 (3.58)	192.7 (7.59)	277.9 (10.94)	383.0 (15.08)	524.1 (20.63)	520.6 (20.50)	347.8 (13.69)	380.0 (14.96)	214.9 (8.46)	51.7 (2.04)	31.6 (1.24)	3,057.6 (120.38)
