= Namcha Barwa Himal =

Mountain range in India and China

- Namjagbarwa
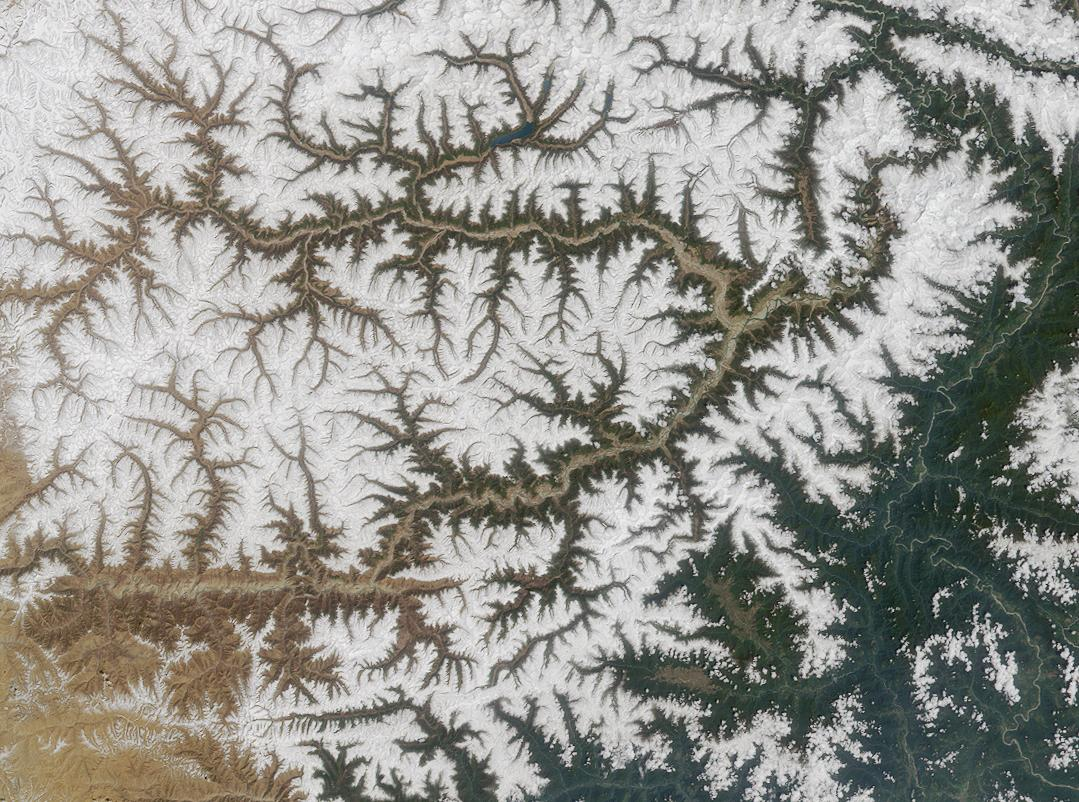
- Satellite view of Namcha Barwa Himal range surrounded by Great Bend of the Yarlung Tsangpo River (Brahmaputra River). Namcha Barwa Himal range runs diagonally from bottom left to top right corner, and Naamcha Barwa peak is in the top right at the end of the range. Gyala Peri peak in the Nyenchen Tanglha Shan range is just 20 km north of Naamcha Barwa peak across the Yarlung Tsangpo River.

Dimensions
- Length: 180 km (110 mi)
- Width: 60 km (37 mi)

Geography
- Location: Mêdog County, Nyingchi Prefecture, China

Namcha Barwa Himal, also known as Namjagbarwa syntaxis or Namjagbarwa Group Complex, is the easternmost section of the Himalaya in southeastern Tibet and northeastern India. This section spans 180 km from the headwaters of the Siyom River on the international border NE into Tibet to the canyon of the Yarlung Tsangpo (the Brahmaputra in India), where the Himalaya are said to end, although high ranges (Hengduan Mountains on China–Myanmar border) actually continue another 300 km east.

Major peaks of this section include:

- Namche Barwa, 7,782 m at 29°37′45″N 95°03′21″E, considered easternmost syntaxis of Himalaya
- Nai Peng, 7,043 m at 29°37′12″N 95°03′00″E, first climbed 1984
- Sentang Bu, 6,812 m at 29°49′48″N 95°00′36″E, unclimbed
- Gyala Peri, 7,294 m at 29°48′51″N 94°58′06″E, part of Nyenchen Tanglha Shan range, stands about 22 km NNW of Namche Barwa, across the Yarlung Tsangpo but often included in the Namche Barwa Himal range because of proximity.

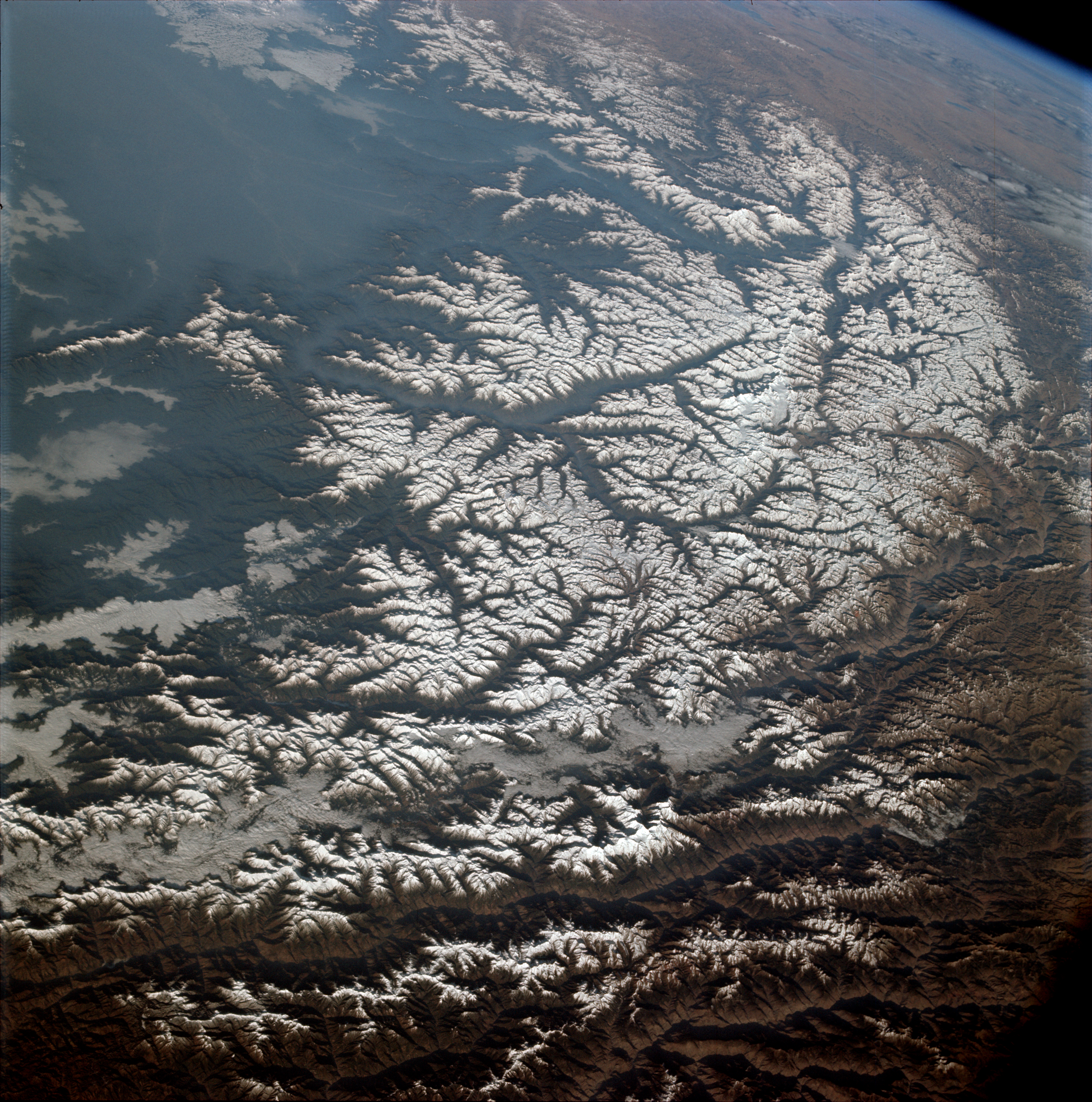
The Namcha Barwa Himal range photographed from Apollo 9 (1969).

== See also ==
- Geology of the Himalayas
