= Angsi Glacier =

Glacier in Tibet

Angsi
- Nangser
- Location within Tibet
- Interactive map of Angsi
- Type: Valley glacier
- Location: Tibet
- Coordinates: 30°20′53″N 82°02′41″E
- Lowest elevation: 5319.7

Angsi Glacier
- Simplified Chinese: 昂色冰川
Transcriptions

The Angsi Glacier or Nangser Glacier (Tibetan: ངང་སེར་འཁྱགས་རོམ, Wylie: ngang ser 'khyags rom, THL: ngang ser khyak rom) is a glacier located on the northern side of the Himalayas in the Purang County in China's Tibet Autonomous Region. It is immediately to the east of the Indus-Tsangpo water divide at the eastern edge of the Purang County. One of the headwaters of the Tsangpo River (Brahmaputra), called Angsi Chu or Nangser Chu, originates in this glacier. Angsi Chu merges with the Chema-yungdung Chu (Note: The Tibetan name is Tibetan: རྒྱས་མ་ཡངས་འཛོམས, Wylie: gyé ma yang dzom, ZWPY: Gyaimayangzom.) within a short distance (30.4038°N 82.277°E), and the combined river is called Chema-yungdung Chu.

Swami Pranavananda, an Indian ascetic and pilgrim, noted in 1939 that the Tibetan traditions regard the Chema-yungdung glacier as the source of Brahmaputra. He also noted that Kubi Chu, another source stream of Brahmaputra favoured by Sven Hedin, is larger, and that the Angsi Chu gives greater length.

As another complication, Angsi Chu merges with another stream called Dangkar Chu flowing from the Tumulung Lake (Tibetan: ཏུང་ལུང་མཚོ, Wylie: tung lung mtsho) before its confluence with Chema-yundung Chu (30.4246°N 82.1851°E). Pranavananda also noted that the Indian Bhotiya merchants call the Tumulung Lake as "Brahmakund" and regard it as the source of Brahmaputra. Water residues seen in satellite maps indicate that waters from the Ganglung Glacier, to the west of Angsi Glacier, once flowed into the Tumulung Lake, but now they flow west into Sutlej (30.4402°N 82.0052°E).

In 2011, Chinese scientists from the Chinese Academy of Sciences declared that the Angsi Glacier is the "true source" of the Tsangpo River and this determination has been accepted by the Indian observers. Encyclopedia Britannica continues to regard the Chema-yungdung Glacier as the source of Brahmaputra.

== Bibliography ==
- Pranavananda, Swami (1939), Exploration in Tibet, University of Calcutta – via archive.org
