= Gyala Peri =

Mountain in the Himalayas

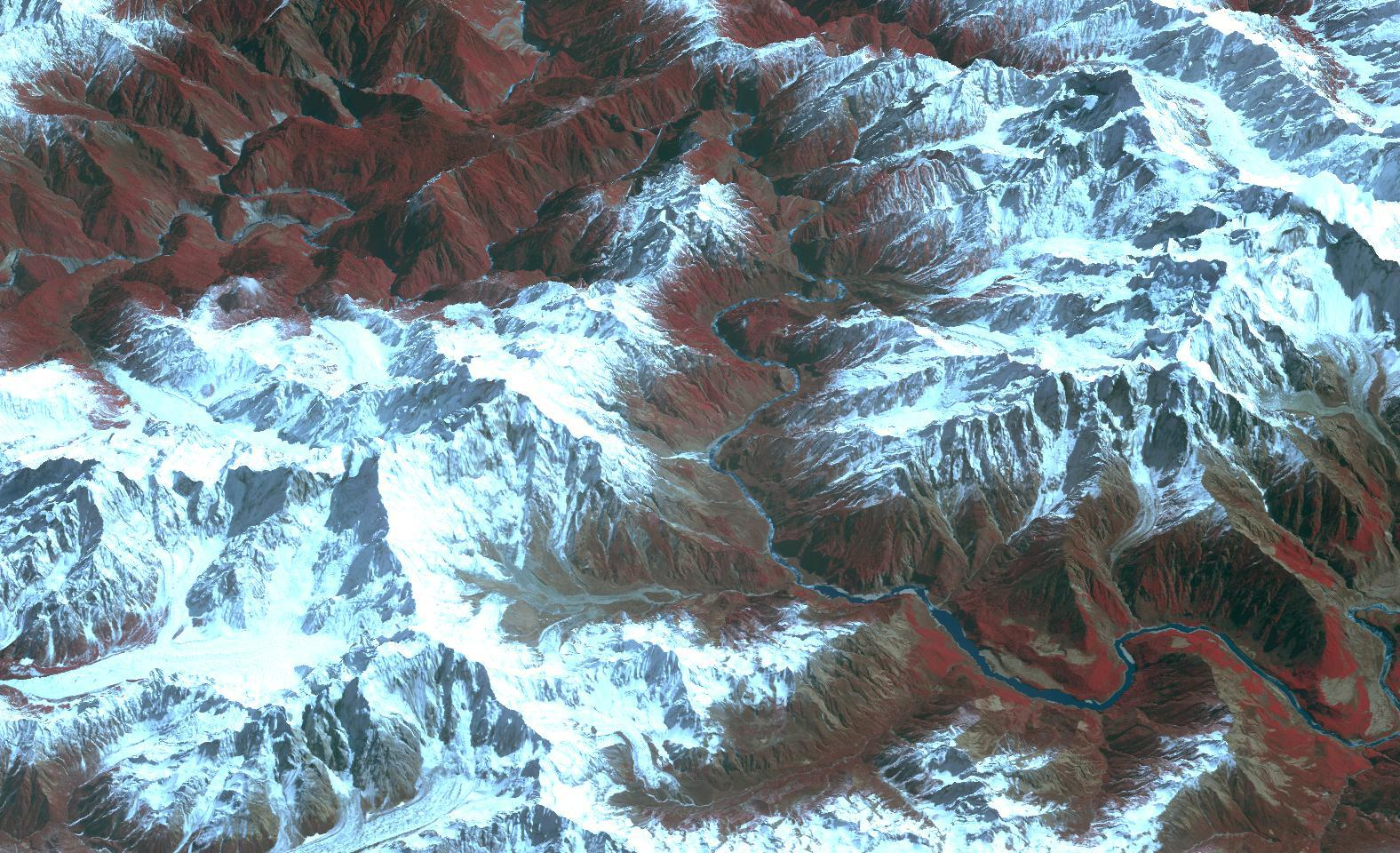
- Satellite view facing East: Gyala Peri (center) and Namcha Barwa (right), with the Yarlung Tsangpo river flowing between them. The immense south face rises 4,600 m from the banks of the river in a single sweep.

Highest point
- Elevation: 7,294 m (23,930 ft); Ranked 84th
- Prominence: 2,942 m (9,652 ft); Ranked 100th
- Listing: Ultra
- Coordinates: 29°48′51″N 94°58′06″E

Geography
- Location within China Location within Tibet
- Location: China; Tibet Autonomous Region; Nyingchi Prefecture; Mêdog County north of McMahon Line
- Parent range: Nyenchen Tanglha Shan

Climbing
- First ascent: October 31, 1986 by Y. Hashimoto, H. Imamura, Y. Ogata.
- Easiest route: rock/snow/ice climb

Gyala Peri (Chinese: 加拉白垒, Pinyin: Jiālābáilěi) is a 7,294-metre (23,930 ft) peak just beyond the eastern end of the Himalayas at the entrance to Tsangpo gorge. It is part of Nyenchen Tanglha Shan, although it is sometimes included in Namcha Barwa Himal of the Himalayas.

Gyala Peri lies just north of the Great Bend of the Yarlung Tsangpo River, the main river of southeastern Tibet, which becomes the Brahmaputra in India. It is 22 kilometres (14 mi) NNW of the higher Namcha Barwa.

== Notable features ==
Gyala Peri has great vertical relief above the Tsangpo gorge and is the highest peak of the Nyenchen Tanglha Shan.

== Climbing history ==
The first ascent of Gyala Peri was in 1986, by a Japanese expedition, via the South Ridge. The group spent about 1 1/2 months on the mountain. The U.K. Alpine Club's Himalayan Index lists no other ascents.

== See also ==
- Geology of the Himalaya
- List of ultras of Tibet, East Asia and neighbouring areas

== Other sources ==
- Neate, Jill (1989). High Asia: An Illustrated History of the 7000 Metre Peaks. Seattle: The Mountaineers. ISBN 0-89886-238-8.
- Namcha Barwa, NH 46-12 (Map). 1:250,000. U.S. Army Map Service. 1955.
- "Gyala Peri, China". Peakbagger.com.
