= Gedang Township =

Gedang 格当乡
- Township
- Location within Tibet
- Coordinates: 29.44274°N 95.66866°E
- Country: China
- Region: Tibet
- Prefecture: Nyingchi
- County: Medog County
- Elevation: 2,000 m (6,600 ft)

Population (2017)
  - Total: 1,300+
  - Major Nationalities: Tibetan
  - Regional dialect: Tibetan language

Gedang or Gutang (Chinese: 格当乡 Tibetan: དགུ་ཐང་) is a township in Medog County, Nyingchi Prefecture in the Tibet region of China.

It is located near India. In 2007, there were 106 agricultural households with 588 people, mainly Tibetans.
