= Bangxing =

- Township

Tibetan transcription(s)
  - Tibetan: སྤང་ཤིང་
  - Wylie transliteration: spangshing

Chinese transcription(s)
  - Simplified: 旁辛乡
  - Pinyin: Bāngxīng
- Location within Tibet
- Coordinates: 29°37′N 95°25′E
- Country: China
- Region: Tibet Autonomous Region
- Prefecture: Nyingchi Prefecture
- County: Medog County

Population (2007)
  - Total: 1,351
- Time zone: UTC+8 (CST)

Bangxing (Tibetan: སྤང་ཤིང་;Chinese: 旁辛; pinyin: Bàngxīn) is a township in Medog County, Tibet Autonomous Region of the People's Republic of China. It lies at an altitude of 2,161 metres (7,090 ft). Its population in 2007 was 1,351, the town is located in the traditional province of Pemako, most of the inhabitants are Tshangla speakers.

== See also ==
- List of towns and villages in Tibet Autonomous Region

== External links and references ==
- NCIKU Comprehensive Chinese-English Dictionary
