= Pemako Tshangla dialect =

Dialect of the Tshangla language

Pemako Tshangla
- པདྨ་བཀོད་ཚངས་ལ་སྐད
- Pronunciation: [tsʰaŋla]
- Region: Pemako region, Tibet; Arunachal Pradesh, India
- Native speakers: 10,000-15,000 (2012)
- Language family: Sino-Tibetan: Tibeto-Burman?; Tibeto-Kanauri?; Kalaktang Monpa–Tshangla; Tshangla; Pemako Tshangla
- Writing system: Tibetan alphabet

Language codes
- ISO 639-3: –
- Glottolog: None

The Pemakö dialect (Tibetan: པདྨ་བཀོད་ཚངས་ལ་སྐད་, Wylie: pad ma bkod btsang la skad , also Padma bkod skad) is a dialect of the Tshangla language. It is the predominant speech in the Pemako region of the Tibet Autonomous Region and an adjoining contiguous area south of the McMahon line in Arunachal Pradesh in India. Though Tshangla is not a Tibetic language, it shares many similarities with Classical Tibetan, particularly in its vocabulary. Many Tibetan loanwords are used in Pemako, due to centuries of close contact with various Tibetan tribes in the Pemako area. Pemako Tshangla has undergone tremendous changes due to its isolation and Tibetan influence.

== Phonology ==
Below appears a table of Tshangla consonants according to Andvik (2010). Non-native phonemes, in parentheses, are contrasted only marginally with native sounds: /ɬ/ is often nativized to /l/; /dz/ becomes /z/; and /ʑ/ becomes /y/.

Tshangla consonants
		Labial	Alveolar	Retroflex	Palatal	Velar	Glottal
Approximant		w /w/ ཝ			j /y/ ཡ		h /h/ ཧ
Nasal		m /m/ མ	n /n/ ན		ɲ /ny/ ཉ	ŋ /ng/ ང	
Plosive	voiceless	p /p/ པ	t /t/ ཏ	ʈ /tr/ ཏྲ		k /k/ ཀ	
Plosive	aspirated	pʰ /ph/ ཕ	tʰ /th/ ཐ	ʈʰ /thr/ ཐྲ		kʰ /kh/ ཁ	
Plosive	voiced	b /b/ བ	d /d/ ད	ɖ /dr/ དྲ		ɡ /g/ ག	
Affricate	voiceless		ts /ts/ ཅ		tɕ /tsh/ ཆ		
Affricate	voiced		(dz /dz/ ཛ)		dʑ /j/ ཇ		
Fricative	voiceless		s /s/ ས		ɕ /sh/ ཤ		
Fricative	voiced		z /z/ ཟ		(ʑ /zh/ ཞ)		
Lateral	voiceless		(ɬ /lh/ ལྷ)				
Lateral	voiced		l /l/ ལ				
Flap			r /r/ ར				

The above table generally describes onset consonants. Consonant clusters in the onset position are limited to consonant plus /r/, with the exception of the syllable /pɕi/, used on only two contexts. (Note: The cluster /pɕi/ is used only in the words for "four" (/pɕi/) and "to fart" (/pɕi pʰule/).) Intervocalic positioning of aspirated onsets /pʰ/ /tʰ/, and /kʰ/ results in lenition to /ɸ/, /θ/, and /x/ or /h/, respectively, with some exceptions. Syllable-final consonants are limited to /p/, /t/, /k/, /s/, /m/, /n/, and /ŋ/.

Tshangla vowels appear in the chart below, following Andvik (2010). Vowels in parentheses appear in non-native words inherited from Tibetan, Dzongkha, and the latter's archaic liturgical form, Chöke. Non-native front rounded vowels may be nativized as front unrounded vowels.

Tshangla vowels
	Front		Central	Back
	Unrounded	Rounded		Rounded
Close	i /i/ ི	(y /ü/ ུ)		u /u/ ུ
Mid	e /e/ ེ	(œ /ö/ ོ)		o /o/ ོ
Open			a /a/	

Tshangla personal pronouns
	Singular	Dual	Plural
1p	jang	a-ching	ai
2p	nang	na-ching	na
3p	ro	da-ching	rokte

== Formation ==
Ever since Pemako was first opened to outside world thousands of people from different walks of life settled in the region, among them, earliest were the Tshangla people from Eastern Bhutan who fled their homeland and took refuge there. Among the first clans of Tshangla people were the Ngatsangpas (Snga Tsang pa) who paved ways for others to join them in their plight for a promised land free from sufferings. The exodus of Tshangla community continued from the beginning of the 17th century until the early 20th century. Political and religious turmoil in Tibet forced many Tibetans to join Tshangla people in Pemako a land where religious serenity pledge through many revered Lamas who had been to this land, prophesied by Guru Rinpoche in the mid 8th century to be a land of final call where devotees would be flocking at the time of Religious persecutions, the last sanctuary for Buddhism, with the time Pemako's popularity grew more and more, with the popularity many Tibetan people particularly from Kham followed their lamas and settled alongside Tshangla populace. Over the period of time Tibetans and Tshangla migrants amalgamated to form an homogeneous group called Pemako pas ( Pad-ma dkod pa). The process of infusion gave birth to a new Tshangla dialect called Pemako dialect. People who reside in Pemako enclave are of mixed blood originated from early Tshangla settlers and different Tibetan tribes, Standard Tibetan is also spoken in Pemako, with many different languages such Khampa language, Kongpo dialect, Poba Language etc.

== Number of speakers ==
There are approximately 10,000 Tshangla speaker in Upper Pemako, Tibet, 4000–5000 in Lower Pemako, in Arunachal Pradesh and approximately 3500–4000 Tibetan Tshangla community residing in three different Tibetan settlements, Tezu, Miao in Arunachal Pradesh and Orissa. Many Pemakos in the past have spread to western countries as well.
