= Mêdog Town =

Mêdog 墨脱镇 • མེ་ཏོག
- Town
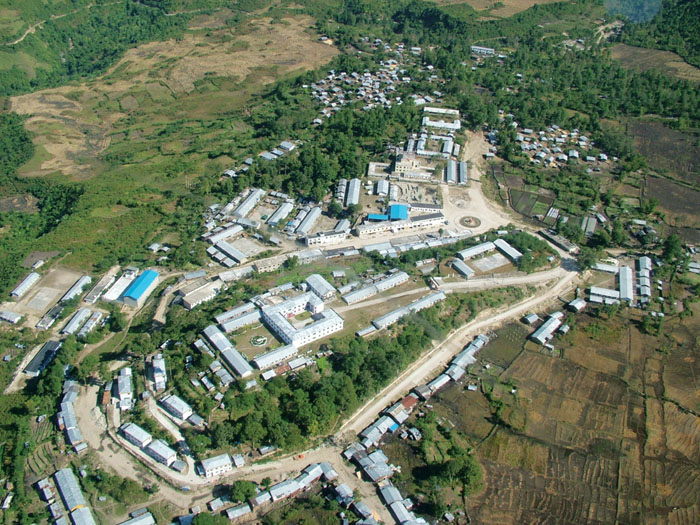

- Location in Tibet
- Coordinates: 29°29′N 95°30′E
- Country: People's Republic of China
- Region: Tibet
- Prefecture: Nyingchi Prefecture
- County seat: Mêdog

Area
  - Total: 34,000 km^{2} (13,000 sq mi)
- Elevation: 1,500–3,500 m (4,900–11,500 ft)

Population (2010 Census)
  - Total: 10,963
- Time zone: UTC+8 (China Standard)

Mêdog, Metok, or Motuo (Tibetan: མེ་ཏོག,, Wylie: Metog; simplified Chinese: 墨脱镇; traditional Chinese: 墨脫鎮; pinyin: Mòtuō Zhèn) is a town in the Tibet Autonomous Region of China. Metok town is the seat of Mêdog County, within the administration of Nyingchi Prefecture. Formally called Metok Dzong, it used to be the residence of Dzongpon (district head) representing the authority of Tibetan Lhasa Govt (Ganden Phodrang). Metok town is located within the valley of the great bend of river Tsangpo (Brahmaputra). Its elevation is the lowest of all the counties of Tibet hence the town is abundant in vegetation and has rich flora and fauna. Metok is in the heart of Pema ko which connects the county with the rest of the country.

== Geography ==
Majority of Metok population is Pemakopas (a.k.a. Pemako Tshangla speakers), with significant minority of Khampas, Kongpopas and Lhopas (tribals).

Metok is in the heart of Pemakö, which connects the county with rest of the country. The majority of Metok population are Pemaköpas speaking Tshangla, with a significant minority of Khambas, Kongpopas and Lhobas.

== See also ==
- List of towns and villages in Tibet
