= Hao Huang =

Hao Huang may refer to:

- Hao Huang (pianist) (1957), American pianist and musicologist
- Hao Huang (mathematician), mathematician
- Hao Huang (entomologist), Chinese entomologist
