= Namcha Barwa =

Mountain in Tibet

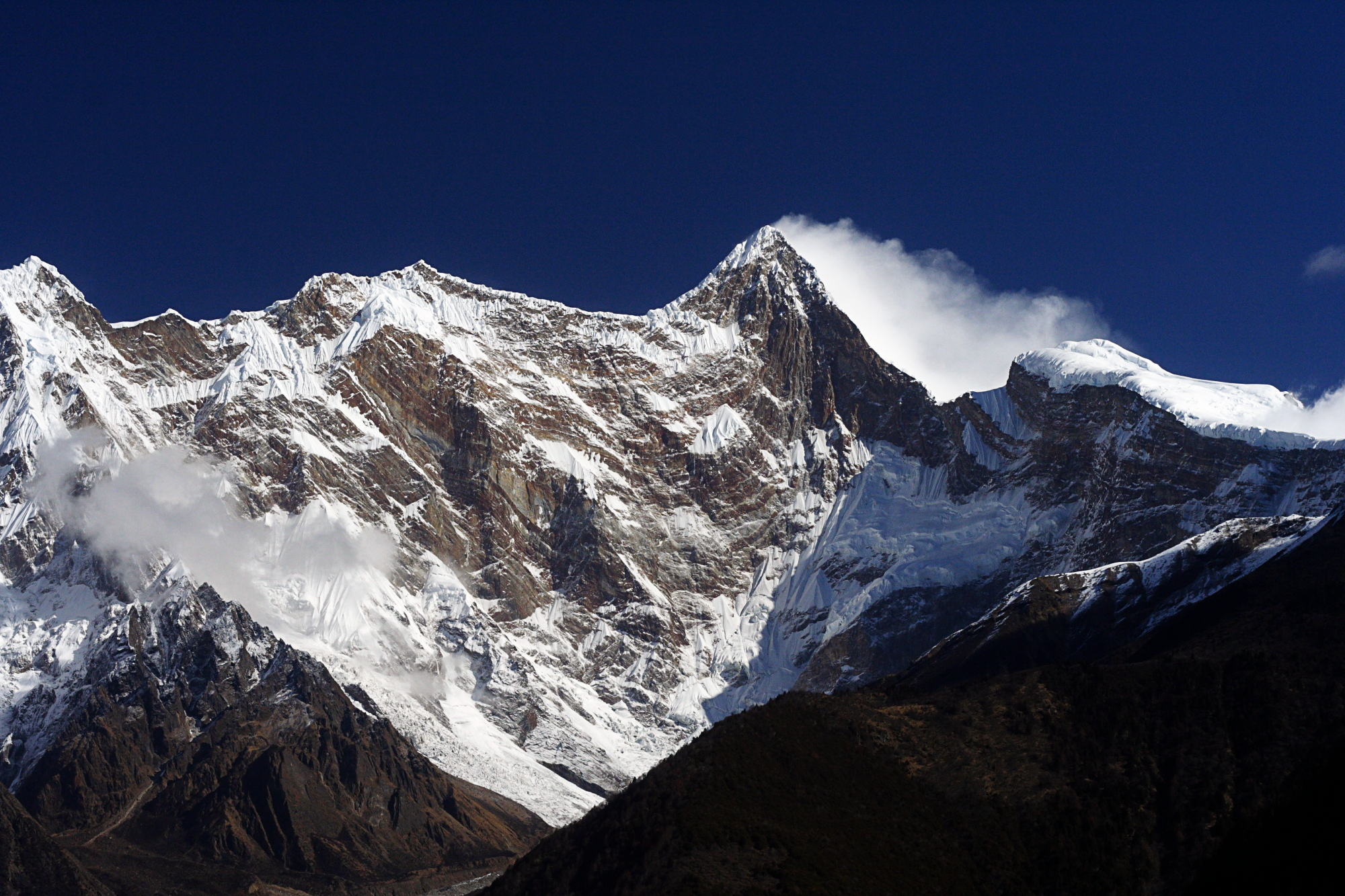
- Namcha Barwa from the west, from Zhibai observation platform

Highest point
- Elevation: 7,782 m (25,531 ft); Ranked 27th
- Prominence: 4,106 m (13,471 ft); Ranked 19th
- Listing: Ultra
- Coordinates: 29°37′45″N 95°03′21″E

Geography
- The major peaks (not mountains) above 7,500 m (24,600 ft) height in Himalayas, rank identified in Himalayas alone (not the world). Legend: 1：Mount Everest; 2：Kangchenjunga; 3：Lhotse; 4：Yalung Kang, Kanchenjunga West; 5：Makalu; 6：Kangchenjunga South; 7：Kangchenjunga Central; 8：Cho Oyu; 9：Dhaulagiri; 10：Manaslu (Kutang); 11：Nanga Parbat (Diamer); 12：Annapurna; 13：Shishapangma (Shishasbangma, Xixiabangma); 14：Manaslu East; 15：Annapurna East Peak; 16： Gyachung Kang; 17：Annapurna II; 18：Tenzing Peak (Ngojumba Kang, Ngozumpa Kang, Ngojumba Ri); 19：Kangbachen; 20：Himalchuli (Himal Chuli); 21：Ngadi Chuli (Peak 29, Dakura, Dakum, Dunapurna); 22：Nuptse (Nubtse); 23：Nanda Devi; 24：Chomo Lonzo (Chomolonzo, Chomolönzo, Chomo Lönzo, Jomolönzo, Lhamalangcho); 25：Namcha Barwa (Namchabarwa); 26：Zemu Kang (Zemu Gap Peak); 27：Kamet; 28：Dhaulagiri II; 29：Ngojumba Kang II; 30：Dhaulagiri III; 31：Kumbhakarna Mountain (Mount Kumbhakarna, Jannu); 32：Gurla Mandhata (Naimona'nyi, Namu Nan); 33：Hillary Peak (Ngojumba Kang III); 34：Molamenqing (Phola Gangchen); 35：Dhaulagiri IV; 36：Annapurna Fang; 37：Silver Crag; 38：Kangbachen Southwest; 39：Gangkhar Puensum (Gangkar Punsum); 40：Annapurna III; 41：Himalchuli West; 42：Annapurna IV; 43：Kula Kangri; 44：Liankang Kangri (Gangkhar Puensum North, Liangkang Kangri); 45：Ngadi Chuli South
- Country: China
- Region: Tibet Autonomous Region
- Division: Nyingchi
- County: Mainling and Mêdog
- Parent range: Namcha Barwa Himal

Climbing
- First ascent: 1992, China–Japan expedition
- Easiest route: SSW ridge on rock, snow and ice

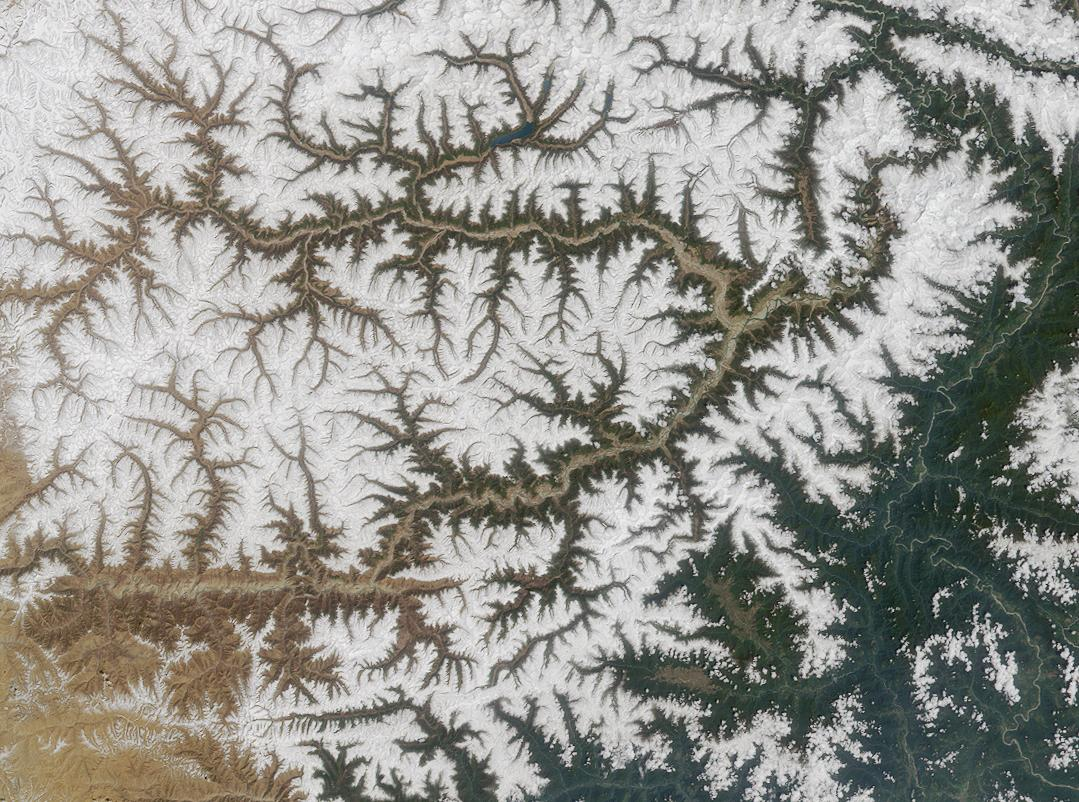
Namcha Barwa Himal range, runs 180 km diagonally from bottom left to top right corner, surrounded by the Yarlung Tsangpo River (Brahmaputra River). Naamcha Barwa peak is in the top right at the end of the range. Gyala Peri peak in the Nyenchen Tanglha Shan range is just 20 km northwest of Naamcha Barwa peak across the "Great Bend" of Yarlung Tsangpo River surrounding the Naamcha Barwa peak.

Namcha Barwa or Namchabarwa (Tibetan: གནམས་ལྕགས་འབར་བ།, Wylie: Gnams lcags 'bar ba, ZWPY: Namjagbarwa; Chinese: 南迦巴瓦峰, Pinyin: Nánjiābāwǎ Fēng) is a mountain peak lying in southeastern Tibet. The traditional definition of the Himalaya extending from the Indus River to the Brahmaputra would make it the eastern anchor of the entire mountain chain, and it is the highest peak of its own section as well as Earth's easternmost peak over 7,600 metres (24,900 ft). It lies in the Nyingchi Prefecture of Tibet. It is the highest peak in the 180 km long Namcha Barwa Himal range (also called the Namjagbarwa syntaxis or Namjagbarwa Group Complex), which is considered the easternmost syntaxis/section of the Himalaya in southeastern Tibet and northeastern India where the Himalaya are said to end, although high ranges (Hengduan Mountains on the China–Myanmar border) actually continue another 300 km to the east.

== Location ==
Namcha Barwa is in an isolated part of southeastern Tibet rarely visited by outsiders. It stands inside the Great Bend of the Yarlung Tsangpo River as the river enters its notable gorge across the Himalaya, emerging as the Siang and becoming the Brahmaputra. Namcha Barwa's sister peak Gyala Peri at 7,294 metres (23,930 ft) rises across the gorge 22 kilometres (14 mi) to the north-north-west (NNW).

== Notable features ==
Namcha rises 5,000–6,800 metres (16,400–22,300 ft) above the Yarlung Tsangpo. After 7,795-metre (25,574 ft) Batura Sar in the Karakoram was climbed in 1976, Namcha Barwa became the highest unclimbed independent mountain in the world, until it was finally climbed in 1992.

In addition to being the 27th highest mountain in the world, Namcha Barwa is the third most prominent peak in the Himalayas after Mount Everest and Nanga Parbat.

Frank Kingdon-Ward described in the 1920s "a quaint prophecy among the Kongbo Tibetans that Namche Barwa will one day fall into the Tsangpo gorge and block the river, which will then turn aside and flow over the Doshong La [pass]. This is recorded in a book by some fabulous person whose image may be seen in the little gompa [Buddhist monastery] at Payi, in Pome." (126–127) (See Beyul for the reason behind the prophecy and Padmasambhava or another Tertön for the "fabulous person whose image may be seen in the little gompa").

== Climbing history ==
Namcha Barwa was located in 1912 by British surveyors but the area remained virtually unvisited until Chinese alpinists began attempting the peak in the 1980s. Although they scouted multiple routes, they did not reach the summit. In 1990 a Chinese-Japanese expedition reconnoitered the peak. Another joint expedition reached 7,460 metres (24,480 ft) in 1991 but lost member Hiroshi Onishi in an avalanche. The next year a third Chinese-Japanese expedition established six camps on the South Ridge over intermediate Nai Peng (7,043 metres or 23,107 feet), reaching the summit on October 30. Eleven climbers reached the summit. U.K. Alpine Club's Himalayan Index lists no further ascents.

== See also ==
- Geology of the Himalaya
- Gyala Peri
- Yarlung Tsangpo Grand Canyon
- Nanga Parbat – western anchor of the Himalayas
- List of ultras of the Himalayas
