= Yarlung Tsangpo Grand Canyon =

Canyon in Tibet, China

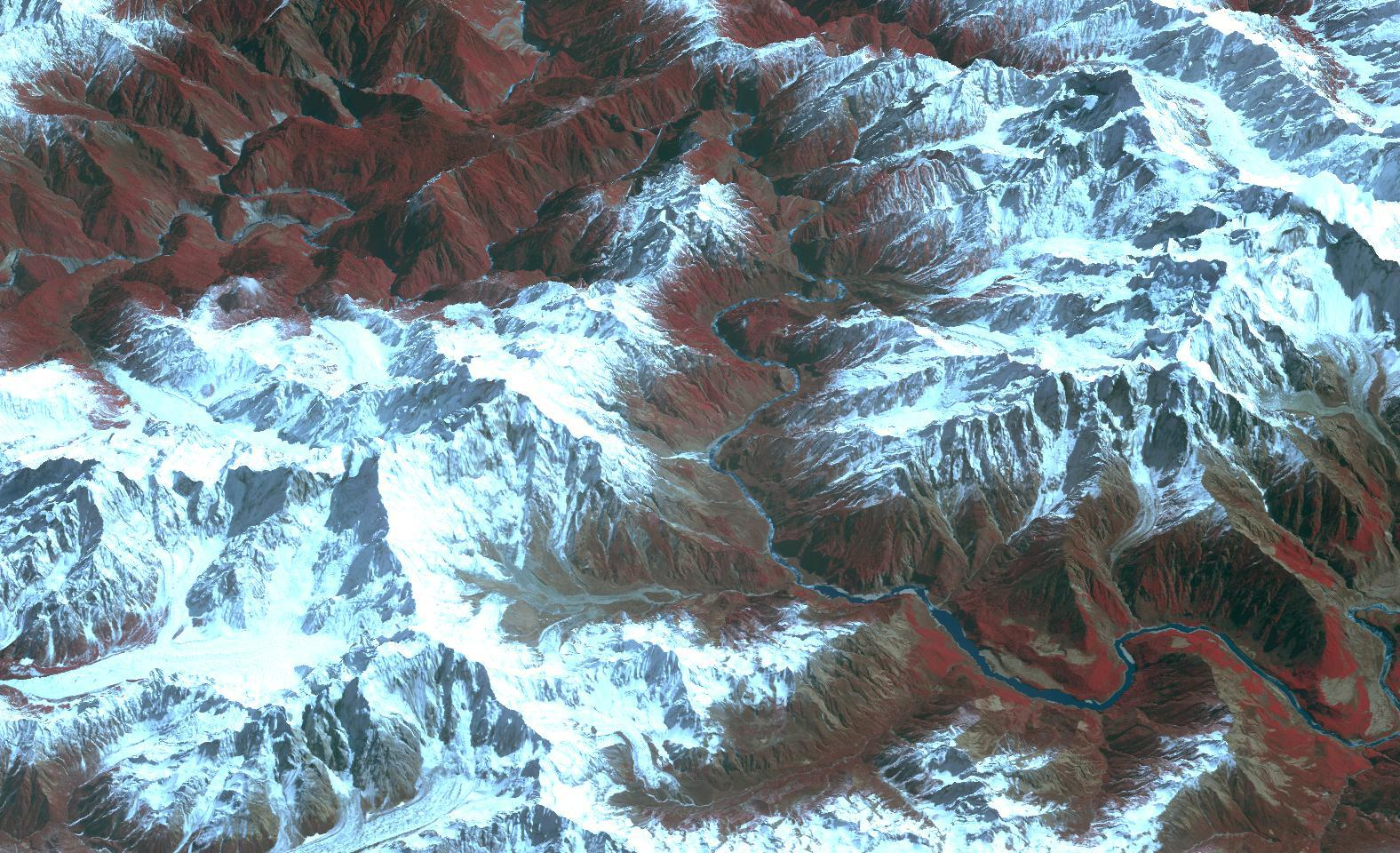
The Yarlung Tsangpo Grand Canyon is one of the deepest canyons on land and longer than the Grand Canyon.

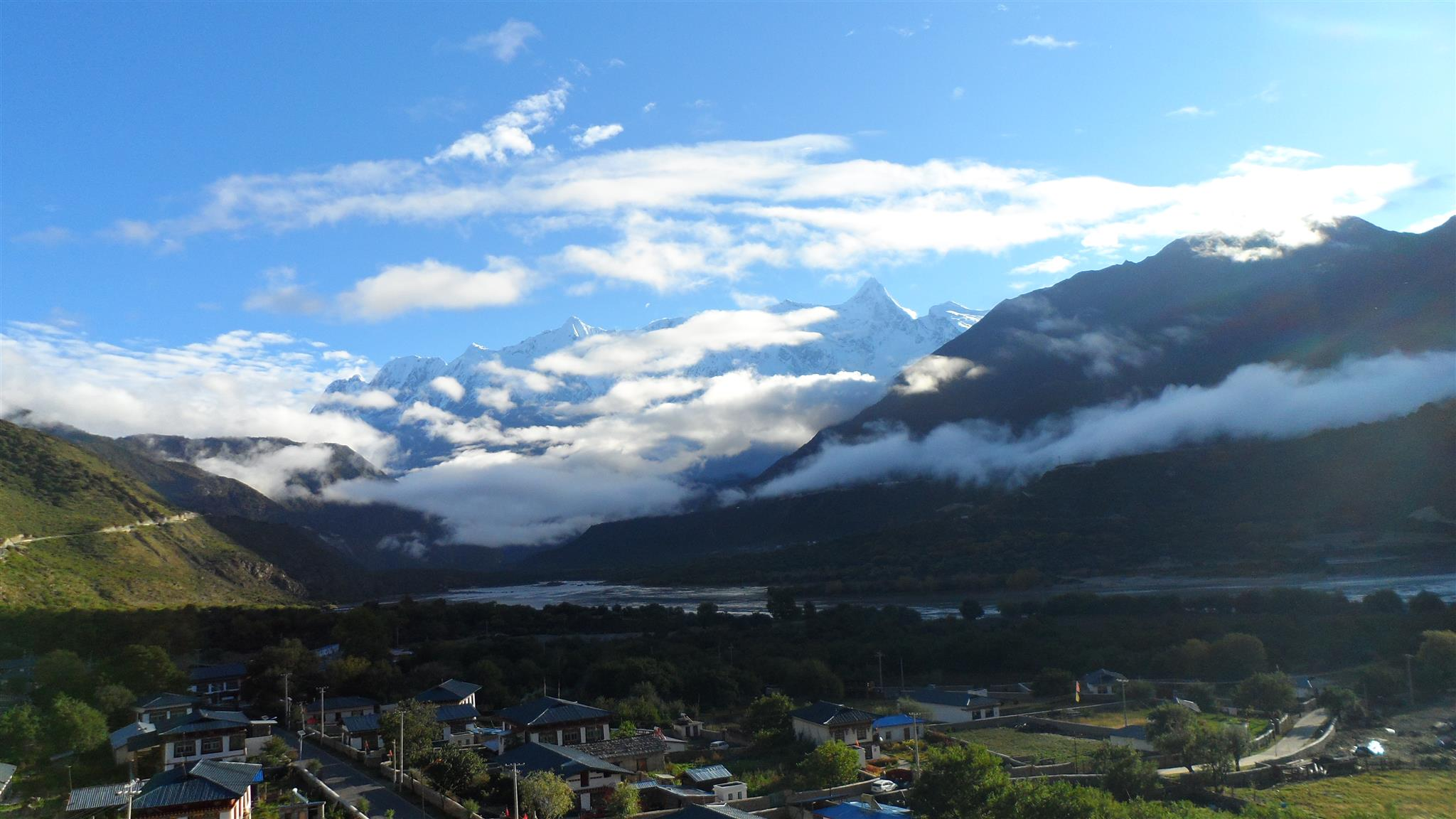
Mount Namcha Barwa seen from the entrance of the canyon

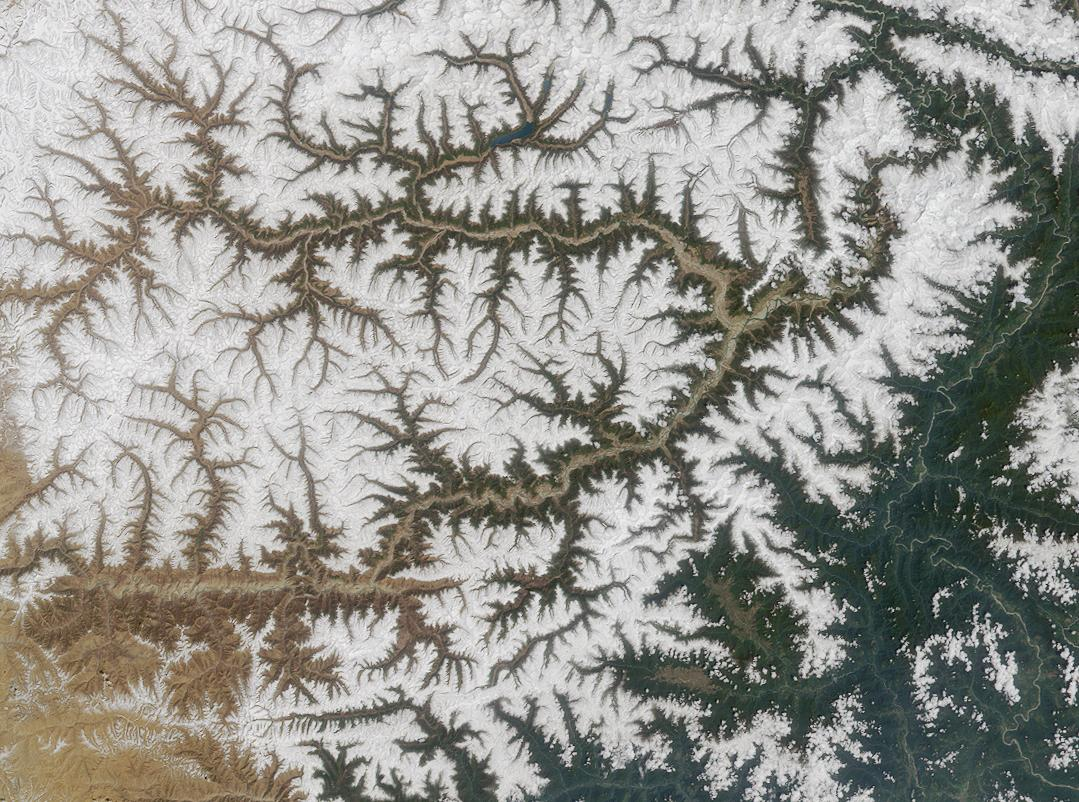
Yarlung Tsangpo River as it courses through Tibet, with peaks Namche Barwa and Gyala Peri. The picture is centered on 29.156°N 93.983°E

The Yarlung Tsangpo Grand Canyon, also known as the Yarlung Zangbo Grand Canyon, the Tsangpo Canyon, the Brahmaputra Canyon or the Tsangpo Gorge (simplified Chinese: 雅鲁藏布大峡谷; traditional Chinese: 雅魯藏布大峽谷; pinyin: Yǎlǔzàngbù Dàxiágǔ), is a canyon along the Yarlung Tsangpo River in Tibet Autonomous Region, China. It is the deepest canyon in the world, (Note: There are deeper trenches under water in the ocean. The Mariana Trench is 10,920 metres deep.) and at 504.6 kilometres (313.5 mi) is slightly longer than the Grand Canyon in the United States, making it one of the world's largest. The Yarlung Tsangpo (Tibetan name for the upper course of the Brahmaputra) originates near Mount Kailash and runs east for about 1,700 kilometres (1,100 mi), draining a northern section of the Himalayas before it enters the gorge just downstream of Pei, Tibet, near the settlement of Zhibe. The canyon has a length of about 240 kilometres (150 mi) as the gorge bends around Mount Namcha Barwa (7,782 metres or 25,531 feet) and cuts its way through the eastern Himalayas. Its waters drop from about 2,900 metres (9,500 ft) near Pei to about 1,500 metres (4,900 ft) at the end of the Upper Gorge where the Po Tsangpo River enters. The river continues through the Lower Gorge to the Indian border at an elevation of 660 metres (2,170 ft). The river then enters Arunachal Pradesh and eventually becomes the Brahmaputra.

== Canyon depth ==
As the canyon passes between the peaks of the Namcha Barwa (Namjabarwa) and Gyala Peri mountains, it reaches an average depth of about 5,000 m (16,000 feet) around Namcha Barwa. The canyon's average depth overall is about 2,268 m (7,440 feet), the deepest depth reaches 6,009 m (19,714 feet). This is the greatest canyon depth on land. This part of the canyon is at 29.769742°N 94.989853°E. Namcha Barwa, 7,782 m (25,531 feet) high, is at 29°37′33″N 95°03′26″E, and Gyala Peri, at 7,234 m (23,733 feet), is at 29°48′48″N 94°58′02″E.

== Ecosystem ==
The gorge has a unique ecosystem with species of animals and plants barely explored and affected by human influence. Its climate ranges from subtropical to Arctic, and it has several different vegetation zones: Lowland tropical forests, including the tropical rainforest and seasonal tropical forests; tropical montane and subtropical broad-leaved forest; subalpine temperate coniferous forest; subalpine cool coniferous forest; alpine shrubland and tundra. The highest temperature in Tibet is 43.6 °C (110.5 °F) and is recorded near the border of India at about 600 metres (2,000 ft) above sea level. The rare takin is one of the animals hunted by the local tribes.

The canyon is home of a South Tibetan cypress (Cupressus austrotibetica) that is 102.3 metres (336 ft) tall and, upon its discovery in 2023, is believed to be the tallest tree in Asia.

== The Everest of Rivers ==
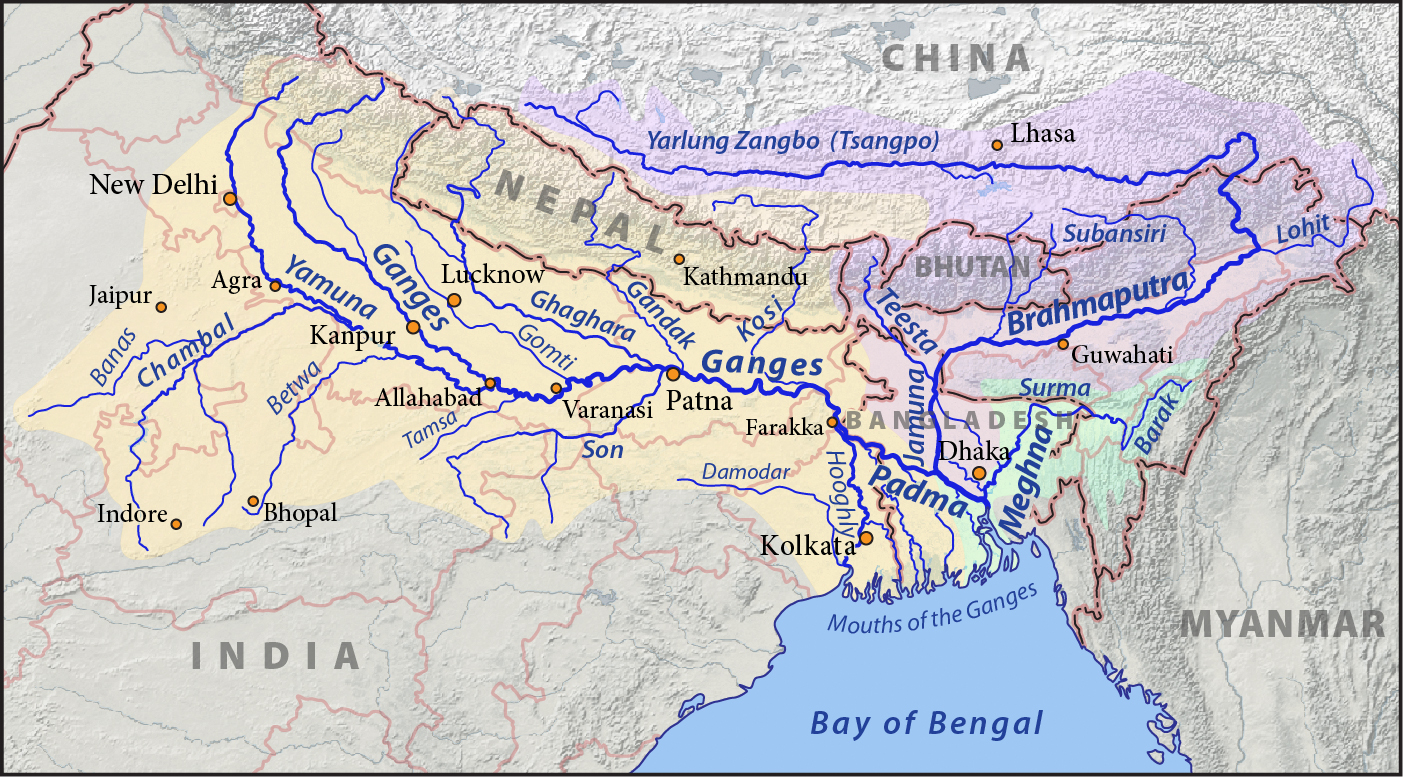
The Yarlung Tsangpo Canyon is located at the great bend of the river before entering the Indian State of Arunachal Pradesh

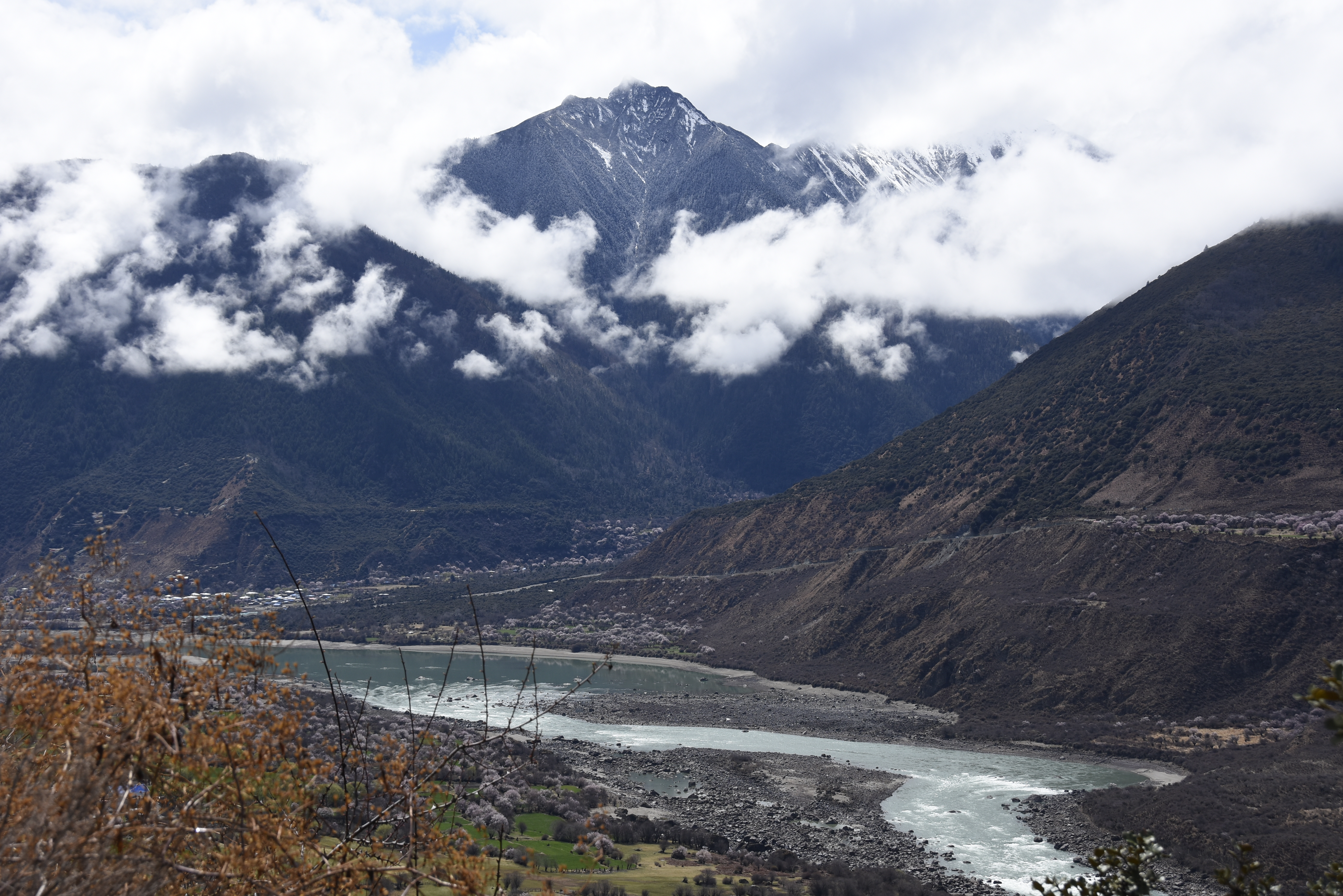
Yarlung Tsangpo River near Namcha Barwa

Western interest in the Tsangpo began in the 19th century when British explorers and geographers speculated where Tibet's east-flowing Tsangpo ended up, suspecting the Brahmaputra. Since British citizens were not allowed to enter Tibet they recruited Indian "pundits" to do the footwork. Kinthup from Sikkim entered the gorge near Gyala, but it proved to be impenetrable. In 1880 Kinthup was sent back to test the Brahmaputra theory by releasing 500 specially marked logs into the river at a prearranged time. His British boss Captain Henry Harman posted men on the Dihang-Brahmaputra to watch for their arrival. However, Kinthup was sold into slavery, escaped, and ended up employed at a monastery. On three leaves of absence he managed to craft the logs, send a letter from Lhasa with his new intended schedule, and send off the logs. Four years had passed. Unfortunately his note to alert the British got misdirected, his boss had left India, and nobody checked for the appearance of the logs.

In 1913, Frederick Marshman Bailey and Henry Morshead launched an expedition into the gorge that finally confirmed that the Tsangpo was indeed the upper Brahmaputra. Frank Kingdon-Ward started an expedition in 1924 in hopes of finding a major waterfall explaining the difference in altitude between the Tsangpo and the Brahmaputra. It turned out that the gorge has a series of relatively steep sections. Among them was a waterfall he named "Rainbow Falls", not as big as he had hoped.

The area was closed after China invaded Tibet and disputed the location of the border in the Sino-Indian War. The Chinese government resumed issuing permits in the 1990s. Since then the gorge has also been visited by kayakers. It has been called the "Everest of Rivers" because of the extreme conditions. The first attempt was made in 1993 by a Japanese group who lost one member on the river. In October 1998 an expedition sponsored by the National Geographic Society attempted to kayak the entire gorge. Troubled by unanticipated high water levels, it ended in tragedy when Doug Gordon was lost. In January–February 2002 an international group with Scott Lindgren, Steve Fisher, Mike Abbott, Allan Ellard, Dustin Knapp, and Johnnie and Willie Kern completed the first full descent of the upper Tsangpo gorge section.

The largest waterfalls of the gorge (near Tsangpo Badong, Chinese: 藏布巴东瀑布群) were visited in 1998, by a team consisting of Ken Storm, Hamid Sarder, Ian Baker and their Monpa guides. They estimated the height of the falls to be about 33 metres (108 ft). The falls and rest of the Pemako area are sacred to Tibetan Buddhists who had concealed them from outsiders including the Chinese authorities. In 2005 Chinese National Geography named them China's most beautiful waterfalls.

There are two waterfalls in this section: Rainbow Falls (about 21 metres or 70 feet high) at 29.777164°N 95.183406°E and Hidden Falls just downstream at 29.776023°N 95.181974°E (about 30 metres or 100 feet high).

== Yarlung Tsangpo Hydroelectric and Water Diversion Project ==
While the government of the PRC has declared the establishment of a "Yarlung Tsangpo Grand Canyon National Reservation", there have also been governmental plans and feasibility studies for the Medog Project, a major dam to harness hydroelectric power and divert water to other areas in China. The size of the dam in the Tsongpo gorge would exceed that of Three Gorges Dam as it is anticipated that such a plant would generate 50 gigawatts of electricity, more than twice the output of Three Gorges. It is feared that there will be displacement of local populations, destruction of ecosystems, and an impact for downstream people in India and Bangladesh. The project is criticized by India because of its potential negative impact upon the residents downstream.

In 1999, R.B. Cathcart suggested that a fabric dam—inflatable with freshwater or air—could block the Yarlung Tsangpo Canyon upstream of Namcha Barwa. Water would then be conveyed via a hard rock tunnel to a point downstream from that mountain.

== References in media ==
- The gorges may have helped inspire the idea of Shangri-La in James Hilton's book Lost Horizon in 1933.
- In the 2007 fighting game Akatsuki Blitzkampf, the biggest base and research facility of the villainous organization Gessellschaft is hidden in the Yarlung Tsangpo Grand Canyon, referred to in-story as the "Tsangpo Ravine". The second part of the game takes place in said base, with the player fighting their way inside it until they reach the last enemy.

== See also ==
- Nyingchi
- Zangmu Dam
- South–North Water Transfer Project
- Inga dams
- Bailey–Morshead exploration of Tsangpo Gorge

== Videos ==
- Scott Lindgren (2002), "Into the Tsangpo Gorge". Slproductions. ASIN B0006FKL2Q.
- Into the Tsangpo Gorge Documentary
