= Mêdog County =

County in Tibet, China

Mêdog County 墨脱县 • མེ་ཏོག་རྫོང་། Metok, Motuo, Pemako
- County
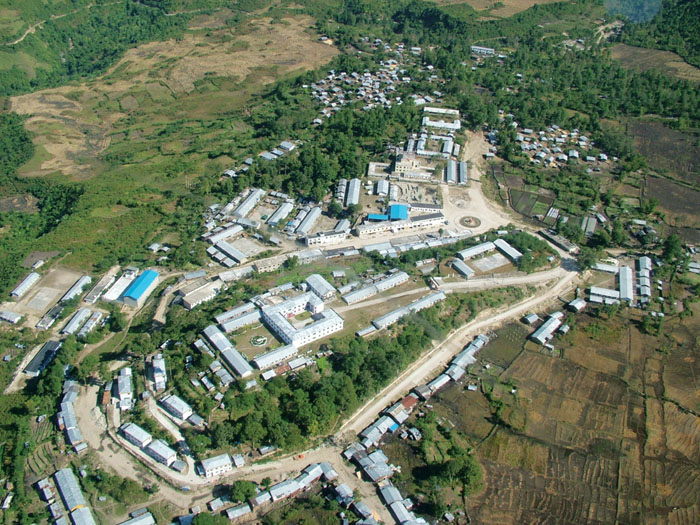

- Location of the seat in Tibet Mêdog (China)
- Coordinates (Mêdog government): 29°19′30″N 95°19′59″E
- Country: China
- Autonomous Region: Tibet
- Prefecture-level city: Nyingchi
- County seat: Mêdog

Area (de facto controlled)
  - Total: 6,600 km^{2} (2,500 sq mi)

Population (2020)
  - Total: 14,889
  - Density: 2.3/km^{2} (5.8/sq mi)
- Time zone: UTC+8 (China Standard)
- Website: www.motuo.gov.cn

Mêdog County

Chinese name
- Simplified Chinese: 墨脱县
- Traditional Chinese: 墨脫縣
Transcriptions
Standard Mandarin
- Hanyu Pinyin: Mòtuō Xiàn

Tibetan name
- Tibetan: མེ་ཏོག་རྫོང་།
Transcriptions
- Wylie: me tog rdzong
- Tibetan Pinyin: Mêdog Zong

Mêdog (Tibetan: མེ་ཏོག་རྫོང་།; Chinese: 墨脱县), formerly known as Pemako (Tibetan: པདྨ་བཀོད་, Wylie: pad ma bkod, THL: Pémakö, ZWPY: Bämagö lit. "Lotus Array"), is a county of Nyingchi in the Tibet Autonomous Region, China. Pemako is considered famous because it is the Nyingma master Dudjom Rinpoche's birthplace, and it is a prophesied refuge for Tibetan Buddhists by Padmasambhava.

== History ==
Frank Kingdon-Ward was the first Westerner to describe the area in his 1925 book, Riddle of the Tsangpo Gorges. In his 1994 Tibet Handbook, Hong Kong-born Victor Chan describes the extremely difficult trek from Pemakö Chung to the beyul Gonpo Ne, one of the remotest spots on earth. A modern journey by Ian Baker and his National Geographic-sponsored team to Pemakö received book-length treatment in his 1994 The Heart of the World.

Since 1904, the year Kabgye Dudjom Rinpoche was born in Pemako, people from all over Tibet, especially from Khams, Golok, and U-Tsang, entered Pemako and settled near their lama. Nyingma centers in Pemako were also connected to Kyabje Dudjom Rinpoche.

Ever since Pemako was first opened to the outside world thousands of people settled in the region. The Tsanglha people were the original inhabitants of Pemako, as Pemako was part of Monyul. Monyul includes present day Arunachal Pradesh, Bhutan and Sikkim. The Tshangla community continued to grow into the beginning of the 18th century right until the early 20th century. Political and religious turmoil in Tibet forced many Tibetans to join Tshangla people in Pemako, a land where religious serenity pledge through many revered Lamas who had been to this land, prophesied by Padmasambhava in the mid-8th century to be a land of final call where devotees would be flocking at the time of religious persecutions, the last sanctuary for Buddhism, with the time Pemako's popularity grew more and more, with the popularity many Tibetan people particularly from Kham followed their Lamas and settled alongside Tshangla populace.

Over the period of time, Tibetans and Tshangla migrants amalgamated to form an homogeneous group called Pemakopas (Pad-ma dkod pa). The process of infusion gave birth to a new Tshangla dialect called Pemako dialect.

The majority of the people in Pemako speak the Tshangla language. Historically, Tshangla speakers migrated from eastern Bhutan around the 17th century during the Drukpa conquest led by Zhabdrung Ngawang Ngamgyal. It was reported that over several hundred families made their way to Pemako. Ngatshang and Chitsang clans were there in Pemako, later joined by many more people who left their homeland in a quest for better life.

When the first Tsangla people arrived in Pemako they settled in the lower Yarlung valley, surrounded by Kongpopas in the northwest, Pobas in the northeast, and Lhopas in the south. The Tsangla adopted many customs from their neighbors but still retained their original language. Historically, the area came under the rule of Powo (Bomê) kings who ruled the entirety of Pemako (now Medog). During Powo rule, Pemako residents had good relations with the Tibetans. They jointly fought against the Tani (Adis) and Mishmis who regularly disturbed the pilgrimage.

By 1931, the Tibetan government (Ganden Phodrang) was able to dismantle the Powo kingdom and the region came under the direct rule of the central Tibetan Government in Lhasa. Ganden Phodrang had its governor stationed in Medog Dzong, who looked after the territory and established communications between Lhasa and Pemako. Compulsory taxes in cash or goods were to be paid to Lhasa. The region of Pemako was divided among different monasteries and different aristocratic families. Some regions of Pemako pay tax to the Sera Monastery in the form of grains, chillis, bamboo poles for prayer flags (Dharchen), products made of cane, medicinal herbs such as yertsa-goonbu, mushroom, and animal skin.

On April 25, 1951, the 18th Army of the Chinese People's Liberation Army assigned Bomi, Luoyu, and Gongbu to the jurisdiction of the Bomi Division of Labor. On July 23, 1959, Medog County was under the jurisdiction of the Tagong Division Committee. On August 27 of the same year, the Medog County Party Committee and the county government were formally established in the Pai District of Milin County. On February 24, 1960, the Pagoda Works Division was renamed Nyingchi Division, and Medog County was under its jurisdiction. In July 1964, Medog County was placed under the jurisdiction of Lhasa City. On February 1, 1986, Medog County was placed under the jurisdiction of Nyingchi Prefecture. In 1988, the district was withdrawn and the township was merged, and a total of 8 townships and 59 administrative villages were established. In May 1988, Damuluoba Ethnic Township was established. In 1999, Medog Township was revoked and Medog Town was established. In March 2015, the Nyingchi area was abolished and prefecture-level Nyingchi City was established, and Medog County was under the jurisdiction of Nyingchi City.

== Geography ==
The total land area of Medog County is 31,273.41 square kilometers, of which the actual jurisdiction area is about 6,600 square kilometers. It is located in the lower reaches of the Yarlung Zangbo River, at the southern foot of the Himalayas, surrounded by mountains on the east, west, and north sides, and the Yarlung Zangbo River passes from north to south. It is also mainly located in Yarlung Tsangpo Grand Canyon. The north are the Kangri Karpo mountains, the west and northwest are the high mountains of the Himalayas, and the south is the Yarlung Zangbo River Valley. The highest peak, Namjagbarwa Peak, is 7,782 meters above sea level. Due to the melting and erosion of alpine ice and snow and the cutting of rivers, the cutting depth of most of the mountains in Medog County is more than two kilometers.

== Climate and ecology ==
Due to the large elevation difference in the terrain, there are obvious vertical climate changes in the mountains. The annual sunshine hours in Medog County are 1500.7 hours, and the annual average temperature in the valley area is 18 °C–22 °C. The average temperature in July is 25 °C–28 °C, and the average temperature in January is 12 °C–16 °C. There is no frost or occasional light frost throughout the year, and the annual precipitation is 2000–5000 mm. There are 3 species of wild plants under China's national first-level key protection, 10 species of second-level key protected wild plants, 17 species of first-level national key protected wild animals, and 42 species of second-level key protected wild animals.

Due to the heavy precipitation in the area, Medog County has dense forests including the Northeastern Himalayan subalpine conifer forests at middle altitudes and the Eastern Himalayan broadleaf forests at lower altitudes. At higher altitudes, the mountains are covered by Eastern Himalayan alpine shrub and meadows.

Medog has a favorable climate caused by the relatively low elevations in parts of the county (down to just 600 m above sea level in the Yarlung Zangbo river valley) and by the South Asian monsoon, which brings moisture from the Indian Ocean. The area is lush and covered with trees and includes the Medog National Animal and Plant Reserve Area. It has more than 3,000 species of plants, 42 species of rare animals under special state protection, and over a thousand hexapod species.

== Transportation ==
Mêdog was the last county without permanent road access in China (including Tibet), due to the landscape of several high-elevation mountain ranges. A first, simple road was built in the 1970s, yet it was usually blocked by ice and snow on the mountains in the winter, making it only accessible seasonally. In December 2010, the Chinese government announced a project to renovate the road into a permanent highway from Bomê to Mêdog County, including excavation of a new tunnel under the mountain range. The renovation was completed in 2013. As of 2025, the road has been extended from Mêdog to Gelling.

Before the completion of the highway, transportation in Mêdog primarily relied on foot. Hiking to Mêdog is also a popular activity among tourists, although it is generally considered highly exhausting and risky. A primary route for accessing Mêdog begins in Bomê County, which inspired the route of the current permanent highway. Another important route for traveling to Mêdog on foot starts in Pai (a township in Mainling County) and travels all the way along the Yarlung Tsangpo Grand Canyon to Mêdog township, which is a route particularly popular among backpackers.

== Administrative divisions ==
Mêdog County comprises 1 towns, 6 townships and 1 ethnic township:

Name	Chinese	Hanyu Pinyin	Tibetan	Wylie
Town
Metok Town	墨脱镇	Mòtuō zhèn	མེ་ཏོག་གྲོང་རྡལ།	me tog grong rdal
Townships
Jarasa Township	加热萨乡	Jiārèsà xiāng	བྱ་ར་ས་ཤང་།	bya ra sa shang
Ganden Township	甘登乡	Gāndēng xiāng	དགའ་ལྡན་ཤང་།	dga' ldan shang
Bangxing Township	帮辛乡	Bāngxīn xiāng	སྤང་ཞིང་ཤང་།	spang zhing shang
Gutang Township	格当乡	Gédāng xiāng	དགུ་ཐང་ཤང་།	dgu thang shang
Dezhing Township	德兴乡	Déxīng xiāng	བདེ་ཞིང་ཤང་།	bde zhing shang
Drepung Township	背崩乡	Bèibēng xiāng	འབྲས་སྤུངས་ཤང་།	'bras spungs shang
Ethnic township
Takmo Lhoba Ethnic Township	达木珞巴族乡	Dámù Luòbāzú xiāng	སྟག་མོ་ལྷོ་པ་མི་རིགས་ཤང་།	stag mo lho pa mi rigs shang
* includes areas claimed but currently under control of the Indian state of Arunachal Pradesh.

== Society ==
According to the results of the seventh national census of the People's Republic of China in 2020, the permanent population of Medog County is 14,889, including 8,528 males and 6,361 females; 3,386 people aged 0–14, 10,518 aged 15–59, and 985 aged 60 and over 7,842 Monba (Tshangla), 3,376 Han, 1,541 Lhoba, 1,883 Tibetan, and 247 other ethnic minorities; the urban population is 3,318, and the rural population is 11,571. In 2022, the county's GDP will be 792 million yuan, the fixed asset investment of the whole society will be 1.066 billion yuan, the total retail sales of social consumer goods will be 67.895 million yuan, the general public financial budget revenue will be 68.1 million yuan, the per capita disposable income of urban residents will be 43,433 yuan, and the per capita income of rural residents will be 43,433 yuan. The disposable income is 17035 yuan.

There are mainly two kinds of cultivated land in Medog County, paddy field and dry land, of which the area of paddy field is 4,755.2 mu (317.01 hectares or 783.3 acres), the area of dry land is 32,905.3 mu (2,193.69 ha or 5,420.7 acres), and the grassland is mainly natural grassland, of which 4,479.3 mu (298.62 ha or 737.9 acres) is grazing grassland in summer and autumn, 122,530.5 mu (8,168.700 ha or 20,185.30 acres) is non-seasonal grazing grassland, and 109,739.6 mu (7,315.973 ha or 18,078.16 acres) is temporary grazing grassland mu, accounting for 46.35% of pasture land. The main crops are rice, upland rice, rapeseed, corn, highland barley, chicken feet, soybeans, peanuts, potatoes, sugar cane, etc. The economic forests mainly include apples, citrus, bananas, plantains, lemons, figs, etc. The industry is based on rattan weaving, bamboo weaving and stone tool processing. Medog County is the last county in the Tibet Autonomous Region with road access. The first dirt road was built in 1994, but some sections of the road were immediately destroyed by large-scale landslides and mudslides. In 2013, the Zha-Mo Road was completed and opened to traffic, ending the lack of road access in Medog County. History. As of 2019, the total mileage of highways in Medog County is 524.23 kilometers, including 117 kilometers of county roads, 130.11 kilometers of township roads, and 277.12 kilometers of village roads.

Medog county is diverse, with different ethnicities intermixing for many centuries. Residents include Tshangla people, Kongpopas, Poba, and Khampa Tibetans, and Lhoba people (Adi, Mishmis) live here, while Tshangla speakers make up the majority about 60% of the total population of 10,000–12,000 (According to 2001 census in Metok county (Dzong) there were about 10,000 people). People in Pemako called themselves Pemakopa. They also call themselves Monba as they originally migrated to the region of Mon which comprises present Bhutan and Tawang. In exile Pemakopa people spread through the world, but mainly concentrated in Tibetan settlements of Miao choephelling, Tezu Dhargyeling, Tuting and area, Orissa-Jerang camp, Tibetan Women Centre – Rajpur, Clementown, Delhi area. There are approximately 100 individuals in Europe, 130 in the United States and 980 in Canada.

== Language ==
The Pemako Tshangla dialect (Tibetan: པདྨ་བཀོད་ཚངས་ལ་སྐད་, Wylie: Padma-kod Tsangla skad, also Padma kod skad) is the predominant language in the Pemako region of Tibet and an adjoining contiguous area south of the McMahon line in Arunachal Pradesh in India. Though Tshangla is not a Tibetan language, it shares many similarities with Classical Tibetan, particularly in its vocabulary. Many Tibetan loanwords are used in Pemako, due to centuries of close contact with various Tibetan tribes in the Pemako area. The Pemako dialect has undergone tremendous changes due to its isolation and Tibetan influence. Unique Tsanglha dialect of is in danger of extinction due to demographic changes and migration in Tsanglha speaking regions in Tibet Autonomous Region, Eastern Bhutan, and Arunachal Pradesh. Dominant cultures that are coming in contact with Tsanglha is altering and influence the ability of this dialect to survive.

Tsangla or Pemakopa is one of the many languages of Tibet. Tsangla is widely spoken and understood by many non-Tsangla speakers in the area. People of Pemako also speak Standard Tibetan. The Pemakopa people also speak other dialects of Tibet, such as Khampa, Kongpo and Zayul dialects. Today inside Tibet Pemakopa people are also well versed in Mandarin Chinese. As the majority are Pemakopas, spoken Tsangla is well established. Pemakopa dialect of Tsangla doesn't have tones, unlike Standard Tibetan, but Tsangla language in Pemako uses high and low accents, which are absent in other Tsangla dialects. Pemakopa dialect's numerical denominations up to 20 and higher are counted in Standard Tibetan. Worldwide, the Tsangla language has about 140,000–160,000 speakers.

== Religion ==
Majority of people in Pemako follow Nyingma tradition of Tibetan Buddhism. Some follow the indigenous Bon tradition as well. Lhoba people in Pemako practice a combination of animism and Buddhism.
