= Yarlung Tsangpo =

River flowing through China and India

Yarlung Tsangpo yar klung gtsang po ཡར་ཀླུང་གཙང་པོ། 雅鲁藏布江
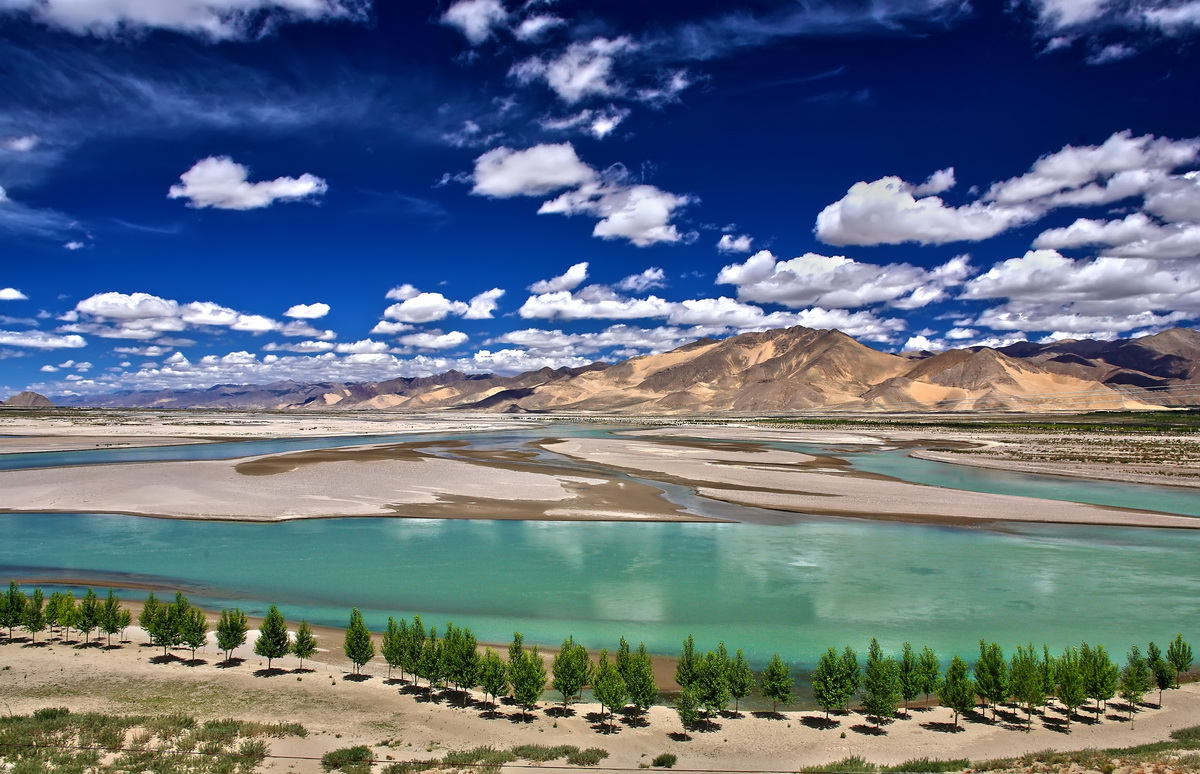
- Yarlung Tsangpo, Shigatse Prefecture

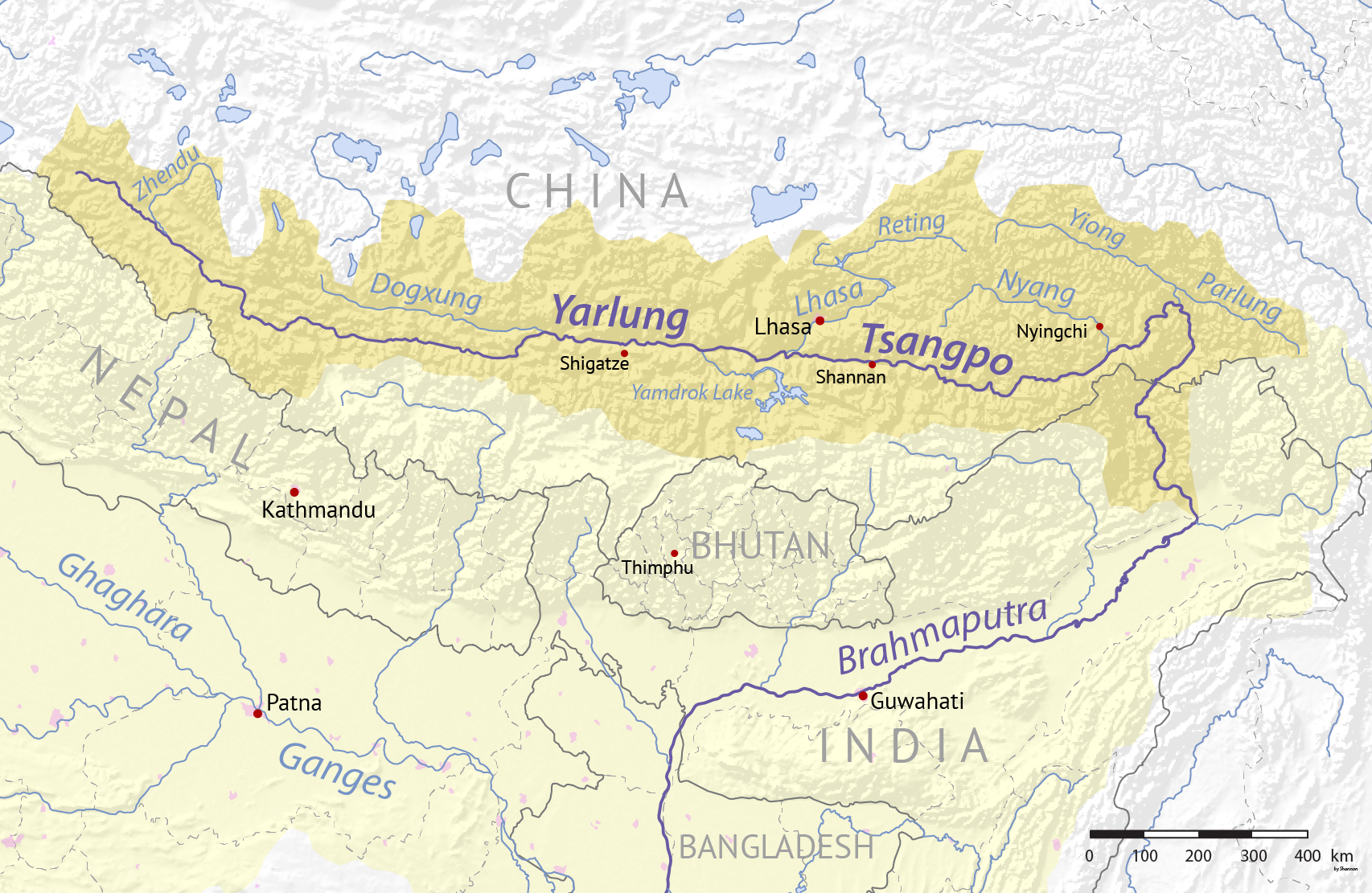
- Map of the Yarlung Tsangpo River Basin

Location
- Country: China (flows into India as the Brahmaputra and later into Bangladesh as the Jamuna)

Physical characteristics
- Source
  - location: Angsi Glacier in Shigatse, Tibet Autonomous Region, China
  - coordinates: 30°22′3″N 81°59′42″E
  - elevation: 5,210 m (17,090 ft)
- Length: 1,125 km (699 mi)
- Basin size: 241,691 km^{2} (93,317 mi^{2})
- Discharge
  - average: 2,898.9 m^{3}/s (102,370 cu ft/s)

Basin features
- Tributaries
  - left: Raka Tsangpo, Nimu Maqu, Lhasa, Nyang
- Transboundary crossing: Line of Actual Control; 29°7′42″N 95°1′21″E; 535 m (1,755 ft) elevation

The Yarlung Tsangpo, also called Yarlung Zangbo (Tibetan: ཡར་ཀླུངས་གཙང་པོ་, Wylie: yar kLungs gTsang po, ZWPY: Yarlung Zangbo) and Yalu Zangbu River (Chinese: 雅鲁藏布江; pinyin: Yǎlǔzàngbù Jiāng), is the upper course of Brahmaputra River. It flows through the Tibet Autonomous Region of China and Arunachal Pradesh state of India. It is the longest river of Tibet and the fifth longest in China. The upper section is also called Dangque Zangbu meaning "Horse River".

Originating from the Angsi Glacier in western Tibet, southeast of Mount Kailash and Lake Manasarovar, it later forms the South Tibet Valley. When leaving the Tibetan Plateau, the river forms the world's largest and deepest canyon, Yarlung Tsangpo Grand Canyon. before passing into Arunachal Pradesh where it gets far wider and is called the Siang. After reaching Assam, the river becomes known as the Brahmaputra.

== Description ==
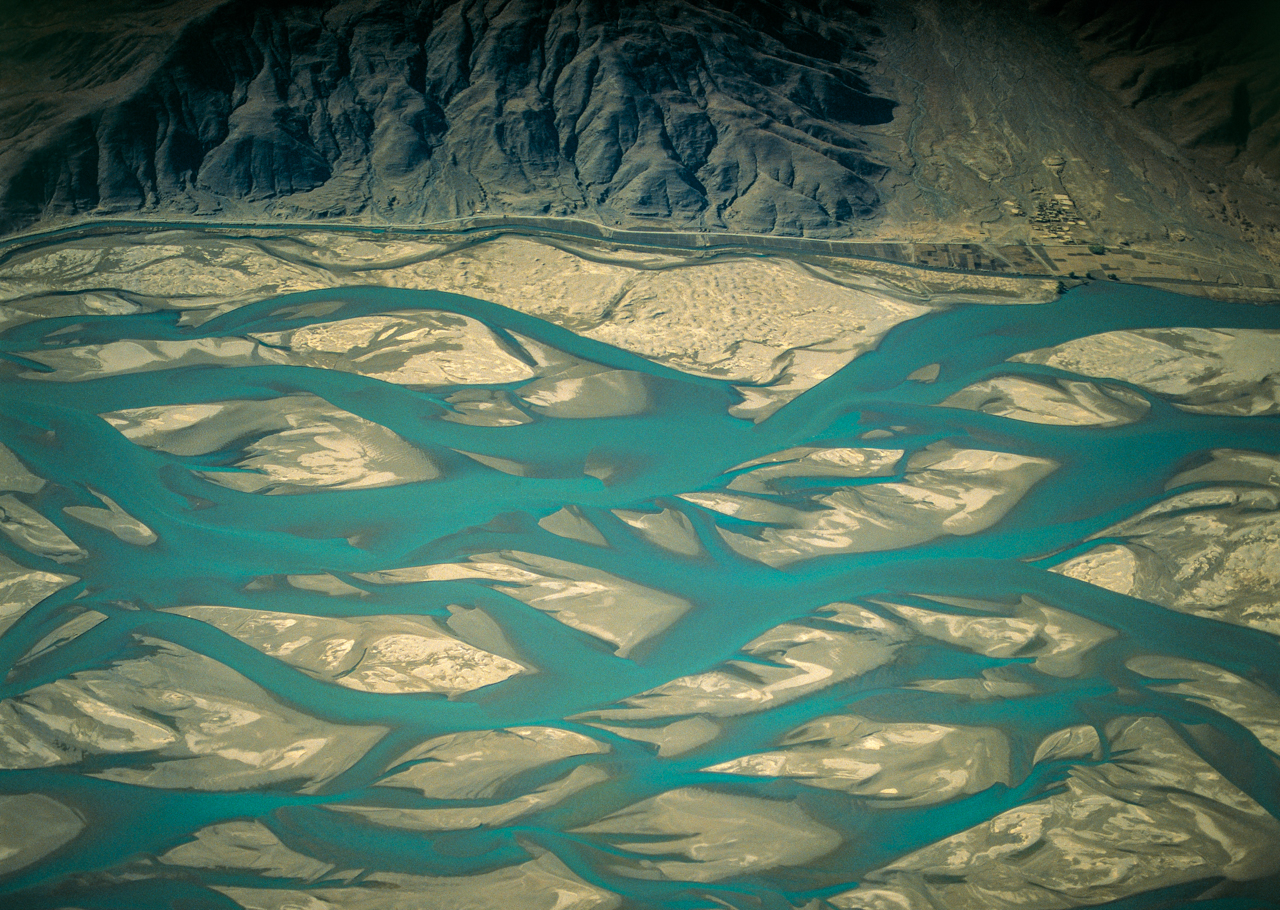
The Yarlung Tsangpo River in Tibet

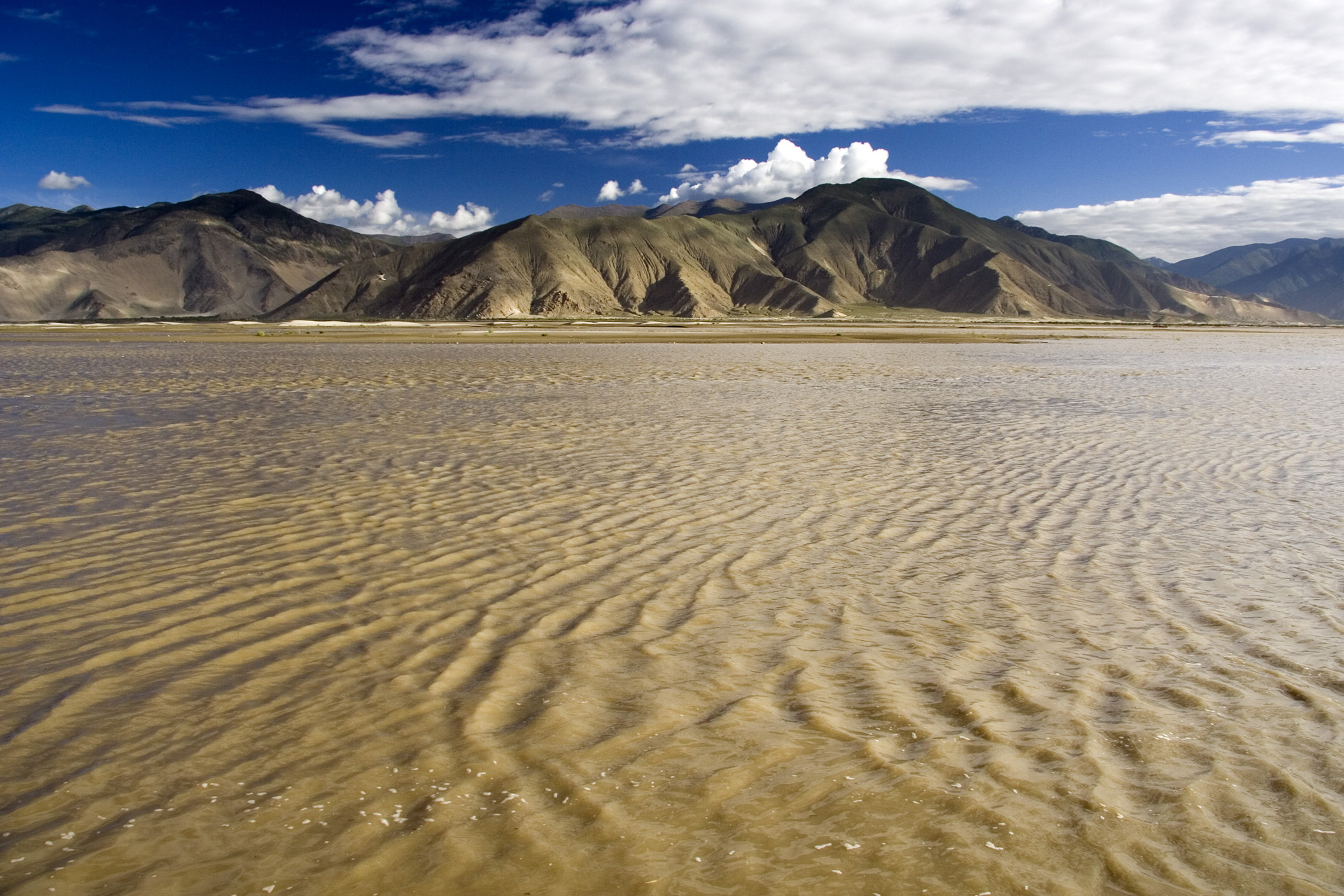
Yarlung Tsangpo River, sediment

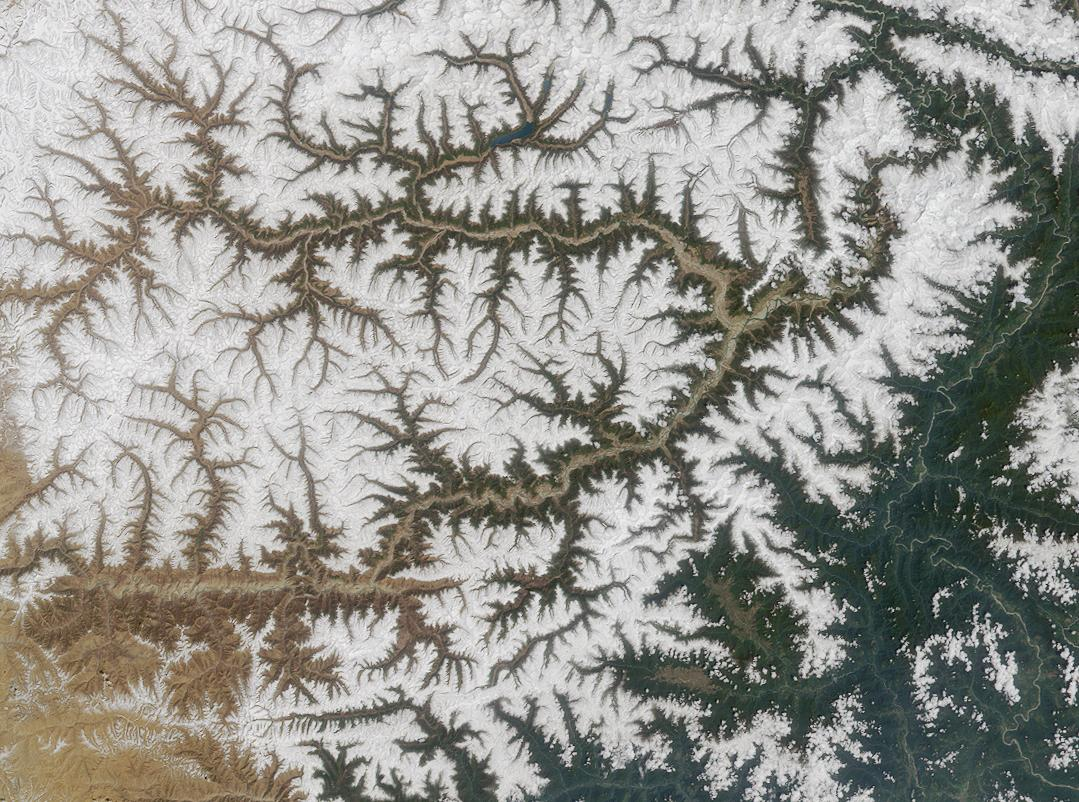
Yarlung Tsangpo River as it courses through Tibet, with peaks Namche Barwa and Gyala Peri. The picture is centered on 29.156°N 93.983°E

The Yarlung Tsangpo River is the highest major river in the world. Its longest tributary is the Nyang River. Major tributaries of Yarlung Tsangpo include Nyangchu River, Lhasa River, Nyang River, and Parlung Tsangpo.

In Tibet the river flows through the South Tibet Valley, which is approximately 1,200 kilometres (750 mi) long and 300 kilometres (190 mi) wide. The valley descends from 4,500 metres (14,800 ft) above sea level to 3,000 metres (9,800 ft). As it descends, the surrounding vegetation changes from cold desert to arid steppe to deciduous scrub vegetation. It ultimately changes into conifer and rhododendron forest. The tree line is approximately at 3,200 metres (10,500 ft). Sedimentary sandstone rocks found near the Tibetan capital of Lhasa contain grains of magnetic minerals that record the Earth's alternating magnetic field current.

The basin of the Yarlung River, bounded by the Himalayas in the south and Kang Rinpoche and Nyenchen Tanglha Mountains in the north, has less severe climate than the adjacent northern (and higher-altitude) parts of Tibet, and is home to most of the population of the Tibetan Autonomous Region.

The Yarlung Tsangpo Grand Canyon, formed by a horse-shoe bend in the river where it leaves the Tibetan Plateau and flows around Namcha Barwa, is the deepest, and possibly longest canyon in the world.

The Yarlung Tsangpo River has three major waterfalls in its course. The largest waterfall of the river, the "Hidden Falls", was not publicized in the West until 1998, when its sighting by Westerners was briefly hailed as a "discovery". They were even portrayed as the discovery of the great falls which had been the topic of stories told to early westerners by Tibetan hunters and Buddhist monks, but which had never been found by Western explorers at the time. The Chinese authorities contradicted, however, saying that Chinese geographers, who explored the gorge from 1973 on, had already taken pictures of the falls in 1987 from a helicopter.

== Kayak exploration ==
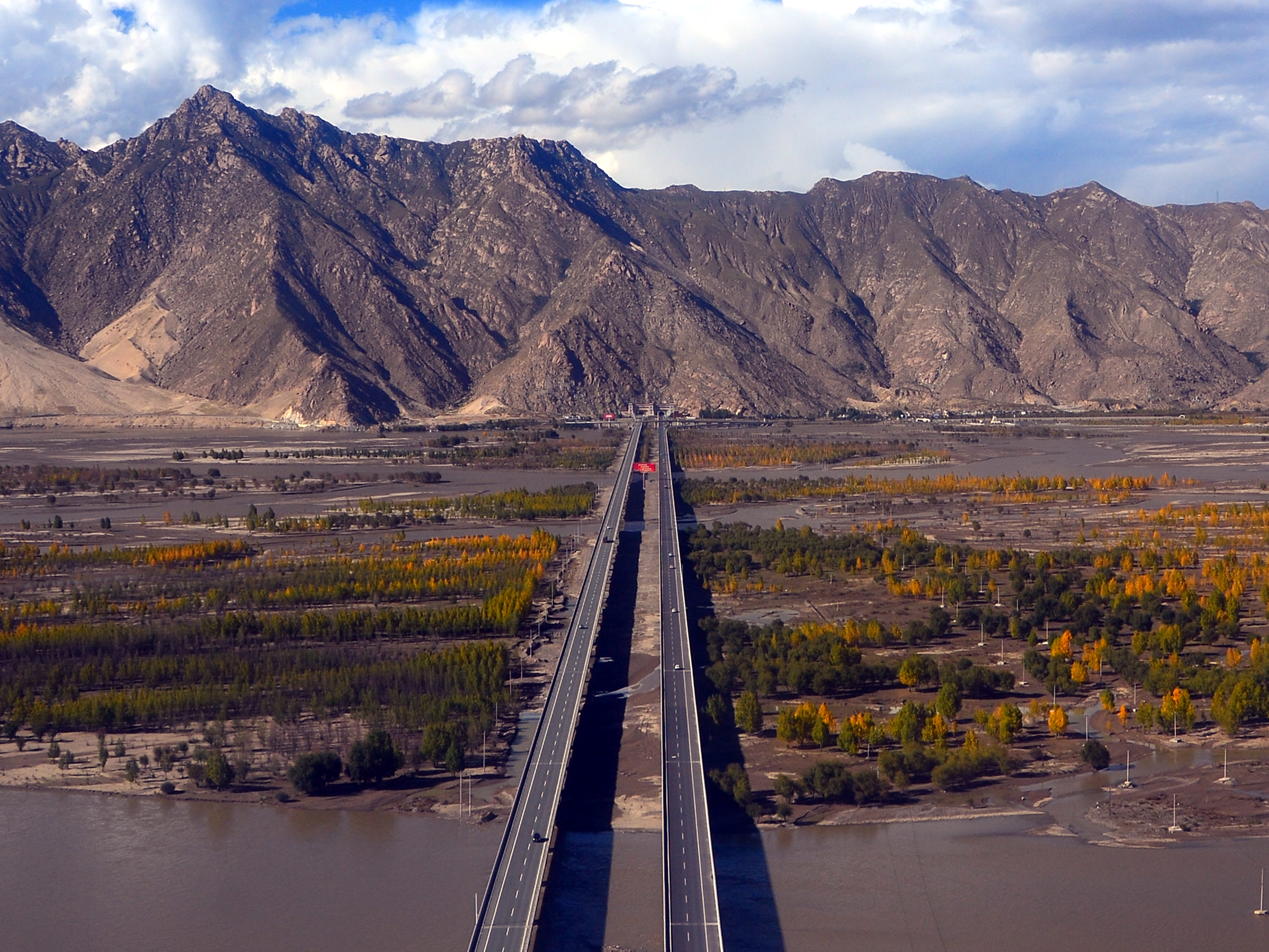
Bridge connecting Lhasa with the Gonggar International Airport across the Yarlung Tsangpo River

Since the 1990s the Yarlung Tsangpo River has been the destination of a number of teams that engage in exploration and whitewater kayaking. The river is noted for its extreme conditions. The first attempt to run was made in 1993 by a Japanese group who lost one member on the river.

In October 1998, a kayaking expedition sponsored by the National Geographic Society attempted to navigate the Yarlung Tsangpo Grand Canyon. Troubled by unanticipated high water levels, the expedition ended in tragedy with the death of expert kayaker Doug Gordon.

In January–February 2002, an international group consisting of Scott Lindgren, Steve Fisher, Mike Abbott, Allan Ellard, Dustin Knapp, and Johnnie and Willie Kern, completed the first descent of the upper Tsangpo gorge section.

== Dams and hydropower projects ==
In November 2020, the chairman of PowerChina announced the start of a hydroelectric project on the Yarlung Tsangpo which would be the world's largest.

In December 2024, China approved the construction of the Medog Hydropower Station, intended to be the world's largest hydropower dam on the Yarlung Tsangpo; the project would cost about 1 trillion yuan ($127bn; £109.3bn). The project officially commenced construction on 19 July 2025. India and Bangladesh have raised concerns about the impact in their countries when the dam becomes operational after 2030.
