= Harvey-Kelly =

Harvey-Kelly is a surname, and may refer to:

- Charles Harvey-Kelly (1885–1982), British Indian Army officer
- H. D. Harvey-Kelly (1891–1917), British Army officer and military aviator
- William Harvey-Kelly (1924–2015), British Army soldier
