= Henry Morshead =

English surveyor, explorer and mountaineer

Henry Treise Morshead
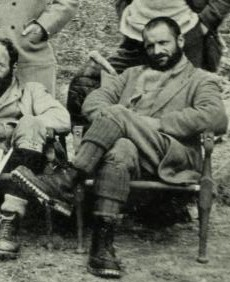
- Henry Morshead in 1921
- Born: 23 November 1882; Devon, England
- Died: 17 May 1931 (aged 48); Maymyo, Burma
- Occupation: Surveyor
- Employer: Survey of India
- Known for: Exploring Tsangpo Gorge, 1920s Mount Everest expeditions
- Spouse(s): Evelyn Morshead, née Widdicombe (1888–1978)
- Children: Hugh (1920–45), Ian (1922), Owen (1923–44), Audrey (1925), Nigel (1929)

Henry Treise Morshead DSO FRGS (23 November 1882 – 17 May 1931) was an English surveyor, explorer and mountaineer. He is remembered for several achievements – with Frederick Bailey he explored the Tsangpo Gorge and finally confirmed that the Yarlung Tsangpo flows into the Brahmaputra River after cascading through Himalaya; also he was a member of the 1921 and 1922 British Mount Everest expeditions and in 1922 he climbed to a height of over 25,000 feet (7,600 m). His death was due to murder and the circumstances remain mysterious.

== Early and personal life ==
Born in 1882 and brought up at Hurlditch Court, near Tavistock near the Devon–Cornwall border, Henry Morshead was the eldest son of Reginald Morshead, a banker, and Ella Mary Morshead, née Sperling. He was educated at Winchester College where he did reasonably well and at a second attempt passed the exams to enter the Royal Military Academy, Woolwich, to become an officer in the Royal Engineers in 1901. At the Chatham Royal School of Military Engineering he had such a distinguished record that in 1904 he was posted to the Indian Army in the Royal Engineers' Military Works Services at Agra. (Note: The group responsible for military engineering in India and Burma.)

In 1906 he joined the Survey of India where, as was often the case, he retained his military status and rank. Apart from his service in the Great War he remained with the Survey until his death. Morshead was based at Dehradun, Uttarakhand, the scientific and exploration headquarters of the Survey of India. He became in charge of the Forest Map Office, then the Computing Office, then the Triangulation Surveying Party. He became knowledgeable in the history of Himalayan exploration, particularly in Tibet. He distinguished himself on several arduous winter Himalayan expeditions. He was tough, well able to live off the land in regions of great heat and danger. Morshead was promoted to captain in 1912 .

On leave in 1916, he met Evelyn (Evie) Widdicombe who was Secretary and Librarian for the Froebel Society for the Promotion of the Kindergarten System. Her family had moved to Canada when Evie was a child where her father, Harry Templer Widdicombe, failed to make his fortune so her mother had returned to England with the children. Her mother had founded a ladies' residential club which flourished. Morshead married Evie in 1917 and they had four sons and a daughter. Two of their sons were killed in World War II.

== Exploration of the Tsangpo Gorge ==
North of Himalaya, the Yarlung Tsangpo River flows east through the Tibetan Plateau and then turns south into a series of massive gorges in Himalayan mountains. Until the 1880s it was unknown by which route it eventually reached the sea or even whether it debouched to the Pacific or Indian ocean. By 1911 the connection with the Brahmaputra River had become widely accepted but another mystery remained: the river dropped from 9,000 feet (2,700 m) to 1,000 feet (300 m) in a distance of perhaps 100 miles (160 km) which is extremely steep for a river of this size. It seemed there must be a massive waterfall and, indeed, Kinthup had reported one 150 feet (46 m) high.

In 1913 Frederick Bailey, an intelligence officer with the Indian Army, invited Morshead to be the surveyor in an expedition to explore the Yarlung Tsangpo Grand Canyon (Tsangpo Gorge), now known to be the world's deepest gorge. (Note: 16,650 feet (5,070 m) deep. The Grand Canyon is 6,998 feet (2,133 m).) Bailey and Morshead explored from the south with Morshead surveying the entire route and calculating the results as they went so as not to delay progress. By ascending the Dibang River they crossed the Himalayan watershed into Tibet to reach the Dihang River (Brahmaputra) and ascending the Gorge.

When they were at Lagung, just east of Namcha Barwa, they were arrested by the Nyerpa of Pome who took them to Showa on the Po Tsangpo river. After they had been imprisoned for several days they were released. They eventually reached the Dihang river again, this time upstream of the Gorge and just south of Gyala Peri from where they penetrated the massive sweep of the Tsangpo Gorge but only reached Pemakoi-chen where they found the gorge impassible about 45 miles (72 km) upstream of Lagung. They returned to India by turning back and passing through eastern Bhutan. The expedition covered 1,680 miles (2,700 km) on foot and lasted from 16 May to 14 November 1913.

In doing this they proved that the Dibang tributary of the Brahmaputra flows around rather than through the Himalayan mountains and does not connect with the Tsangpo. They also proved conclusively that the Tsangpo–Dihang–Brahmaputra was a single river and for the first time established its accurate course. The highest waterfall they found was 30 feet (9.1 m) and they considered there was unlikely to be a higher fall. For his work Morshead was awarded the Macgregor Medal by the United Service Institution of India. At the time the expedition was regarded as a great feat of exploration and it drew international acclaim.

== War service and return to Survey of India ==
On the outbreak of war in 1914 he was posted to India but was immediately sent back to England to train sappers. In 1915 he commanded the 212th Field Company, Royal Engineers 33rd Division in the Battle of the Hohenzollern Redoubt. His company was moved for the Battle of the Somme where he was promoted to major in 1916 and was awarded the DSO. He was at the Battle of Arras and the Battle of Passchendaele after which he was evacuated home with trench fever, returning to France in 1918 and promoted to brevet lieutenant colonel to command the 46th (North Midland) Divisional Engineers. He was wounded by shrapnel while reconnoitring the crossings of the St Quentin Canal and was sent back to England. After three weeks' leave he returned to the front but the war had by then just ended.

After the war Morshead, back in his substantive rank of major, returned to the Survey of India to lead survey work in Waziristan. In 1920 he accompanied Alexander Kellas in an attempt to climb the 25,447-foot (7,756 m) Kamet but the porters could not be persuaded to establish a camp at 23,500 feet (7,200 m). Morshead shouldered the blame – "I have nothing but praise for the Bhutia coolies of the higher Himalaya. On rock they climb like goats, while on ice they readily learn step-cutting. It appears very doubtful if the present-day expense of importing Alpine guides can ever justify their employment in future Himalayan exploration". Although the expedition did not reach the summit, their physiological studies at altitude were to be of help in the next years' Everest expeditions.

== Mount Everest ==
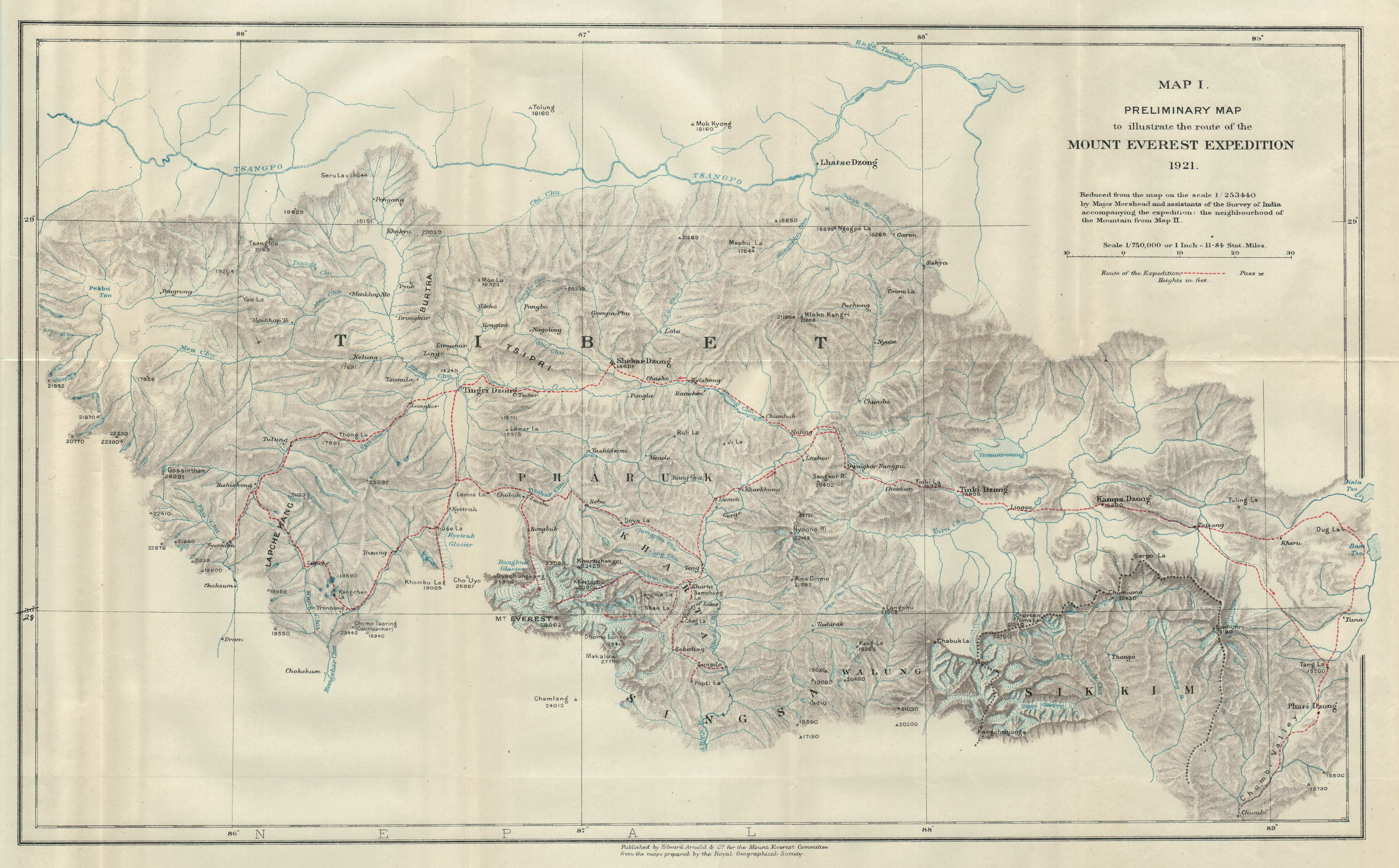
Morshead's map

On the 1921 British reconnaissance expedition, Morshead led the Survey of India team which mapped, at a scale of four miles to an inch (1:250,000), 12,000 square miles (31,000 km^{2}) of entirely unexplored country. During this expedition he climbed Kama Changri at 21,300 feet (6,500 m) and with George Mallory was the first to establish the camp on the 22,350-foot (6,810 m) Lhakpa La.

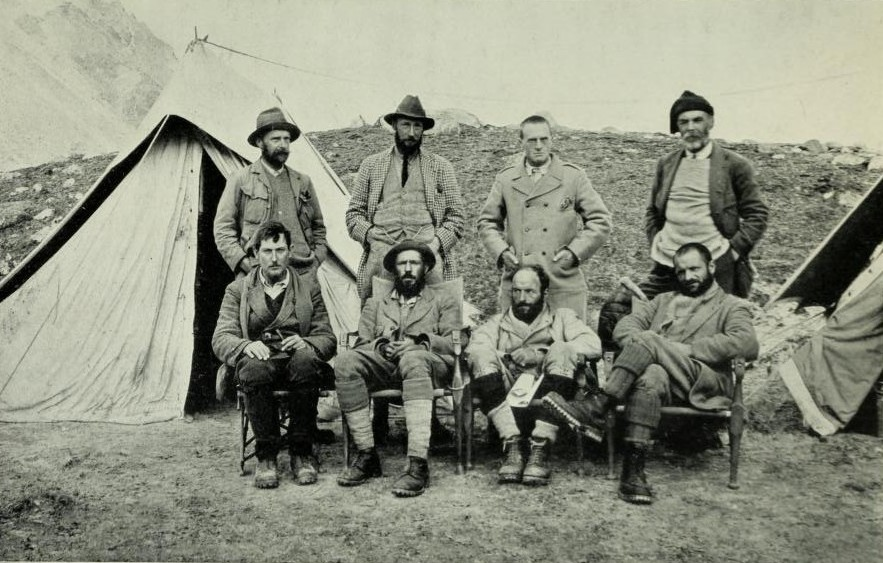
1921 Everest party. Morshead is front right.

In the 1922 expedition, Morshead was a member of the Everest climbing party itself. Because he had only been allowed leave at the last minute his expedition clothing had to be bought at Darjeeling bazaar and it was inadequate. On 20 May 1922 with Mallory, Howard Somervell and Teddy Norton, Morshead was in the first assault team, which attempted reaching the summit without oxygen. As the party left the North Col to head up towards the north east ridge, Norton's rucksack fell down to the glacier and this reduced the overnight clothing for camp V at 25,000 feet (7,600 m). The camp was at a higher altitude that anyone had ever been before. The next morning another rucksack was let slip but Morshead climbed down 100 feet (30 m) to recover it. However, on resuming the climb Morshead was almost immediately unable to continue and so went down to camp V while the other three continued. The team reached 26,985 feet (8,225 m) before turning back.

They joined Morshead at camp V who by then was very cold and all four immediately went down to camp IV on the North Col. On the way Morshead slipped and dragged two other man down the couloir. However Mallory managed to stop the fall and saved everyone's lives. They reached camp at 23:30 but a logistical error had meant that the stove and fuel had been taken to a lower camp so there was no liquid water and hence no edible food available. After surviving the night on the Col they descended to the glacier the next day but by then Somervell thought that Morshead was "not far from death". Norton, the expedition leader, wrote of him, "he kept going doggedly without complaint and in spite of a bad fall on an ice slope, knowing that the safety of the whole party depended on his determination to 'stay the course'". Morshead had severe frostbite to his hands and a foot and later three finger joints had to be amputated. However, at the time he hid the pain of his injuries from his colleagues.

== Bangalore and Burma ==
For the 1924 Everest expedition Morshead was not considered able to participate as a climber because of his injuries but he was offered the role of base camp and transport officer. He had to turn this down because his employers would not give permission, even for unpaid leave. However, in the 1924 Olympic Games medals were awarded for mountaineering and Morshead received a special medal awarded to the climbers on the 1922 expedition.

In 1923 a promotion involved relocating to Bangalore, far removed from Himalaya. He led an active social life, with sports and big game hunting on the agenda. In 1927, he joined a Cambridge University expedition to Spitsbergen after which he returned to India overland as far as Basra, Iraq. He was promoted to lieutenant colonel in 1928, becoming deputy director of the Geodetic Branch.

April 1929 brought promotion to Director of the Survey of India's Burma Circle (Note: In British India, many governmental functions were divided into regional directorates called "Circles".) where Morshead lived in Maymyo, Burma. At the time Burma was a province of British India. He studied the Burmese language and made lengthy tours of inspection of surveying in that country. Until this time his family had always lived with him but his eldest son became old enough for school and so returned to England, initially with the nanny.

== Morshead's murder ==
In February 1931 Morshead stayed in Burma while the rest of the family returned to England for reasons of schooling. It was a time of unrest. A rebellion had started in Burma, against British rule, and Thakin rebels were in the vicinity of Maymyo. A colleague of Morshead had been shot at by a disaffected Survey employee who had been convicted of attempted murder. On 17 May 1931 Morshead set off riding by himself and later that day his riderless pony was discovered back in Maymyo. After extensive searching his body was found next day in the jungle nearby. He had been shot in the chest at point blank range. Two people were arrested, an ex-Gurkha who had been out shooting at the time, and the man whose gun he had been using. There was no apparent motive and no charges were ever brought because both men seemed to have alibis.

In 1982 Morshead's son Ian published a biography of his father. Regarding his father's death he was suspicious because, although the first newspaper reports said his father had been murdered, later reports spoke of his being killed by a tiger, or by rebels. In 1980 Ian Morshead visited Burma and spoke to some of the people involved at the time. When his father's family were back in England, Henry's sister Ruth had been living with him in Burma. Henry disapproved of a local leader of the community, Syed Ali, who had been seen out horse riding with Ruth. Morshead had possibly had an argument with him. A week later on Henry's fatal pony trek it is likely he had borrowed Syed Ali's pony because when the pony returned unescorted to Maymyo it was to Syed Ali's house it went, passing right by Henry's house. Ian Morshead speculated, but finally doubted his own speculation, that Syed Ali had arranged for Henry to be killed and this had been carried out by the Gurkha.
