= MacGregor Medal =

Military award for adventure

MacGregor Memorial Medal
- Obverse and reverse of the medal
- Type: Military award
- Awarded for: "... military intelligence through reconnaissance, exploration and survey." (earlier) "... adventure activities." (later)
- Description: Obverse: an effigy of Major General Sir Charles MacGregor. Inscribed on the upper periphery is "MAJOR GENERAL SIR CHARLES MACGREGOR KCB CSI CIE". Inscribed on the lower periphery is "IN MEMORIAM 1887". Reverse: various figures of army personnel. Details of the awardee are inscribed on the outer rim.
- Country: India
- Presented by: United Service Institution
- Eligibility: All ranks (serving and retired) of the Armed Forces, Territorial Army, Reserve Forces, Rashtriya Rifles and Assam Rifles.
- Status: Active
- Established: 3 July 1888; 138 years ago
- First award: 1889
- Final award: 16 April 2025

Highlights
- Total: 133
- Total recipients: 131
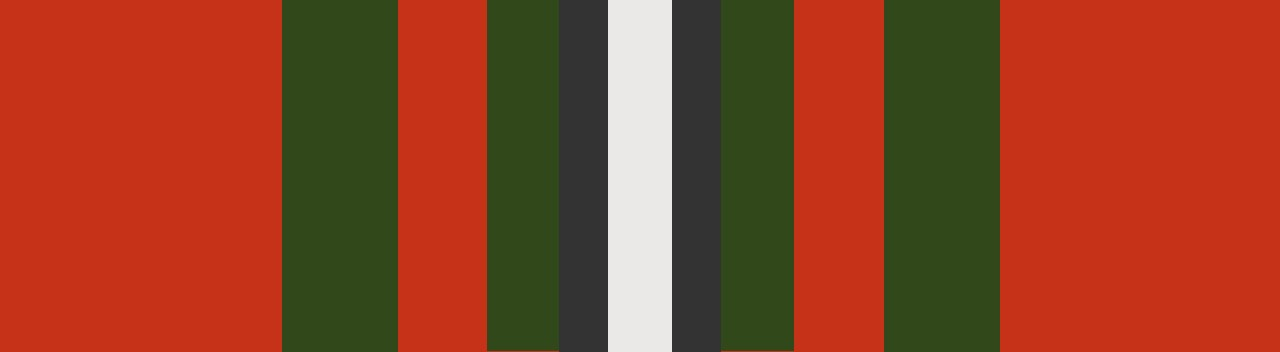
- Ribbon

The MacGregor Medal (also referred to as the MacGregor Memorial Medal) is awarded for valuable military intelligence through reconnaissance, exploration, survey or other similar activities of national importance. Awardees have included Survey of India personnel, military attaches, consuls, political officers and Indian Army, Navy and Air Force personnel (including British officers before Independence). Post 1947 the medal has only been awarded to military personnel. A few medals have been awarded for escapes from enemy-occupied territory while some medals were awarded for successful operations inside enemy territory. Sometimes the awardee would be conferred the medal years after the journey had been made. Currently the domains incorporated are land, sea and air. Over the years the necessity and opportunities related to exploration have declined and this in turn has been coupled with a decline in recommendations. In this light the eligibility has been expanded to adventure activities mountain and desert expeditions, rafting, world circumnavigation, polar expedition and flights.

== History ==
The medal was instituted in May 1887 to honour the memory of United Service Institution of India founder, Major General Sir Charles MacGregor. The original criteria for award of the medal were enunciated out on 3 July 1888 at Shimla at a meeting in the presence of Commander-in-Chief General Sir FS Roberts and the Viceroy of India. After the partition of British India into India and Pakistan, the award was adopted by India and continues to this day. As of 2019, 122 medals have been awarded: 7 gold medals to officers, 67 standard size silver medals to officers (including 5 VCOs and JCOs), and 48 reduced size silver medals to other ranks/soldiers. One British officer has been awarded the medal twice, A. S. Lancaster, as a major in 1938, and again as a colonel in 1946; and one British Indian, Shahzad Mir, first as Daffadar, in 1897, then again as Risaldar in 1906. For reconnaissance in 1891, Havildar Ramzan Khan, Punjab Frontier Force, was the first Indian to be awarded the medal.

== Specifications ==
There are three versions of the medal. The standard silver medal 2 3/4 inches (70 mm) without any attachments, the reduced gold medal 1 1/4 inches (32 mm) without any attachments and the reduced silver medal 1 1/4 inches (32 mm) with attachments to suspend around neck. The obverse side contains an effigy of Major General Sir Charles MacGregor. Inscribed on the upper periphery is "Major General Sir Charles MacGregor KCB CSI CIE". Inscribed on the lower periphery is "In Memoriam 1887". The reserve side contains various figures of army personnel. Details of the awardee are inscribed on the outer rim. The colours of the ribbon are (from left to right) — Red, Green, Red, Green, Black, White, Black, Green, Red, Green, Red. The colours are based on the 'MacGregor tartan'.

== Recent winners ==
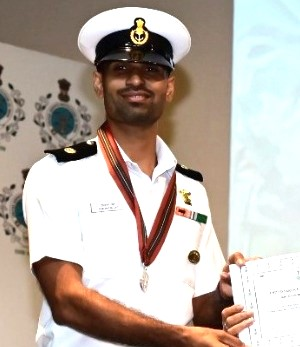
Jat, 2024: for the extreme adventure in long distance running

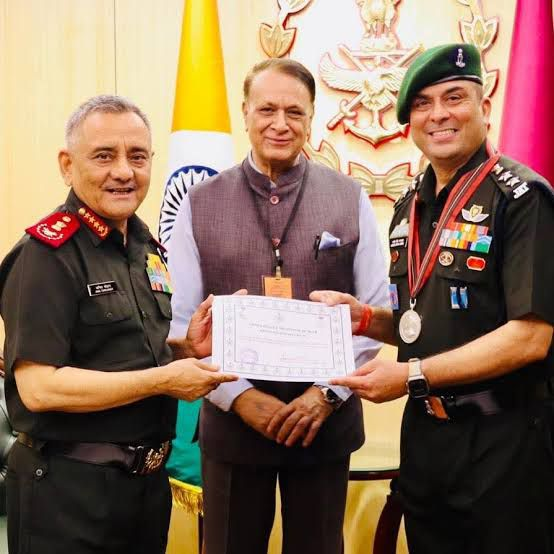
Jamwal, 2024: for operational reconnaissance and extreme adventure sports

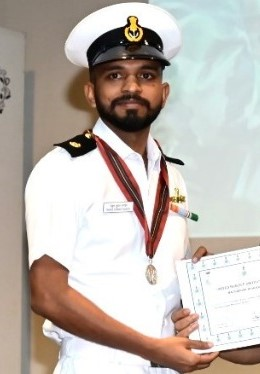
Pandey, 2023: for the extreme adventure in long distance running

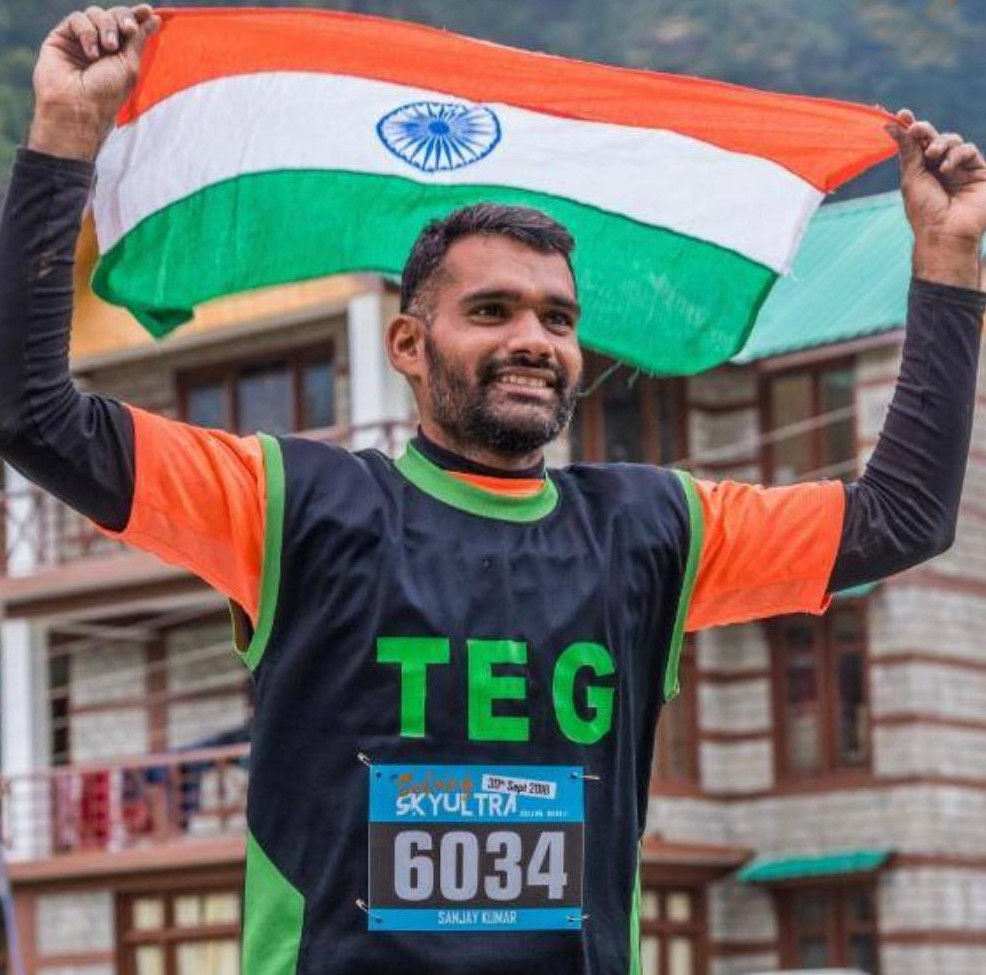
Kumar, 2020: for accomplishments in long distance running

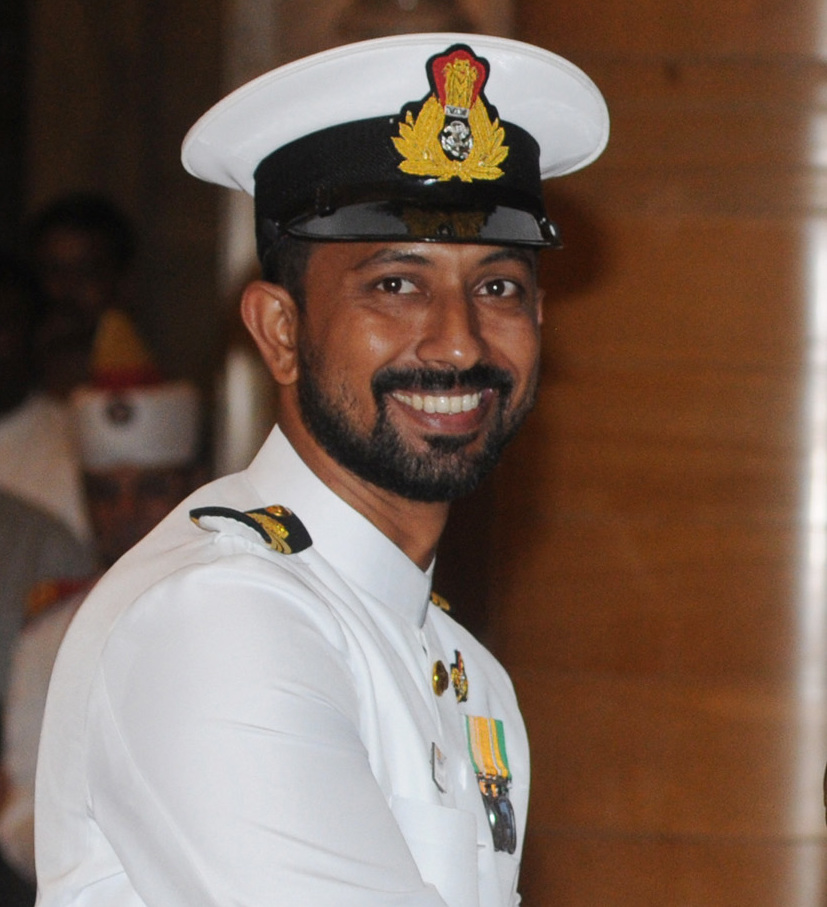
Tomy, 2013: first Indian to complete a solo, non-stop circumnavigation of the globe under sail

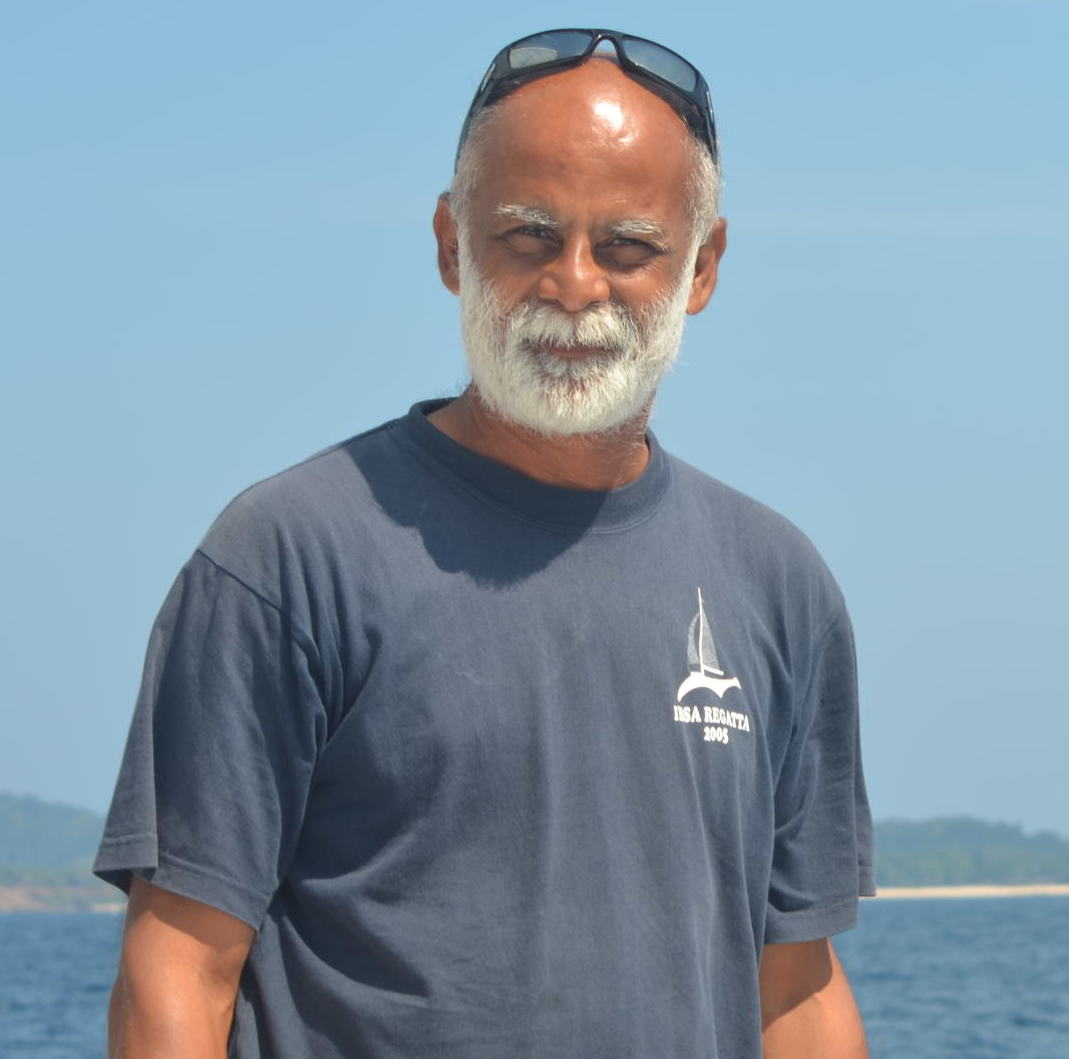
Donde, 2010: first Indian to complete a solo, unassisted circumnavigation of the globe under sail

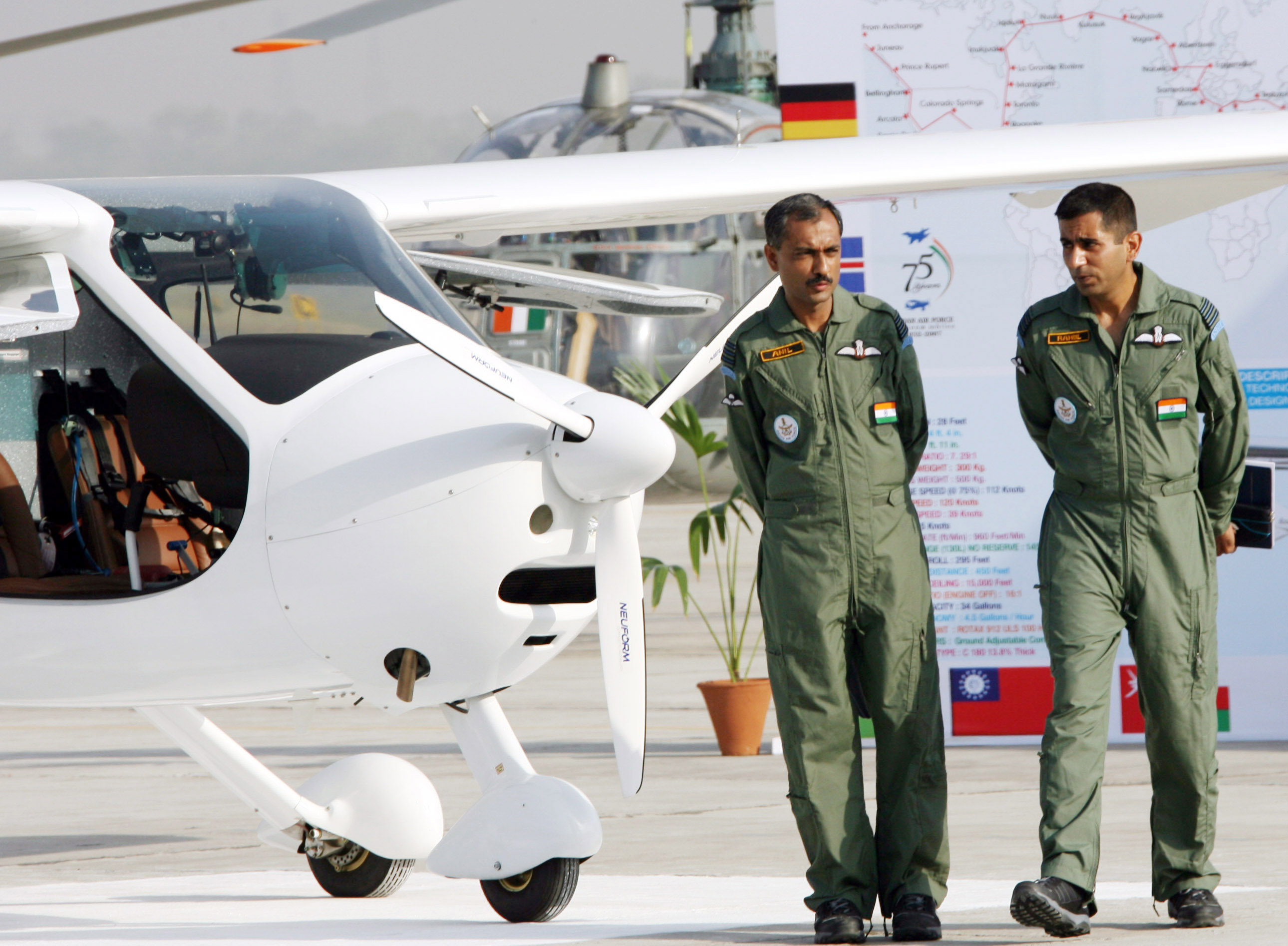
Monga & Kumar, 2007: world trip in a microlight aircraft

== Pre-1947 recipients ==
Key

- No. – Award number
- Rank – Rank at the time of the award
- Year – Year in which the exploration for which the award was given took place

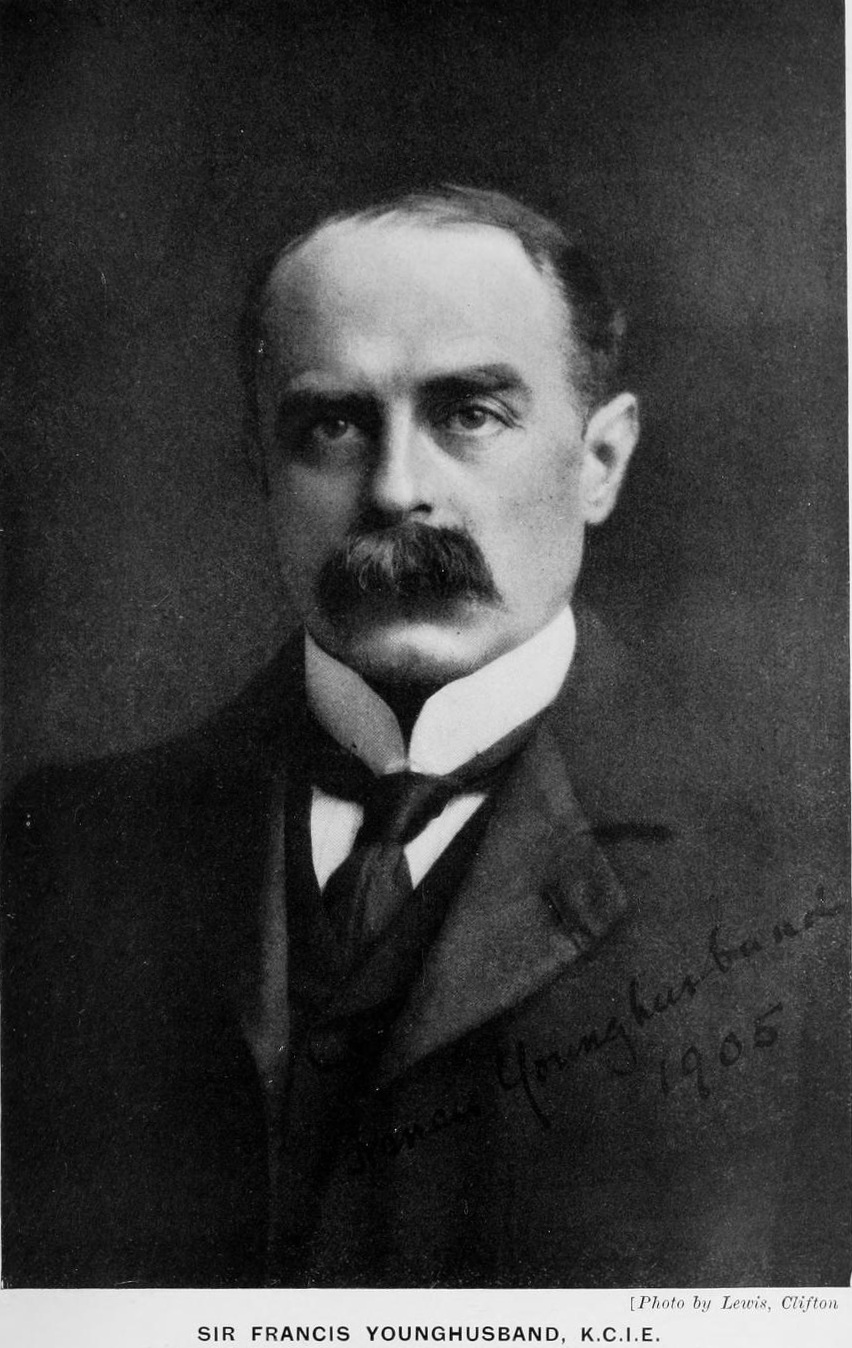
1890: F. Younghusband

1896: GK Cockerill

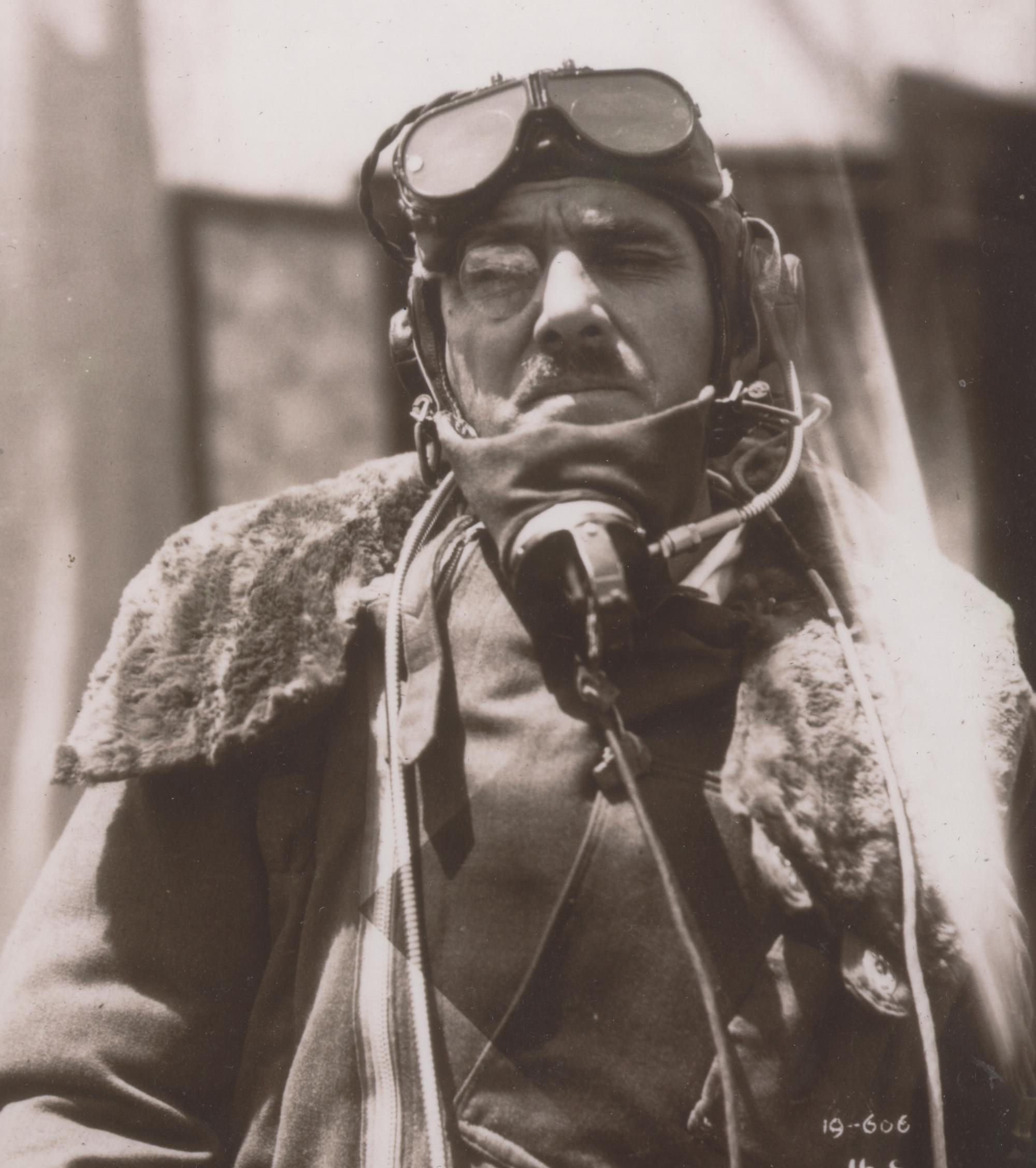
1920: S Blacker

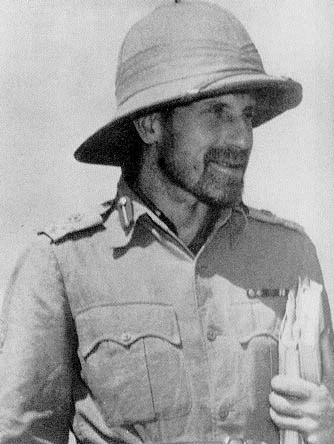
1943: OG Wingate

Only recipients with articles have been listed

No.	Name	Rank	Year	Ref/Notes
1	MS Bell	Colonel	1889	
2	F Younghusband	Captain	1890	
8	H Bower	Captain	1893	
12	HR Davies	Captain	1895	
14	GK Cockerill	Lieutenant	1896	
16	EJE Swayne	Captain	1897	
18	HB Walker	Captain	1898	
41	KBS Jang	Subedar	1910	
44	G Leachman	Captain	1911	
52	FM Bailey	Captain	1914	
53	HT Morshead	Captain	1914	
60	EWC Noel	Captain	1918	
61	EH Keeling	Lieutenant Colonel	1919	
63	LVS Blacker	Captain	1920	
65	AL Holt	Major	1921	
69	JG Bruce	Captain	1923	
76	CHGH Harvey–Kelly	Major	1926	
99	OC Wingate	Major General	1943	

== Post-1947 recipients ==
Awards were accompanied with entries in the Register for MacGregor Medal. The entry for Captain S.L. Tugnait, awarded for 1958, reads:

"Captain S.L. Tugnait... Air OP Squadron, Regiment of Artillery. Valuable Military Recce in Northern Ladakh. Covered the route from Leh over the 21,000 ft Chang La (Sic. 17,590 ft) into the Shyok River Valley to Ponyvang Lake (Sic. Pangong Tso). From there to Quazi-Haji Langer-Quaratag Pass, and back by the Karakuram Pass to Daulat Beg Oldi - Sasar Kangri over the Sasar La into the Nubra Valley and back to Leh over the 19,600 ft Kharding La"

No.	Service	Name	Awardee details		Year	Notes
No.	Service	Name	Rank	Other details	Year	Notes
104.	Indian Army	ZC Bakshi	Major	VrC, 2nd Bn, 5th Gorkha Rifles (F.F)	1949	
105.	Indian Army	IC Katoch	Colonel	MBE, 6th Bn, 5th Gorkha Rifles (F.F)	1951	
106.	Indian Army	MS Jarg	Captain	3rd Bn, Jat Regiment	1956	
107.	Indian Army	IB Goel	2nd Lieutenant	Bengal Engineers Group	1956	
108.	Indian Army	Vinod Badhwar	Captain	5th Bn, 5th Gorkha Rifles (F.F)	1957	
109.	Indian Army	SL Tugnait	Captain	Air Op Squadron, Regiment of Artillery	1958	
110.	Indian Army	ML Whig	Brigadier	MVC FRGS, 2nd Bn, 5th Gorkhas Rifles (F.F)	1969	
111.	Indian Army	Prem Chand	Major	VSM, 13th Bn, Dogra Regiment	1970	
112.	Indian Army	CS Nugyal	Colonel	6th Bn, Sikh Regiment	1971	
113.	Indian Army	Ravindra Misra	Captain	4th Bn, 3rd Gorkha Rifles	1972	
114.	Indian Army	Bel Bahadur Pun	Subedar	4th Bn, 3rd Gorkha Rifles	1972	
115.	Indian Army	Narender Kumar	Colonel	PVSM, KC, AVSM (Retd) Kumaon Regiment	1978 to 1981	
116.		Ram Karan Makkar	Squadron Leader	127 HU, Indian Air Force	1986	
117.		Rana TS Chhina	Flight Lieutenant	127 HU, Indian Air Force	1986	
118.	Indian Army	NJ Korgaokar	Lieutenant Colonel	SM, Garhwal Regiment	1997	
119.		Rahul Monga	Wing Commander	SC, Indian Air Force	2007	
120.		Anil Kumar	Wing Commander	SC, Indian Air Force	2007	
121.		Dilip Donde	Commander	Indian Navy	2010	
122.		Abhilash Tomy	Lieutenant Commander	KC, NM, Indian Navy	2013	
123.		Sanjay Kumar	Electrical Artificer (P) 3	Indian Navy	2019	
124.	Indian Army	Sanjeev Kumar	Havildar (Operator)	Indian Army	2020	
125.		Anshu Kumar Tiwari	Master Warrant Officer	Indian Air Force	2021	
126.	Indian Army	Ajay Kumar Singh	Major	Indian Army	2021	
127.	Indian Army	Digvijay Thakur	Major	Indian Army	2022	
128.		Kunal Sharma	Wing Commander	Indian Air Force	2022	
129.		D Panda	Wing Commander	Indian Air Force	2023	
130.		Rahul Kumar Pandey	Chief Electrical Artificer (Radio)	Indian Navy	2023	
131.		Ram Ratan Jat	Chief Electrical Aircraft Artificer (Radio)	Indian Navy	2024	
132.		Jhumar Ram Poonia	Sergeant	Indian Air Force	2024	
133.	Indian Army	Ranveer Jamwal	Colonel	SM, VSM**, Indian Army	2024	

== See also ==
- Wing Commander Jag Mohan Nath
- Major General Rajendra Nath
