= Frederick Marshman Bailey =

British political officer in India (1882–1967)

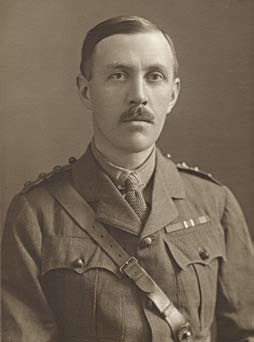
- Bailey in 1934
- Born: February 3, 1882; Lahore, British India
- Died: April 17, 1967 (aged 85); Stiffkey, Norfolk, England
- Education: Royal Military College, Sandhurst
- Occupations: British Army officer, explorer, spy, botanist and zoologist
- Notable work: Mission to Tashkent
- Awards: Order of the Indian Empire; Fellow of Royal Geographical Society; MacGregor Medal

Frederick Marshman Bailey CIE FRGS (3 February 1882 – 17 April 1967) was a British political officer and one of the last major figures of the Great Game. His expeditions in Tibet and Assam Himalaya gave him many opportunities to pursue his hobbies of photography, butterfly collecting and trophy hunting in the high Tibetan region. Over 2000 of his bird specimens were presented to the Natural History Museum, although his personal collection is now held in the American Museum of Natural History, New York. His papers and extensive photograph collections are held in the British Library, London.

== Early life ==
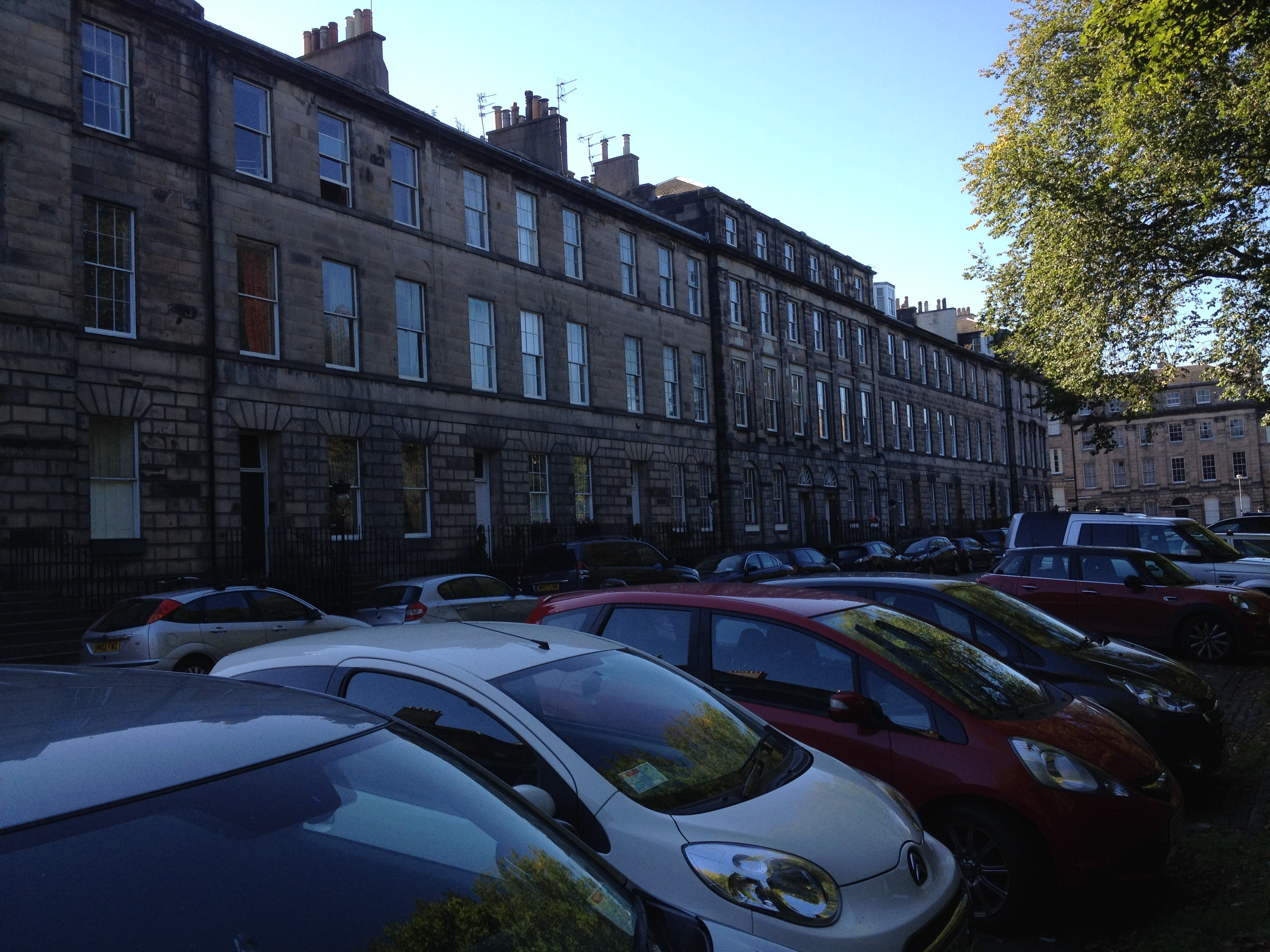
Drummond Place, Edinburgh

Born in Lahore, India on 3 February 1882, Bailey was the son of Lt Col Frederick Bailey of the Royal Engineers of the British Army, Head of the Indian Forestry Service, and his wife, Florence Agnes Marshman. The younger Bailey was usually called "Eric". His family returned to Britain in 1890 and they lived at 7 Drummond Place in Edinburgh's Second New Town. He was educated nearby at Edinburgh Academy.

He later studied at Wellington College (1895-1899) and the Royal Military College, Sandhurst, from where he was commissioned onto the Unattached List of the Indian Army on 28 July 1900. He was admitted to the Indian Army on 26 October 1901 and was attached to the 17th Bengal Lancers. He was promoted to lieutenant on 28 October 1902 and transferred to the 32nd Sikh Pioneers on 1 March 1903. He obtained a transfer to the Foreign and Political Department on 24 January 1906. During a mission in Sikhim, he began to study Tibetan and became so proficient that he accompanied Francis Younghusband in his 1904 invasion of Tibet. He then served as the British Trade Agent in Gyantse (Tibet) at intervals between December 1905 and December 1909.

== Explorer ==
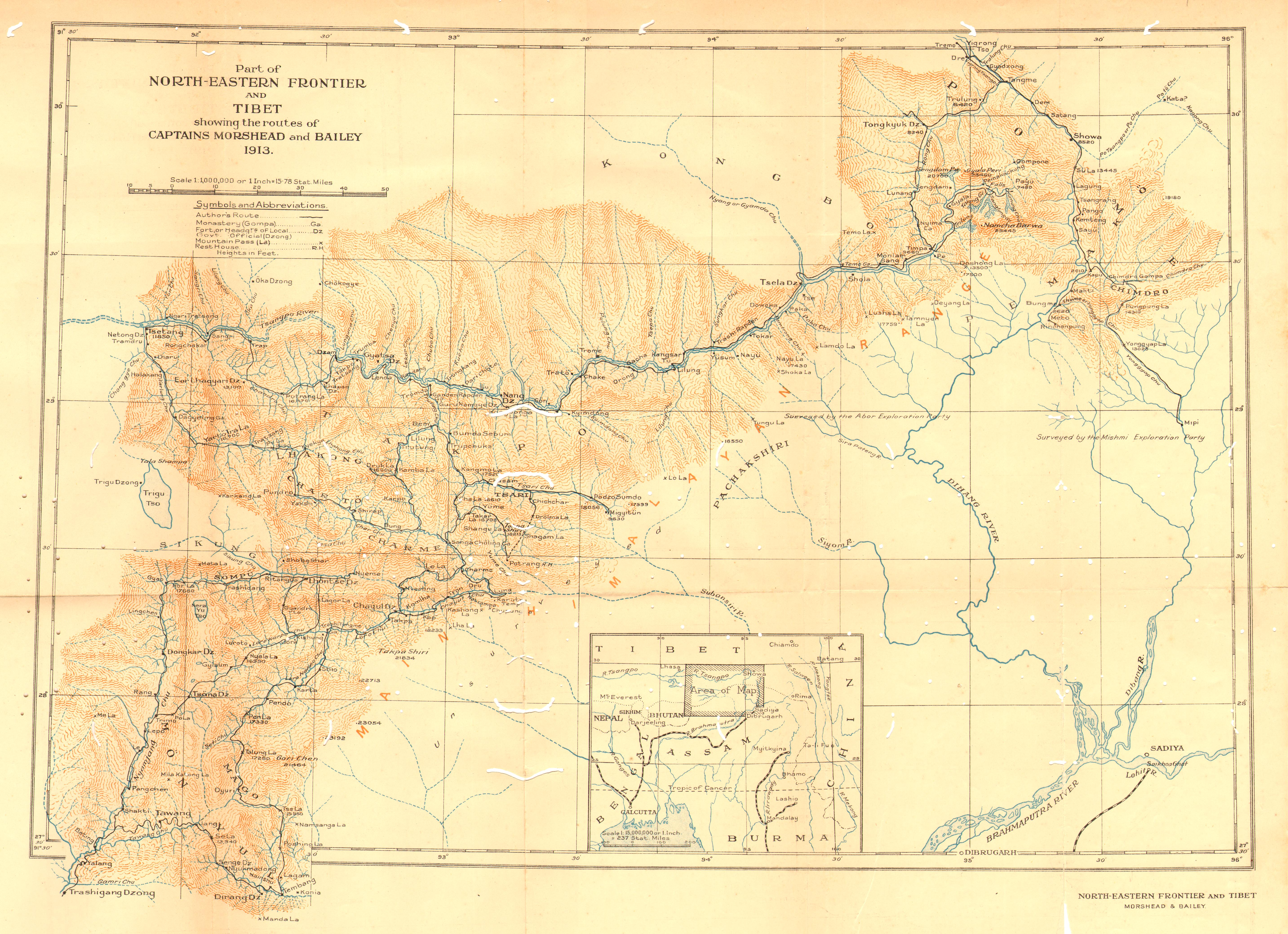
Map of the 1913 expedition to Tibet

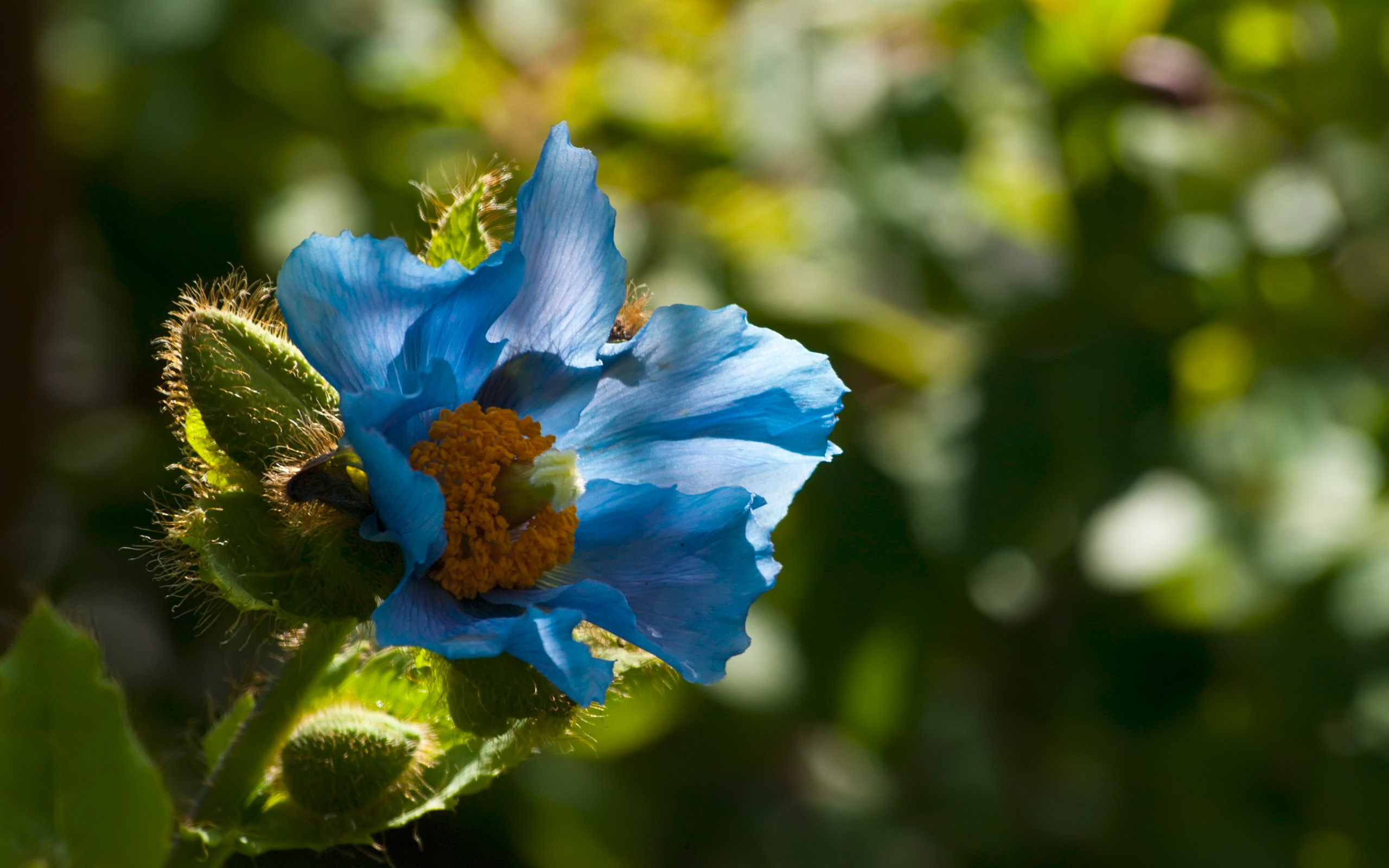
Himalayan Blue Poppy (Meconopsis betonicifolia) (syn. Meconopsis baileyi)

He later travelled in unknown parts of China and Tibet, was elected a Fellow of the Royal Geographical Society in October 1906 (seconded by his father, Colonel F Bailey, who had joined the society in 1880) and eventually earned the Patron's Medal from the Royal Geographical Society for his discoveries. He also contributed notes on big game to the Journal of the Bombay Natural History Society. He was promoted Captain 28 July 1908 and served during the operations in the Abor Country from 1911 to 1912.

Bailey transferred himself from the Indian Army to the Political Department to get appointments on the Tibetan frontier. In 1911, he crossed China and southern Tibet to Assam in a failed attempt to reach the 150 ft falls on the Yarlung Tsangpo, which had been reported by the Indian pundit Kinthup. In 1913 he made an unauthorised exploration to the Tsangpo Gorges with Captain Henry Morshead of the Survey of India. Morshead was later a surveyor for the initial 1921 British Mount Everest reconnaissance expedition, along with George Mallory. Their adventures led them to the Rong Chu Valley, a gorge on the Upper Tsangpo. It was in that valley that Bailey spotted a tall blue poppy at the margin of the forest and pressed it in his notebook, now called Meconopsis baileyi. They reached Kintup's Falls at the monastery of Pemakochung and were greatly disappointed to find the falls to be about 30 ft.

In 1914, Bailey was honoured with the MacGregor Medal for "recces and surveys (with Capt. T.M. Morshead) and separately, Tsangpo valley, Dihang & Dibang valleys,1911- 12."

== First World War ==
On 4 September 1914 Bailey was appointed as a captain with the 6th Reserve Regiment of Cavalry at Dublin. He served on the Western Front in March to April 1915 with the 34th Sikh Pioneers, and he was shot in the arm. He was serving in the Indian Expeditionary Forces as one of the few Urdu-speaking officers on the front. When his wound continued to worsen, he returned to England, but he later joined the fight again at the Battle of Gallipoli in September 1915. He served with the 5th Gurkhas, and he was wounded twice more.

He was appointed a Companion of the Most Eminent Order of the Indian Empire on 1 January 1915 and was transferred to the Supernumerary List on 24 December 1915.

He was sent back to India, where he served as Political Officer on the North-West Frontier during the Mohmand Operations January 1916 to March 1917.

In December 1917, he was sent to South Persia, where he served until February 1918 as a political officer and was then in Chinese and Russian Turkistan from 1918 to 1920.

He was a temporary lieutenant-colonel from 1 April 1918 to 30 May 1920.

== Mission to Tashkent ==
One of Bailey's more well-known adventures occurred in 1918, when he travelled to Tashkent in Central Asia on a mission to discover the intentions of the new Bolshevik government, specifically in relation to India. During the mission, he also shadowed Raja Mahendra Pratap, an Indian nationalist who had established the Provisional Government of India in Kabul in 1915. Pratap was liaising with Germany and Bolshevik authorities for a joint Soviet-German assault into India through Afghanistan. It was then that the first plans for the Soviet Kalmyk Project was first considered. Bailey eventually had to flee for his life from the city and escaped only by taking on the guise of an Austrian prisoner-of-war and joining the Cheka with an assignment to find a rogue British agent, himself. Upon his return to England, he was a national hero. Bailey later recorded his exploits in his book Mission to Tashkent.

== Later life ==
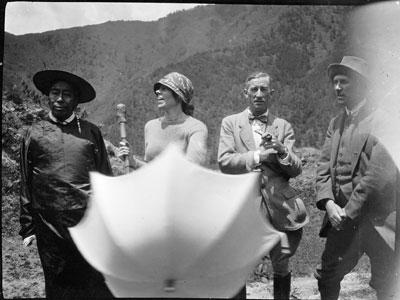
Miru Gyalwa, Mrs Bailey, Major Vance, Colonel Bailey, 1927 in Tibet

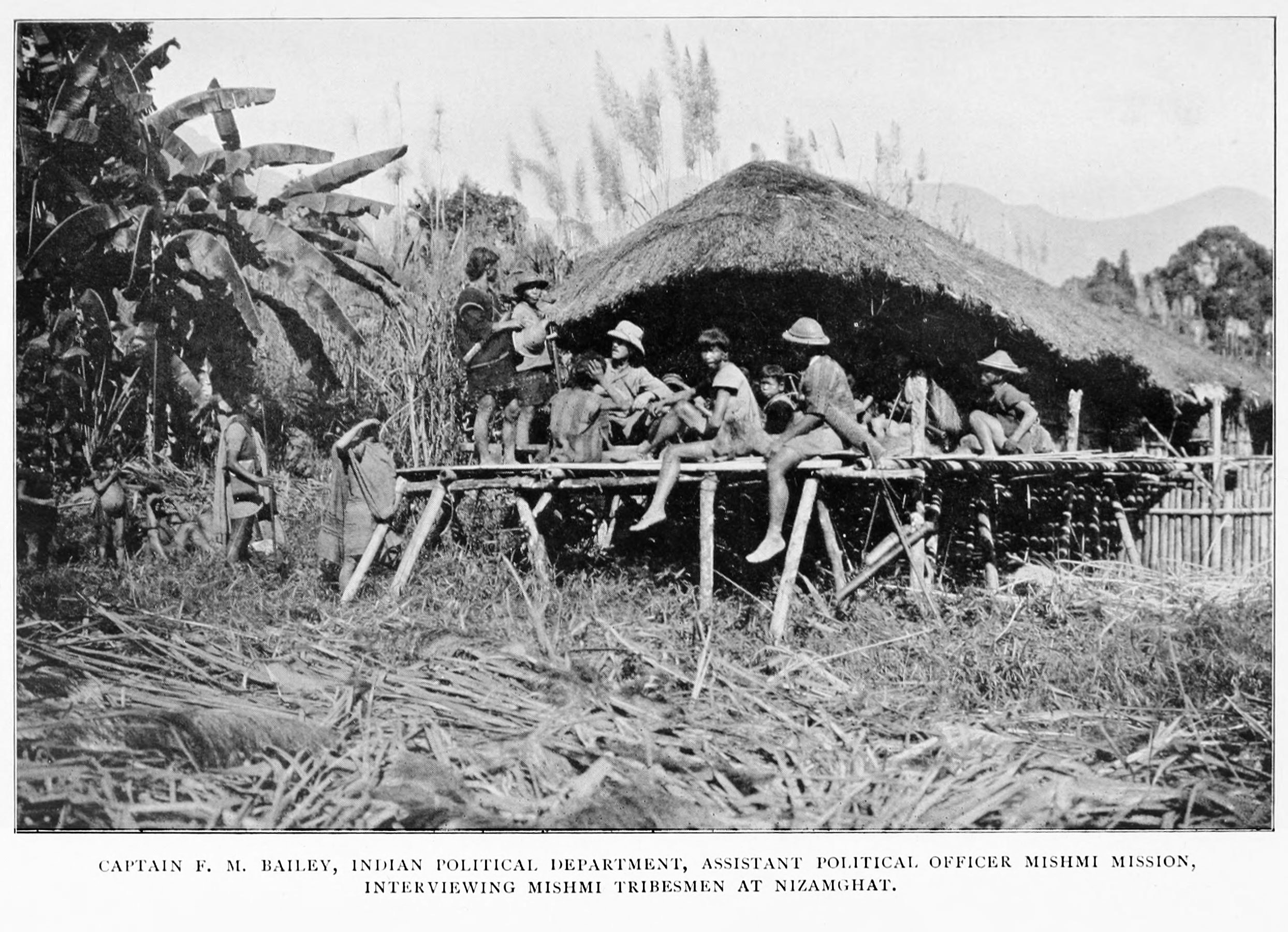
In the Mishmi Hills

In 1921 Bailey married Irma Hepburn, daughter of Baron Cozens-Hardy.

He was the Political Officer for Sikkim and Tibet, stationed in Gangtok (Sikkim) from June 1921 to October 1928, and he made annual visits to Tibet to inspect the Gyantse Trade Agency and visited Lhasa from 16 July to 16 August 1924, accompanied by the Medical Officer, Major J. Hislop IMS.

He helped Frank Kingdon-Ward and Lord Cawdor in 1924 when he was a Political Officer in Gangtok, Sikkim. Bailey arranged passports and encouraged them to search the 40 mi unexplored gap of the river to solve the riddles of the Tsangpo Gorges. Kingdon-Ward wrote a book by the same name documenting that expedition.

He was among the earliest to import the Lhasa Apso breed of dog into Britain. He was in contact with others interested in Central Asia, including Richard Meinertzhagen.

He was promoted to Lieutenant-Colonel 28 July 1926.

He was the Resident at Baroda, Central India from 1930 to 1932 and was the Resident in Kashmir in 1932 to 1933.

In February 1935, he was appointed His Majesty's Envoy Extraordinary and Minister Plenipotentiary at Kathmandu. He held this appointment until retiring in 1938.

He retired from the Indian Army on 3 February 1937 and, during the Second World War, served as a King's Messenger to Central and South America between 1942 and 1943.

Bailey died on 17 April 1967.

== Works ==
- Bailey, F. M. "From the outposts: A quiet day in Tibet", in: Blackwood's Magazine, 181;1144:270-5
- Bailey, F. M. (1914). "Exploration on the Tsangpo or upper Brahmaputra". Scottish Geographical Magazine. 30 (11): 561–582. doi:10.1080/00369221408734154.
- Bailey, F. M. China-Tibet-Assam: A Journey, 1911 (London: Cape, 1945)
- Bailey, F. M. (1946). Mission to Tashkent. London: J. Cape. OCLC 988861242. Republished by Oxford University Press in 1992 and 2002 with Peter Hopkirk as editor.
- Bailey, F. M. No Passport to Tibet (London: Rupert Hart-Davis, 1957)

== Legacy ==
Bailey is commemorated in the scientific names of four species: a Tibetan snake (Thermophis baileyi); a species of mammal, the red goral (Naemorhedus baileyi); the renowned Himalayan blue poppy (Meconopsis baileyi) and a butterfly Bailey's Apollo (Parnassius baileyi).

== See also ==
- London Gazette
- The Times
