= Mission to Tashkent =

1946 memoir by Frederick Marshman Bailey

- Author: Frederick Marshman Bailey
- Language: English
- Genre: Memoir
- Publisher: Jonathan Cape
- Publication date: 1946
- Publication place: United Kingdom
- Media type: Print
- Pages: 312

Mission to Tashkent is a memoir by British spy, explorer, and botanist Frederick Marshman Bailey. The book recounts Bailey's adventures in Turkestan between 1918 and 1920, during which he initially gathered intelligence on Bolshevik intentions as an official representative of the British government before continuing his work as a covert agent. One of the primary objectives of Bailey's mission was to collect information on those resisting British rule in Afghanistan and India, as well as to persuade the Bolsheviks to either continue their war against Germany or, at the very least, refrain from aiding the Central Powers.

Due to the threats posed by Bolshevik persecution, Bailey lost the manuscript at least four times, each time rewriting it from memory. (Note: In a 1999 review, writer Richard Snailham mistakenly states Bailey lost his notes three times.) Although the book was written in the 1920s, British government restrictions delayed its publication until 1946. For the 1992 edition published by Oxford University Press, historian Peter Hopkirk, author of Setting the East Ablaze: Lenin's Dream of an Empire in Asia, wrote the introduction and afterword. In 1999, The Folio Society in London released a deluxe edition, which included many of Bailey's own photographs along with a revised introduction and afterword by Hopkirk, who called Bailey "an absolutely first class man".

== Reception ==
In a 1947 review, Elizabeth Bacon of the University of California praised Bailey's ability to narrate "adventures of an order usually encountered only in fiction". British Army officer Roy C. Firebrace also commended the book for providing valuable insights into life in Turkestan during the early years of the October Revolution. In a 1999 review, writer Richard Snailham praised the book for its "fascinating detail of the heterogeneous people of Turkestan" but criticized its structure as fragmented and nonlinear.

== Censorship in the Soviet Union ==
The book was banned in the Soviet Union. During his travels in the Uzbek SSR in the 1980s, Peter Hopkirk smuggled in two copies of Mission to Tashkent in an effort to retrace Bailey's steps. When a museum worker in Tashkent inquired whether a copy of Bailey's book could be found, Hopkirk handed over one of the copies he had brought with him.
