= William Harvey-Kelly =

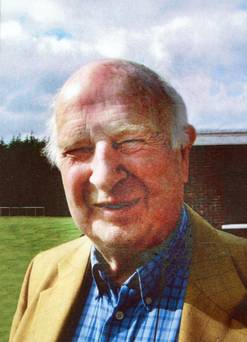
- William Harvey-Kelly
- Born: Charles William David Harvey-Kelly; 4 March 1924
- Died: 11 July 2015; Killucan, County Westmeath, Ireland
- Relatives: Charles Harvey-Kelly (Father); H.D. Harvey-Kelly (uncle)
- Military career
- Allegiance: United Kingdom
- Branch: British Army; Irish Guards
- Service years: 1943–1969
- Rank: Colonel
- Service number: 295072
- Unit: Irish Guards
- Commands: 3rd Battalion Irish Guards 1966 – 1968
- Conflicts: World War II; Market Garden
- Awards: Chevalier of the Order of Leopold II with palm and Croix de Guerre 1940 with palm; MBE

Charles William David Harvey-Kelly (1924–2015) was a British Army soldier, and Colonel of the Irish Guards from 1966 to 1968. During The Troubles in Northern Ireland he worked to promote closer links with the Catholic and Protestant churches. He was awarded the MBE in 1998 for his work with the ex-service community in Ireland.

== Early life ==
William was born in London in 1924 to Charles Harvey-Kelly (Lieutenant Colonel in the Indian Army, Baluch Regiment) and Sybil (medical doctor and daughter of a Liberal MP). His uncle, H.D. Harvey-Kelly, was the first British pilot to land in France in World War I. He was the eldest of five children and spent the first three years of his life in Quetta, India (now in Pakistan). In 1927 the family moved to County Westmeath buying Clonhugh, a house and farm on the shores of Lough Owel near Multyfarnham.

He was originally educated at Castle Park School in Dublin, the Wellington College, Berkshire, eventually studying law at Oxford University.

== Military career ==
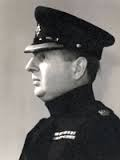
William Harvey-Kelly - Irish Guards

He was commissioned as 2nd Lieutenant in the Irish Guards in October 1943, aged 19, and landed in Normandy a month after the D-Day landings.

During Market Garden, he took out a Panther with a PIAT, "One outstanding feat was performed by William Harvey-Kelly, who marched up to a German tank and, standing beside it, knocked it out with a PIAT, the small British hand-held anti-tank weapon. As a result of his bravery, his Platoon of the Third Battalion overran this key German position and we made several miles of advance. I have always felt it unjust that William, later to command the regiment, was not recommended for the Military Cross. I suspect the sudden departure of Colonel Joe (Col. Joe Vandeleur) to take command of another Brigade was the reason for this."

He was part of the fighting and liberating forces in Belgium and was awarded the Croix de Guerre and the Order of Leopold. Later on in Holland, while fighting at Arnhem at the ‘Bridge too Far’ he was wounded and sent back to Britain, after a short convalescence he returned in 1945 to Germany. He became the Regimental Colonel of the Irish Guards between 1966 and his retirement in 1968, returning to Clonhugh, Ireland, in 1972 to help run the family estate. He was interviewed by Cornelius Ryan for his 1974 book "A Bridge too Far", later made into a film the film of the same name in 1977.

== Later life ==
His voluntary work included his work as Chairman of the Southern Irish branch of the Irish Guards Association, from 1979 to 2000, the President of the Soldiers, Sailors, Air Force Association, SSAFA, Chairman of the War Pensions Committee for the Republic of Ireland and fundraising for the British Legion on Remembrance Day. Much of this work was not widely advertised at the time because of The Troubles, but in 1998 he was awarded the MBE for services to the ex service community in the Republic of Ireland.

The culmination of his work was the visit to Dublin in 2011 of Queen Elizabeth when the Republic recognised the Irish soldiers who had fought and died in both World Wars. William was interviewed on RTÉ wearing his medals and sitting in his wheelchair, telling reporters that he felt her visit was a sign that the rift between the two countries was healing and that the Queen's visit was something he had not expected in his lifetime.

Col. William Harvey Kelly died at St Camillus nursing home on 11 July 2015.
