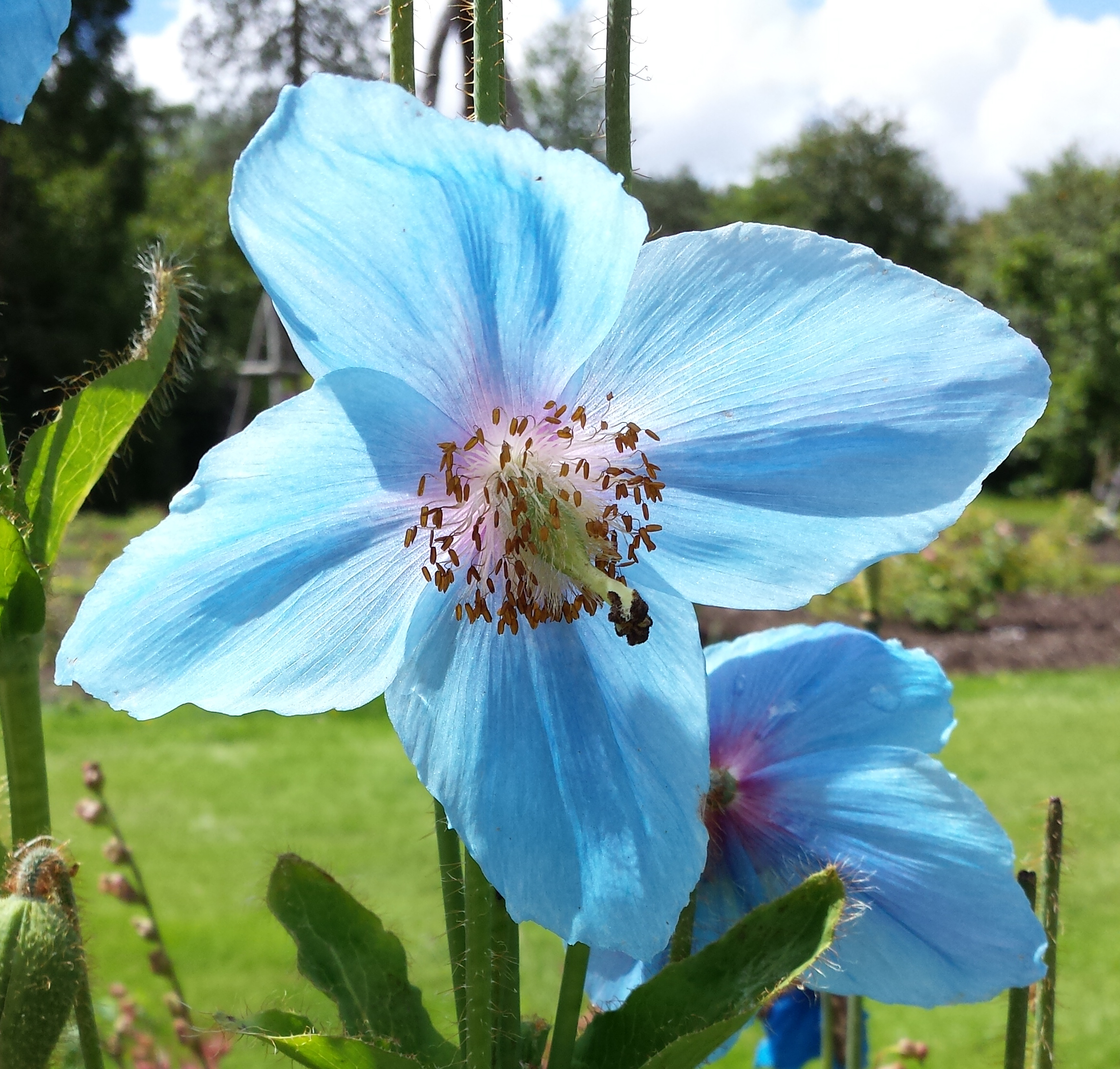

Scientific classification
- Kingdom: Plantae
- Clade: Tracheophytes
- Clade: Angiosperms
- Clade: Eudicots
- Order: Ranunculales
- Family: Papaveraceae
- Genus: Meconopsis
- Species: M. betonicifolia

Binomial name
- Meconopsis betonicifolia Franch.

Synonyms
- Meconopsis baileyi

= Meconopsis betonicifolia =

Species of flowering plant in the poppy family

Meconopsis betonicifolia (syn. Meconopsis baileyi), the Himalayan blue poppy, is a species of flowering plant in the family Papaveraceae with large blue flowers.

== Description ==
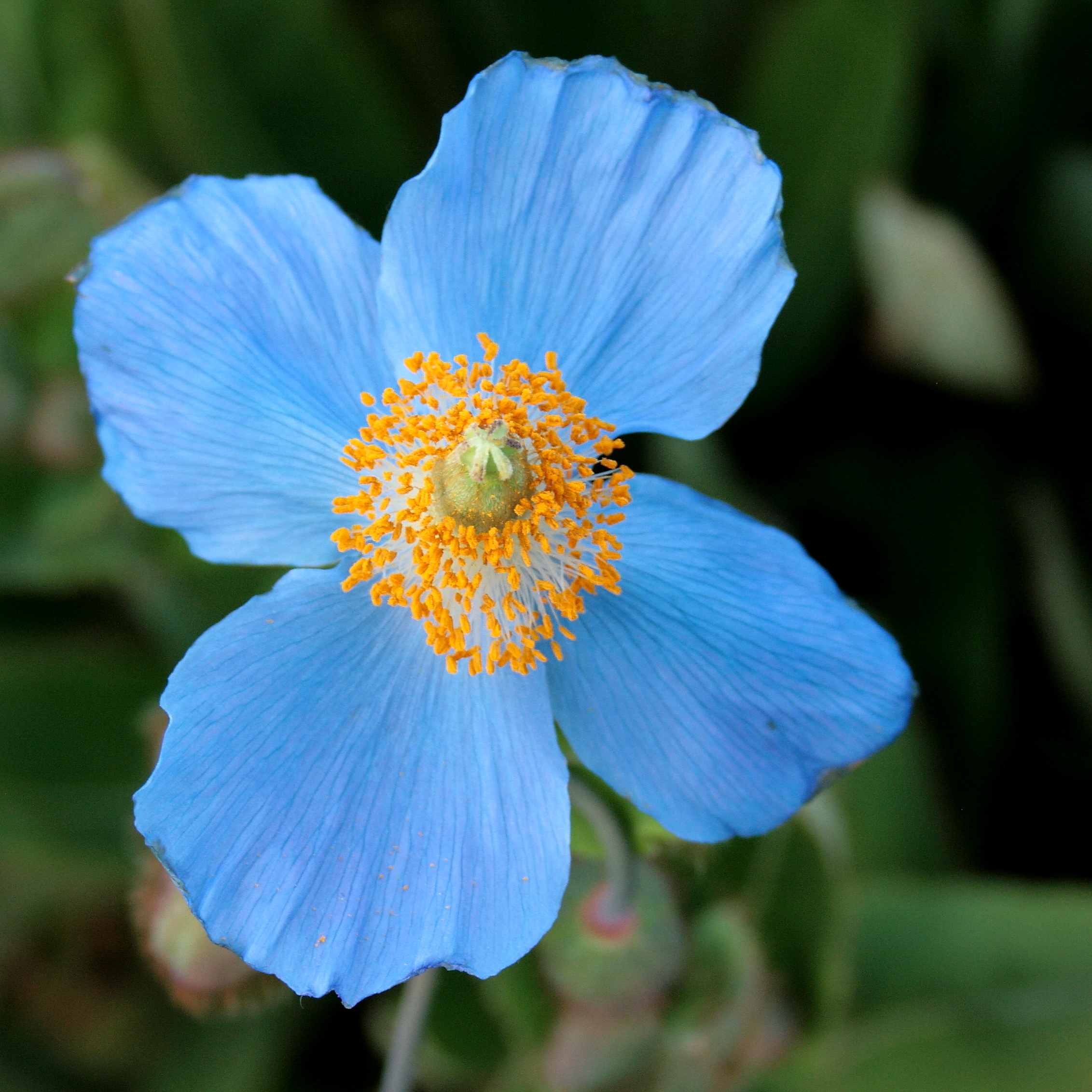
Meconopsis betonicifolia

This herbaceous perennial is often short-lived. The plant's life cycle spans two to three years, with flowering occurring in the second or third year after seed germination. The hermaphroditic flowers bloom from late spring to early summer, attracting pollinators such as bees and butterflies, which are crucial for cross-pollination and genetic diversity. Followed by wind-dispersal, the seeds can remain viable for several years.

The flower's distinctive blue color results from various pigments influenced by soil pH and UV light exposure.

== Taxonomy ==
The species was first formally named for western science in 1912 by the British officer Lt. Col. Frederick Marshman Bailey.

== Distribution and habitat ==
Meconopsis betonicifolia is a rare flower found in the Himalayan regions of Nepal, Tibet, and Myanmar at elevations of 2,000 to 5,000 meters (6,600 to 16,400 ft). It thrives in slightly alkaline to acidic soils in cool, moist environments.

Blue poppies have been introduced to gardens for their beauty; however, due to overexploitation, they are becoming scarce in the wild. It is hardy in most of the United Kingdom.
