= Rana Chhina =

Squadron Leader Rana Tej Pratap Singh Chhina
- Born: 1960 (age 65–66); Delhi, India
- Military career
- Allegiance: India
- Branch: Indian Air Force
- Service years: 1981–1997
- Rank: Squadron leader
- Service number: 16389
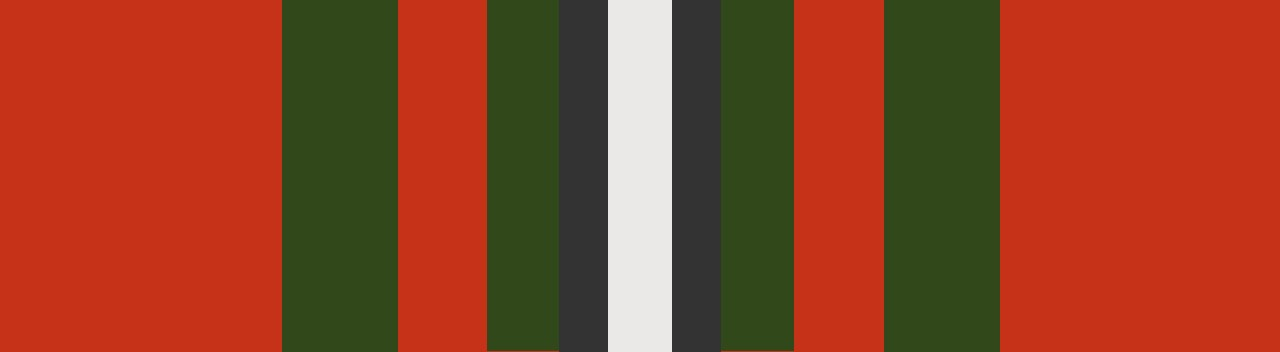
- Awards: MacGregor Medal Member of the Order of the British Empire Officer of the Order of Leopold
- Other work: Military historian

Squadron Leader Rana Tej Pratap Singh Chhina, (born 1960) is a writer, a military historian and a veteran of the Indian Air Force.

== Military career ==
Born and raised in New Delhi, Chhina was selected for the National Defence Academy in 1976, shortly after graduating from St. Columba's School. He was commissioned into the flying branch of the Indian Air Force (IAF) as a pilot officer on 11 June 1981. He served with distinction as a helicopter pilot in all sectors in which the IAF was operational. From 1990 to 1993 he was an IAF flight instructor.

== Military historian ==
After retiring from active service in 1997 as a squadron leader, Chhina became a historian of the IAF, the former British Indian Army, and Indian military medals and decorations.

Chhina is the secretary and editor at the United Service Institution of India (USI) Centre for Armed Forces Historical Research, New Delhi, and is the vice-president of the Indian Military Historical Society (IMHS), UK. He is also a member of the IAF Aerospace Museum Apex Steering Committee and the Government of India's Archival Advisory Board, and was a member of the joint USI–MEA (Ministry of External Affairs) Steering Committee responsible for coordinating international and national commemoration of India's participation in the First World War in connection with the centenary of the conflict. In 2016 Chhina was awarded an Honorary Member of the Order of the British Empire for services to First World War centenary commemorations.

== Books ==
=== As author ===
- The Indian Distinguished Service Medal (2001)
- The Eagle Strikes (2006)
- The Indian Army: An Illustrated Overview (2007)
- Medals and decorations of independent India (2008)
- Indian Order of Merit (with Cliff Parrett, of the Indian Military Historical Society (IMHS)) (2010)
- India And The First World War 1914-1918 (2014)
- Last Post Indian War Memorials Around the World(2014) ISBN 978-81-902097-9-3
- India in Flanders Fields (co-author) (2017)

=== As editor ===
- For the honour of India: a history of Indian peacekeeping, by Lieutenant General Satish Nambiar (2009)
