= Charles MacGregor =

British explorer, geographer and British Indian Army officer

Major General Sir Charles MacGregor KCB CSI CIE
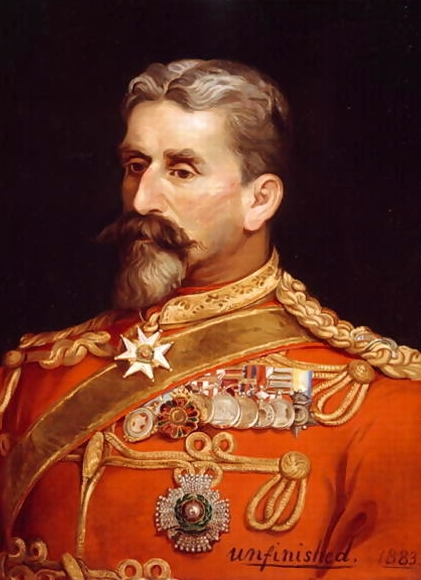
- Born: 12 August 1840; Agra, North-Western Provinces, Company's India
- Died: 5 February 1887 (aged 46)
- Spouse(s): Frances Mary Durand; Charlotte Mary Jardine
- Military career
- Allegiance: United Kingdom
- Branch: Bengal Army
- Rank: Major General
- Conflicts: Siege of Lucknow; Battle of Magdala; Battle of Kandahar

Major General Sir Charles Metcalfe MacGregor KCB CSI CIE (12 August 12, 1840 – 5 February 1887) was a British explorer, geographer and officer of the British Indian Army. He was the Quartermaster General for the British Army in India and the head of the Intelligence Department for the British Indian Army, and he served under Frederick Roberts in the Second Anglo-Afghan War. The MacGregor Medal is awarded in his honour.

== Biography ==
Of Scottish descent, MacGregor was born in Agra, India, the son of Major Robert Guthrie MacGregor of the Bengal Artillery. His grandfather was Major-General James MacGregor of the Bengal Cavalry. MacGregor was schooled at Marlborough College before returning to India at the age of 16 to join the Bengal Army. Arriving just in time for the Indian Rebellion of 1857, MacGregor fought in a number of actions, including at Lucknow and was wounded twice.

MacGregor earned successive promotions whilst serving variously in campaigns in China, the Bhutan War (where he became the deputy assistant Quartermaster General) and Abyssinia including at the Battle of Magdala. In the Second Afghan War MacGregor served as Quartermaster General on the Khyber communication lines and commanded the 3rd Brigade of the Kabul-Kandahar field force at the Battle of Kandahar. In the second phase of the Second Afghan War he became Commander Stewart's and Earl Roberts' chief of staff. After the Second Afghan War, training of men in intelligence gathering became the responsibility of the Quartermaster General and MacGregor served in this role for the East Indies until 1885.

In 1870, MacGregor founded the United Service Institution of India for the "furtherance of interest and knowledge in the art, science and literature of the Defence Services." The Institution awards the MacGregor Medal, founded in his memory, in recognition of valuable contributions to military intelligence that are of defensive importance to India.

MacGregor's The Defence of India (1884) attempted to alert the British public to the geo-strategic importance of India, and the threat posed to British interests by Russia.

MacGregor was appointed Knight Commander of the Order of the Bath, Companion of the Order of the Star of India and Companion of the Order of the Indian Empire). He was promoted to major general weeks before his death on 5 February 1887.

There is a memorial to him in St Paul's Cathedral.

== Family ==
In 1869, he married Frances Mary, daughter of Sir Henry Marion Durand; she died on 9 May 1873; they had one daughter. In February 1883, he married Charlotte Mary Jardine.

== Works ==
- Narrative of a journey through the province of Khorassan and on the n.w. frontier of Afghanistan in 1875, 1879
- Wanderings in Balochistan, 1882
- The defence of India: a strategical study, 1884

== See also ==
- Rana Chhina
