= Indian Military Historical Society =

The Indian Military Historical Society (IMHS) was an organisation and learned society formed in 1983 to bring together those interested in the military history of the Indian Subcontinent and to encourage research and the exchange of information. Their research covered a broad spectrum ranging from aspects of general military history, to specific battles or campaigns, to the history of service units engaged in India, including details of uniforms, medals, badges, buttons and other militaria. It was based primarily in the United Kingdom, but with a wide membership extending to the British Commonwealth and several other countries around the world. The IMHS merged into the MHS in 2020 and a digitised copy of the entire run of Durbar, their quarterly publication, is fully searchable through the MHS website, with a limited stock of back numbers also available.

== Committee members ==
The Society's principal officers were:

- President - Sir John Chapple
- Vice-Presidents - Rana Chhina and John P. Randle
- Secretary - Chris Kempton
- Editor - Barrow Renfrew
- Treasurer - Paul Murphy
