= Sher Jang =

- Born: Sher Jang; 15 March 1870; Punjab, British India
- Died: Unknown; Attock District, Punjab, Pakistan
- Military career
- Allegiance: British India
- Branch: Indian Army
- Service years: 1887-1925
- Unit: Coke's Rifles
- Conflicts: British expedition to Tibet; World War I
- Awards: MacGregor Medal; Kaisar-i-Hind Medal; Order of the Lion and the Sun
- Other work: Survey of India

Khan Bahadur Sher Jang was a soldier-surveyor in the British Indian Army. He was born at Dhok Aziz near Chhab, a small village in Attock District, British India. His father, Aziz Khan belonged to the Khattak tribe.

== Service ==
Khan Bahadur Sher Jang joined Coke's Rifles in 1887 and took part in the 1st and 2nd Miranzai Expeditions of 1890-91 and accompanied the Kurram Column in 1892-93. He joined the Survey of India as a Soldier-Surveyor in 1895. From 1895 to 1899 he served on the N.W.Frontier, taking part on the Waziristan Expedition of 1894-95, in the Tochi, Tirah and Mohmand Expeditions of 1897-98, and in Dir and Chitral in 1899, when he was granted the title of Khan Sahib. In 1901-02 he was attached to the Abyssinian Boundary Commission and was awarded the title of Khan Bahadur at the early age of 32. In 1903-04 he accompanied the Tibet Mission, being mentioned in dispatches, and in 1905-06 served under the Foreign Department in the Persian Gulf.

He was employed on the Baluchistan-Afghan frontier in 1909 and with the Afghan Mission in 1910, when he was awarded the McGregor Memorial Medal. He served with the Abor Expedition in 1911-12, when he was again mentioned in dispatches, and with the Turco-Persia Boundary Commission in 1913-14, for which he was awarded decorations by the Persian and Turkish Governments.

When the Great War broke out in 1914, Khan Bahadur Sher Jang was engaged on survey work with this Commission in the neighbourhood of Urumieh. He brought his companion back through Persia by way of Mianeh, Tehran, Qum, Isfahan and Sheraz to Bushire.

In 1917-18 he served in Waziristan and on the Mahsud frontier, and towards the end of 1918 proceeded again to Mesopotamia. He was now employed under the Political authorities on an important diplomatic mission, owing to his intimate knowledge of conditions in Persian Kurdistan.

During this rebellion, Sher Jang served as a political officer in the Sulaimani area. In 1920-21 he was appointed representative of Iraq in the resettlement of the Iraq-Persian frontier. His work in this connection was highly appreciated by the Right Hon. Sir Winston Churchill, Secretary of State for the Colonies, in his dispatch dated 21 September 1921. He returned to Persia in 1923 with a detachment of the Survey of India which was employed in survey work for the Anglo-Persian Oil Company.

== Honours ==
He was promoted to the Upper Subordinate Service on 1 August 1909. He is in possession of 12 war medals and decorations with 8 clasps; he has been awarded honoraria for his service on several occasions, and has received an assignment of land revenue from the Government of India. In 1902 the Royal Geographical Society awarded him a Sword of Honour (the Black Memorial) in recognition of his valuable services to geography, and in 1916 he was awarded the Kaisar-i-Hind medal (2nd Class). During the visit of H.R.H. the Prince of Wales to India in 1922, Sher Jang had the honour of being personally presented to His Royal Highness, who evinced a keen interest in his services.

== Social service ==
There was also another fine side of his character which was only realised by those who knew him well, namely for his compassion for the weak. When he was on sick leave at the end of 1918, the virulent epidemic of influenza was ravaging the homes in his country. Sher Jang devoted his three months' hard-earned rest to nursing the sick and burying the dead; and he is recorded in a letter than he "regarded this duty greater than his active service". On another occasion, in Urmia in 1919, when he was by no means in a pleasant situation himself, he exercised all his personal influence in urging the protection of the hapless Christian women and children, whose lives were at times threatened by the Kurds.

== Retirement ==
He retired from survey of India on 15 June 1925. Sher Jang returned to his home, after being employed almost continuously during his service of over 30 years in the Department either on or beyond the Frontiers on India.
