= Frederick Bailey (forester) =

British army officer and forester (1840–1912)

Frederick Bailey FRSE FRSGS (11 July 1840 – 21 December 1912) was a British Army officer serving in the Royal Engineers who headed the Indian Imperial Forestry Service, in charge of overseeing the cultivation and export of timber to the British Empire.

== Life ==
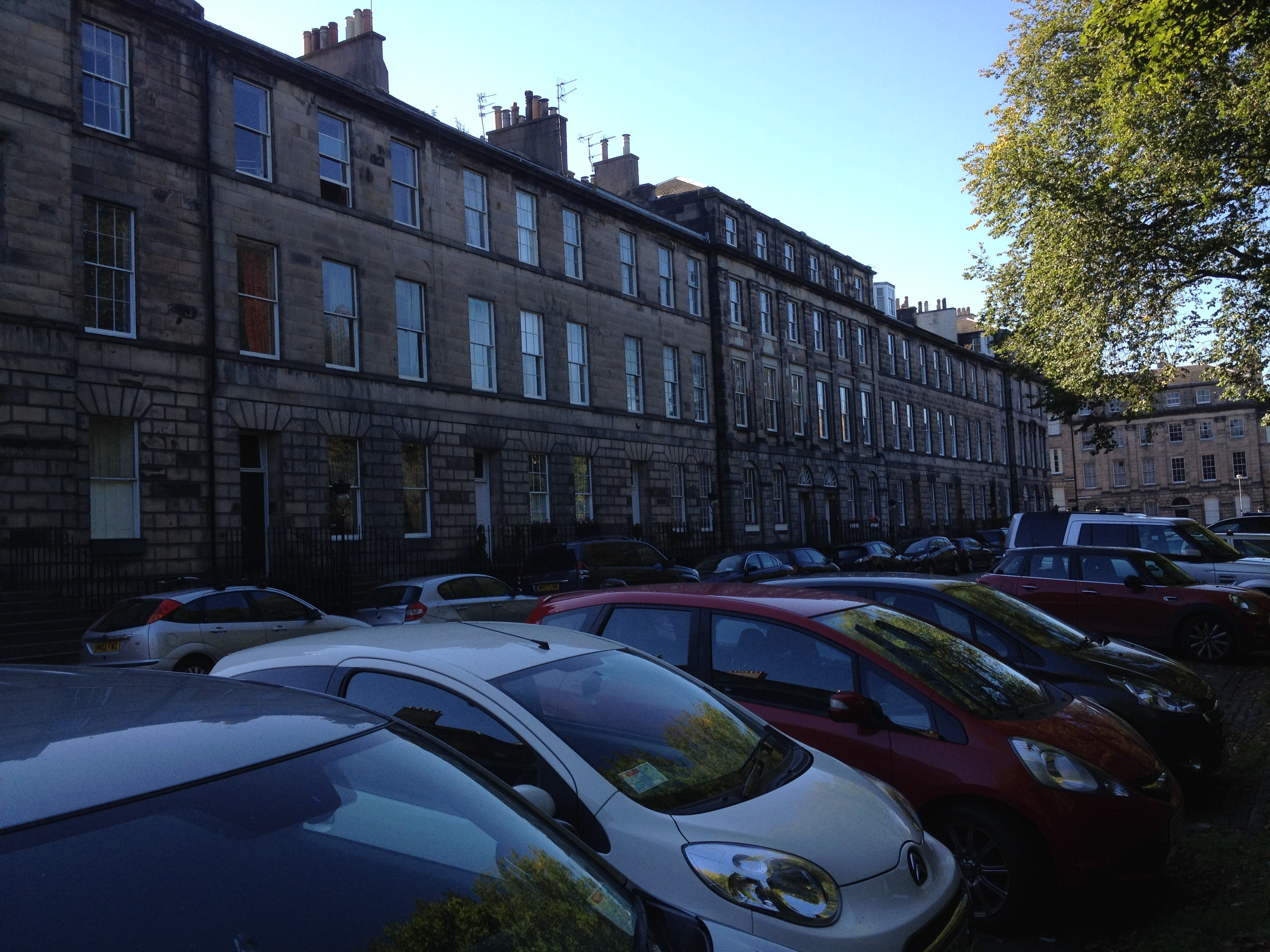
Drummond Place, Edinburgh

He was born around 1842 the son of Catherine Irvine and her husband, Charles Bailey (1803–1865), the son of Charles Bailey, twice Mayor of Bedford.

He was commissioned into the Royal Engineers in 1859. In 1871 he joined the Indian Forest Service and became Head of this service and Inspector General of Forests in India, succeeding Hugh Cleghorn in this task. In this service he was based in Lahore. In 1878 he established the First Indian Forestry School at Dehra Dun and served as its first director. In 1890 he returned to UK and lectured on a newly created course on Forestry at the University of Edinburgh from 1890 to 1907.

In 1894 he was elected a Fellow of the Royal Society of Edinburgh. His proposers were James Geikie, Alexander Crum Brown, Sir William Turner and Peter Guthrie Tait

From 1895, until his death, he lived at 7 Drummond Place in the New Town of Edinburgh.

He and his wife visited his son in Tibet around 1902.

He died on 21 December 1912.

== Family ==
He married Florence Agnes Marshman (b.1847) in Simla in 1879 and they were parents of Frederick Marshman Bailey.
