= United Service Institution =

Indian think tank

United Service Institution of India
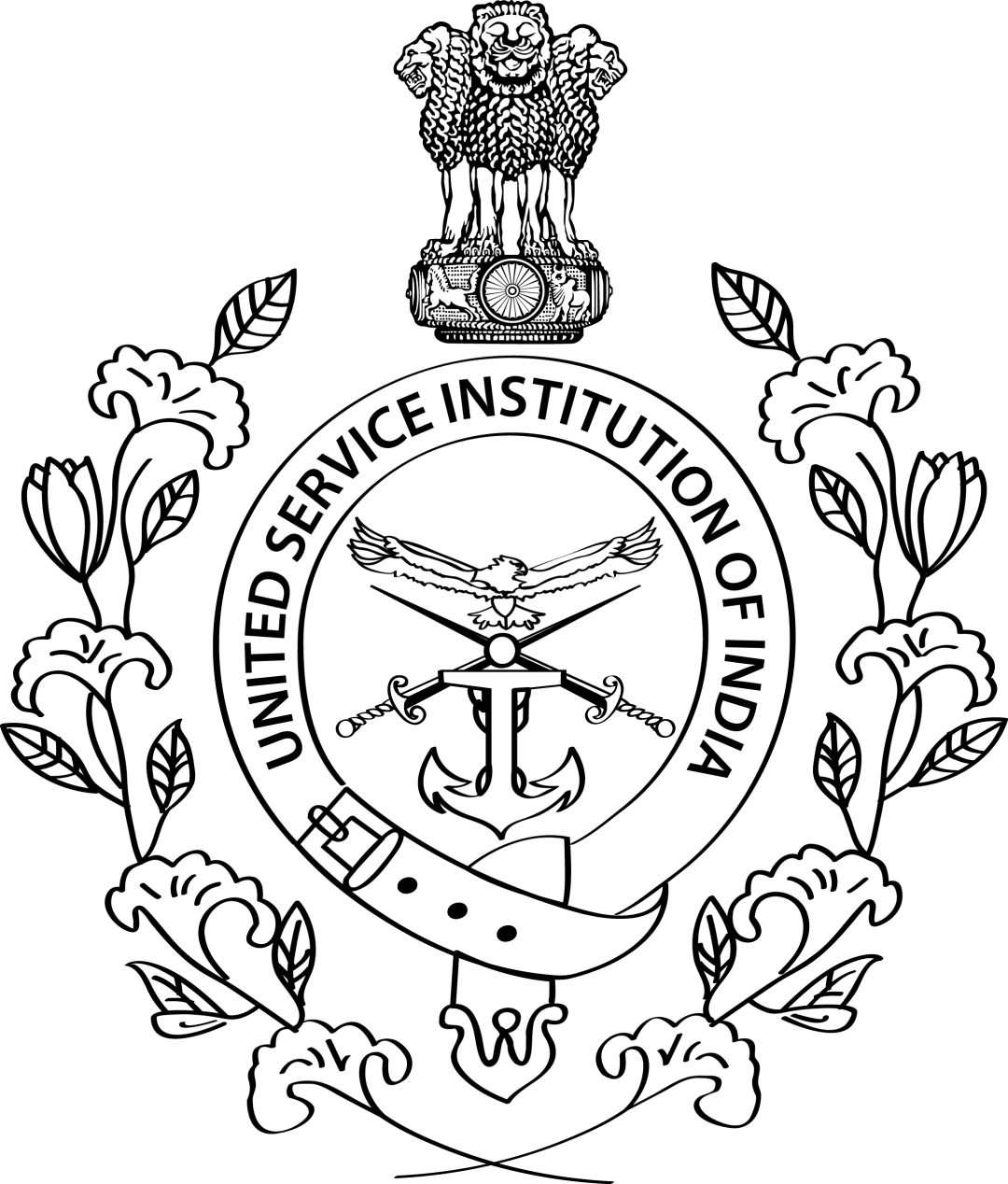
- Insignia of USI
- Abbreviation: USI
- Formation: 1870; 156 years ago
- Founder: Sir Charles MacGregor
- Location: New Delhi, India
- Director: Vice Admiral Sanjay Jasjit Singh SYSM PVSM AVSM NM
- Website: www.usiofindia.org

United Service Institution of India (USI) is a national security and defence services think tank based in New Delhi, India. It describes its aim as the "furtherance of interest and knowledge in the art, science and literature of the defence services".

USI operates centres for research in various areas of national security. The USI Journal, published quarterly since 1872, is the oldest defence journal in Asia. It also publishes a number of monographs based on research and study by its members.

== History ==
The United Service Institution was established in 1870 by Major General Sir Charles MacGregor in Shimla. It was founded as a society in the furtherance of interest and knowledge in the art, science and literature of the Defence Services. The institute was initially housed in the Old Town Hall, and later received temporary accommodation in the Indian Army Headquarters, which was also then based in Shimla.

In 1908, the institute acquired its own premises near Combermere Post Office in Shimla Hills. Among the distinguished officers who have served as its secretary, was Field Marshal William Joseph Slim in the 1930s.

After independence and the subsequent partition of India, the institute attempted to continue as a joint institution for both countries as the United Service Institution of India and Pakistan. The four 1948 issues of the institute's journal were published jointly. However, following the Indo-Pakistani War of 1947, cross-border relations were interrupted and the institute has since been known as the United Service Institution of India.

Following independence, the institute went through financially testing times. It had to sell its Shimla headquarters. In 1953, the institute relocated to New Delhi. The institute survived primarily due to the efforts of Colonel (Retd.) Pyara Lal, its secretary from 1957 to 1987. The institute operated in New Delhi from Kashmir House until 1996. The foundation stone for its current headquarters in Vasant Vihar, New Delhi, was laid on 26 April 1993, and the institute was relocated in 1996.

== Activities ==
USI operates two centres of research and one centre for coaching predominantly Indian Army and limited Indian Naval officers for Professional Military Education exams.

=== Centre for Strategic Studies and Simulation ===
The Centre for Strategic Studies and Simulation (CS3) is focused on conducting research and analyses on national and international security issues. It leverages gaming and simulation of strategic scenarios, to explore options for wider discussion and consideration.

=== Centre for Armed Forces Historical Research ===
The Centre for Armed Forces Historical Research (CAFHR) studies the history of Indian Armed Forces. It focuses on diverse aspects of the services policies and practices—strategic, tactical, logistical, organisational, socio-economic. CAFHR is organized into four research groups focusing on different periods of Indian history—that before 1750, from 1750 to 1900, 1900 to 1947 and post-1947. The centre also does consulting, script writing and guidance for movies and documentaries related to Military History.

Courses Section (Coaching for Professional Military Education)

== Colonel Pyara Lal Memorial Library ==
The Colonel Pyara Lal Memorial Library (Information Resource Centre) of the United Service Institution of India (USI) is a specialized research library focusing on defense studies, strategic affairs, warfare, conflict and peace studies, the United Nations, international relations, diplomacy, area studies, national and international security, insurgency and terrorism, nuclear issues, history, and biography. The library supports education, research, and training for its members by acquiring, preserving, and providing access to books, manuscripts, and other print and non-print materials.

Keeping in view the convenience of its patrons, the library is located on the ground floor of United Service Institution of India, New Delhi and is air-conditioned.

The library has computerised its activities, processes, products and services for the benefit of users to facilitate fast access to the information held in the library and to promote the evolution of library use, and increasing availability of library resources to its members.

== Publications ==
Some of the famous books and monographs published by the institution are:

- A Talent for War: The Military Biography of Lt Gen Sagat Singh (2013), Maj Gen Randhir Sinh (Retd), Vij Books India / United Service Institution of India, ISBN 978-93-82652-23-6. A military biography of Lt Gen Sagat Singh.
- China and India: A Comparative Analysis of Approaches to Energy Security by Prashant Agrawal
- China's Asia-Pacific Strategy and India by Narendra Kumar Tripathi
- China's Maritime Ambitions and the PLA Navy by Sandeep Dewan (foreword by Srikant Kondapalli)
- China's Quest for Global Dominance:Reality or Myth by Ed PJS Sandhu (Retd)
- Coastal Security- Maritime Dimensions of India's Homeland Security by Prof K R Singh
- Countering Insurgencies in India — An Insiders View by E M Rammohan, IPS (Retd)
- Countering Transnational Terrorism by Brig Rahul K Bhonsle(Retd)
- Counterinsurgency and Quest for Peace by Col Anil Athale (Retd)
- Echoes from Beyond the Banihal-Kashmir : Human Rights and Armed Forces by Sujata Kanungo
- India Bangladesh Relations: The Way Ahead by Lt Gen Y M Bammi(Retd)
- Iran's Relations with Pakistan: A Strategic Analysis by Dr. Satyanarayan Pattanayak
- Left Wing Extremism: Assessment and Counter Insurgency Strategy by Col Akshaya Handa
- Maoist Insurgency and India's Internal Security by EN Rammohan, Amrit Pal Singh, AK Agarwal
- Minerals, Market and Maritime Strategy by Cmde Sujeet Samaddar
- Multi-Vector Policies of Central Asian Nations and India by Brig Vinod Anand (Retd)
- National Security Challenges for India in the Next Decade — Conflicts in North East
- Pak Af Equation and Future of Afghanistan by Brig Vinod Ana nd (Retd)
- Peace and Stability in Afghanistan: The Way Ahead by Ed: Maj Gen Y K Gera (Retd)
- Peace and Stability in Asia-Pacific Region — Assessment of the Security Architecture Architecture by Maj Gen Y K Gera
- Possibility of a Nuclear War in Asia- An Indian Perspective by Col G G Pamidi
- Reorganising the Air Force for Future Operations by AVM A K Tiwary, VSM
- Rising China: Opportunity or Strategic Challenge by Maj Gen P J S Sandhu (Retd)
- Strategies for Countering Non State Actors in South Asia by Ed Maj Gen PJS Sandhu
- Stress, Suicide and Fratricides in the Armyby Maj Gen Samay Ram (Retd)
- Suicide Terrorism: Relevance in Indian Context by Lt Col Behram A Sahukar
- The Implacable Taliban, Repeating History in Afghanistan by E N Rammohan
- The Indian Armed Forces: Socio Legal Perspective by Wg Cdr U C Jha (Retd)
- The Invisible Wall of China by Mohit Nayal
- Transformation of the Indian Armed Forces 2025- Enhancing India's Defence by Maj Gen A K Lal (retd)
- Water Issues in Sino- Indian & Indo — Pak Relations by Narender Kumar Tripathi

== See also ==
- MacGregor Medal
- Centre for Land Warfare Studies
- Centre for Air Power Studies (India)
- Democracy in India
- Election Commission of India
- Institute for Defence Studies and Analyses
- List of think tanks in India
