= H. D. Harvey-Kelly =

British Army officer and military aviator (1891–1917)

H.D. Harvey-Kelly
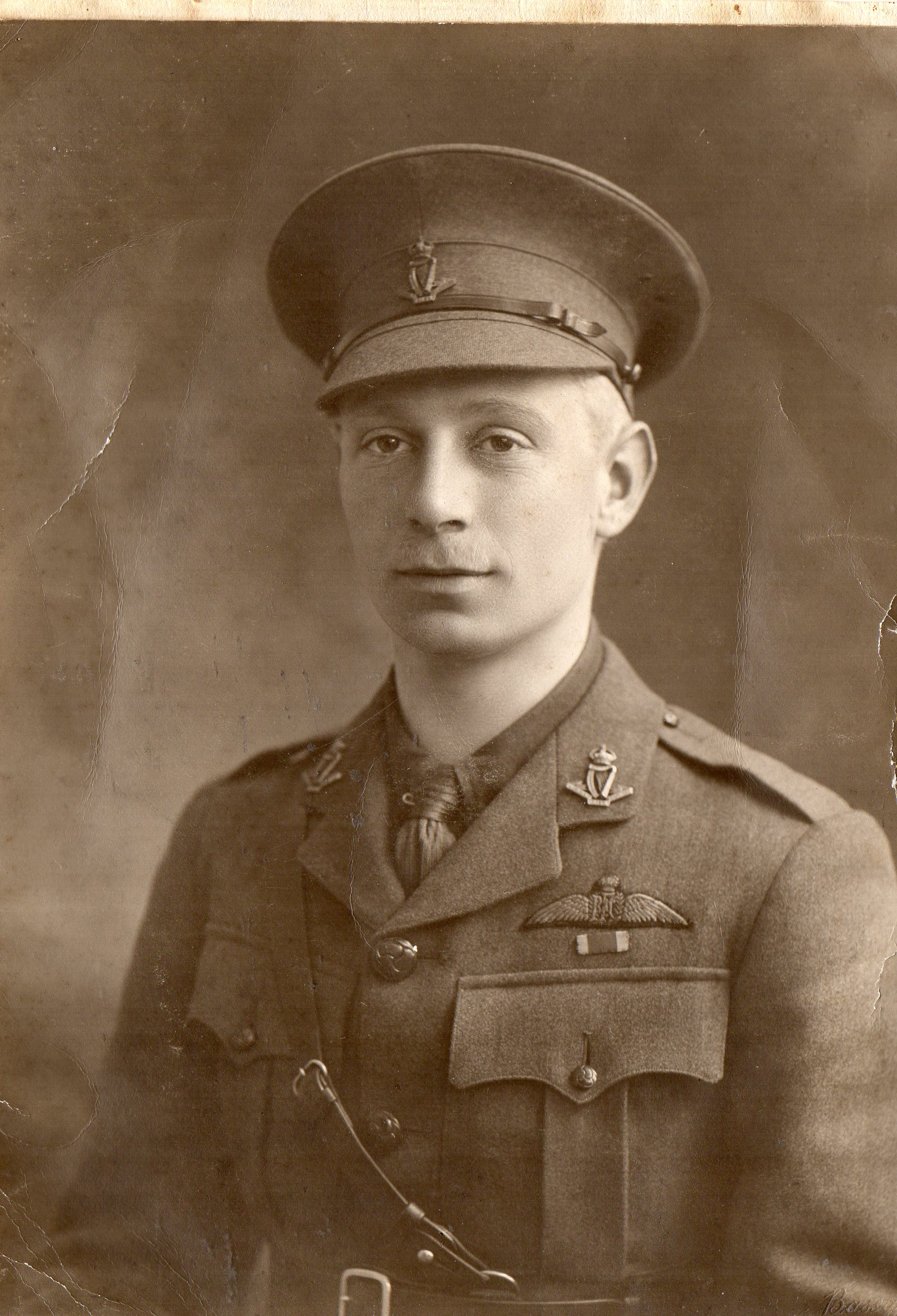
- Born: 9 February 1891; Teignmouth, Devon, England
- Died: 29 April 1917 (aged 26); Near Arras, France
- Relatives: Charles Harvey-Kelly (brother); Lionel Dunsterville (uncle)
- Military career
- Allegiance: United Kingdom
- Branch: British Army; Royal Flying Corps
- Service years: 1908–1917
- Rank: Major
- Nickname: "Bay"
- Units: No. 2 Squadron RFC; Royal Irish Regiment
- Commands: No. 19 Squadron RFC; No. 56 Squadron RFC
- Conflicts: First World War: Western Front; Nivelle Offensive; Battle of Arras; Bloody April (DOW)
- Awards: Distinguished Service Order; Mentioned in dispatches

Hubert Dunsterville Harvey-Kelly, DSO (9 February 1891 – 29 April 1917) was a British Army officer and military aviator. During the First World War, he was credited with being the first Royal Flying Corps (RFC) pilot to land in France, and of being the first RFC pilot to down an enemy aircraft. He was eventually shot down during Bloody April and died of head wounds in a German hospital.

The aircraft he flew while a lieutenant, the Royal Aircraft Factory B.E.2, along with a plaque, hangs in the main hall of the Imperial War Museum in London.

== Early life ==
Bay was the son of Colonel H.H. Harvey-Kelly (Indian Army), and nephew of General Lionel Dunsterville. Although the Harvey-Kelly family were from County Westmeath, Ireland, H.D. was born in Devon and lived a while at Berry Pomeroy, the Dunsterville family home in Devon. He attended Bedford Modern School with his brother Charles Hamilton Grant Hume Harvey-Kelly.

On leaving Sandhurst, he applied to the Royal Irish Regiment, joining them on 5 October 1910 and being commissioned on 23 October 1910. He gained his Royal Aero Club aviation certificate No.501 on 30 May 1913 in a Maurice Farman Biplane at the Central Flying School, Upavon. He was commissioned into the RFC Reserve on 14 August 1913 before joining No2 Squadron based in Montrose, Scotland, a new base set up to patrol the North Sea and protect the fleet.

== Early war ==
HD Harvey-Kelly. Taken 1913

Lieutenant H D Harvey-Kelly seen resting by the haystack, was the first British pilot to land in France after the outbreak of war

At the outbreak of the First World War, 'Bay' was with No. 2 Squadron RFC. They were ordered to cross the channel into France. He flew a Royal Aircraft Factory B.E.2 from Montrose in Scotland and a photograph of his aircraft, with him lying next to a haystack smoking a cigarette, is in the main Hall of the Imperial War Museum in London. It reads "Lieutenant H D Harvey-Kelly, the first British pilot to land in France after the declaration of war, rests his BE2A near Whitby, Yorkshire, in August 1914, during a stop in a flight south from Montrose".

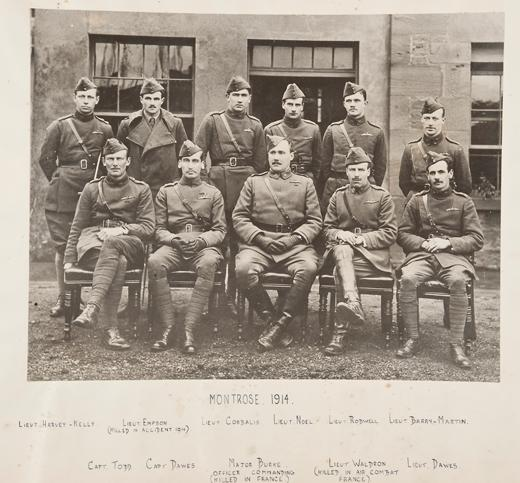
No2 Squadron RFC, Harvey-Kelly top left

Although his squadron took off from Montrose on 3 August for Farnborough they were scattered by bad weather and Lt Harvey-Kelly damaged the undercarriage of his BE2a (347) whilst landing at Kettering. He abandoned his aircraft and was assigned BE2a (471) from the central flying school, eventually arriving in Dover 9 August 1914.

His historic flight was on 13 August 1914 from Dover, England, United Kingdom to Amiens, France in 1 hour 55 minutes. This was the first RFC aircraft to arrive in France.

Whilst Major Burke planned to be the first to land in France, Harvey Kelly took a short-cut over some woods and landed just before him. Commanding Officer Major Charles Burke wrote in his diary: "Just as I was gliding down I saw another machine. Landed at 8.22. It was Harvey Kelly." The route was straightforward, however given the limited range and reliability of the aircraft it kept close to points of safety: Swingate Down, Boulogne, south hugging the coast, then east along the Somme valley to Amiens. At 06.25 on 13 August, No 2 took off led by Major Burke flying Dover – Boulogne. From Boulogne they followed the coast as planned – except for Bay, who continued inland, apparently following a pre-planned cross country route. He landed, together with Air Mechanic Harris, in Amiens at 08.20, Major Burke arrived 2 minutes later. Although understandably annoyed at the flagrant disregard for his orders Burke took it as yet another example of Bay's playfully competitive nature and nothing further was said. A fellow pilot, Archibald James, described Bay as " .... the funniest man I have ever met. He kept me in roars of laughter the whole time". It's very likely that Bay's impact on Squadron morale also came into Burke's thinking.

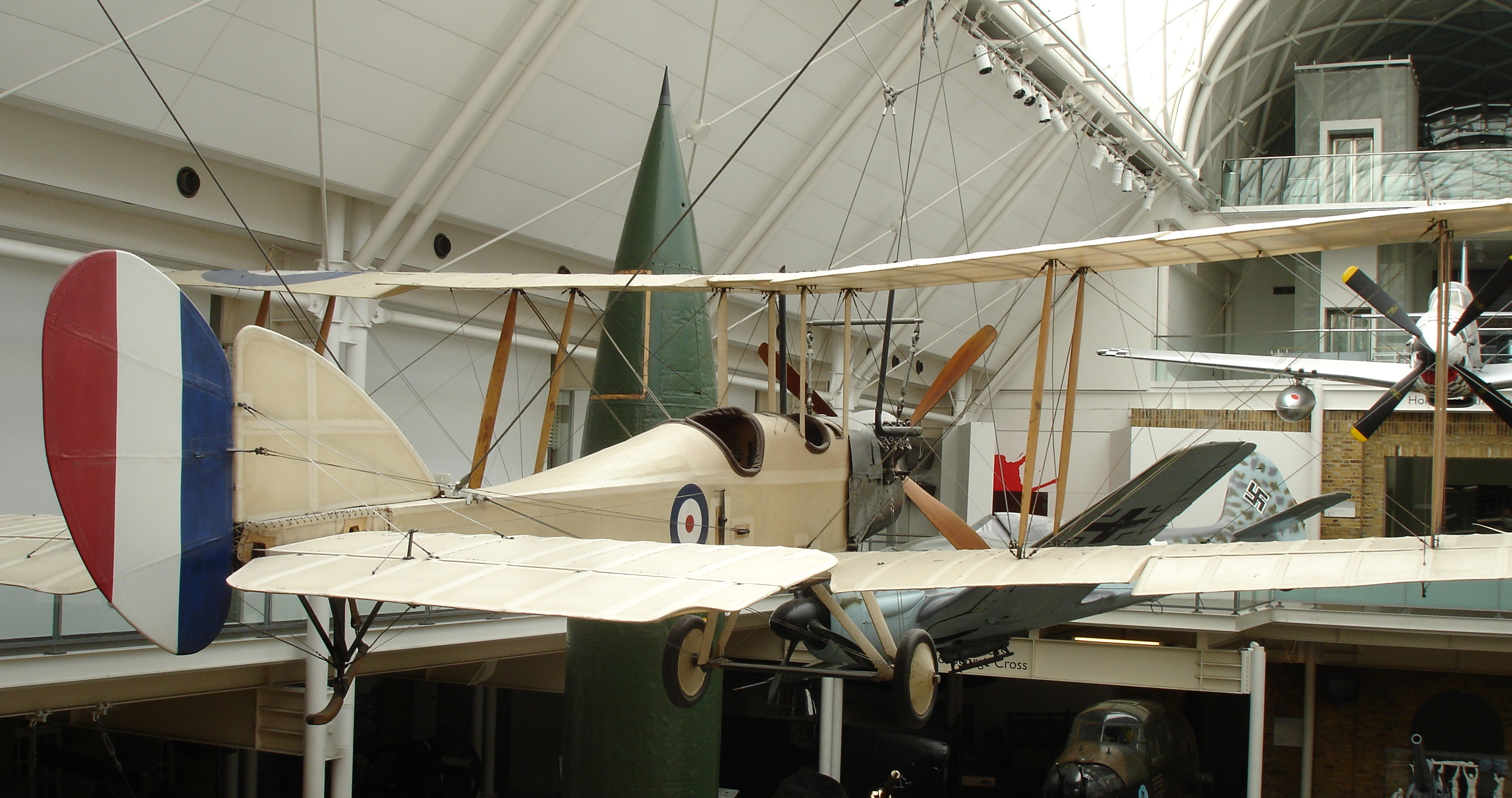
BE2 dedicated to HD-H-K, Imperial War Museum, London

Shortly after, on 26 August 1914, he gained the first ever British victory in air-to-air combat despite flying an unarmed aircraft. By maneuvering as if to hit the German Taube 2, other aggressive flying and using his pistol he forced the aircraft to the ground. Having chased off the crew he set fire to the plane and took off. In the early part of the war this method of taking victories became a fad.

Harvey-Kelly was a character well regarded by those who know him, as 'One of the "Mad Majors" whose doings became almost mythical among the infantry'. He always took a potato and a reel of cotton with him when he went over the lines. The Germans, he said, would be sure to treat him well if he had to land on the other side and they found him provided with such useful and scarce commodities. He reportedly had a habit of spitting over the side of his aircraft if 'archie' (anti aircraft fire) came too close, one day he came back because, he said, he "had no spit left".

On 18 February 1915 he was awarded the Distinguished Service Order for "services in connection with operations in the field". He was promoted captain on 23 May 1915, and major in January 1916.

== Final Flight ==
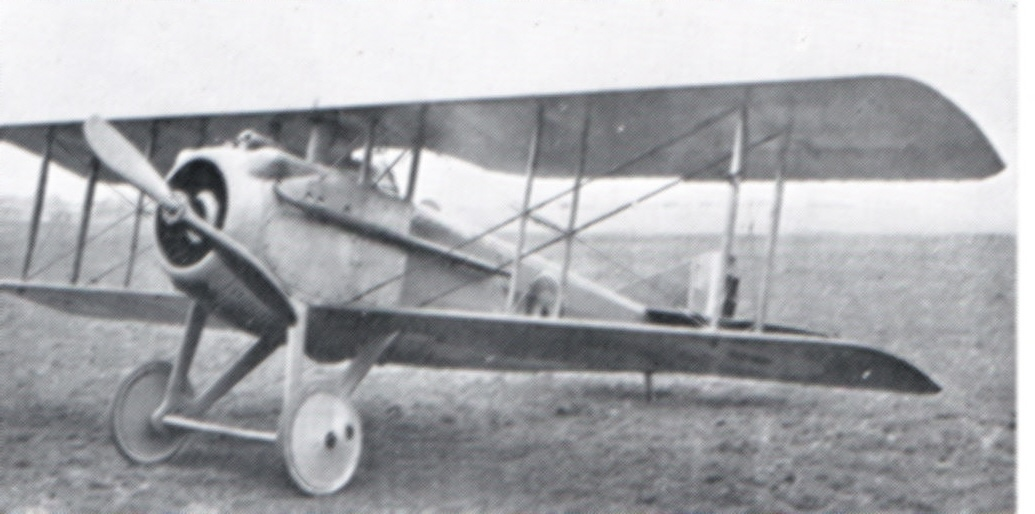
SPAD SVII aircraft of type used when Harvey-Kelly was shot down

Harvey-Kelly was not due to fly on the day of his final flight, 29 April 1917. Partly due to a rule that Squadron commanders did not fly (although many did) and partly due to a last minute switch. He was instead due to meet with Commander of the RFC Hugh Trenchard and Captain Maurice Baring.

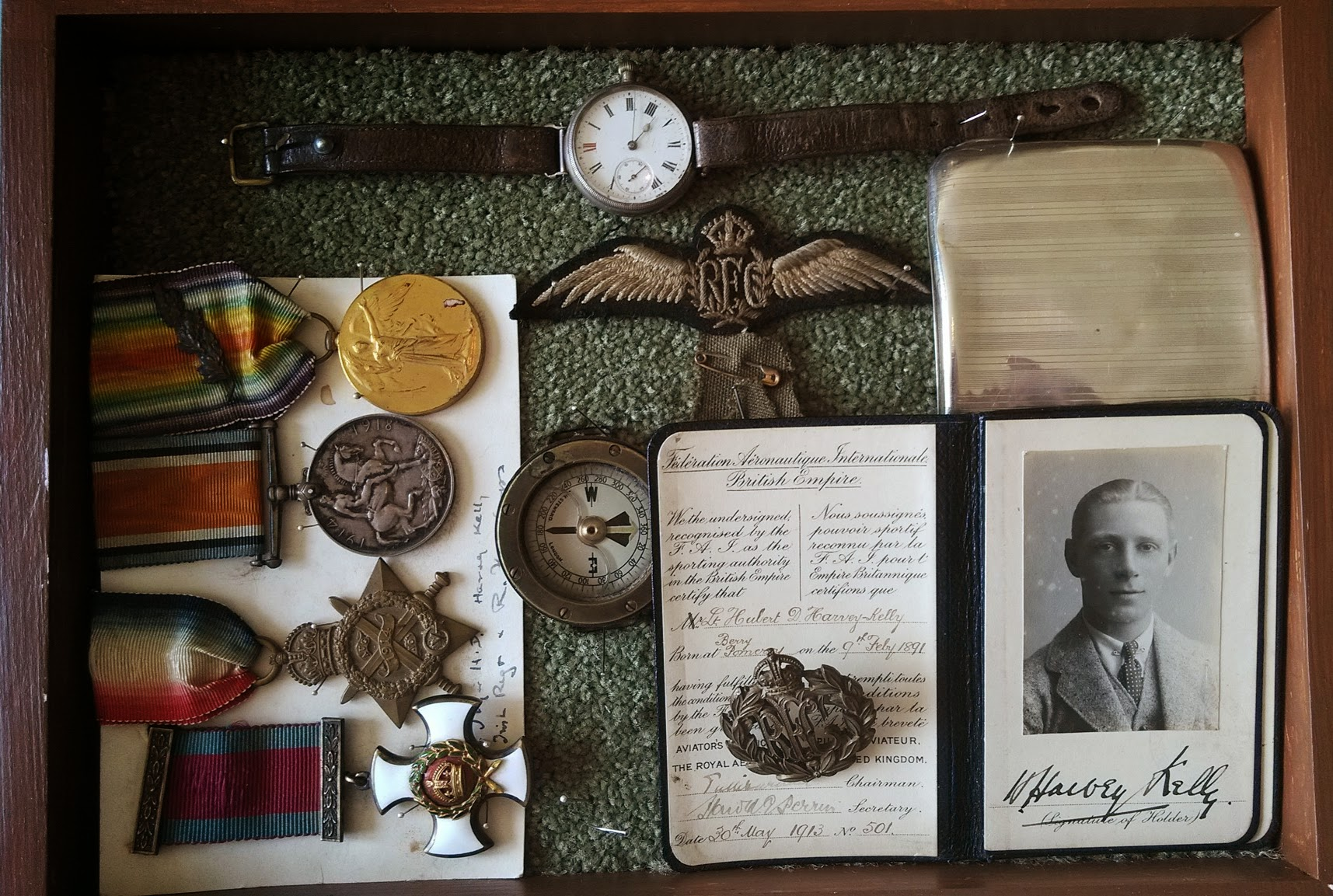
Personal possessions of HD Harvey-Kelly. Most sent back by the Germans after he was shot down

However, because Richthofen was operating in the area he went up and became a victim of what the RFC called Bloody April when they lost over 250 aircraft. In the attack HD Harvey-Kelly, with Lieutenants Hamilton and Applin, spotted eight Albatros D.IIIs. Although outnumbered the attack was pressed when Harvey-Kelly spotted six Sopwith Triplanes of No 1 Sqn RNAS. However, there are conflicting reports of whether these engaged or sheered away. During the dog fight Major Harvey-Kelly being shot down by Lt Kurt Wolff of Jasta 11. Major Harvey-Kelly and Lieutenant Applin were reported as killed in action, although Harvey-Kelly died of head wounds three days later in a German Hospital. He is buried in the Browns Copse Cemetery, Roeux, France. His cigarette case and other personal belongs were sent by the Germans back to his unit, and then sent on to his mother and remain with the Harvey-Kelly family to this day.

Von Richthofen paid an unintended compliment to Harvey-Kelly as he perceived the new SPAD unit to have been a special squadron organised to deal with his Staffel.
