= Kangri Karpo =

Mountain range in eastern Tibet

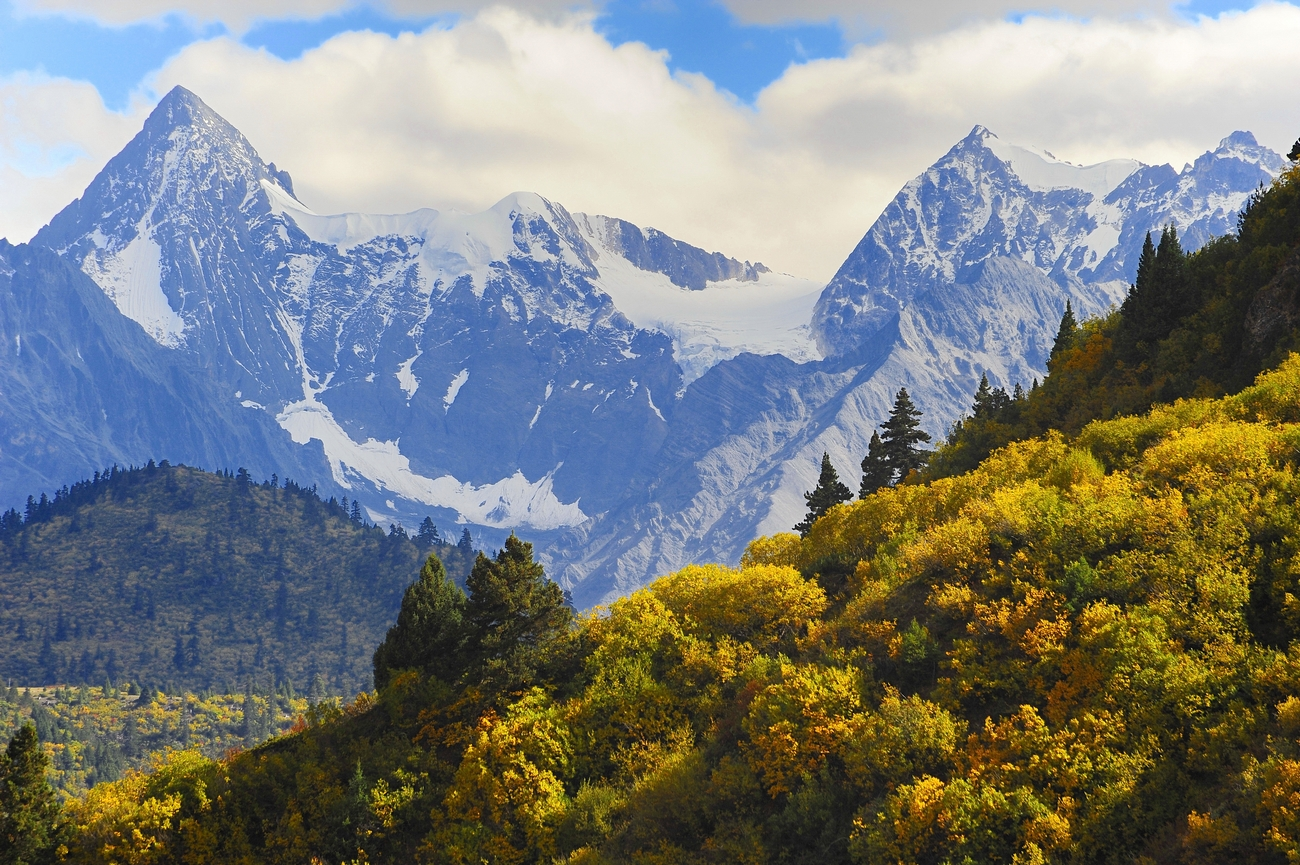
- The Kangri Karpo above Rawu in Baxoi County, Tibet

Highest point
- Peak: Bairiga
- Elevation: 6,882 m (22,579 ft)
- Coordinates: 29°09′57″N 96°43′27″E

Naming
- Native name: 岗日嘎布 (Chinese)

Geography
- Country: China
- Province: Tibet Autonomous Region
- Prefecture: Nyingchi, Chamdo
- County: Pome, Baxoi, Zayul

Kangri Karpo (Tibetan: གངས་རི་དཀར་པོ), also spelt Gangri Garbo (Chinese: 岗日嘎布; pinyin: Gǎngrì Gābù), is a mountain range in eastern Tibet, located primarily in Nyingchi Prefecture as well as a portion of Qamdo Prefecture in the Tibet Autonomous Region, China. The mountain range lies to the east of the Himalayas and to the west of the Hengduan Mountains. The mountains are geographically a southern extension of the eastern Transhimalayas.

== Physical geography and climate ==
The Kangri Karpo stretch for approximately 280 km (170 mi) from west to east. They lie at the eastern end of the Himalayan Range and were formed at the same time during the Indian subcontinent's collision with Eurasia. The Kangri Karpo are geologically related to the Himalayas, but are separated by the Yarlung Tsangpo's Grand Canyon. The eastern anchor of the Himalayas, Namcha Barwa, rises above the western Kangri Karpo just beyond the Yarlung Tsangpo. To the north, the Kangri Karpo are separated from the Nyenchen Tanglha by the Parlung Tsangpo River. To the northeast, the Kangri Karpo are connected with the Baxoila Ling, sometimes considered the westernmost component range of the Hengduan Mountains. Further east, the Kangri Karpo are separated from the Baxoila by the Zayü River. To the south, the Kangri Karpo transition to the Indian Mishmi Hills, also known in China as the Qilinggong Mountains (祁灵公山).

The highest peak of the Kangri Karpo, Bairiga or Ruoni, rises in the central portion of the range to an elevation of 6,882 m (22,579 ft) above sea level. Other notable peaks include Gemsongu at 6,450 m (21,160 ft), Kone Kangri at 6,347 m (20,823 ft), Yuhe Kangri at 6,327 m (20,758 ft), and Gheni at 6,177 m (20,266 ft).

The Kangri Karpo form a high-altitude barrier at the northeasternmost limit of the Indian subcontinent. The mountains here are in the direct path of the northeast-moving South Asian monsoon which leads to Kangri Karpo being the wettest location on the Tibetan Plateau. This also leads to one of the highest concentrations of glaciers in the region. Notable glaciers include the scenic Midiu Glacier, the Ata Glacier (the lowest glacier in Tibet reaching an elevation of 2,440 m (8,010 ft)), and the 30 km (19 mi)-long Lhagu Glacier.

Due to the heavy precipitation in the area, the Kangri Karpo support dense forests including the Northeastern Himalayan subalpine conifer forests at middle altitudes and Eastern Himalayan broadleaf forests at lower altitudes. At higher altitudes, the mountains are covered by Eastern Himalayan alpine shrub and meadows.

== Human geography ==
The Kangri Karpo lie in the southeast part of Tibet, at the junction between Kham to the east, Ü-Tsang to the west, and South Asian hill tribes to the south. The Tibetan Poyul Kingdom enjoyed relative independence on the Kangri Karpo's northern slopes until the early 20th century.

Today, the western Kangri Karpo are under the administration of Bomê County to the north and Mêdog County to the south. The bulk of the eastern Kangri Karpo are part of Zayü County while a small portion of the north-central Kangri Karpo are part of Baxoi County. All these counties are part of Nyingchi Prefecture, except for Baxoi which is part of Qamdo Prefecture. To the south of the Kangri Karpo are the Mishmi Hills which lie primarily in Arunachal Pradesh, India but are also claimed by China. The McMahon Line passes just south of the Kangri Karpo.

The only significant towns in the mountain range are Zhamo in the north, Rawu in the northeast, and Zayü in the southeast. The only vehicular road to cross the Kangri Karpo is the road to Mêdog via Galong Pass in the western part of the mountains that was completed in 2013. The northern portion of the Kangri Karpo are skirted by China National Highway 318 and have become a popular scenic destination for Chinese tourists. Access to this region of Tibet, however, is often restricted for foreigners.
