= Yiong Tsangpo =

Coordinates: 30°05′45″N 95°03′49″E

Yiong Tsangpo 易贡藏布 (Yìgòng Zàngbù)
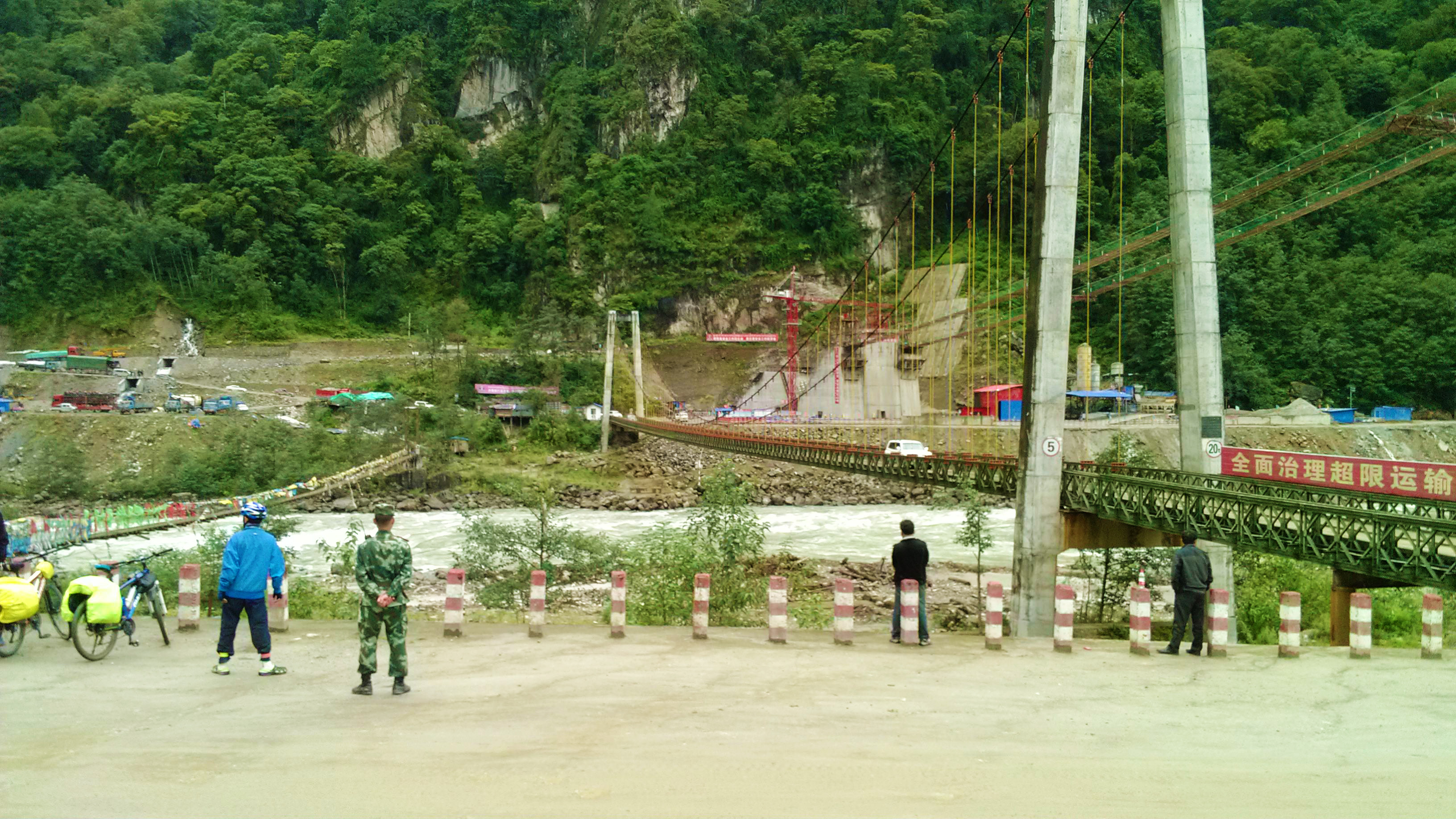
- Tongmai Bridge

Location
- Country: China
- Region: Tibet Autonomous Region
- Counties: Lhari County; Bomê County

Physical characteristics
- Source: Nyenchen Tanglha Mountains
  - location: Lhari County
- Mouth: Parlung Tsangpo
  - location: Near Tongmai, Bomê County
- Length: 286 km (178 mi)

The Yiong Tsangpo (Tibetan: ཡིད་འོང་གཙང་པོ།, Wylie: yid 'ong gtsang po, Chinese: 易贡藏布; pinyin: Yìgòng Zàngbù) is a right-bank tributary of the Parlung Tsangpo in eastern Tibet Autonomous Region of China. It starts in the Nyenchen Tanglha Mountains of central Lhari County, runs 286 kilometres and empties into the Parlung Tsangpo near Tongmai of Bomê County. A tremendous Yigong landslide occurred on the Yiong Tsangpo in Bomê County on April 9, 2000. It can be called the largest and longest rapid landslide in China.
