= Tongmai Special Bridge =

Highway bridge in Tibet

The Tongmai Special Bridge (Chinese: 通麦特大桥, 通麦大桥) is a critical project on the Sichuan-Tibet Highway, specifically along the southern route of National Highway 318, across the Yiong Tsangpo.

Three bridges spanning the river are situated in the same place, each from distinct historical periods. The primary thoroughfare is the Tongmai Special Bridge, a single-tower cable-stayed structure, while the original two bridges have ceased to accommodate motor vehicle traffic. The three bridges have been transformed into a picturesque location.

== History ==
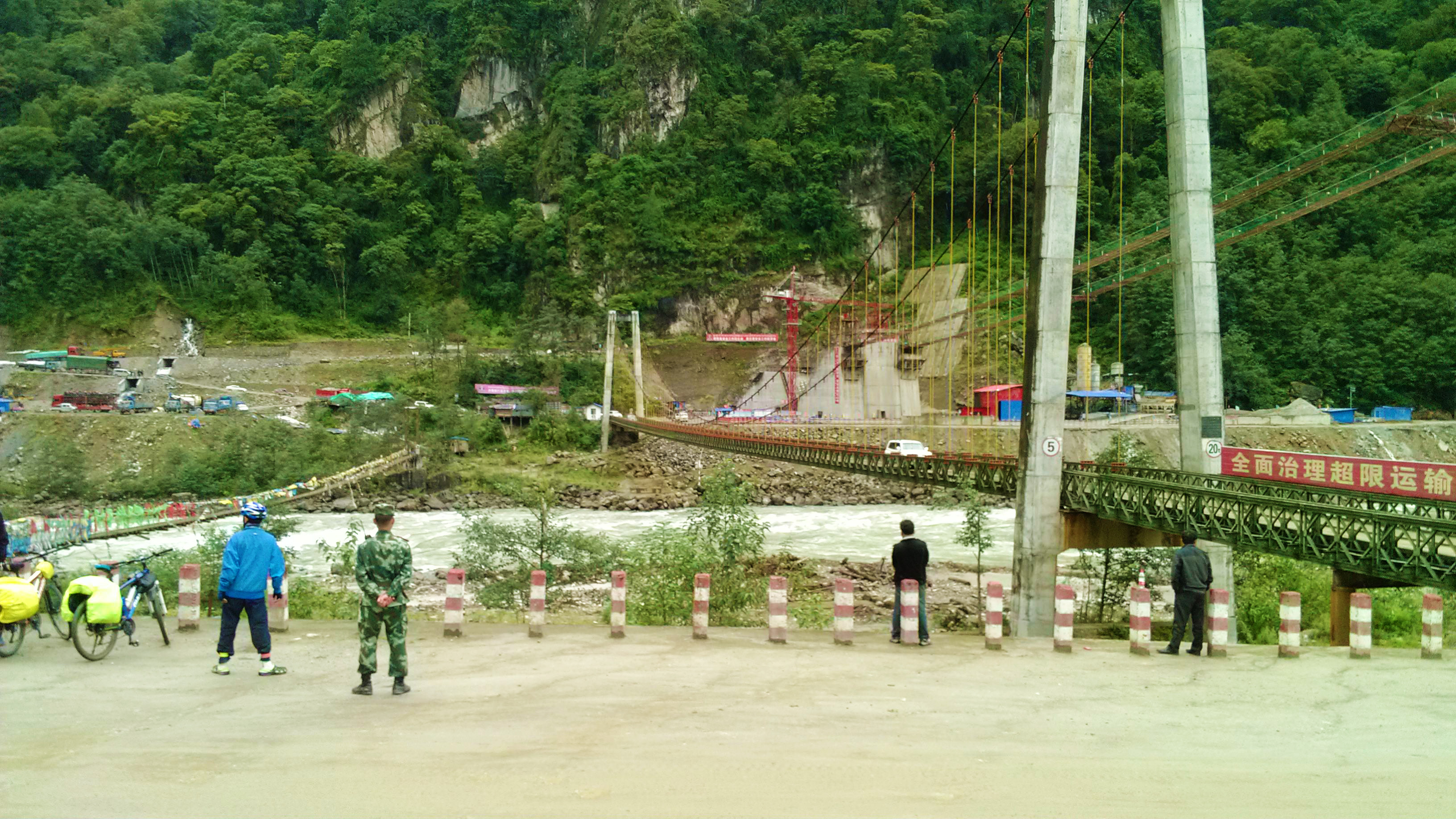
First Tongmai Bridge on the left, second Tongmai Bridge on the right in 2014

The first Tongmai Bridge was constructed in the 1950s. On April 9, 2000, a significant landslide transpired at Yiong Tsangpo in Tibet. Following the breach of the dam and subsequent drainage of the lake's water, the original permanent reinforced concrete bridge and several adjacent highways were eroded, resulting in a complete disruption of traffic along the Sichuan-Tibet Southern Route. More than 90 townships in Motuo, Bomê County, and Nyingchi counties were rendered isolated.

The second Tongmai Bridge incident occurred on August 2, 2013, when the rivet cables detached, leading to the failure of the bridge deck. Following 40 days of rigorous work, traffic successfully resumed on the morning of September 10, 2013. On the morning of January 26, 2015, traffic was halted due to the displacement of the steel frame structure.

The third Tongmai Bridge, also Tongmai Special Bridge, commenced operations on November 28, 2015, successfully concluding the handover and special acceptance, and officially began the trial operation phase on November 29. The bridge is engineered as a single-tower, single-span space cable suspension structure, spanning the Parlung Tsangpo and a single tower of the Yiong Tsangpo tributary. It is 415.7 meters in length, with a main span of 256 meters and a pier height of 59.5 meters.
