= Lhorong =

Lhorong may refer to:

- Lhorong County, county in Tibet
- Lhorong Town, town in Tibet
