= Pasho County =

Pasho County 八宿县 • དཔའ་ཤོད་རྫོང་། Baxoi, Pashö, Pashoi, Pashoe, Pashu
- County
- Baxoi County
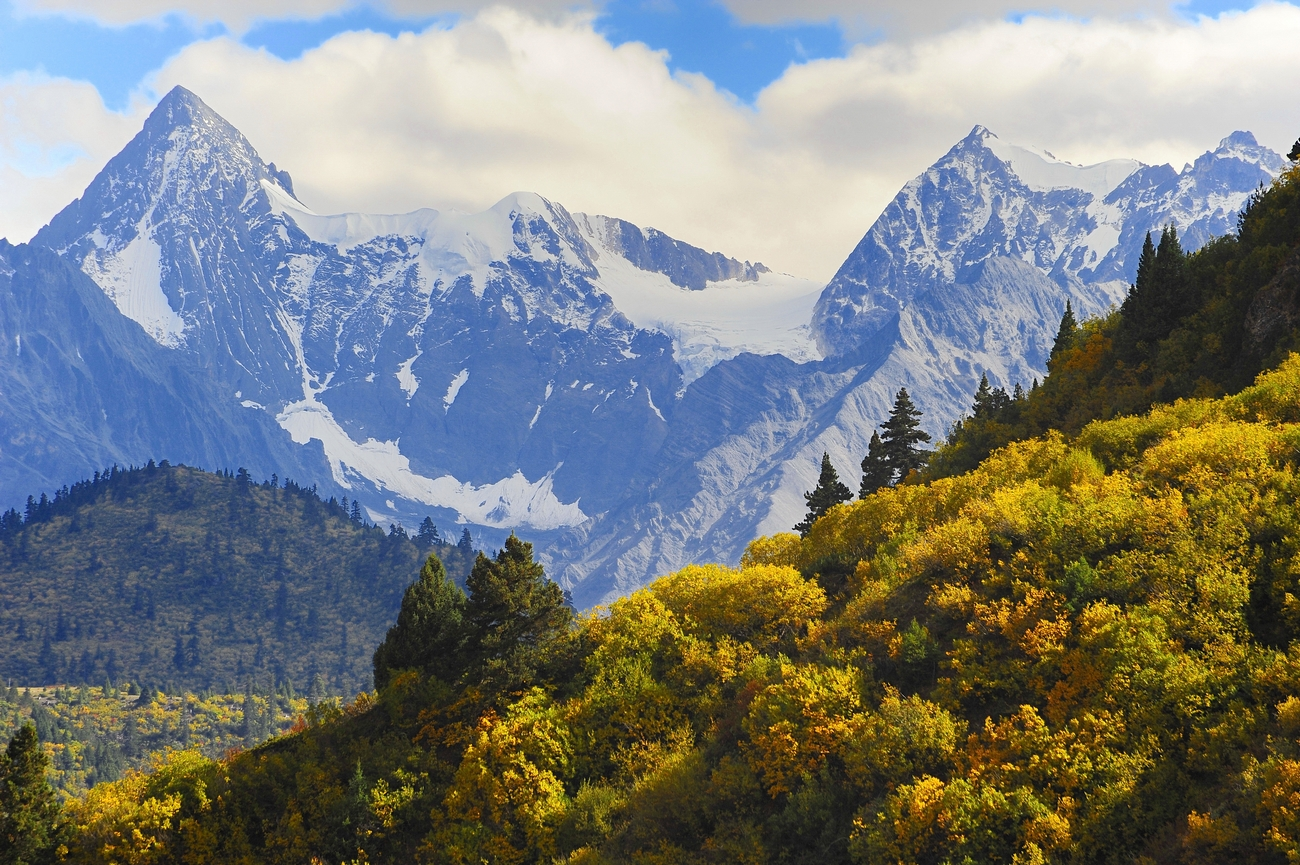
- The Kangri Karpo in Baxoi County

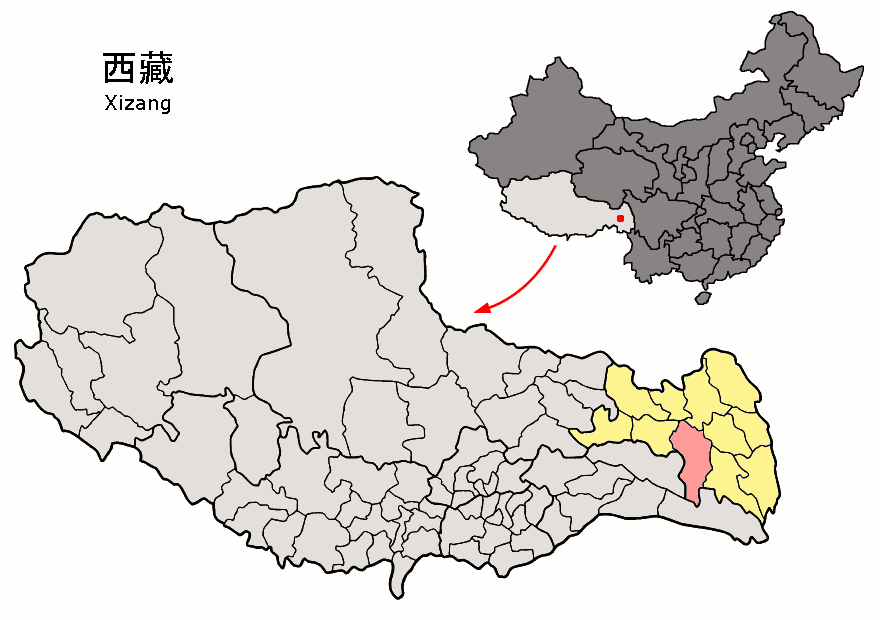
- Location of Baxoi County (red) in Chamdo City (yellow) and the Tibet Autonomous Region

- Location of the seat in the Tibet A.R. Baxoi (China)
- Coordinates: 30°3′25″N 96°55′7″E
- Country: China
- Autonomous region: Tibet
- Prefecture-level city: Chamdo
- County seat: Baima (Pasho)

Area
  - Total: 12,328.31 km^{2} (4,759.99 sq mi)

Population (2020)
  - Total: 43,538
  - Density: 3.5315/km^{2} (9.1467/sq mi)
- Time zone: UTC+8 (China Standard)
- Website: basu.changdu.gov.cn

Pasho County

Chinese name
- Simplified Chinese: 八宿县
- Traditional Chinese: 八宿縣
Transcriptions
Standard Mandarin
- Hanyu Pinyin: Bāsù Xiàn
Yue: Cantonese
- Jyutping: baat^{3}suk^{1} jyun^{2}

Tibetan name
- Tibetan: དཔའ་ཤོད་རྫོང་།
Transcriptions
- Wylie: dpa' shod rdzong
- THL: pa shö dzong
- Tibetan Pinyin: Baxoi Zong

Pasho County (Note: Alternative spellings Pashö, Pashoi, Pashoe and Pashu.) or Baxoi County (Tibetan: དཔའ་ཤོད་རྫོང་།; simplified Chinese: 八宿县; traditional Chinese: 八宿縣; pinyin: Bāsù Xiàn) is a county under the administration of the prefecture-level city of Chamdo in the Tibet Autonomous Region of China. The county seat is at Pema, which is also called the "Pasho Town". It contains the Pomda Monastery and Rakwa Tso lake. As of the 2020 Chinese Census, Pasho County has a population of 43,538.

== History ==
The area of present-day Pasho County belonged to the Tibetan Empire, around the same time as the Tang dynasty's existence.

During the Yuan dynasty, the area was incorporated as part of the Bureau of Buddhist and Tibetan Affairs.

During the Ming dynasty, the area was organized under the tusi of Mo'erkan.

The Pasho Larang was established in 1694. The Tibetan Kashag placed it under the control of the Kundeling Monastery, located in Lhasa, in 1725. Later, under the administration of the Qing dynasty, the area was placed under the jurisdiction of Enda County.

In 1912, Pasho was established as a zong.

In 1951, the People's Republic of China established a local government in the area. In May 1959, the area was reorganized as Pasho County. The county seat was moved from Tanggar to Baima in 1964, where it remains today.

== Geography ==
Pasho County is located within Chamdo, in the eastern part of the Tibet Autonomous Region. The county itself is located within the south of Chamdo. It borders Zogong County and Zhag'yab County to the east, Zayu County to the south, Lhorong County and Bomê County to the west, and Karub District and Riwoche County to the north. Pasho County has a maximum east–west distance of 112 kilometres (70 mi) and a maximum north–south distance of 150 kilometres (93 mi).

The county is highly mountainous, with an average elevation of about 3,260 metres (10,700 ft) above sea level. Pasho County contains the Brahmaputra–Salween water divide. The Ngajuk La pass (29.6687°N 96.7181°E) is on the divide. To the north, Ling Chu flows north and east draining into Salween. To the south, Parlung Tsangpo flows south and west to drain into the Tsangpo River (the Tibetan section of Brahmaputra). Pasho County hosts the Rakwa Tso lake and the Laigu Glacier.

=== Climate ===
Pasho town, owing to the strong rain shadow of local mountains surrounding the deep gorge in which it lies, has a cool semi-arid climate (Köppen BSk), being slightly warmer due to less high altitude and substantially drier than most of the eastern "river region" of Tibet – for instance its annual rainfall is only about half that of Lhasa. Summers are warm and showery, whilst winters are cool by day, freezing by night, and extremely dry.

Climate data for Pasho, elevation 3,260 m (10,700 ft), (1991–2020 normals, extremes 1981–2010)
Month	Jan	Feb	Mar	Apr	May	Jun	Jul	Aug	Sep	Oct	Nov	Dec	Year
Record high °C (°F)	18.4 (65.1)	19.6 (67.3)	25.0 (77.0)	25.4 (77.7)	30.3 (86.5)	31.9 (89.4)	33.4 (92.1)	31.6 (88.9)	32.0 (89.6)	27.9 (82.2)	22.0 (71.6)	17.7 (63.9)	33.4 (92.1)
Mean daily maximum °C (°F)	9.1 (48.4)	11.2 (52.2)	13.8 (56.8)	17.2 (63.0)	21.6 (70.9)	25.5 (77.9)	26.1 (79.0)	25.3 (77.5)	24.1 (75.4)	19.2 (66.6)	14.1 (57.4)	10.3 (50.5)	18.1 (64.6)
Daily mean °C (°F)	1.3 (34.3)	4.0 (39.2)	6.9 (44.4)	10.5 (50.9)	15.2 (59.4)	19.0 (66.2)	19.3 (66.7)	18.4 (65.1)	17.1 (62.8)	12.1 (53.8)	6.2 (43.2)	2.0 (35.6)	11.0 (51.8)
Mean daily minimum °C (°F)	−5.3 (22.5)	−2.4 (27.7)	1.2 (34.2)	5.1 (41.2)	9.7 (49.5)	14.0 (57.2)	14.4 (57.9)	13.6 (56.5)	11.9 (53.4)	6.4 (43.5)	−0.3 (31.5)	−4.7 (23.5)	5.3 (41.6)
Record low °C (°F)	−14.9 (5.2)	−10.9 (12.4)	−8.5 (16.7)	−3.6 (25.5)	0.6 (33.1)	4.5 (40.1)	7.4 (45.3)	5.1 (41.2)	1.0 (33.8)	−4.3 (24.3)	−9.5 (14.9)	−16.9 (1.6)	−16.9 (1.6)
Average precipitation mm (inches)	0.3 (0.01)	1.9 (0.07)	8.5 (0.33)	18.6 (0.73)	21.5 (0.85)	29.0 (1.14)	62.6 (2.46)	58.6 (2.31)	31.9 (1.26)	14.3 (0.56)	2.6 (0.10)	1.3 (0.05)	251.1 (9.87)
Average precipitation days (≥ 0.1 mm)	0.5	1.4	3.8	6.2	6.6	8.9	15.0	15.4	8.9	4.9	1.3	0.5	73.4
Average snowy days	1.2	2.4	4.0	2.0	0.2	0	0	0	0	0.5	1.6	0.8	12.7
Average relative humidity (%)	26	27	33	40	39	43	52	56	49	41	32	29	39
Mean monthly sunshine hours	212.9	223.8	252.8	245.7	260.9	232.9	201.4	199.4	218.9	233.1	216.8	207.6	2,706.2
Percentage possible sunshine	65	71	68	63	61	55	47	49	60	67	69	66	62
Source: China Meteorological Administration

== Administrative divisions ==
Pasho County is divided into 4 towns and 10 townships.

Name	Chinese	Hanyu Pinyin	Tibetan	Wylie
Town
Baima (Pema, Pasho)	白玛镇	Báimǎ zhèn	པད་མ་གྲོང་རྡལ།	pad ma grong rdal
Bangda	帮达镇	Bāngdá zhèn	སྤང་མདའ་གྲོང་རྡལ།	spang mda' grong rdal
Rawu	然乌镇	Ránwū zhèn	རྭ་འོག་གྲོང་རྡལ།	rwa 'og grong rdal
Tanggar	同卡镇	Tóngkǎ zhèn	ཐང་དཀར་གྲོང་རྡལ།	thang dkar grong rdal
Townships
Korqên Township	郭庆乡	Guōqìng xiāng	འཁོར་ཆེན་ཤང་།	'khor chen shang
Lagê Township	拉根乡	Lāgēn xiāng	གླ་སྐེ་ཤང་།	gla ske shang
Yiqên Township	益庆乡	Yìqìng xiāng	ཡིད་ཆེན་ཤང་།	yid chen shang
Jirong Township	集中乡	Jízhōng xiāng	དཀྱིལ་གྲོང་ཤང་།	dkyil grong shang
Karwa Pêkyim Township	卡瓦白庆乡	Kǎwǎbáiqìng xiāng	མཁར་བ་འཕེལ་ཁྱིམ་ཤང་།	mkhar ba 'phel khyim shang
Gyêda Township	吉达乡	Jídá xiāng	སྐྱེ་མདའ་ཤང་།	skye mda' shang
Gyari Township	夏里乡	Xiàlǐ xiāng	སྐྱ་རི་ཤང་།	skya ri shang
Yangpa Township	拥乡	Yōng xiāng	ཡངས་པ་ཤང་།	yangs pa shang
Wa Township	瓦乡	Wǎ xiāng	ཝ་ཤང་།	wa shang
Lingka Township	林卡乡	Línkǎ xiāng	གླིང་ཁ་ཤང་།	gling kha shang

== Demographics ==
Per the 2020 Chinese Census, Pasho County has a population of 43,538, up from the 39,021 recorded in the 2010 Chinese Census. Pasho County had a population of 38,170 as of the 2000 Chinese Census.

== Transport ==
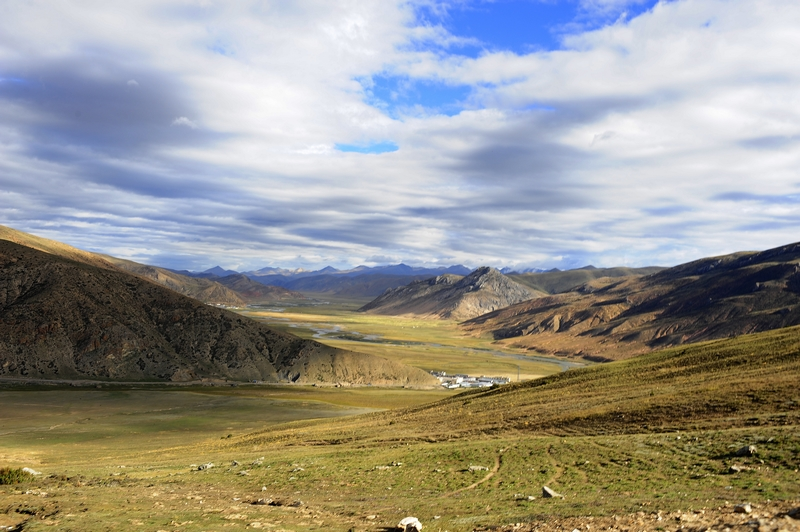
Pomda, Baxoi County

- China National Highway 318

== Maps ==
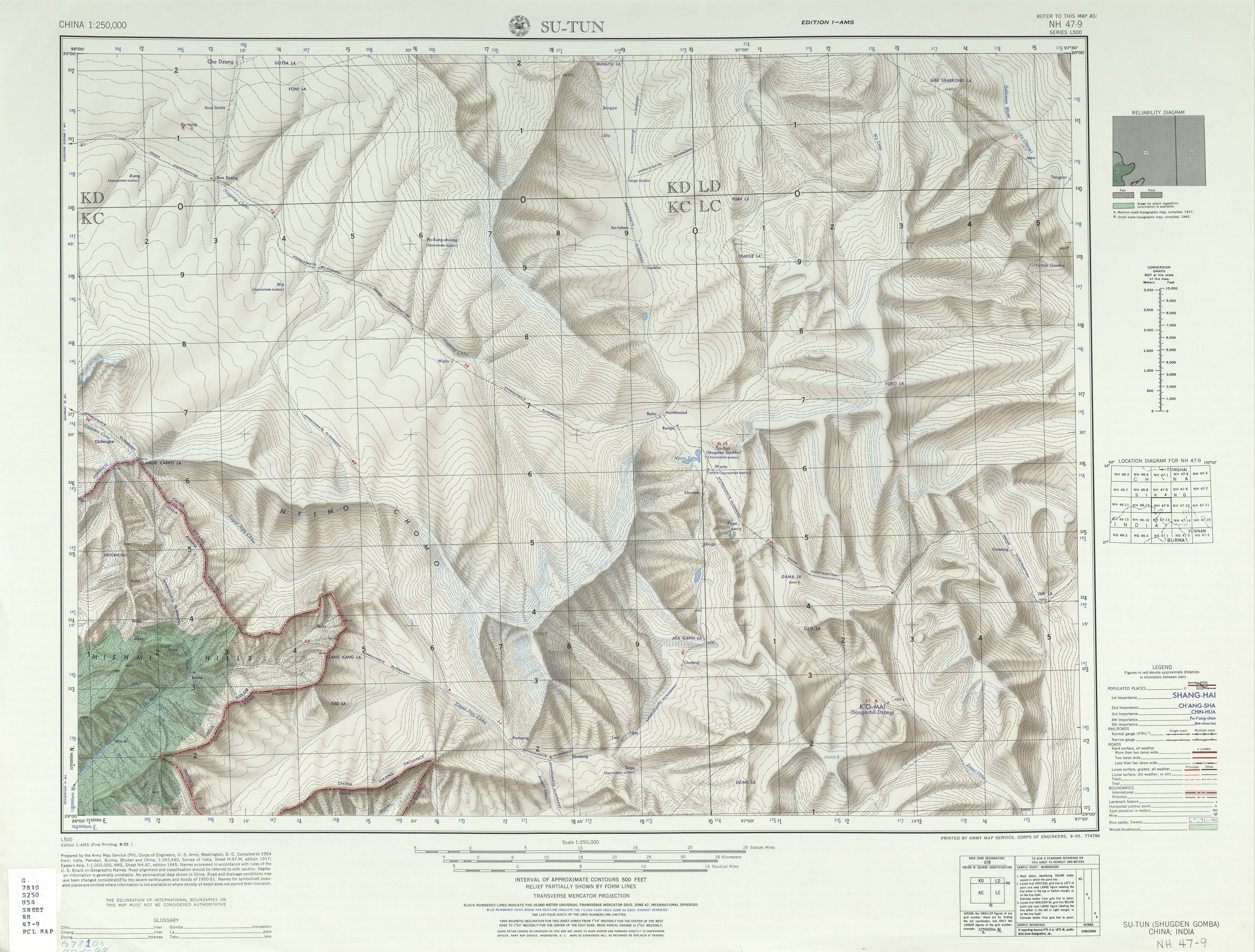
Su-tun (Shugden Gompa) (AMS, 1954)

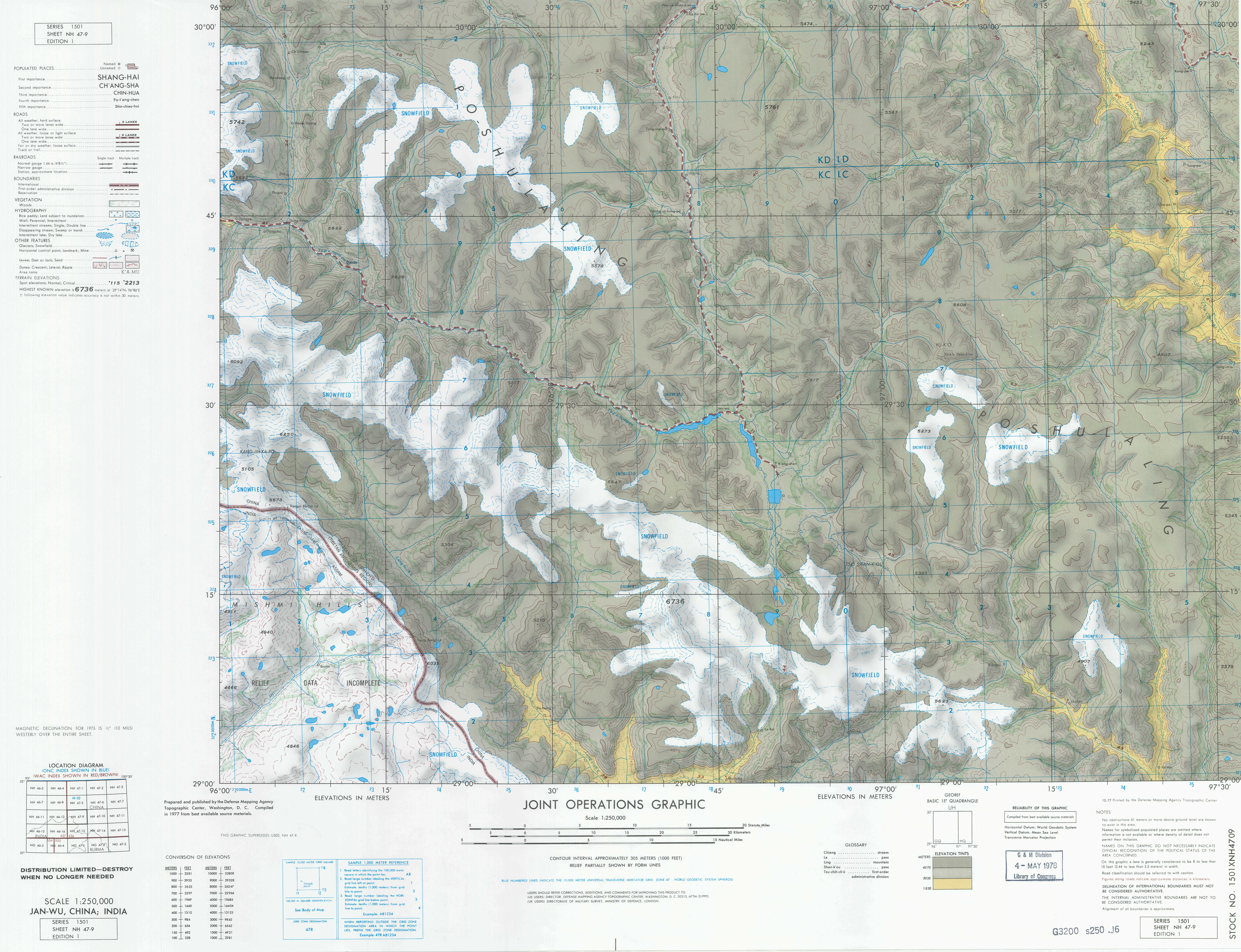
Janwu China (DMA)

== Bibliography ==
- Dorje, Gyurme (2004), Footprint Tibet Handbook with Bhutan (3rd ed.), Bath: Footprint Handbooks, ISBN 1-903471-30-3 – via archive.org
- Kingdon Ward, F.; Smith, Malcolm (November 1934), "The Himalaya East of the Tsangpo", The Geographical Journal, 84 (5): 369–394, doi:10.2307/1786924, JSTOR 1786924
