= Anglo-Chinese Convention =

Anglo-Chinese Convention may refer to:

- Chefoo Convention in 1876
- Convention of Calcutta in 1890
- Convention for the Extension of Hong Kong Territory in 1898
- Convention Between Great Britain and China Respecting Tibet in 1906
