= Powo =

Powo may refer to:

- Kingdom of Powo, a former Tibetan kingdom
- Plants of the World Online, a botanical database
