= Rakwa Tso =

Lake in the Tibet Autonomous Region, China

- རག་ཝྭ་མཚོ (Standard Tibetan); 然乌湖 (Chinese)
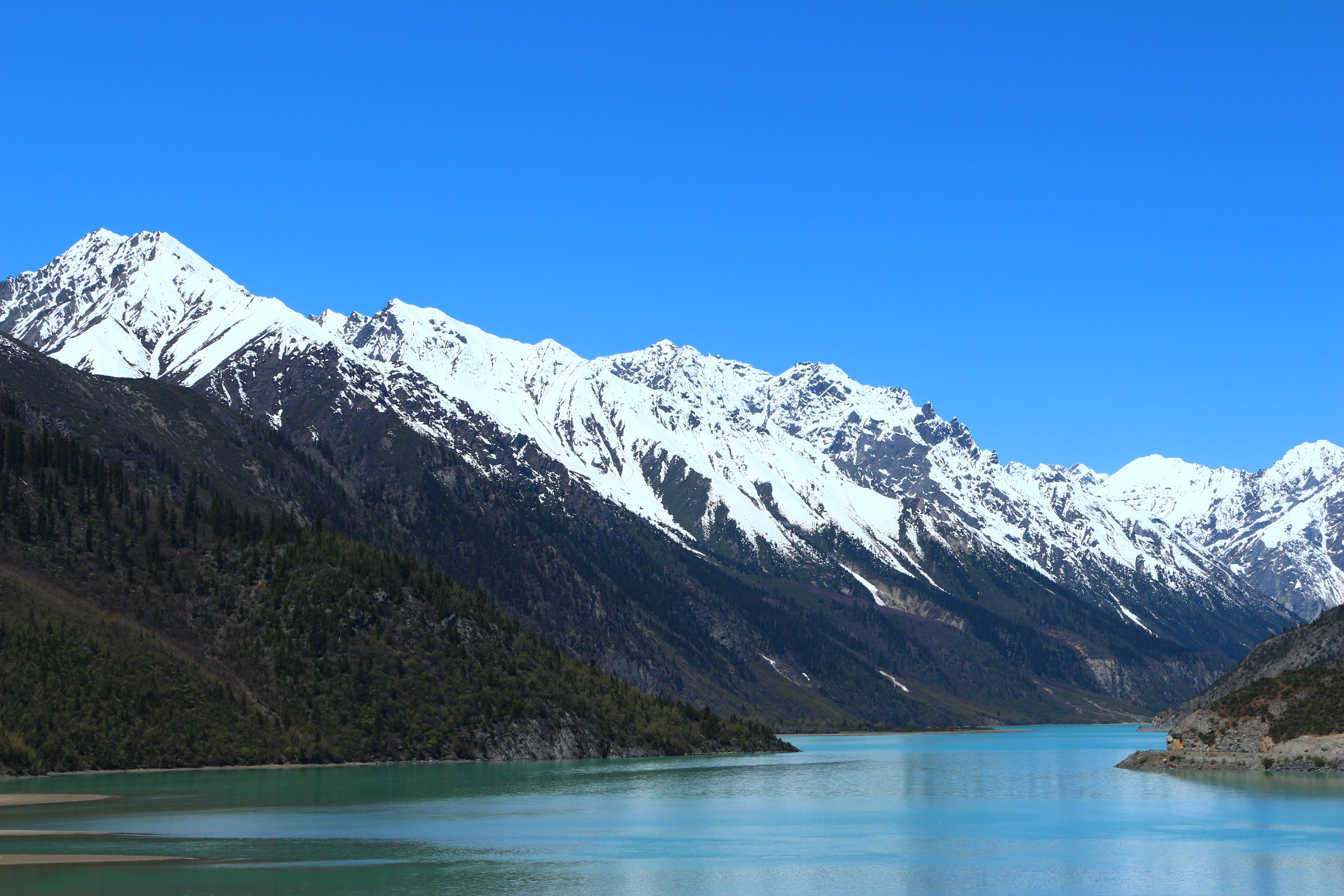
- View of Rakwa Tso

- Location of Rakwa in Tibet Autonomous Region.
- Location: Chamdo, Tibet Autonomous Region
- Coordinates: 29.4500°N 96.8000°E
- Primary outflows: Parlung Tsangpo
- Basin countries: China
- Max. length: 25 km (16 mi)
- Surface area: 27 km^{2} (10 sq mi)
- Surface elevation: 3,850 m (12,630 ft)
- Settlements: Rawu

Rakwa Tso (Tibetan: རག་ཝྭ་མཚོ, Wylie: rag wwa mtsho; simplified Chinese: 然乌湖; traditional Chinese: 然烏湖; pinyin: Ránwū Hú), also known as Rawu Tso or Ranwu Lake, is a lake in Baxoi County, Chamdo Prefecture, Tibet Autonomous Region, China, to the north of Arza Gongla Glacier, and to the south of Ngagung Tso. The lake covers an area of 27 km^{2} (10 sq mi), and has an elevation of 3,850 metres (12,630 feet). The lake was created by a landslide dam. Parlung River flows out of the lake.

The lake is within the historical region of Kham. The average temperature is 8.5 °C (47.3 °F), and the rainfall 849.7 mm (33.45 in). It has been a famous tourist destination.
