= Luolong =

Luolong may refer to:

- Luolong County, in Tibet
- Luolong District, in Luoyang, Henan, China
