= Ngagung Tso =

Lake in the Tibet Autonomous Region, China

- Standard Tibetan: རྔ་གུང་མཚོ།; Chinese: 安贡错
- Location of Ngagung in Tibet Autonomous Region.
- Location: Chamdo, Tibet Autonomous Region
- Coordinates: 29°22′N 96°50′E
- Primary outflows: Parlung Tsangpo
- Basin countries: China
- Max. length: 3.9 kilometres (2.4 mi)
- Max. width: 2.1 kilometres (1.3 mi)
- Surface area: 6.1 square kilometres (2.4 sq mi)

Ngagung Tso (Tibetan: རྔ་གུང་མཚོ།, Wylie: rnga gung mtsho; simplified Chinese: 安贡错; traditional Chinese: 安貢錯; pinyin: Āngòng Cuò) is a lake in Pome County, Nyingchi Prefecture, Tibet Autonomous Region, China, at the foot of the Lhagu Glacier. Alongside Rawok Tso, it one of the largest lakes in the region of Pome.
