= Convention of Lhasa =

1904 treaty between Tibet and Great Britain

Convention Between Great Britain and Thibet
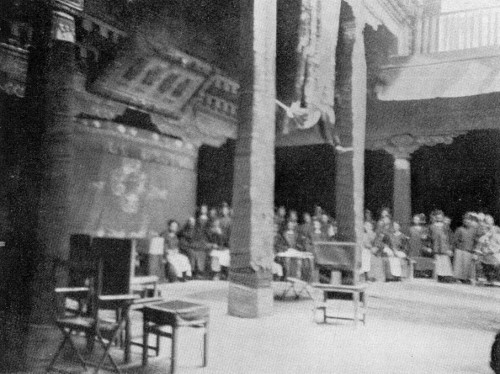
- Signing ceremony in Lhasa
- Signed: 7 September 1904; 120 years ago
- Location: Lhasa, Tibet, Qing Empire
- Parties: Great Britain; Tibet

The Convention of Lhasa, officially the Convention Between Great Britain and Thibet, was a treaty signed in 1904 between Tibet and Great Britain, in Lhasa, the capital of Tibet, then claimed by the Chinese as a protectorate of the Qing dynasty. It was signed following the British expedition to Tibet of 1903–1904, a military expedition led by Colonel Francis Younghusband, and was followed by the Anglo-Chinese Convention of 1906.

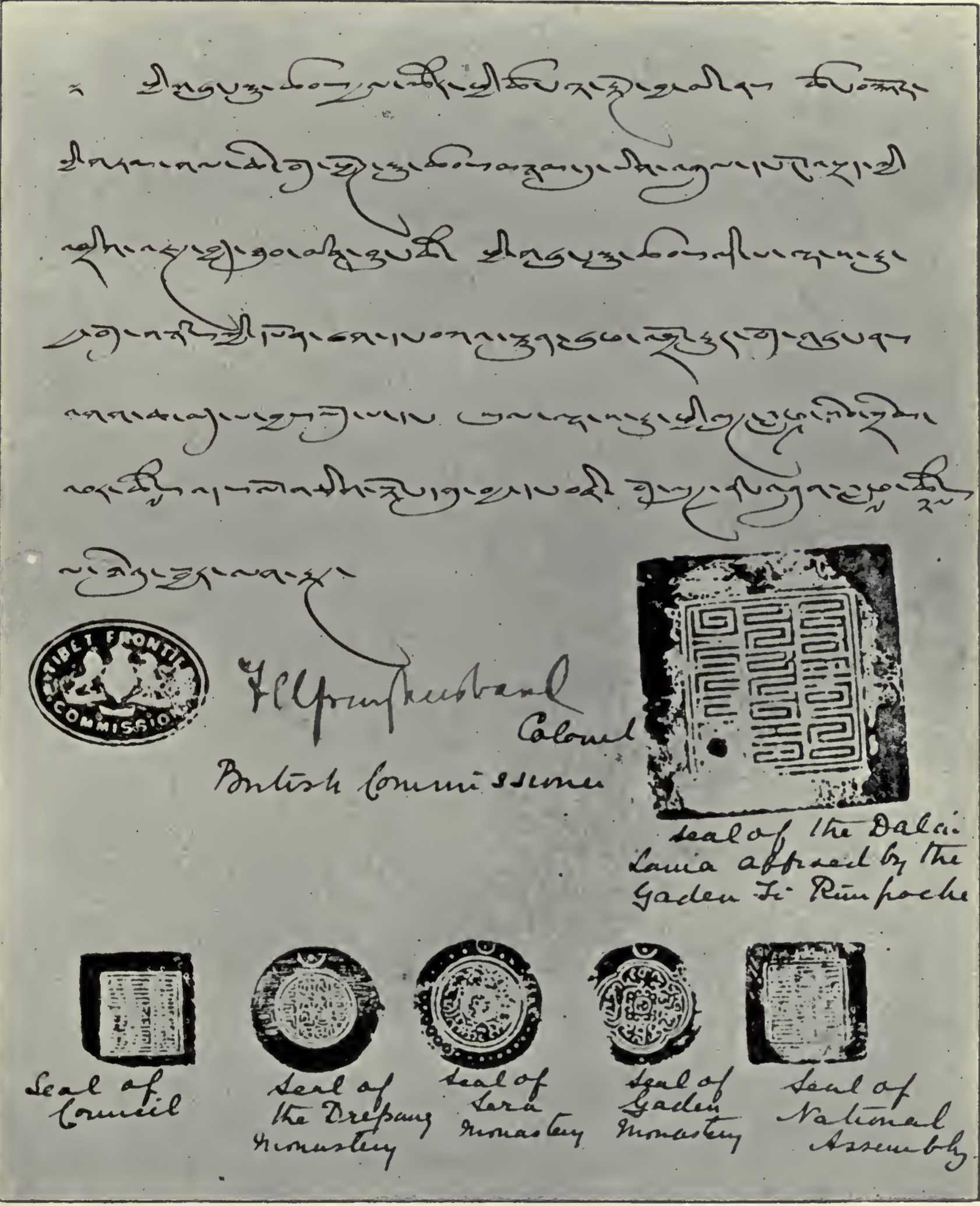
Seals affixed to the Convention between Great Britain and Tibet

== Terms ==
The main points of the treaty allowed the British to trade in Yatung, Gyantse, and Gartok while Tibet was to pay a large indemnity of 7,500,000 rupees, later reduced by two-thirds, with the Chumbi Valley ceded to Britain until payment was received. Further provisions recognised the Sikkim-Tibet border and prevented Tibet from entering into relations with other foreign powers. As a result, British economic influence grew further in Tibet. The treaty appeared as if signed by two sovereign countries without the involvement of China, but the British government continued to recognize that Tibet was under Chinese suzerainty. Article IX specified that the government of Tibet would guarantee that, without the previous consent of the British government, it would allow:

1. "No portion of Tibetan territory shall be ceded, sold, leased, mortgaged or otherwise given for occupation, to any foreign Power;
2. "No such Power shall be permitted to intervene in Tibetan affairs;
3. "No Representatives or Agents of any foreign Power shall be admitted to Tibet;
4. "No concessions for railways, roads, telegraphs, mining or other rights, shall be granted to any foreign Power, or the subject of any foreign Power. In the event of consent to such concessions being granted, similar or equivalent concessions shall be granted to the British Government;
5. "No Tibetan revenues, whether in kind or in cash, shall be pledged or assigned to any foreign Power, or to the subject of any foreign Power."

The size of the indemnity had been the hardest factor to accept for the Tibetan negotiators. The Secretary of State for British India, St John Brodrick, had in fact expressed the need for it to be "within the power of the Tibetans to pay" and gave Younghusband a free hand to be "guided by circumstances in this matter". Younghusband raised the indemnity demanded from 5,900,000 to 7,500,000 rupees, and further demanded the right for a British trade agent, based at Gyantse, to visit Lhasa "for consultations". It seems that he was still following Lord Curzon's geo-political agenda to extend British influence in Tibet by securing the Chumbi Valley for Britain and denying it to the Russians as part of the Great Game. Younghusband wanted the payment to be met by yearly instalments; it would have taken about 75 years for the Tibetans to clear their debt, and since British occupation of the Chumbi valley was surety until payment was completed, the valley would remain in British hands. Younghusband wrote to his wife immediately after the signing; "I have got Chumbi for 75 years. I have got Russia out for ever". The regent commented that "When one has known the scorpion [meaning China] the frog [meaning Britain] is divine".

== Aftermath ==
The Qing imperial resident in Lhasa, the Amban, later publicly repudiated the treaty, while Britain announced that it still accepted Chinese claims of authority over Tibet. Acting Viceroy Lord Ampthill reduced the indemnity by two-thirds and considerably eased the terms in other ways. The provisions of this 1904 treaty were revised in the Anglo-Chinese Convention of 1906. The British, for a fee from the Qing court, also agreed "not to annex Tibetan territory or to interfere in the administration of Tibet", while China engaged "not to permit any other foreign state to interfere with the territory or internal administration of Tibet".

== See also ==
- British expedition to Tibet (1903–1904)
- Convention Between Great Britain and China Respecting Tibet (1906)
- Anglo-Russian Convention (1907)
- Simla Convention (1913–1914)

== Bibliography ==
- Allen, Charles (2004), Duel in the Snows: The True Story of the Younghusband Mission to Lhasa, John Murray Press, ISBN 0-7195-5427-6
  - Allen, Charles (2015), Duel in the Snows: The True Story of the Younghusband Mission to Lhasa, John Murray Press, ISBN 978-1-4736-2754-3
- Bell, Charles (1924), Tibet Past and Present (First ed.), Oxford University Press
- Goldstein, Melvyn C. (1989), A History of Modern Tibet, 1913-1951: The Demise of the Lamaist State, University of California Press, ISBN 978-0-520-91176-5
- Lamb, Alastair (1989), Tibet, China & India, 1914-1950: a history of imperial diplomacy, Roxford Books
- Norbu, Dawa (2001), China's Tibet Policy, Routledge, ISBN 978-1-136-79793-4
- Powers, John; Holzinger, Lutz (2004), History as Propaganda: Tibetan Exiles Versus the People's Republic of China, Oxford University Press, USA, ISBN 978-0-19-517426-7
- Sperling, Elliot (2004), The Tibet-China Conflict: History and Polemics (PDF), East-West Center Washington, ISBN 978-1-932728-12-5, archived from the original (PDF) on 2019-02-03
- Sperling, Elliott (2009), Tibet and China: The Interpretation of History Since 1950
- Van Eekelen, Willem Frederik (1967), Indian Foreign Policy and the Border Dispute with China, Springer, ISBN 978-94-017-6555-8
