= Baima, Baxoi County =

Baima
- Town

Chinese transcription(s)
  - Traditional: 白瑪
  - Simplified: 白玛
  - Pinyin: Báimǎ
- Location within Tibet Autonomous Region
- Coordinates: 30°3′N 96°54′E
- Country: People's Republic of China
- Region: Tibet Autonomous Region
- Prefecture: Chamdo Prefecture
- County: Baxoi County
- Nearby settlements (distance): Bamda; 20.5 mi (33 km) Chongsar; 18.3 mi (29 km); Gyari; 26.7 mi (43 km); Lingka; 14.9 mi (24 km); Tanggar; 33 mi (53 km); Zhaxize; 7.9 mi (13 km) Nyige; 29.4 mi (47 km)
- Elevation: 3,772 m (12,375 ft)

Population
  - Total: 378
  - Major Nationalities: Tibetan
  - Regional dialect: Tibetan language
- Time zone: +8
- Climate: Cwb

Baima (Tibetan: པད་མ།, Wylie: pad ma, ZWPY: Baima; Chinese: 白玛; pinyin: Báimǎ) is a town in Baxoi County, Chamdo Prefecture of the Tibet Autonomous Region of the People's Republic of China. It lies at an altitude of 3,772 metres (12,378 ft). As of 2020, it administers Baima Residential Community and the following eight villages:

- Yoiba Village (ཡོལ་པ, 约巴村)
- Zhubba Village (སྒྲུབ་པ, 珠巴村)
- Nairab Village (གནས་རབ, 乃然村)
- Rixi Village (རི་གཞི, 日吉村)
- Wanbêb Village (ཝ་འབེབས, 旺比村)
- Samar Village (ས་དམར, 沙木村)
- Dêngka Village (སྟེང་ཁ, 丁卡村)
- Xaiba Village (གཤས་པ, 西巴村)

== See also ==
- List of towns and villages in Tibet
