= Anglo-Russian Convention =

1907 treaty between the United Kingdom and Russia

Anglo-Russian Convention of 1907
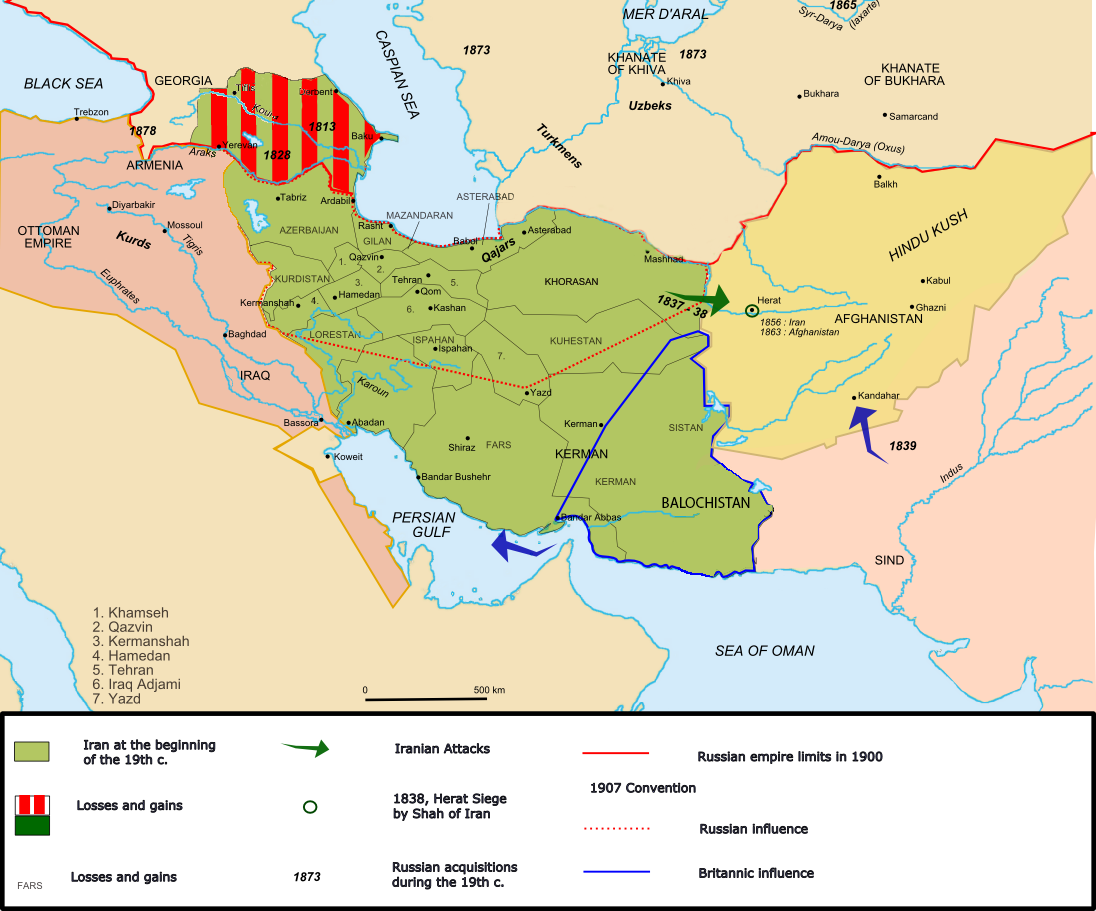
- Map of southwest Asia, showing British and Russian areas of rule or influence.
- Signed: 18 August 1907; 119 years ago (Note: 31 August O.S.)
- Location: Saint Petersburg, Russian Empire
- Signatories: United Kingdom; Russian Empire

Full text
- Anglo-Russian Convention at Wikisource

The Anglo-Russian Convention of 1907 (Note: (Russian: Англо-Русская Конвенция 1907 г., romanized: Anglo-Russkaya Konventsiya 1907 g.), also known as the Convention between the United Kingdom and Russia relating to Persia, Afghanistan, and Tibet (Конвенция между Соединенным Королевством и Россией относительно Персии, Афганистана, и Тибета; Konventsiya mezhdu Soyedinennym Korolevstvom i Rossiyey otnositel'no Persii, Afghanistana, i Tibeta),) was a treaty signed between United Kingdom and the Russian Empire on 31 August 1907 in Saint Petersburg. It marked the end of the "Great Game" in Central Asia, where a longstanding rivalry had ensued between the two European colonial empires. The treaty also furthered the Anglo-Russian interest to outflank the German Empire, which was threatening to establish a railroad from Berlin to Baghdad and align with the weakened Ottoman Empire.

The Convention ended the long dispute over Persia between the two parties. The United Kingdom promised to stay out of northern Persia, and Russia recognized southern Persia as part of the British sphere of influence. Russia also promised to stay out of Tibet and Afghanistan. In exchange, London extended loans and some political support. The convention brought shaky British–Russian relations to the forefront by solidifying boundaries that identified respective control in Persia, Afghanistan, and Tibet. This agreement would eventually form a component of the Triple Entente.

== Background ==
During the last third of the nineteenth century, the Russian Empire's advances into Central Asia and the consolidation of the United Kingdom's domination of South Asia led to intense rivalry between the two European powers. The conflicting interests centered on Afghanistan, Iran, and Tibet, three states that constituted buffers between the two powers. The emergence of the German Empire as a world power and the defeat in 1905 of Russia by a nascent Asian power, the Empire of Japan, in the Russo-Japanese War, helped to persuade some British and Russian officials of a need to resolve their respective differences in Asia. There was talk of an entente during the 1880s and 1890s, especially after Britain's occupation of Egypt in 1882. However, there was stiff resistance in Britain to a deal with Russia. In the leadup to the convention, there were discussions on the Straits question. Foreign Minister Sir Edward Grey thought entente with Russia a good idea. On 20 October 1905, during the election, he said:

...if Russia accepts, cordially and whole-heartedly, our intention to preserve the peaceable possession of our Asiatic possessions, then I am quite sure that in this country no government will make it its business to thwart or obstruct Russia's policy in Europe. On the contrary, it is urgently desirable that Russia's position and influence be re-established in the councils of Europe.

and later, writing to his ambassador to Russia Sir Arthur Nicolson:

It is not for us to propose changes with regard to the treaty conditions of the Dardanelles. I think some change in the direction desired by Russia would be admissible and we should be prepared to discuss the question if Russia introduces it.

In early 1907, Alexander Izvolsky, the Russian ambassador at Paris, raised the question and talks were carried on in London with Russian Ambassador Count Alexander Benckendorff. Little is known but the "suggestion appears to have been made that Russia should have free egress from the Black Sea through the Straits, while other powers should have the right to send their vessels of war into the Straits without going into the Black Sea" together with some talk of "Russia's occupying the Bosphorus and England the Dardanelles, after which the Straits might be opened to other warships as well." In the event nothing came of the discussions at the time.

=== Rise of Germany ===
On 20 May 1882, Germany entered into the Triple Alliance with Italy and Austria-Hungary, complementing its industrial and socio-political ascendance in the world arena. Furthermore, Germany dramatically increased its military output from the early 1900s up to the outbreak of the First World War. Under the unified German state, Otto von Bismarck worked to increase the nation's global influence and reach what was then the zenith of German power. While Britain and Russia were hostile to German designs in the region, members of the Triple Alliance were in turn opposed to Anglo-Russian influence in Asia. Thus, military and territorial expansion was Germany's key to making itself a major player in the international arena of power. Germany's interest in the Middle East took a secondary position, one subordinate to Germany's primary policy toward Europe, throughout the late 19th and early 20th centuries. While of secondary importance, it was a tool that was used to manipulate the Middle Eastern attempt to play off the Western powers against each other. Berlin peacefully made inroads into the Ottoman Empire and had few colonial aspirations in the region.

=== Trouble in Persia ===
In 1905, revolutionary activity spread throughout Tehran, forcing Mozaffar ad-Din Shah Qajar to accept a constitution, allow the formation of a majles (parliamentary assembly), and hold elections. Major figures in the revolution had secular goals, which then created rifts in the clergy to the advantage of the monarchy. Neither the British nor the Russian governments approved of the new political arrangement, which was both liberal and unstable, and preferred a stable puppet state, which allowed foreign concessions and supported their designs in the region.

To facilitate their goals in Persia, the British and the Russian governments discussed splitting it into three zones. The agreement stipulated that it would "allocate the north, including Isfahan, to Russia; the south-east, especially Kerman, Sistan, and Baluchistan to Britain; and demarcate the remaining land between the two powers as a neutral zone". The division of Persia would reinforce the control of Britain and Russia over their respective territorial and economic interests in the country as well as allow for continued interference in Persia's political system. With foreign help, the revolutionaries became outflanked by a combination of European and monarchist activities. The Persian government quickly came to realise that an Anglo-Russian alliance posed a larger threat to Iranian sovereignty than the two powers being hostile. Consequently, in 1907, Britain and Russia signed an agreement to regulate their economic and political interests.

== Terms ==
The Anglo-Russian Convention formalized the spheres of influence of the Russian Empire and the British Empire in Persia, Afghanistan and Tibet.

=== Persia ===
The agreement recognized the country's sovereignty but also divided it into three separate zones. The agreement designated all of northern Iran, which bordered Russia's possessions in Transcaucasia and Central Asia, as an exclusive sphere of influence for Russian interests. The northern zone was defined as beginning at Qasr-e Shirin in the west, on the border with the Ottoman Empire, and running through Tehran, Isfahan and Yazd to the eastern border, where the frontiers of Afghanistan, Iran, and Russia intersected. A smaller zone in southeastern Iran, which bordered British India, was recognized as an exclusive sphere for Britain. The British zone extended west as far as Kerman in the south central and Bandar Abbas in the south. The area separating these two spheres, including part of central Iran and the entire southwest, was designated a neutral zone in which both countries and their respective private citizens could compete for influence and commercial privileges.

For Britain and Russia, the agreement was important in establishing a diplomatic alignment that endured until the First World War. The Persian government, however, had not been consulted about the agreement but was informed after it had been signed. Although not in a position to prevent Britain and Russia from implementing the agreement, the Persian government refused to recognize the accord's legitimacy since it threatened the country's national integrity. Iranian nationalists, in particular, were infuriated by Britain's signing of the treaty, a country that they had considered as a beacon of democracy during the Constitutional Revolution. Subsequently, an important legacy of the agreement was the growth of anti-British sentiments and other anti-Western attitudes as strong components of Iranian nationalism. The agreement did not eliminate all competition between the two powers with respect to their policies in Iran, but after 1907, broad co-operation was fostered, particularly when Anglo-Russian interests were threatened. In particular, Britain and Russia intervened in Iran's domestic politics, supporting the royalists in their struggle with the constitutionalists. The agreement lapsed in 1918, after it was renounced by the new revolutionary Soviet Russia.

=== Afghanistan ===
With the Anglo-Russian Convention Russia acknowledged that Afghanistan was in the British sphere of influence as long as the United Kingdom did not attack the country, and in exchange, the United Kingdom gave Russia's right to equal commerce and direct communication with Afghan officials on non-political topics. Habibullah Khan, the Emir of Afghanistan felt humiliated and outraged when he read the terms of the convention, partly because the United Kingdom had not bothered to notify him about the negotiations or their conclusions. Like the terms relating to Persia, the agreement resulted in the growth of anti-British sentiments in Afghanistan.

=== Tibet ===
The Anglo-Russian Convention acknowledged the "Chinese suzerainty" over Tibet, and the United Kingdom pledged not to deal with Tibet unilaterally without the approval of the Chinese government. The United Kingdom thought that this convention would put a stop to Russia's expansionist efforts, which were threatening India, and with the development of Anglo-Russian ties in the early 1900s, both the United Kingdom and Russia acknowledged Tibet's role as a buffer in the Anglo-Russian Convention that also recognized the suzerainty of China over Tibet, although China did not accept the term "suzerainty" and instead used the term "sovereignty" to describe its status in Tibet since 1905. The conclusion of the Anglo-Russian Convention followed the British expedition to Tibet of 1903–1904, the Convention of Lhasa of 1904, and the Anglo-Chinese Convention of 1906 which essentially reestablished China's role as Tibet's controlling power.

== See also ==
- Panjdeh incident
- Dogger Bank incident
- Entente Cordiale
- Japan–Russia Secret Agreements
- Franco-Russian Alliance
- Franco-Japanese Treaty of 1907
- The Great Game
- Persian Campaign
