= Red Building of the Zamu Central County Committee =

Coordinates: 29°51′46″N 95°46′04″E

The Red Building of the Zamu Central County Committee (Chinese: 扎木中心县委红楼, 波密县中心红楼), located in Bomê County, Nyingchi, Tibet Autonomous Region, is a two-story wooden structure designed in a Soviet-style architectural imitation. Built in 1953, the site originally comprised three buildings, of which only one remains today. In 1959, it became a significant location when the People's Liberation Army successfully repelled Tibetan rebels there. In 2013, the building was designated as a national key cultural relic protection unit.

== History ==
In 1953, the Xikang-Tibet Highway Administration (Chinese: 康藏公路管理局) set up an office in Zamu Township and constructed three Soviet-style wooden buildings, known as the Red Buildings, to serve as office space. One of these buildings became the headquarters of the Zamu Central County Committee of the Chinese Communist Party (CCP). In 1959, an insurgency broke out in Tibet. On January 4, rebels attacked the Red Building, leading to the Zamu Defense Battle. A platoon of People's Liberation Army (PLA) soldiers stationed in Bomi, along with over 60 staff members from the county CCP offices and the Second Office of the Chamdo People's Liberation Committee, held out in the Red Building for 10 days until reinforcements broke the siege. The defenders, at the cost of five casualties, successfully repelled the attackers, killing more than 190 rebels. Afterward, to accommodate the expansion of the county CCP committee, the other two Red Buildings were dismantled, leaving the largest one preserved to this day.

In 2005, the Red Building of the Zamu Central County Committee of the CCP was designated as a cultural relic protection unit by the People's Government of Tibet Autonomous Region. On April 25, 2010, as part of Tibet's Eleventh Five-Year Plan for key cultural relic protection projects, a restoration and environment improvement initiative for the Red Building was officially launched. In 2013, the site was elevated to the status of a national key cultural relic protection unit. In 2016, the Guangdong Provincial Bureau of Cultural Relics included the preservation planning for the Red Building as part of its technical assistance efforts to Tibet.

== Buildings ==
The Red Building of the Zamu Central County Committee of the CCP, located within the government compound in Bomi County, is a two-story wooden structure designed in an imitation Soviet style, named for its distinctive red exterior. The building is oriented north to south, measuring 38.4 meters in length from east to west and 13.4 meters in width from north to south, with a total floor area of 1,029.12 square meters. The structure contains 25 rooms in total, with 12 rooms on the first floor and 13 on the second.
