= Pomda Monastery =

Gelug monastery in Tibet

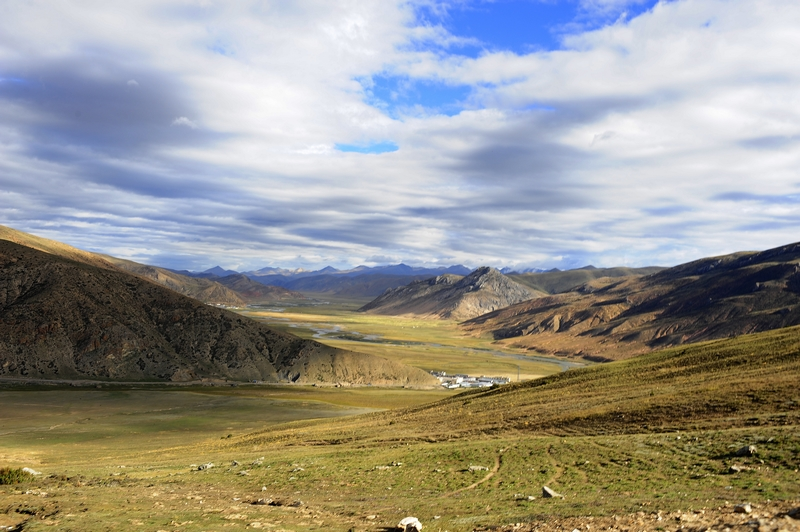
Village of Pomda

Bamda is a village and monastery in Baxoi County, Tibet. Pomda Monastery is a lamasery in Bomda. It was destroyed in 1959 by the Communist Chinese but rebuilt between 1984 and 1988. The monastery is around 360 years old and is home to 90 monks. The entrance hallway has a number of murals depicting monastic dress codes.

The 1922 "Travels of a consular officer in Eastern Tibet" by Eric Teichman describes arriving at the monastery as follows:

To-day we made another long march down the flat valley of the Yu Chu and reached Bomda Gomba, a typical grass-country monastery like Dzogchen, Nangchen, Seshii, and others, ... and distinguished by a particularly large heap of mani stones.
