= Bairiga =

Mountain in Tibet, China

- Ruoni
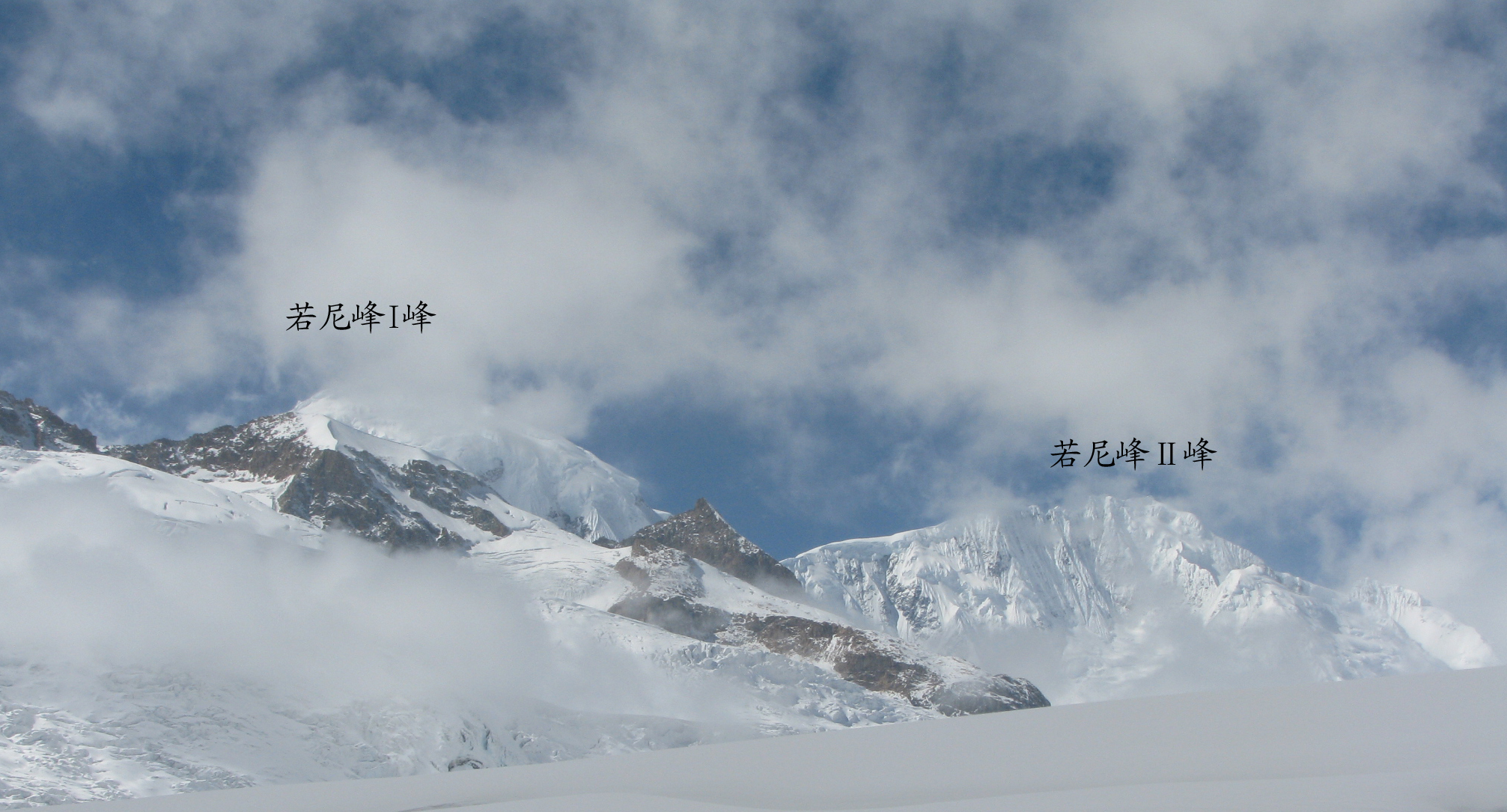
- Ruoni and Lopchin

Highest point
- Elevation: 6,882 m (22,579 ft)
- Prominence: 2,444 m (8,018 ft)
- Listing: Mountains of China; Ultra
- Coordinates: 29°09′57″N 96°43′27″E

Geography
- Location within Tibet Location within China
- Location: Tibet Autonomous Region, China
- Parent range: Kangri Garpo

Climbing
- First ascent: unclimbed
- Easiest route: snow/ice/glacier climb

Bairiga (Chinese: 白日嘎; pinyin: Bái Rì Gä) or Ruoni (Chinese: 若尼峰; pinyin: Ruò Ní Fēng) (6,882 m) is the highest peak of Kangri Garpo Range of southeast Tibet Autonomous Region.

== History ==
The region has only recently been explored, and before 2009 none of its 47 peaks above 6,000 m had been climbed. Bairiga / Ruoni, which remains unclimbed itself, was photographed for the first time in 1933 by the botanist explorer Frank Kingdon-Ward, at which time it was known as Choembo.

In October 2003, a Japanese team attempted to climb Ruoni I via the northeast ridge. Some progress was made above two different Camp Is but avalanche risk, a huge snow cornice and a 10 day snow fall stopped the team from finding a suitable route to the summit.

In 2009, a Sino-Japanese joint climbing team formed by China University of Geosciences (Wuhan) and Kobe University organized an expedition to climb Kangri Garpo II or Ruoni II (6,805 m). On November 5, Deqing Ouzhu and Ciren Danda, Tibetan students with the CUG, were the first to reach the summit, while Koichiro Kondo and Masanori Yazaki scaled the peak two days later. In consultation with a local village leader Kangri Garpo II was renamed Lopchin (Lopchin Feng in Tibetan, Lou bu qin in Chinese), meaning "white male hawk".

== See also ==
- List of ultras of Tibet, East Asia and neighbouring areas
