= Kingdom of Powo =

Former kingdom in Tibet

Kingdom of Powo ཀཿགནམ་རྒྱ་པོ kaH gnam rgyal po
- ca. 1330–1928
- Capital: Kanam (now Galang Village, Bomê County)
- Common languages: Tibetan, Tibetic languages
- Religion: Tibetan Buddhism
- Government: Monarchy
- History
  - Established: ca. 1330
  - Annexed by Qing China: 1910
  - Restored: 1911
  - Annexed by Tibet: 1928
Preceded by	Succeeded by
Tibet under Yuan rule	Tibet
- Today part of: China

The Kingdom of Powo or sPo bo (Tibetan: ཀཿགནམ་རྒྱ་པོ, Wylie: kaHgnam rgya po; Chinese: 波密土王) was a kingdom founded in the 13th century, located in present-day Bomê County, Tibet. The monarchs of Powo were descendants of Drigum Tsenpo, and used the title Kanam Gyalpo (kaH gnam rgyal po) or Kanam Depa (kaH gnam sde pa).

The kingdom was annexed by Qing China in 1910, but the King restored it the next year. In 1928, the kingdom was annexed by Tibet.

== Destruction ==
At the end of the Qing dynasty, the Bomi tribe frequently raided passing merchants and traveled through the country, leading to clashes with the Sichuan army. During the Tongzhi era and from 1879-1880, they repeatedly surrendered and betrayed the emperor. Relying on the rugged terrain and fierce local people, they frequently launched raids, robbery, and serious crimes such as arson and killing, occurring every year.

In 1910, the resident minister in Tibet, Lian Yu, sent deputy commander Zhong Ying to lead the new Tibetan army to suppress Bomi. However, Zhong Ying was a member of the imperial family and lacked command talent, and the new troops stationed in Tibet lacked combat experience, so they were defeated at Dongjiu (in present-day Nyingchi County). Lian Yu then appointed Luo Changjie, Left Counselor, and also petitioned to transfer Zhao Erfeng, the Sichuan and Yunnan border minister, to assist in the suppression. Fu Song, a subordinate under Zhao Erfeng, led his troops to capture Bomi and joined forces with Luo Changxi at Yigong (now part of Bomi County). King Baima Tsewang of Bomi fled to Motuo. Luo Changqing led his troops through Duoxiongla Pass into Motuo, reaching Bengbeng Mountain. Liu Zanting, commander of the Western Army Central Camp under Zhao Erfeng, led troops from Jinzhula Pass into Motuo. Motuozong Zongben (equivalent to county magistrate) and Daobu (a Menba person) plotted to lure and kill the King of Bomitu. The second Qing army eliminated the remaining leaders of Bomi and stationed troops there. Zhao Erfeng intended to establish a county in Bomi and change native chieftains to regular officials, but soon the Wuchang Uprising broke out and the plan was shelved.

After the Xinhai Revolution in 1911, the Qing troops stationed across Tibet mutinied and scattered, and the New Army withdrew from Bomi. Wangqin Dundui (also known as Sonam Wangjie), son-in-law of Baim Tsewang, returned to Bomi to proclaim himself king, assassinated Motuozong Bendaobu, and took revenge on the various tribal leaders who had supported the Qing army back then. Soon after, Wangqin Dundui's wife passed away. Kalun Charong of Tibet married his daughter Ciren Zhuoma to Wangchingdondui, and in 1924 wrote a letter inviting Wangqin Dundui and his wife to Lhasa for a "homevisit." On the way to Lhasa, Wangqin Dundui sensed a change in the situation and returned to Bomi, while Ciren Zhuoma fled to Lhasa with a large amount of valuables. Afterwards, the conflict between Bomi and Lhasa deepened day by day. In 1927, the seventh generation of the Tibetan army, Ben, led troops into Daxing but was killed by Wangqin Dundui, marking the official outbreak of war between the two sides. In 1928, Kashag sent five routes of Tibetan troops to attack Bomi. Wangqin Dundui fled to British India, where they were placed under house arrest. Later, the British side reported that Wangqington Stack had died of heatstroke. In 1932, the Kashag government gained full control of the Bomi region.

After Bomi was pacified, due to the military achievements of Sera Monastery, Qingduo Monastery, and Songzong Monastery, Kashag permitted the establishment of the Bomi Sect, Qingduo Sect, and Podui Sect, appointing their respective sect heads for administration. This continued until 1959, when Bomi was established as a county, becoming Bomi County.
