= Convention Between Great Britain and China Respecting Tibet =

1906 treaty between China and the United Kingdom

Convention of Peking (1906)
Convention Between Great Britain and China Respecting Tibet
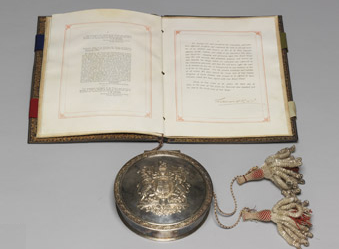
- Text of the Convention
- Type: Convention
- Signed: 27 April 1906; 119 years ago
- Location: Peking, Qing Empire
- Signatories: Tang Shaoyi; Ernest Mason Satow
- Parties: China; United Kingdom
- Ratifiers: Guangxu Emperor; King Edward VII

Full text
- Convention Between Great Britain and China Respecting Tibet at Wikisource

The Convention Between Great Britain and China Respecting Tibet (Chinese: 中英續訂藏印條約) was a treaty signed in Peking between the Qing dynasty and the British Empire in 1906 concerning Tibet. It was a follow-on to the 1904 Convention of Lhasa signed by the British Empire and Tibet after the British expedition to Tibet in 1903–1904. The new Convention reaffirmed the Chinese possession of Tibet. The British agreed not to annex or interfere in Tibet. China agreed to pay the indemnity due from Tibet and engaged "not to permit any other foreign state to interfere with the territory or internal administration of Tibet".

== Background ==
In 1904, after the British invasion of Tibet resulting in the exile of the 13th Dalai Lama, Britain signed the Convention of Lhasa with the Kashag and delegations of three major Tibetan monasteries. However, Qing Empire considered the convention "damaging to state sovereignty" and refused to ratify it.

In order to gain Chinese acceptance, subsequent negotiations were held in Calcutta in February 1905. During the negotiations, the Chinese representative, Tang Shaoyi, insisted that Britain recognize China's sovereignty over Tibet. However, the British representative maintained that China held only suzerainty over the region. This fundamental disagreement prevented the two sides from reaching a consensus.

After the Liberals took office in December 1905, the British government adopted a non-interference policy on Tibet and returned to the negotiating table in April 1906 in Peking. On April 27th, the two parties officially signed the treaty. Under the agreement, Britain consented to refrain from occupying Tibetan territories or interfering in Tibet's political affairs, while China retained the right to govern Tibet's internal affairs, and ensured that no other foreign powers would interfere in Tibetan matters.

== Aftermath ==
After signing the treaty, the Qing Empire, though not granted sovereignty over Tibet, gained a "virtually free hand" in the region, including exclusive control over its territory, internal affairs, officer detachments, commerce, and finances. In 1906, Zhang Yintang, appointed as the assistant amban for Tibet, leveraged the provisions of the 1906 convention to reassert control over Tibet and diminish British influence.

The British troops were withdrawn from the Chumbi Valley following the payment of the third installment from the Chinese government of the indemnity stipulated in the 1904 convention. The indemnity amount was reduced to one-third under the terms of the 1906 convention.

== See also ==
- Tibet under Qing rule
- Chinese expedition to Tibet (1720)
- British expedition to Tibet (1903–1904)
- Anglo-Russian Convention (1907)
- Chinese expedition to Tibet (1910)
- Simla Convention (1913–1914)

== Bibliography ==
- Marshall, Julie (2004-11-23). Britain and Tibet 1765-1947: A Select Annotated Bibliography of British Relations with Tibet and the Himalayan States including Nepal, Sikkim and Bhutan Revised and Updated to 2003. Routledge. ISBN 978-1-134-32785-0.
- Feng, Mingzhu (2007). 中英西藏交涉与川藏边情. 中国藏学出版社. ISBN 978-7-800-57934-9.
- Bell, Charles (1924). Tibet Past and Present (First ed.). Oxford University Press.
