= Tramog =

Tramog སྤྲ་རྨོག Tramo, Zhamog, Zhamo
- Town
- Zhamu
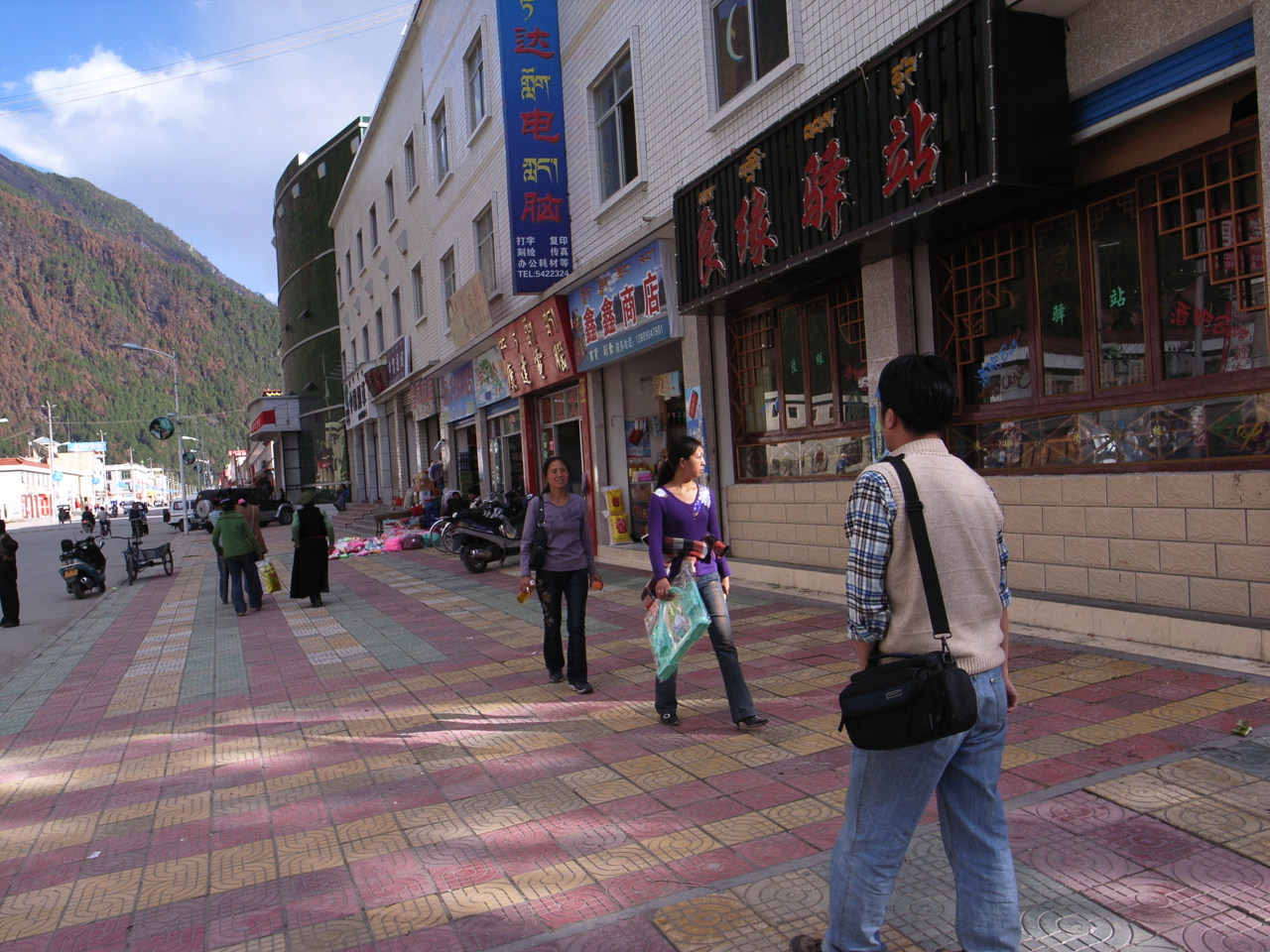

- Location in the Tibet Autonomous Region
- Coordinates: 29°51′34″N 95°46′05″E
- Country: People's Republic of China
- Autonomous Region: Tibet
- Prefecture-level city: Nyingchi
- County: Pome
- Elevation: 2,740 m (8,990 ft)

Population (2008)
  - Total: 11,000
  - Major Nationalities: Tibetan
  - Regional dialect: Tibetan language
- Time zone: UTC+8 (CST)
- Area code: 0894

Tramog or Tramo (Tibetan: ཁྲབ་རྨོག, Wylie: spra rmog, THL: tra mok), also called Zhamog or Zhamo in Chinese (Chinese: 扎木镇; pinyin: Zhā mù zhèn), is a town and the county seat of Pome County in the Nyingchi Prefecture, Tibet region of China. Being the county seat, it is also referred to as the Pome town or Pomi town.

== See also ==
- List of towns and villages in Tibet
