= Rawu =

Rawu 然乌镇
- Town
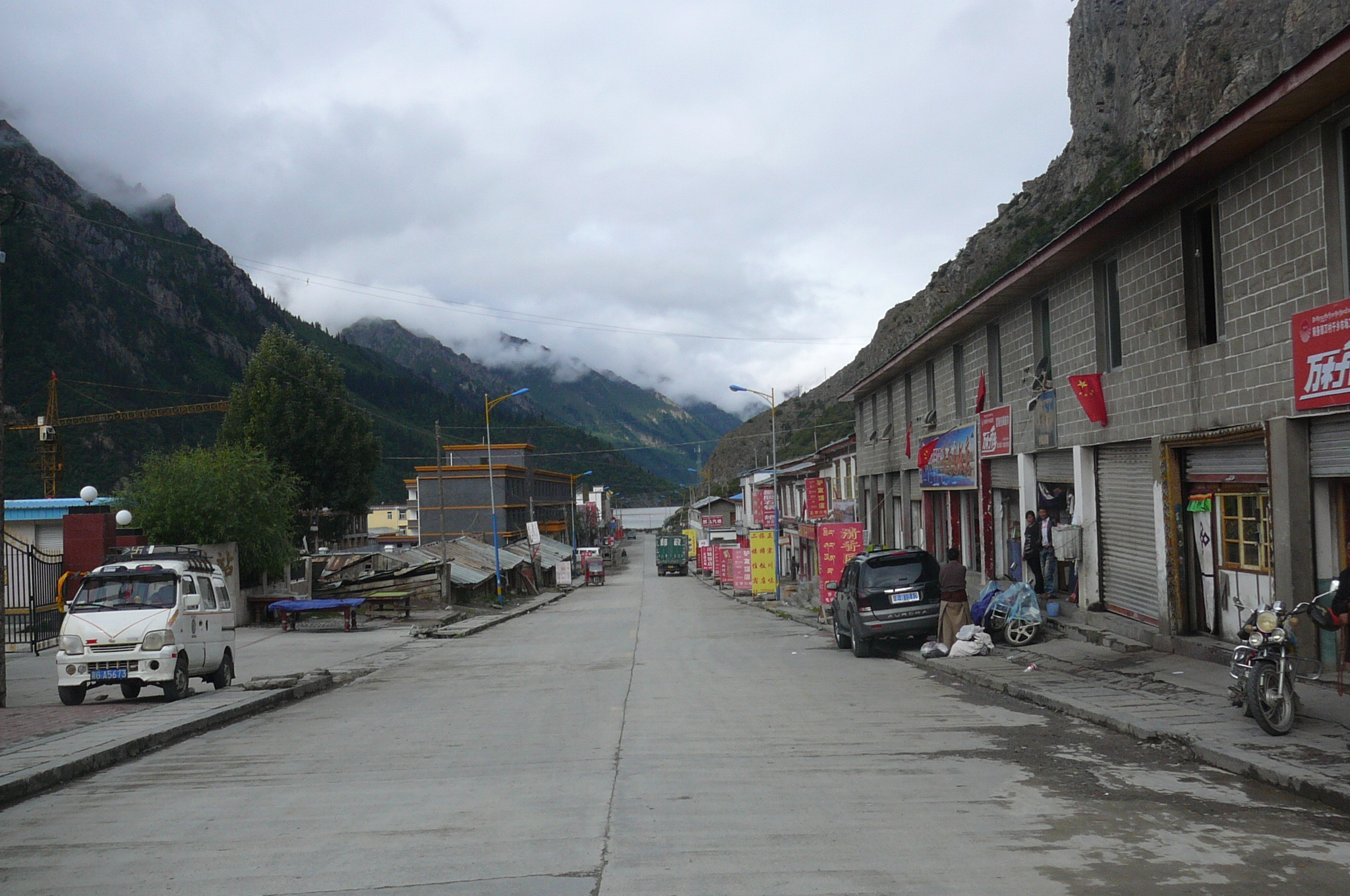
- A streetscape in Rawu

- Location within Tibet
- Coordinates: 29°30′18″N 96°45′23″E
- Country: China
- Autonomous region: Tibet Autonomous Region
- Prefecture-level city: Chamdo
- County: Pasho County
- Elevation: 3,970 m (13,020 ft)

Population (2010)
  - Total: 4,335

Rawu (simplified Chinese: 然乌镇; traditional Chinese: 然烏鎮; pinyin: Ránwū Zhèn), also known as Ravu or Rawok, is a town in Pasho County, Chamdo Prefecture, within the Tibet Autonomous Region of China. It sits at an altitude of about 3,970 m (13,020 ft). Located along the Rakwa Tso, the town hosts a growing tourism industry. The modern town is built beside an older village of the same name. Per the 2010 Chinese Census, Rawu has a population of 4,335.

== History ==
The Sichuan-Tibet portion of China National Highway 318 was constructed in the area during the 1950s, and was extended in the 1960s.

== Geography ==
The town of Rawu is quite close to the original Tibetan village. To the southeast of the village is a large chorten and a small temple overlooking the Rakwa Tso (also known as Ngan-tso, or Rawu Lake), which is surrounded by snow-capped peaks and forests. The lake is about 7 km (4.3 miles) from the town. It is 26 by 2 km (16.2 by 1.2 miles), and consists of two sections connected by a small stream. There are small villages on both shores.

== Demographics ==
Per the 2010 Chinese Census, Rawu has a population of 4,335, up from the 3,856 recorded in the 2000 Chinese Census. The modern town has a population of about 2,900.

== Economy ==
The town is located near Rakwa Tso, a major lake, and attracts many tourists. The main industry other than tourism is logging. Many of the town's shops and hotels draw business from loggers and workers from nearby military base.

== Transportation ==
Rawu sits along the Sichuan-Tibet portion of China National Highway 318.

== See also ==
- List of towns and villages in Tibet
- Pasho County
- Rakwa Tso
