= Lhorong County =

Lhorong County 洛隆县 • ལྷོ་རོང་རྫོང་།
- County
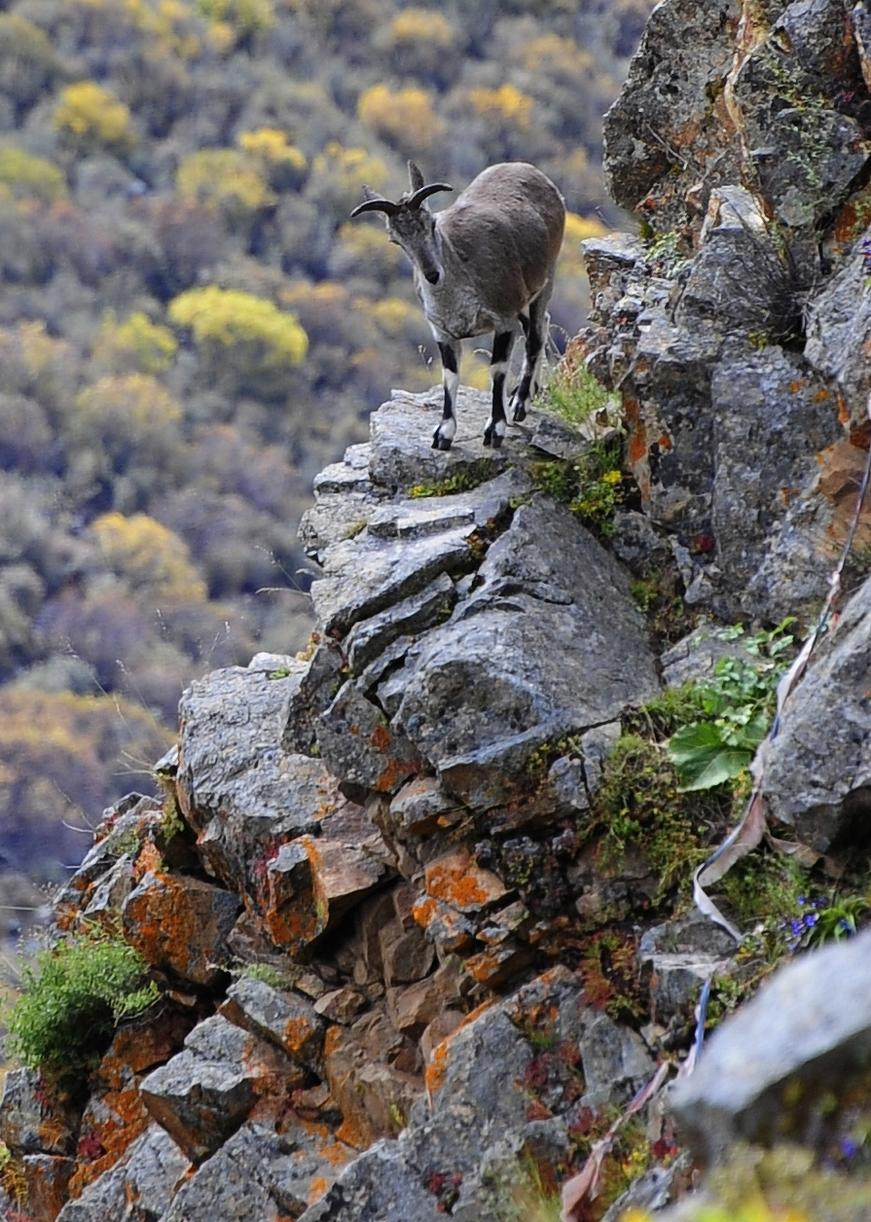
- Himalayan blue sheep

- Location of Lhorong County within Tibet

- Location in Tibet Lhorong County (China)
- Coordinates: 30°42′N 96°9′E
- Country: China
- Autonomous region: Tibet
- Prefecture-level city: Chamdo
- County seat: Dzito (Lhorong)

Area
  - Total: 8,060.36 km^{2} (3,112.12 sq mi)

Population (2020)
  - Total: 53,185
  - Density: 6.5983/km^{2} (17.090/sq mi)
- Time zone: UTC+8 (China Standard)
- Website: luolong.changdu.gov.cn

Lhorong County

Chinese name
- Simplified Chinese: 洛隆县
- Traditional Chinese: 洛隆縣
Transcriptions
Standard Mandarin
- Hanyu Pinyin: Luòlóng Xiàn

Tibetan name
- Tibetan: ལྷོ་རོང་རྫོང་།
Transcriptions
- Wylie: lho rong rdzong
- Tibetan Pinyin: Lhorong Zong

Lhorong County (Tibetan: ལྷོ་རོང་རྫོང་།, Chinese: 洛隆县) is a county of Chamdo in the Tibet Autonomous Region, China. The county covers an area of 8,108 km^{2} (3,131 sq mi) and has a population of around 40,000 as of 2003. The word Lhorong means "valley in the south" or "river in the south" in Tibetan.

== Geography and climate ==
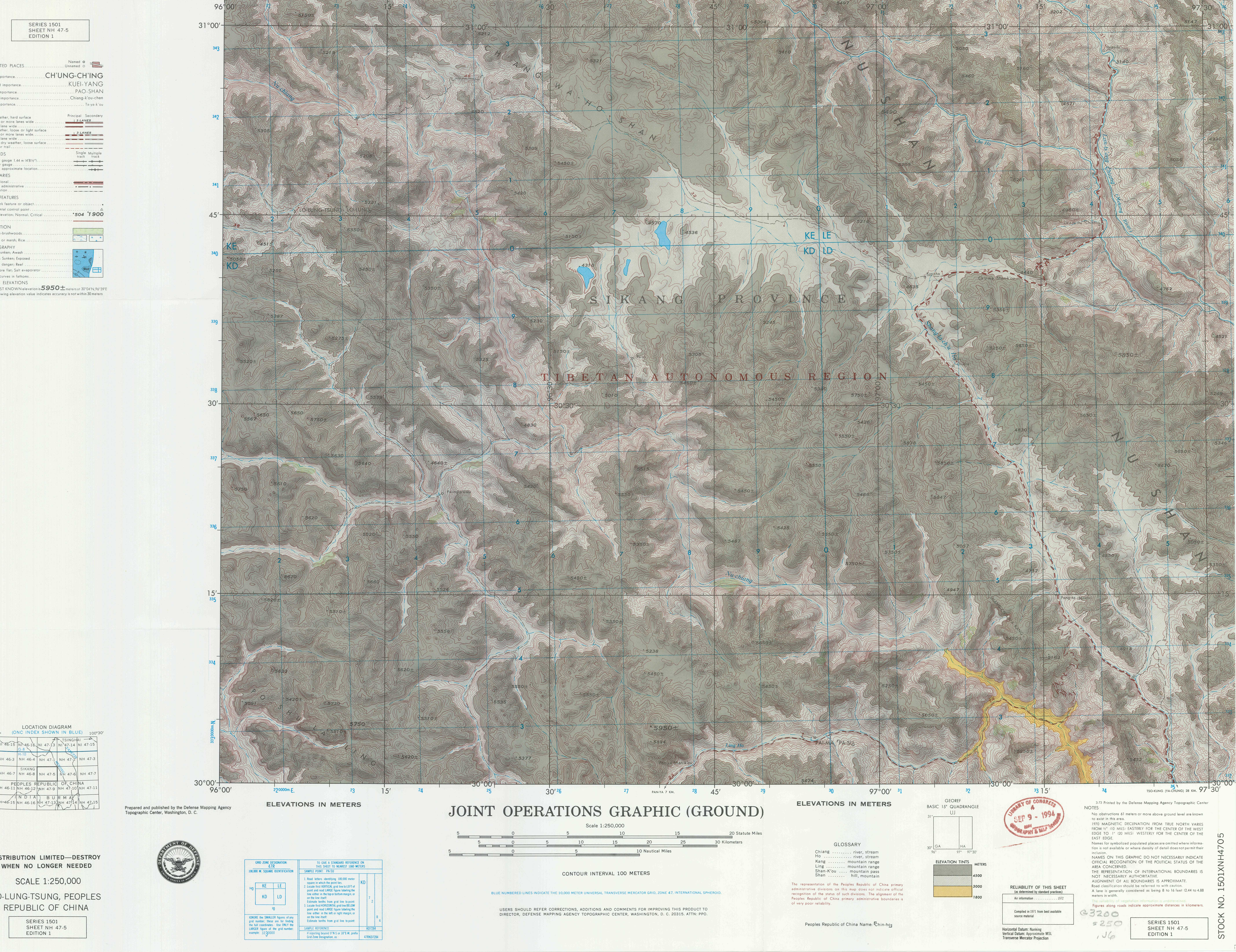

Lhorong County is located in the northeast of the Tibet Autonomous Region, in the eastern Qinghai-Tibet Plateau and contains some 100 kilometres or 60 miles of the Nu River (Salween River). The Nu River flows through Tibet into Gongshan Dulong and Nu Autonomous County of Yunnan Province. It later flows through Lushui County and into Myanmar, eventually into the Indian Ocean. Lhorong County lies to the south-west of the Qamdo Prefecture. Banbar County lies to the northwest, Baxoi County lies across the river to the east, Banbar County to the west, Dêngqên County to the north, and Riwoqê County to the northeast. From east to west the county is 127 kilometers and from north to south the greatest distance of is 105 kilometres. A county has a total area of 8048.4 square kikometres. The total population is around 36,000 people (1999), with estimates in 2003 being around 40,000. Other rivers of Lhorong County include the Jalan Song, Maqu, and the Zhuoma Lang. The county also contains numerous small lakes which the locals compare to 21 fairies.

Not untypically for the "river region" of Tibet, the county has a dry-winter humid continental climate (Köppen Dwb), bordering on a cool semi-arid climate (BSk). The average annual temperature is 6.1 °C or 43.0 °F, the midsummer (July) average 14.5 °C or 58.1 °F, and the midwinter (January) mean −3.5 °C or 25.7 °F. The country experiences 2,500 hours of sunshine annually on average, with a frost-free period of 120 days or so. The annual average rainfall is 416.1 millimetres or 16.38 inches.

Climate data for Lhorong, elevation 3,612 m (11,850 ft), (1991–2020 normals, extremes 1981–present)
Month	Jan	Feb	Mar	Apr	May	Jun	Jul	Aug	Sep	Oct	Nov	Dec	Year
Record high °C (°F)	19.6 (67.3)	17.0 (62.6)	19.1 (66.4)	20.8 (69.4)	25.6 (78.1)	27.3 (81.1)	30.6 (87.1)	28.8 (83.8)	27.4 (81.3)	24.7 (76.5)	19.0 (66.2)	16.5 (61.7)	30.6 (87.1)
Mean daily maximum °C (°F)	5.1 (41.2)	6.7 (44.1)	9.6 (49.3)	13.2 (55.8)	17.1 (62.8)	20.7 (69.3)	22.3 (72.1)	22.0 (71.6)	20.0 (68.0)	14.5 (58.1)	9.9 (49.8)	6.7 (44.1)	14.0 (57.2)
Daily mean °C (°F)	−3.5 (25.7)	−1.0 (30.2)	2.2 (36.0)	5.6 (42.1)	9.8 (49.6)	13.6 (56.5)	15.0 (59.0)	14.3 (57.7)	12.2 (54.0)	6.8 (44.2)	1.2 (34.2)	−2.6 (27.3)	6.1 (43.0)
Mean daily minimum °C (°F)	−10.9 (12.4)	−8.0 (17.6)	−4.1 (24.6)	−0.5 (31.1)	3.6 (38.5)	7.9 (46.2)	9.5 (49.1)	8.8 (47.8)	6.4 (43.5)	0.8 (33.4)	−5.8 (21.6)	−10.1 (13.8)	−0.2 (31.6)
Record low °C (°F)	−22.1 (−7.8)	−20.6 (−5.1)	−18.1 (−0.6)	−10.0 (14.0)	−5.8 (21.6)	−0.6 (30.9)	0.6 (33.1)	0.3 (32.5)	−2.2 (28.0)	−9.3 (15.3)	−18.2 (−0.8)	−21.9 (−7.4)	−22.1 (−7.8)
Average precipitation mm (inches)	2.4 (0.09)	7.2 (0.28)	14.1 (0.56)	27.7 (1.09)	43.6 (1.72)	61.1 (2.41)	80.4 (3.17)	76.8 (3.02)	59.5 (2.34)	34.7 (1.37)	6.9 (0.27)	1.7 (0.07)	416.1 (16.39)
Average precipitation days (≥ 0.1 mm)	2.0	4.5	8.0	11.3	11.8	13.9	16.8	16.4	13.2	8.5	4.4	2.1	112.9
Average snowy days	3.8	6.8	11.4	13.1	3.2	0.1	0	0.1	0.4	5.7	6.5	3.6	54.7
Average relative humidity (%)	42	43	48	52	52	57	61	62	60	56	49	43	52
Mean monthly sunshine hours	217.5	204.9	223.1	212.6	236.5	203.7	185.6	184.9	203.7	218.3	215.5	214.2	2,520.5
Percentage possible sunshine	67	65	60	55	56	48	43	46	56	63	69	68	58
Source: China Meteorological Administrationall-time October record

== Subdivisions ==
Lhorong County contains 4 towns and 7 townships.

Name	Chinese	Hanyu Pinyin	Tibetan	Wylie
Towns
Dzito Town (Lhorong)	孜托镇	Zītuō zhèn	རྫི་ཐོ་གྲོང་རྡལ།	rdzi tho grong rdal
Xobando Town	硕督镇	Shuòdū zhèn	ཤོ་པ་མདོ་གྲོང་རྡལ།	sho pa mdo grong rdal
Khangsar Town	康沙镇	Kāngshā zhèn	ཁང་གསར་གྲོང་རྡལ།	khang gsar grong rdal
Marri Town	马利镇	Mǎlì zhèn	དམར་རི་གྲོང་རྡལ།	dmar ri grong rdal
Townships
Dakrong Township	达龙乡	Dálóng xiāng	གདགས་རོང་ཤང་།	gdags rong shang
Shingrong Township	新荣乡	Xīnróng xiāng	ཤིང་རོང་ཤང་།	shing rong shang
Pedak Township	白达乡	Báidá xiāng	པད་གདགས་ཤང་།	pad gdags shang
Yülzhi Township	玉西乡	Yùxī xiāng	ཡུལ་བཞི་ཤང་།	yul bzhi shang
Nagchok Township	腊久乡	Làjiǔ xiāng	ནག་ལྕོག་ཤང་།	nag lcog shang
Ngülshö Township	俄西乡	Éxī xiāng	རྔུལ་ཤོད་ཤང་།	rngul shod shang
Kungye Sumdo Township	中亦乡	Zhōngyì xiāng	ཀུང་ཡས་གསུམ་མདོ་ཤང་།	kung yas gsum mdo shang
