= Bomê County =

Pome County 波密县 • སྤོ་མེས་རྫོང་ Bomê
- County
- Bomê County
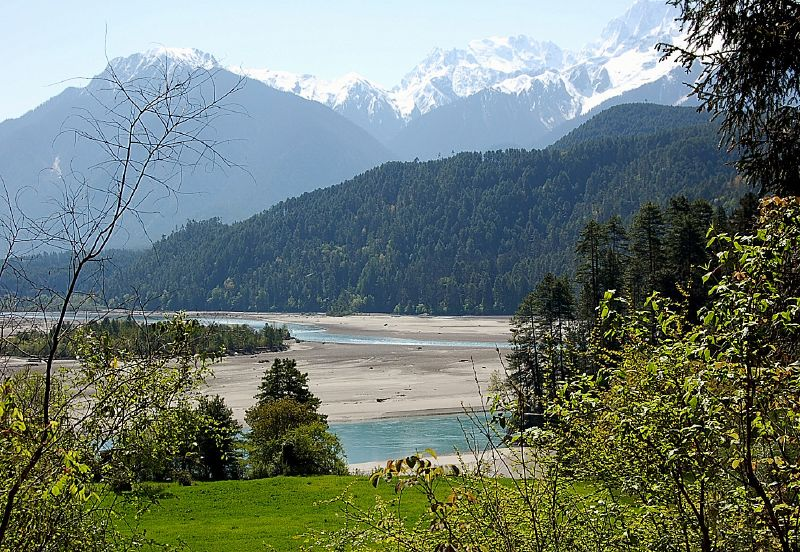
- Gangxiang Nature Reserve

- Location of the seat in Tibet Pome (China)
- Coordinates: 29.850°N 95.775°E
- Country: China
- Autonomous region: Tibet
- Prefecture-level city: Nyingchi
- County seat: Tramog

Area
  - Total: 16,072 km^{2} (6,205 sq mi)

Population (2020)
  - Total: 34,858
  - Density: 2.1689/km^{2} (5.6173/sq mi)
- Time zone: UTC+8 (China Standard)
- Website: www.bomi.gov.cn

Bomê County

Chinese name
- Simplified Chinese: 波密县
- Traditional Chinese: 波密縣
Transcriptions
Standard Mandarin
- Hanyu Pinyin: Bōmì Xiàn
Yue: Cantonese
- Jyutping: bo^{1}mat^{6} jyun^{2}

Tibetan name
- Tibetan: སྤོ་མེས་རྫོང་
Transcriptions
- Wylie: spo mes rdzong
- THL: po mé dzong
- Tibetan Pinyin: Bomê Zong

Bomê County or Pome County (Tibetan: སྤོ་མེས་རྫོང; Chinese: 波密县) is a county of Nyingchi Prefecture in the south-east of the Tibet Autonomous Region. Historically known as Powo or Poyul, it was the seat of a quasi-independent kingdom until the early 20th century when troops of the Dalai Lama's Lhasa government integrated it into the central Tibetan realm. The population was 25,897 in 2004.

== Geography ==
The region of Powo or Poyul, which is now constituted as the Pome County, lies to the northeast of the Tsangpo gorge, where the Yarlung Tsangpo (Brahmaputra) river turns abruptly to the south on its course towards India.

Two major rivers Yi'ong Tsangpo and Parlung Tsangpo flow into the Pome County from opposite directions to join near Tang-me. The combined river (called Yi'ong Tsangpo) exits the Pome County to the south to join Yarlung Tsangpo near Mount Gyala Peri.

The lower reaches of these two rivers constitute Po-me or Lower Powo.

Po-to or Upper Powo consists of the basin of another river Poto Tsangpo, which originates within the Pome County, along with its tributary Yarlung Chu. Poto Tsangpo joins Parlung Tsangpo to the west of the "Pome Town" (Tramog).

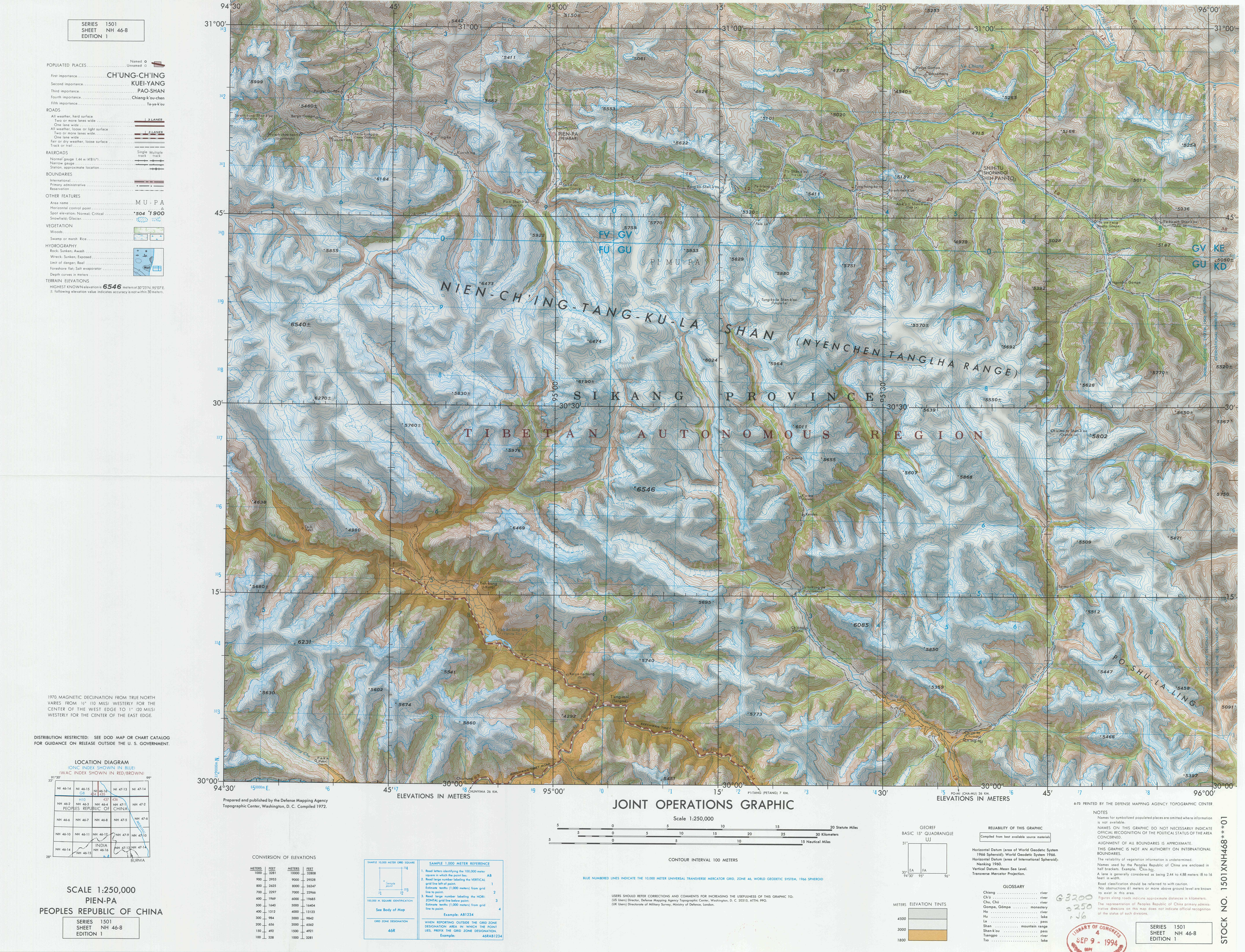
NH 46-8: Pienpa China (DMA, 1977)

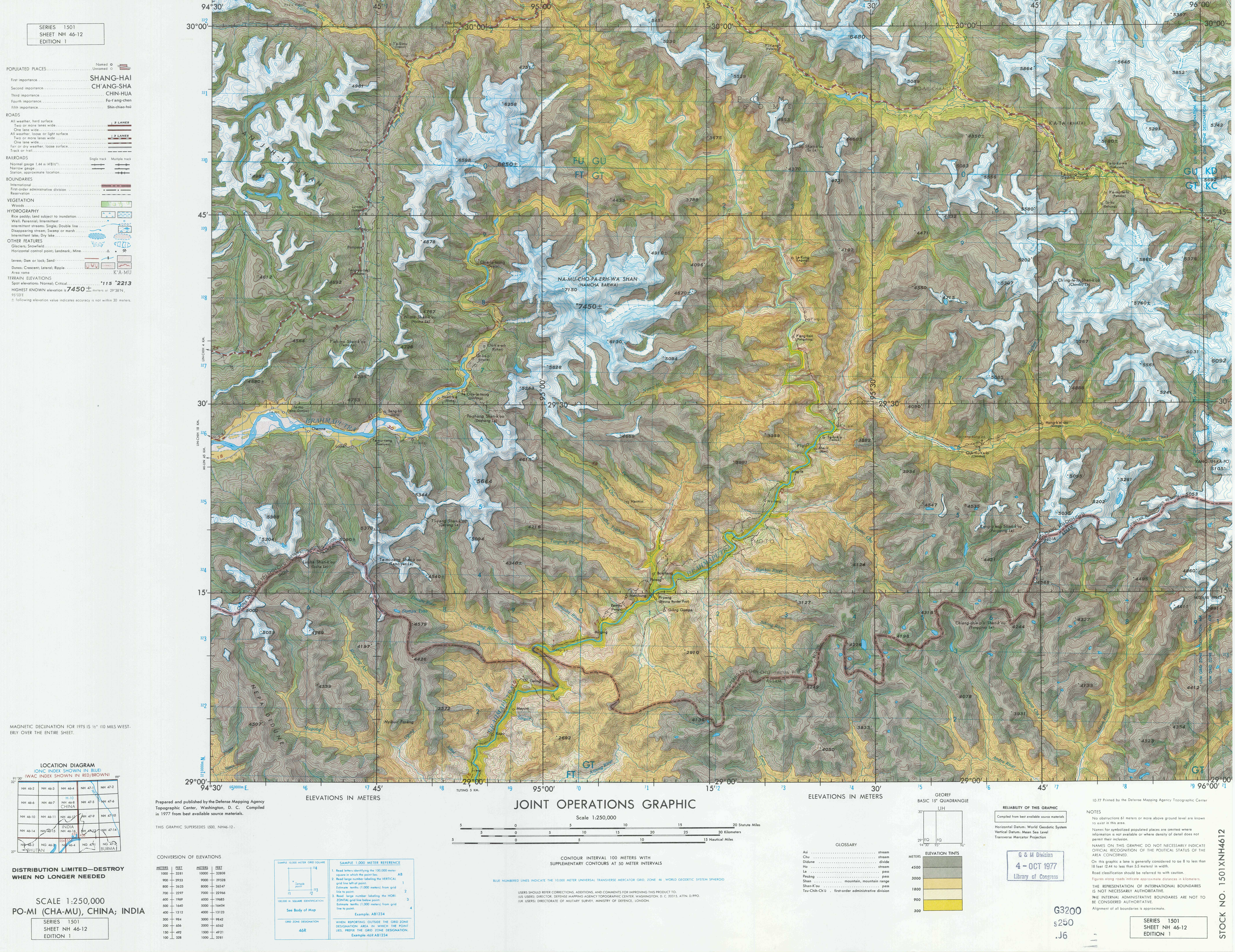
NH 46-12: Pomi China (DMA, 1977)

== History ==
The Kingdom of Powo, or sPo yul ("country of sPo") was an offshoot of the ancient dynasty of the first Tibetan kings of the Yarlung Valley. Its inhabitants had a reputation as fearsome savages, which meant most travelers kept clear of it and so it was one of the least known areas in the Tibetan traditional feudal establishment.

Its isolation was also enhanced by the belief by a great number of Tibetans that in its borders was one of the 'hidden lands' or beyul (Standard Tibetan: sbas-yul) referred to in the prophecies of Guru Rinpoche. Poba's area of control far exceeded the boundaries of Pome County. The kingdom acted as a protecting power for the streams of Tibetan pilgrims searching for this Promised Land in the East Himalayas from the Lopa tribes (Assam Himalayan tribes) from the mid-seventeenth century. Its power extended south over the Doshong La pass, to include the location of one of these earthly paradises called "Padma bkod" (written variously Pema köd, Pemakö and Pemako), literally 'Lotus Array', a region in the North-Eastern Province of Upper Siang of Arunachal Pradesh. Accounts of this terrestrial paradise influenced James Hilton's Shangri-La. A period of instability overtook the kingdom after Chinese incursions in 1905 and 1911.

The Bomi region has predominantly been semi-autonomous since the Tubo era. During the Qing Dynasty, governance was effectively under the authority of the King of Bomi. In 1910, the last Qing amban Lian Yu, dispatched forces to eradicate the Bomê soil king. In 1911, nine counties were established in Bomê. In 1928, the Kashag government dispatched forces to evict the son-in-law of the Bomê soil monarch, resulting in the complete integration of the Bomê region into Tibet. By 1931 the Lhasa government had expelled the last Ka gnam sde pa ('king') and established two garrisons.

In 1951, the People's Republic of China established the Second office in Chamdo, and in 1960, the three dzongs of Dzongdor, Boqu, and Yigong were consolidated and restructured into Bomê County.

== Climate ==
Pome has a monsoon-influenced oceanic climate (Köppen climate classification Cwb). The average annual temperature in Pome is 9.0 °C (48.2 °F). The average annual rainfall is 890.9 mm (35.07 in) with June as the wettest month. The temperatures are highest on average in July, at around 16.9 °C (62.4 °F), and lowest in January, at around 0.7 °C (33.3 °F).

Climate data for Bomê County, elevation 2,736 m (8,976 ft), (1991–2020 normals, extremes 1981–present)
Month	Jan	Feb	Mar	Apr	May	Jun	Jul	Aug	Sep	Oct	Nov	Dec	Year
Record high °C (°F)	17.8 (64.0)	19.1 (66.4)	21.9 (71.4)	25.3 (77.5)	28.1 (82.6)	30.2 (86.4)	32.4 (90.3)	31.0 (87.8)	29.5 (85.1)	25.4 (77.7)	22.1 (71.8)	16.1 (61.0)	32.4 (90.3)
Mean daily maximum °C (°F)	8.9 (48.0)	10.4 (50.7)	12.5 (54.5)	16.0 (60.8)	19.3 (66.7)	21.8 (71.2)	23.8 (74.8)	23.9 (75.0)	21.3 (70.3)	16.8 (62.2)	13.4 (56.1)	10.3 (50.5)	16.5 (61.7)
Daily mean °C (°F)	0.9 (33.6)	3.2 (37.8)	5.8 (42.4)	9.0 (48.2)	12.3 (54.1)	15.5 (59.9)	17.2 (63.0)	16.9 (62.4)	14.6 (58.3)	9.9 (49.8)	4.9 (40.8)	1.4 (34.5)	9.3 (48.7)
Mean daily minimum °C (°F)	−4.8 (23.4)	−1.9 (28.6)	1.3 (34.3)	4.2 (39.6)	7.5 (45.5)	11.3 (52.3)	12.7 (54.9)	12.5 (54.5)	10.6 (51.1)	5.7 (42.3)	−0.5 (31.1)	−4.5 (23.9)	4.5 (40.1)
Record low °C (°F)	−14.5 (5.9)	−12.0 (10.4)	−10.1 (13.8)	−4.4 (24.1)	−1.7 (28.9)	2.2 (36.0)	4.2 (39.6)	4.6 (40.3)	0.4 (32.7)	−5.7 (21.7)	−10.0 (14.0)	−13.7 (7.3)	−14.5 (5.9)
Average precipitation mm (inches)	5.0 (0.20)	27.0 (1.06)	85.7 (3.37)	112.6 (4.43)	116.0 (4.57)	127.1 (5.00)	105.3 (4.15)	89.2 (3.51)	103.9 (4.09)	84.4 (3.32)	17.5 (0.69)	4.8 (0.19)	878.5 (34.58)
Average precipitation days (≥ 0.1 mm)	4.0	8.2	16.3	17.7	20.1	23.6	23.4	22.3	22.3	15.6	6.1	3.2	182.8
Average snowy days	6.6	8.4	5.1	0.9	0.1	0	0	0	0.1	0.2	1.4	3.8	26.6
Average relative humidity (%)	60	63	70	70	71	76	76	75	78	76	68	62	70
Mean monthly sunshine hours	144.9	119.8	120.8	119.7	122.8	94.3	116.0	120.5	92.7	104.5	137.9	157.9	1,451.8
Percentage possible sunshine	45	38	32	31	29	22	27	30	25	30	44	50	34
Source: China Meteorological Administrationall-time extreme temperatureall-time November record high

== Administrative divisions ==
Bomê County contains 3 towns and 7 townships.

Name	Chinese	Hanyu Pinyin	Tibetan	Wylie
Towns
Zhamo Town (Tramog)	扎木镇	Zhāmù zhèn	སྤྲ་རྨོག་གྲོང་རྡལ།	sprag rmog grong rdal
Chumdo Town	倾多镇	Qīngduō zhèn	ཆུ་མདོ་གྲོང་རྡལ།	chu mdo grong rdal
Sumzom Town	松宗镇	Sōngzōng zhèn	གསུམ་འཛོམས་གྲོང་རྡལ།	gsum 'dzoms grong rdal
Townships
Yi'ong Township	易贡乡	Yìgòng xiāng	ཡིད་འོང་ཤང་།	yid 'ong shang
Yupuk Township	玉普乡	Yùpǔ xiāng	གཡུ་ཕུག་ཤང་།	gyu phug shang
Kangyul Township	康玉乡	Kāngyù xiāng	ཁང་ཡུལ་ཤང་།	khang yul shang
Dorjé Township	多吉乡	Duōjí xiāng	རྡོ་རྗེ་ཤང་།	rdo rje shang
Shulmo Township	玉许乡	Yùxǔ xiāng	ཤུལ་མོ་ཤང་།	shul mo shang
Paggai Township	八盖乡	Bāgài xiāng	བྲག་སྐས་ཤང་།	brag skas shang
Gu Township	古乡	Gǔ xiāng	དགུ་ཤང་།	dgu shang

== Transport ==
- China National Highway 318

== Tourism ==
- Red Building of the Zamu Central County Committee

== Bibliography ==
- Lamb, Alastair (1966), The McMahon Line: a Study in the Relations Between, India, China and Tibet, 1904 to 1914, Vol. 2: Hardinge, McMahon and the Simla Conference, Routledge & K. Paul – via archive.org
- Mehra, Parshotam (1974), The McMahon Line and After: A Study of the Triangular Contest on India's North-eastern Frontier Between Britain, China and Tibet, 1904–47, Macmillan, ISBN 9780333157374 – via archive.org
