= Parlung Tsangpo =

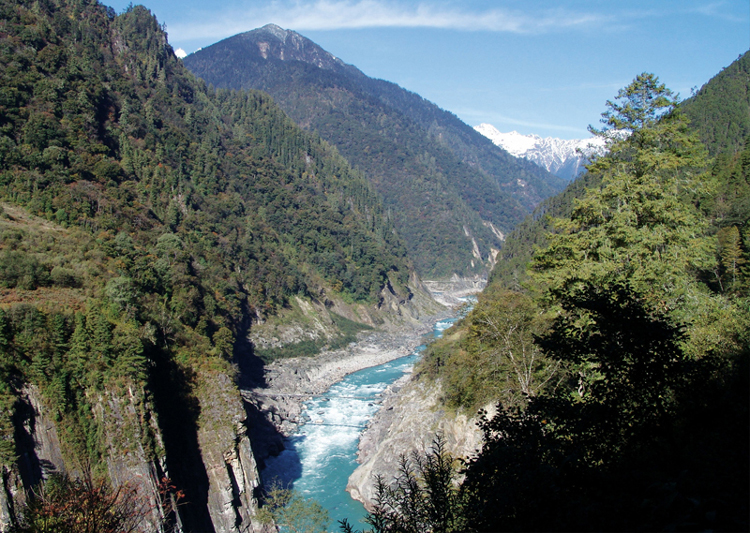
- Parlung Tsangpo, just below the confluence of the tributary, Lhayue Chu (拉月曲), followed by China National Highway 318
- Native name: ཕར་ལུང་གཙང་པོ (Standard Tibetan); 帕隆藏布 (Chinese)

Location
- Country: China
- State: Tibet Autonomous Region
- Region: Nyingchi Prefecture

Physical characteristics
- Source
  - location: China
- Mouth
  - coordinates: 29°52′35″N 95°7′23″E
- Length: 266 km (165 mi)

Basin features
- River system: Yarlung Tsangpo

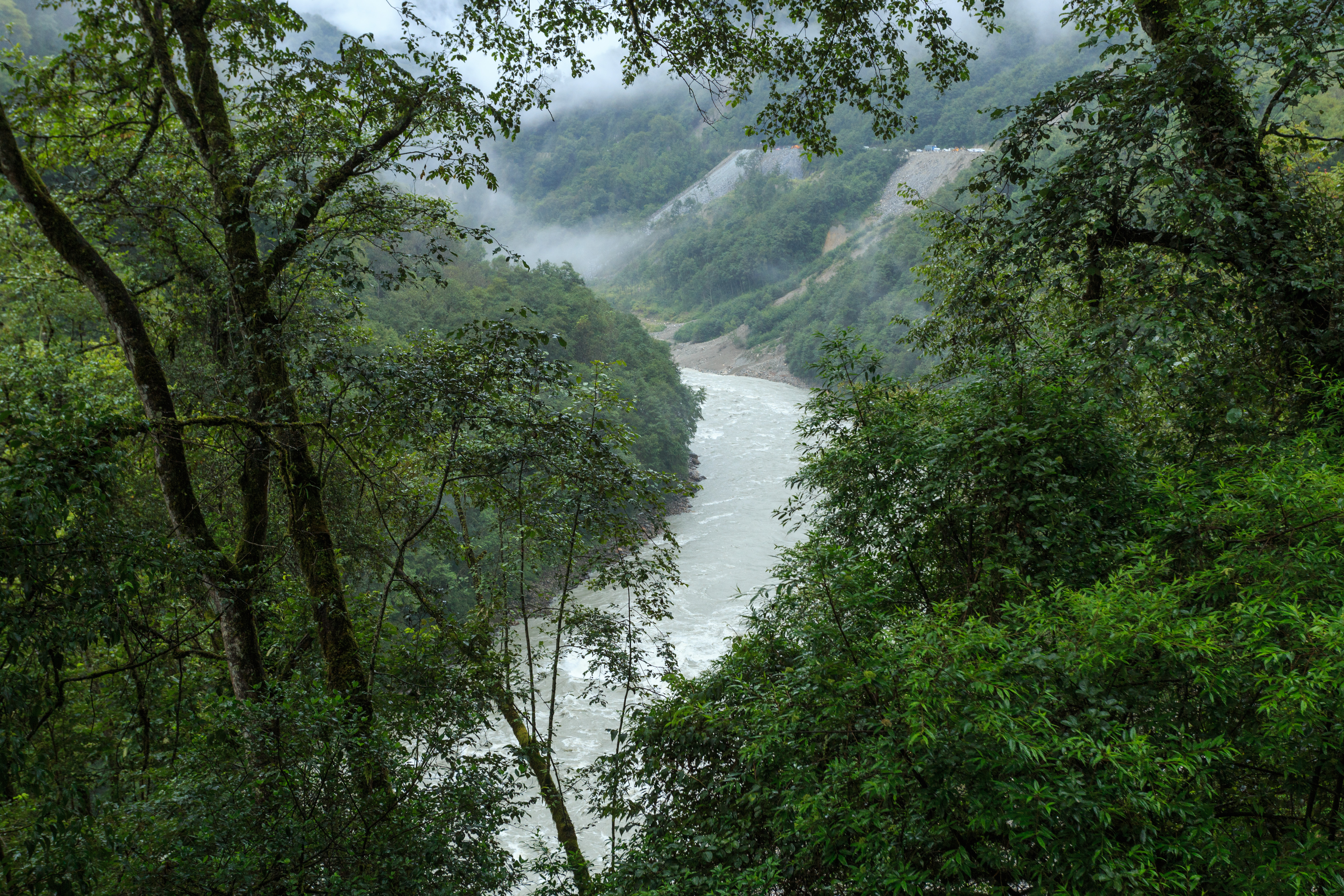
Parlung Tsangpo in Bomê.

Parlung Tsangpo or Parlung Zangbo (Tibetan: ཕར་ལུང་གཙང་པོ, Wylie: phar lung gtsang po; Chinese: 帕隆藏布; pinyin: Pàlóng Zàngbù), also known as Palongzangbu River, is a river in Nyingchi, Tibet, China. It is the largest tributary on the left side of Yarlung Tsangpo. Its source is the Arza Gongla Glacier, at an elevation of 4900m. It first flows north into Ngagung Tso, then turn northwest to Rakwa Tso. It joins Yarlung Tsangpo near Bomê.

The total length of Parlung Tsangpo is 266 km, and the drop of elevation is 3360m. The drainage basin covers an area of 23,800 square kilometers. The lower part of Parlung flows through the Parlung Tsangpo Valley, which is among the deepest in the world.
