= Timeline of Bhutanese history =

Bhutanese history timeline

This is a timeline of Bhutanese history, comprising important legal and territorial changes and political events in Bhutan and its predecessor states.

== 7th century ==
Year	Date	Event
627		Tibetan ruler Songtsän Gampo (reigned 627–49) ordered the construction of many Buddhist temples, including two in Bhutan: Jambay Lhakhang at Bumthang in central Bhutan, and Kyichu Lhakhang on the Kyi River in the Paro Valley. The construction of these temples marked the arrival of Buddhism in Bhutan. (to 649)

== 8th century ==
Year	Date	Event
747		Buddhist saint Padmasambhava, known as "Guru Rimpoche", comes to Bhutan from India at the invitation of Sindhu Raja of the Kingdom of Bumthang, one of the numerous kingdoms predating modern Bhutan. Padmasambhava converts the king to Buddhism and then continues to Tibet. When he returns to Bhutan at the invitation of Trisong Detsen, he oversees the construction of new monasteries in the Paro Valley and sets up his headquarters in Jakar. According to tradition, Padmasambhava thus founds the Nyingma, or "Red Hat," sect of Vajrayana Buddhism. Padmasambhava plays a great historical and religious role as the national patron saint who revealed the tantras to Bhutan. He returned for a third visit during the reign of Murthi Tsenpo (764–817), son of Trisong Detsen.

== 9th century ==
Year	Date	Event
807		Alternate date for Padmasambhava's invitation to Bhutan by Sindhu Raja. Naguchhi's sons spread the realm into parts of modern Sikkim and Tibet.
809		Padmasambhava comes again to Bhutan. Around the same time, independent monarchies develop.
824		Tibetan King Ralpacan (reigned 816–836), grandson of Trisong Detsen, goes to war with an Indian people ruler in Bhutan, driving him out. Tibetan troops who remained in Bhutan were called Milog, meaning "those that will not return." The region they settle is referred to as Tshochhen Gyed. Its eight parts or divisions are Wang, Be, Med, Kawang, Chang, Thi, Thim, and Lar.
836		Tibetan King Ralpacan is murdered by agents of his brother Langdarma. Tibetans seek refuge in Bhutan from ensuing political and religious upheaval during the reign of Langdarma (836–842). After Langdarma's assassination in 842, Tibetans continue to flee to western Bhutan, thus creating the homeland of the modern Ngalop people. The centuries that follow, known in Tibet as the Era of Fragmentation, are characterized by their lack of political cohesion. During much of this period, the dominant Bhutanese polity was the Kingdom of Bumthang.
900		In the late 9th century, ethnic Tibetan forces expel Indian people princes from parts of modern Bhutan. Tibetans in this period and location develop the roots of Ngalong culture.

== 10th century ==
Year	Date	Event
1000		By the 11th century, Tibetan-Mongol forces occupy the whole of Tibet. More waves of Tibetans seek refuge in Bhutan from religious persecution. Charismatic lamas become the de facto leaders of regions in western Bhutan.

== 11th century ==
Year	Date	Event
1143		Before the arrival of Phajo Druggom, the followers of Nyoe Gyalwa Lhanangpa, a disciple of Kyobpa Jigten Sumgon (1143–1217), the founder of the Drikung Kagyud, known as Lhapa had great influence and controlled a large part of western Bhutan.

== 12th century ==
Year	Date	Event
1180		Tibetan lama Tsangpa Gyare (1161–1211) founds Ralung Monastery for the Drukpa Lineage of the Kagyu school, named after the thunder dragons (druk) he witnessed on his quest for an appropriate foundation site. With the proliferation of the Drukpa, the druk become synonymous with Bhutan and later its central national symbol.

== 14th century ==
Year	Date	Event
1360		Gelug monks flee to Bhutan from Tibet.

== 15th century ==
Year	Date	Event
1475		Pema Lingpa, a Bhutanese religious figure and tertön from Bumthang, discovered his first terma from Lake Membar near Bumthang.

== 17th century ==
Year	Date	Event
1616		Ngawang Namgyal, 1st Zhabdrung Rinpoche, facing arrest and following visions in which it is said that the chief guardian deities of Bhutan offered him a home, leaves Tibet to establish a new base in western Bhutan, founding Chagri Monastery at the head of the Thimphu Valley.
1627		Shabdrung Ngawang Namgyal builds Simtokha Dzong at the entrance to Thimphu valley. From this dzong, he exerts control over traffic between the powerful Paro Valley to the west and Trongsa Valley to the east.
1627		Circa 1627, during the first war with Tibet, Portuguese Jesuits Estêvão Cacella and João Cabral were the first recorded Europeans to visit Bhutan on their way to Tibet. They met with Ngawang Namgyal, presented him with firearms, gunpowder and a telescope, and offered him their services in the war against Tibet, but the Zhabdrung declined the offer. After a stay of nearly eight months, Cacella wrote a long letter from Chagri Monastery reporting the travel. This is a rare remaining direct report of the Zhabdrung.
1629		Attempted Tibetan invasion fails.
1631		Attempted Tibetan invasion fails.
1634		Ngawang Namgyal prevails in the Battle of Five Lamas over the Tibetan Empire and Bhutanese forces allied against him. The Zhabdrung is thus the first to unite Bhutan into a single country. The Zhabdrung establishes the Drukpa Lineage as the state religion under the dual system of government, and codifies the system of laws known as the Tsa Yig, based on Buddhist religious law (dharma).
1639		Attempted Tibetan invasion fails.
1643		A joint Mongol-Tibetan force sought to destroy Nyingma refugees who had fled to Bhutan, Sikkim, and Nepal. The Mongols had seized control of religious and civil power in Tibet in the 1630s and established the Gelug school as the state religion. Bhutanese rivals of Ngawang Namgyal encouraged the Mongol intrusion, but the Mongol force was easily defeated in the humid lowlands of southern Bhutan.
1647		Attempted Tibetan invasion fails.
1651		Ngawang Namgyal dies; however, his death is kept a secret for fifty-four years in order to keep Bhutan from disintegrating. While the Zhabdrung was supposedly away on an extended religious retreat, his son reigned.
1680		Bhutan invades Sikkim. The same year, Ngawang Namgyal's son is succeeded by the Zhabdrung's stepbrother.
1700		Bhutan invades Sikkim.

== 18th century ==
Year	Date	Event
1714		Tibetan forces, aided by the Mongols, invade Bhutan but fail to gain control.
1730		Cooch Behar first requests Bhutanese assistance in repelling Mughal Empire encroachments, establishing a dependent relationship with Bhutan.
1770		Bhutan invades Sikkim, supported by troops from Cooch Behar.
1772		In a succession dispute in Cooch Behar, the Druk Desi's nominee for the throne was opposed by a rival who invited British troops; in effect, Cooch Behar became a dependency of the British East India Company.
1772		British expeditionary forces drive Bhutanese garrisons out of Cooch Behar, until that time a Bhutanese dependency. The Druk Desi petitions Lhasa unsuccessfully for assistance. (to 1773)
1774	25 April	The Druk Desi signs a Treaty of Peace with the British East India Company. Under the treaty, Bhutan returns to its pre-1730 boundaries and allows the British to harvest timber in Bhutan.
1784		British government turns over to Bhutan the Bengal Duars territory, where boundaries had been poorly defined. As in its other foreign territories, Bhutan left administration of the Bengal Duars territory to local officials and collected its revenues.

== 19th century ==
Year	Date	Event
1815		British mission to Thimphu fails to reach a conclusion amid increasing border tensions.
1838		British mission to Thimphu offers Bhutan a treaty providing for the extradition of Bhutanese officials responsible for incursions into Assam, free and unrestricted commerce between India and Bhutan, and settlement of Bhutan's debt to the British. In an attempt to protect its independence, Bhutan rejected the British offer.
1841		British annex Bhutanese controlled Assam Duars, paying a compensation of 10,000 rupees a year to Bhutan.
1842		Bhutan cedes control of the troublesome Bengal Duars to Britain.
1862		Bhutanese forces raid Sikkim and Cooch Behar; the British respond by withholding all compensation payments and demanding release of all captives and return of stolen property. These demands went unheeded by the Druk Desi, as he was alleged to be unaware of frontier officials' raids.
1864		Britain sends a peace mission to Bhutan in the wake of a recent civil war, during a period when two rival claimants to the office of Druk Desi competed for power. Though the British attempt to deal with both Druk Desis, the peace mission is rejected by Bhutan.
1864	November	Britain declares war on Bhutan. The Duar War lasts five months, resulting in Bhutan's defeat and cession of significant territory under the Treaty of Sinchula.
1865	11 November	Bhutan signs the Treaty of Sinchula, ceding territories in the Assam Duars and Bengal Duars, as well as the eighty-three-square-kilometer territory of Dewangiri in southeastern Bhutan, in return for an annual subsidy of 50,000 rupees.
1870		In the 1870s and 1880s, renewed competition among regional rivals – primarily the pro-British penlop of Trongsa and the anti-British, pro-Tibetan penlop of Paro – resulted in the ascendancy of Ugyen Wangchuck, the penlop of Trongsa. (to 1880)
1885		Ugyen Wangchuck, penlop (governor) of Trongsa, puts down civil unrest across Bhutan, consolidates power, and cultivates closer ties with British India.

== 20th century ==
Year	Date	Event
1903		The last reigning Shabdrung dies, and a successor is not found until 1906. In the meantime, the civil administration comes under the power of the Ugyen Wangchuck as Druk Desi.
1903		Ugyen Wangchuck volunteers to accompany a British mission to Lhasa as a mediator in the British expedition to Tibet and resulting Anglo-Tibetan Convention. In return, Ugyen is knighted and thereafter continues to accrue greater power in Bhutan. (to 1904)
1907	17 December	Ugyen Wangchuck is elected Bhutan's first hereditary ruler (Druk Gyalpo) after having politically unified the country.
1910	8 January	The Treaty of Punakha amends two articles of the 1865 Treaty of Sinchula: the British agree to double the annual stipend to 100,000 rupees and "to exercise no interference in the internal administration of Bhutan." In turn, Bhutan agrees "to be guided by the advice of the British Government in regard to its external relations."
1926	21 August	King Ugyen Wangchuck dies; his son Jigme Wangchuck begins to reign.
1927	16 March	Coronation of Jigme Wangchuck.
1931		The 7th Shabdrung Jigme Dorji dies at Talo monastery. Jigme Dorji is the last Shabdrung recognized by the government of Bhutan, though subsequent claimants to the incarnation continue today.
1947		The British Empire leaves India, and direct political by the British ends. Bhutan remains relatively isolated from international affairs.
1949	8 August	India and Bhutan sign the Treaty of Peace and Friendship, which provided that India would not interfere in Bhutan's internal affairs but that Bhutan would be guided by India in its foreign policy. The same year, India cedes to Bhutan some territories lost to the British in the 1865 Treaty of Sinchula.
1952	24 March	King Jigme Wangchuck dies; his son Jigme Dorji Wangchuck begins to reign. Bhutan begins a program of planned development and democratization. The same year, the National Assembly is established, and the post of Chief Minister (Gongzim) is abolished.
1957		Major glacial lake outburst flood from glacial lakes.
1958		Slavery is abolished.
1958		The first Nationality Act is enacted, defining Bhutanese citizenship and introducing a compulsory registration process.
1959		Bhutanese enclaves in western Tibet are seized by the Chinese.
1960		Major glacial lake outburst flood from glacial lakes.
1961		First Five-Year Plan is introduced.
1964	5 April	Prime Minister Jigme Palden Dorji is assassinated in a dispute among competing political factions. The King's own uncle, a military cadre, was among those executed for their role in the attempted coup. After a brief tenure by acting Prime Minister Lhendup Dorji, the post of Prime Minister is abolished until 1998.
1965		Unsuccessful attempt to assassinate King Jigme Dorji Wangchuck.
1966		The capital is moved from Punakha to Thimphu through a transition period when Punakha was the winter capital and Thimphu the summer capital.
1968		King Jigme Dorji Wangchuck establishes the first Council of Ministers, or executive cabinet. At the same time, the king renounces his power of veto, which had never been used. The king also creates the High Court (the Thimkhang Gongma) and empowers it to review the king's decisions. The Bank of Bhutan is also founded as a central bank, charged with supervising the transition from a barter economy to a monetary economy.
1968		Major glacial lake outburst flood from glacial lakes.
1969		Jigme Dorji Wangchuck called for a triennial vote of confidence by the National Assembly to renew the Druk Gyalpo's mandate to rule. This vote was later abolished by his successor.
1970		Bhutan's population reaches an estimated 300,000.
1971		Bhutan joins the United Nations.
1972	21 July	King Jigme Dorji Wangchuck dies; his son Jigme Singye Wangchuck begins to reign.
1974	March	Strains between the Wangchucks and Dorjis were relieved with the return that year of the exiled members of the latter family. The reconciliation, however, was preceded by reports of a plot to assassinate the new Druk Gyalpo before his coronation could take place and to set fire to the Tashichho Dzong, the seat of government in Thimphu. Yangki, the Druk Gyalpo's Tibetan mistress, was the alleged force behind the plot. Thirty persons were arrested, including high government and police officials. (to April)
1974	2 June	Coronation of Jigme Singye Wangchuck. The same year, the first foreign tourists are allowed to enter Bhutan.
1978		Bhutan's population reaches an estimated 400,000.
1982		The Royal Government establishes the Royal Monetary Authority, the central bank of Bhutan.
1985	10 June	The Bhutanese Citizenship Act 1985 is enacted.
1986		Bhutan's population reaches an estimated 500,000.
1986		One thousand illegal Lhotshampa laborers are expelled.
1987		Gasa District is split up among Punakha and Thimphu Districts; Chhukha District is carved out from parts of Samtse, Paro, and Thimphu Districts.
1988		Bhutan conducts its first census. As a result, many Lhotshampa (ethnic Nepalis) are branded as illegal immigrants.
1988		After a census, the government begins evicting those it identifies as illegal immigrants among the Nepali-speaking population in southern Bhutan. Over two decades, the population of Bhutanese refugees in refugee camps in neighboring Nepal climbed to 107,000 by 2008 according to UNHCR.
1989		The driglam namzha, the official behaviour and dress code, is elevated from recommended to mandatory in public and educational settings. Nepali ceases to be a language of instruction in schools, escalating tensions between Ngalops and Lhotshampas.
1989		Tek Nath Rizal, leader of the Bhutan Peoples' Party, is arrested and imprisoned.
1990		Violent ethnic unrest and anti-government protests in southern Bhutan pressing for greater democracy and respect for minority rights. The Bhutan Peoples' Party, whose members are mostly Lhotshampa, begin a campaign of violence against the government. Pro-government citizen militias form in response to rising crime and violence including clashes between Lhotshampa demonstrators and the Royal Bhutan Army. The Bhutan Peoples' Party is subsequently banned.
1991		Jigme Singye Wangchuck threatens to abdicate in face of hardline opposition in the National Assembly to his efforts to resolve ethnic unrest, leaving an international summit to attend to unrest.
1992		Tek Nath Rizal, leader of the illegal Bhutan Peoples' Party, is sentenced to life imprisonment.
1992		Gasa District is carved out from Punakha District; Tashi Yangtse District is split from Trashigang District. Other district boundaries are also changed
1992	2 November	The National Security Act is enacted. The Act defines treason and speech crimes, as well as unlawful assembly, rioting, and states of emergency, providing for lengthy prison sentences, capital punishment, and the use of deadly force by the government to stop unlawful demonstrations.
1994		Major glacial lake outburst flood from glacial lakes, devastating Punakha.
1998		The Council of Ministers (Lhengye Zhungtshog) replaces the cabinet, and King Jigme Singye Wangchuck withdraws from his role in the decision-making of the cabinet. The post of Prime Minister (Lonchen) is restored. (to 1999)
1999		Television is introduced.
1999	18 December	Tek Nath Rizal, leader of the illegal Bhutan Peoples' Party, is pardoned and released from prison along with some 40 other political prisoners. He goes into exile in Nepal, a common condition of release among Lhotshampa political dissidents.
2000		Bhutan and Nepal reach an agreement regarding the repatriation of certain classes of Bhutanese refugees living in camps in Nepal, subject to joint government verification. Points of contention included that some camp inhabitants were never citizens – or some even residents – of Bhutan before attaining refugee status. Also, the Bhutanese government regarded many political groups among the Nepalese Lhotshampa community, such as the Bhutan Peoples' Party (BPP) and Bhutan National Democratic Party (BNDP), as terrorist or anti-national groups.

== 21st century ==
Year	Date	Event
2001	March	First verification of Bhutanese refugees eligible for repatriation commences in Nepalese refugee camps. Actual repatriation is estimated to occur one year out. As of 2011 over 200 refugees in the Khudunabari refugee camp alone had been certified, however no Bhutanese refugees had been repatriated.
2002		Bhutan's population reaches an estimated 600,000.
2003		Several guerrilla groups seeking to establish an independent Assamese state in northeast India had set up guerrilla bases in the forests of southern Bhutan from which they launch cross-border attacks on targets in Assam. The largest guerrilla group was the United Liberation Front of Assam (ULFA). Negotiations aimed at removing them peacefully from these bases failed in the spring of 2003.
2003	15 December	The Royal Bhutan Army began military operations against guerrilla camps in southern Bhutan, in coordination with Indian armed forces who lined the border to the south to prevent the guerrillas from dispersing back into Assam. News sources indicated that of the 30 camps that were targeted, 13 were controlled by ULFA, 12 camps by the National Democratic Front of Bodoland (NDFB), and 5 camps controlled by the Kamatapur Liberation Organisation (KLO). By January 2004, government news reports indicated the guerrillas had been routed from their bases.
2004	20 March	Capital punishment in Bhutan is abolished.
2005	26 March	Proposed constitution is unveiled under which Bhutan would transition from absolute monarchy to a constitutional monarchy and parliamentary democracy.
2005	December	King Jigme Singye Wangchuck announces he will abdicate in 2008, when democratic parliamentary elections are held, and names Crown Prince Jigme Khesar Namgyel Wangchuck to succeed him.
2006	January	Authorities arrest two civil servants in the village of Nago in Paro District, accusing them of engaging in acts of proselytism under the false pretext of holding an official meeting, maligning the Spiritual Head of Bhutan (Je Khenpo), posing as officials on official business, and giving false information. In accordance with provisions in the Penal Code and the National Security Act, both men are found guilty in a district court. Christian groups maintain the men were arrested due to their religious beliefs since, according to these groups, the men were arrested while showing a Christian film in a Buddhist home. They are sentenced in early June 2006 in an open trial with a public hearing to three and a half years and three years in prison. They did not appeal the court judgment, although the right to appeal was provided for by law. On 28 July 2006, both men were released after payment of a fine.
2006	June	Bhutanese refugees in Nepalese refugee camps protest, pressing for third-country resettlement. (to August)
2006	14 December	Abdication of King Jigme Singye Wangchuck, ahead of the date previously announced; his son Jigme Khesar Namgyel Wangchuck begins to reign.
2007	5 January	The Royal Government enacts the Immigration Act of 2007, amending the Bhutanese Citizenship Act 1985 and establishing the Department of Immigration under the Ministry of Home and Cultural Affairs to implement and administer immigration laws through immigration offices. The Act endowed officers of the Department of Immigration with broad police and prosecution powers: they may enter any private or official premises in order to search, arrest, seize, detain, interrogate or to demand forfeiture of any vehicles, trains, vessels, aircraft, or goods.
2007	February	Bhutan signs an agreement with India giving the kingdom more say in its foreign and defense policies.
2007	3 February	Reports allege the current Zhabdrung Rinpoche, Pema Namgyel (b. 20 November 2003 – then a small child) had been held under house arrest in Bhutan along with his parents since October 2005, when the family traveled to meet the Reincarnation Committee. The Committee later denied his reincarnation status.
2007	April	Mock elections are staged to familiarise voters with parliamentary democracy ahead of planned polls in 2008.
2007	31 December	First National Council election for the 20 elected non-partisan seats in National Council, Bhutan's upper house. Only 15 out of 20 dzongkhags (districts), however, were set to begin voting. In Thimphu, Trashiyangtse, Gasa, Haa and Lhuntse Districts, there were either no candidates or a single candidate, and elections were delayed until 29 January 2008.
2008	January	A series of bombs blast the kingdom ahead of elections slated for 24 March. The attacks are blamed on armed Lhotshampa groups. (to February)
2008	24 March	In Bhutan's first parliamentary elections, the pro-monarchy Bhutan Peace and Prosperity Party wins 45 out of 47 seats in the National Assembly, Bhutan's lower house. Another pro-monarchy party, the People's Democratic Party, wins the remaining two seats in Gasa and Haa Districts.
2008	18 July	The Constitution of Bhutan is enacted. The first ever Constitution of Bhutan, it sets forth a bicameral parliamentary democratic framework to safeguard human rights, while enshrining the institution of the monarchy, Drukpa Lineage Buddhism, and traditional Ngalop Bhutanese culture.
2008	November	The government of India alleges links between Assamese separatists and the illegal Bhutanese Druk National Congress.
2008	1 November	Coronation of Jigme Khesar Namgyel Wangchuck.
2009	April	Huanglongbing virus decimates Bhutan's orange crop, an important export for the kingdom.
2009	11 September	Parliament enacts the Local Government Act of Bhutan 2009, the sixth legislative reform of Bhutanese local governments since 1999. The Act devolves various administrative powers to Dzongkhags (districts), Dungkhags (subdistricts), Gewogs (village blocks), Chiwogs (constituencies), and Thromdes (municipalities) while retaining legislative authority as the sole purview of the central government.
2009	21 September	The 6.1-magnitude 2009 Bhutan earthquake strikes Mongar District, causing at least 12 deaths, extensive destruction, and severe aftershocks in Bhutan.
2010	March	A district court interprets the constitutional clause regarding religious "coercion or inducement" to prohibit not only forced conversion but also proselytism in the case of a Christian missionary pastor who used a generator and a projector in a private home on 21 May 2009. The pastor received a sentence of three years imprisonment for infringing the Constitution.
2010	16 June	Parliament enacts the Tobacco Control Act, restricting import and possession, and banning the sale of tobacco in Bhutan.
2011	24 January	Sonam Tshering, a 23-year-old ordained monk from Langpa in Haa, was caught with 480 grams of chewing tobacco (purchased for Nu.120) en route from Phuntsholing to Thimphu. This presented the first prosecution under the Tobacco Control Act of Bhutan 2010 and was the result of a private individual informing the police that Tshering possessed tobacco. Although Tshering revealed the source of his tobacco to mitigate and qualify his offense as a misdemeanor, he failed to identify the location and supplier of the tobacco, apparently somewhere in the border town of Jaigaon. He was thus convicted of a felony, and sentenced to the minimum imprisonment of three years. The conviction and especially the sentence have made the Tobacco Control Act of Bhutan 2010 controversial in urban Bhutan due to their severity. Although the Constitution of Bhutan guarantees all persons the right to be represented by a jabmi (attorney), the Thimphu Dzongkhag Court closed the case before any jabmi could offer services. Tshering has since appealed the Dzongkhag Court ruling to the High Court of Bhutan, for which has retained a private attorney.
2011	23 January	Local government elections, originally slated for 2008, begin on a staggered scale in 3 of Bhutan's 20 Dzongkhags: Thimphu, Phuntsholing, and Samdrup Jongkhar.
2011	24 February	The Supreme Court of Bhutan declares unconstitutional the government's raising of personal vehicle import taxes in June 2010 without bicameral presentment and debate, affirming the judgment of the High Court Constitutional Bench against the Attorney General and for the Opposition in Parliament.
2011	28 June	The Election Commission announces the results of the first local government elections under the Constitution of Bhutan. Originally slated for 2008, elections faced multiple delays related to voter registration and constituency demarcation. Furthermore, voter turnout crept to 56% of eligible voters amid public sentiments of distrust and futility. In several instances, voters were unable to cast votes; in a few cases, legally unqualified candidates ran and won seats. Disqualified candidates, uncontested seats, and inconclusive results in some constituencies required the Election Commission to rerun elections at a later date.
2011	13 October	King Jigme Khesar Namgyel Wangchuck marries Jetsun Pema. Jetsun Pema, childhood friend of the Fifth King, becomes his Queen in a traditional Buddhist ceremony followed by three days of public holiday and celebrations. The much anticipated wedding, announced 20 May, was the largest media event in Bhutanese history.
2013	8 March	The Speaker of the National Assembly, Jigme Tshultim, sentenced to 2 years 6 months imprisonment for official misconduct, fraud, and deceptive practices; and the then Home Minister, Lyonpo Minjur Dorji, and 13 Plot Allotment committee members sentenced to a year imprisonment by the Mongar District Court for official misconduct in the Gyelpozhing land allotment case. On appeal, the convictions and sentences are upheld by the High Court of Bhutan on 16 May and by the Supreme Court on 17 July^{th.}
2013	13 April	National Council elections held
2013	31 May	Primary round of National Assembly elections held. Results: DCT—12,457 votes; DNT—35,962 votes; PDP-68,650 votes; DPT—93,949 votes.
2013	13 July	Final round of 2013 Bhutanese National Assembly election, held. Results: PDP-32 seats; DPT—15 seats. New Prime Minister: Tshering Tobgay.

== See also ==
- History of Bhutan
- List of rulers of Bhutan
