= Refugees in Nepal =

Nepal is home to 40,490 refugees officially recognized by the United Nations High Commissioner for Refugees (UNHCR). Indian, Tibetan and Bhutanese refugees account for a large majority of Nepal’s refugee population.

== Refugees from Bhutan ==
In the early 1990s, close to 106,000 Bhutanese refugees settled in seven U.N. supervised camps in eastern Nepal after being evicted from their homes in Bhutan when the government introduced a new law removing citizenship and civil rights due to ancestry. Without the right to work or own land in Nepal these refugees have been dependent on food aid from the United Nations.

After several failed discussions aimed at repatriating the refugees to Bhutan, most of the refugees have now been resettled to other international destinations with the help of the UNHCR and the International Organization for Migration. Since the start of its Bhutanese refugee resettlement initiative in 2007 the UNHCR has relocated over 100,000 refugees. The United States accommodated over 84,000 of these refugees, with the rest moving to Australia, Canada, Norway, New Zealand, Denmark, the United Kingdom and The Netherlands.

The five Bhutanese refugee camps in Nepal are:

1. Beldangi
2. Goldhap
3. Khudunabari
4. Sanischare
5. Timai

== Refugees from Tibet ==
In the years 1959, 1960, and 1961 following the 1959 Tibetan uprising and exile of the Dalai Lama, over 20,000 Tibetans migrated to Nepal. Since then many have emigrated to India or settled in refugee camps set up by the International Committee of the Red Cross, the Government of Nepal, the Swiss Government, Services for Technical Co-operation Switzerland, and Australian Refugees Committee.

Those who arrived before 1989 were issued refugee ID cards and benefited from de facto economic integration; however, more recent arrivals have no legal status and cannot own property, businesses, vehicles, or be employed lawfully. Many of these recent arrivals transit through Nepal on their way to India.

Currently there are twelve Tibetan Refugee camps in Nepal, each supervised by a representative appointed by the Central Tibetan Administration.

1. Choejor (Chorten & Jorpati)
2. Delekling, Chilsa, Solukhumbu
3. Norziling Tibetan Settlement Dorpattan, Baglung
4. Jampaling, Lodrik, Tanahu
5. Namgyeling, Tserok, Mustang
6. Paljorling, Lodrik, Pokhara
7. Phakshing & Gyalsa
8. Gyegayling, Rasuwa, Dunche
9. Samdupling, Jawalakhel
10. Tashi Palkhiel, Pokhara
11. Tashiling, Pokhara
12. Sampheling, Walung, Taplejung

Settlement office in Nepal 1) Gyalsaphak Tse Sum ( Ktm City, Sywambhu and Tserok) Lazimpath (Gaden Khangsar, Laimpath, Kathmandu 014423166/014419903) 2) Sha-Wa-Ra Sum (Solukhumbhu, Walung and Rasuwa) Lazimpath (Gaden Khangsar, Laimpath, Kathmandu 014419903) 3) Choejor (Chorten & Jorpati) Near Boudhnath Stupa 4) Samdupling, Jawalakhel 5) Jam-Pal- TeGang Lodrik settlement office, Pokhara +977 65570418 6) Tashiling, Dorpatan, Manang, Samdo Settlement office Chorepatan, Near Davis Fall Pokhara 7) Tashi Palkhiel, Pokhara

== Rohingya refugees from Myanmar ==
Rohingya refugees came to Nepal for asylum from Rakhine state of Myanmar in the 1990s and 2012. They came via eastern Nepal by crossing Bangladesh and India. They have been settled in Kapan at Kathmandu and various locations in Terai. The total number of Rohingya refugees in Nepal is estimated between 600 and 3000.

== Afghan refugees ==
Afghan refugees started arriving Nepal via India after American Occupation was replaced by Taliban administration in Afghanistan in 2021. They entered from Indian border. They are staying under supervision of UNHCR. It is expected that more Afghans will enter Nepal who are currently stationed in Delhi.

== Other Refugees ==
Although Nepal is home to some 800,000 stateless residents, the exact number of refugees is uncertain because Nepal is not a signatory of the 1951 U.N. Convention Relating to the Status of Refugees that ensures the legal status and economic rights of refugees. Nepal’s National Unit for the Coordination of Refugee Affairs has requested that the UNHCR not recognize additional cases of urban refugees within its borders in an effort to prevent Nepal from becoming a safe haven for illegal immigrants. Among the 600 refugees already recognized are mostly Pakistanis and few Somalis, many of whom belong to the Ahmadiya community that fled religious persecution in Pakistan, while the Somalis have been a victims of human trafficking.
