= Bhutanese diaspora =

Bhutanese people residing outside of Bhutan

Languages
- Dzongkha, Nepali, English

Religion
- Hinduism, Buddhism

The Bhutanese diaspora consists of people of Bhutanese origin who have migrated to various parts of the world, often due to economic, educational, and political reasons.

== History ==
The migration of Bhutanese people began in the late 20th century, primarily driven by the search for better economic opportunities and educational prospects.

In the 1990s, political and social unrest in Bhutan, particularly involving the Lhotshampa community, led to a significant outflow of refugees. Many of these refugees eventually resettled in countries like the United States, Canada, and Australia.

== Distribution ==
Australia is the most common destination of Bhutanese. According to the 2021 census, there are 12,002 Bhutanese Australians living in Australia.

In the United States, most of the Bhutanese are Lhotshampas, the Nepali speaking Hindu community of Bhutan. They came to US as refugees following the ethnic cleansing in their homeland Bhutan. There were 24,000 Bhutanese Americans in the U.S as per the 2017 census survey. But other sources estimates it to be around 90,000.

== See also ==
- British Bhutanese
