= Blooming Lotus English School =

School for Bhutanese refugees in Nepal

Coordinates: 26°36′47.9″N 88°2′27.7″E

Location
- Goldhap refugee camp Nepal

Information
- Established: August 1992; 32 years ago
- Language: English

The Blooming Lotus English School is a school for Bhutanese refugees at the Goldhap refugee camp in Nepal. The school was founded in August 1992, and educates its students in three different languages: English is the language of instruction, whereas Dzongkha is taught from grades 3 to 8 and Nepali is taught 40 minutes a day from pre-primary classes to grade 10.

The Blooming Lotus English School provides a curriculum including English (all grades); mathematics (optional and compulsory courses); science; history and civics (world history); accounts; social studies; values education; Dzongkha (grades 3 to 8); Nepali; education; economics; and health, population and environment.

In addition, the school instructs soccer, basketball, volleyball, karate, gymnastics, and marathon.

In 2010, Blooming Lotus hosted an art exhibition by the Institute of Fine Art and Commercial Art-Bhutan (IFACA), the themes of which included the experiences and conditions of Bhutanese refugees.

== See also ==
- Bhutanese refugees
- Goldhap refugee camp
- Refugees in Nepal
