= Bhutan–United Kingdom relations =

- Bhutan: United Kingdom

Diplomatic mission
- Royal Bhutanese Embassy, Brussels: High Commission of the United Kingdom, New Delhi

Bhutan–United Kingdom relations are the bilateral relations between the Kingdom of Bhutan and the United Kingdom of Great Britain and Northern Ireland.

Both countries do not have direct diplomatic relations, but share a membership in the United Nations, World Bank, Asian Development Bank, and Interpol.

== History ==
In 1772, the maharaja of Cooch Behar, a Bhutanese tributary state in North Bengal, died. The commander of the army of Cooch Behar, (Note: Also known as the Nazir Deo) Khagendra Narayan, installed a new king on the throne without consulting Bhutan, leading to war between the two states. Due to his status as a British subject (by inheriting former Mughal chaklas (Note: Administrative units of the Mughal period.) under rights of the British East India Company), Narayan appealed to the British to expel Bhutan from Cooch Behar. In exchange, Cooch Behar was annexed into the Province of Bengal. After Bhutan made an anti-British alliance with the Sannyasis and the Baikunthapur Estate, British forces invaded Bhutan in 1773. In March 1774, the Bengal Governor, Warren Hastings, received a letter from the 8th Dalai Lama asserting Bhutan's status as a Tibetan dependency (and thus a dependency of China). Relations between Bhutan and the UK were conducted under the context of a supposed tributary relationship between Bhutan and China, despite little relations between the two countries. Seeking to establish a commercial relationship with Tibet, a peace treaty between Britain and Bhutan was signed in April 1774, ending the first Anglo-Bhutanese War.

Border disputes between authorities in Cooch Behar and Bhutan continued, particularly over Maraghat from 1808-1818, ending in British concessions. Disputes also occurred over both countries harbouring each other's political refugees. However, the policy of appeasing Bhutanese demands largely ended with the 1821 Bijni dispute, renewed British confidence after victory in the Third Maratha War allowing a more forceful policy in north-east India. Following the First Anglo-Burmese War, and subsequent conquest of Assam in 1826, the British resumed the previous power sharing agreement of the Duars between Assam and Bhutan, wherein the Darrang Duars were shared, while the rest of the Assam Duars were Bhutanese. The British occupied Duars to use as leverage in disputes with Bhutan, and various cross-border raids over the Duars occurred from 1826–36, as well as disputes over extradition and land. Direct conflict with Bhutan was avoided out of fear of drawing in Tibet and China. Additionally, conflict with Afghanistan in the north-west frontier distracted the UK,. leading to a British mission to Bhutan in 1837 to negotiate a settlement over the Duars and extradition cases, ending in failure. However, the British discovered a lack of strong relations between Bhutan and China, encouraging a more forwards policy.

Further disputes over extradition of British subjects arrested in Bhutan, as well as continued border skirmishes, and issues with collecting tribute from Bhutan for their ownership of the Assam Duars, led to the UK annexing the region from Bhutan, in 1841. The Bhutanese government was annually compensated for the loss of the Duars, to prevent further raids into British territory. Bhutanese encroachments and land disputes continued in the Bengal Duars. In the late 1830s, refugees fleeing the civil war in Bhutan between Hargovind Kant and Durga Deva fled to Sikkim, a British protectorate, creating a dispute when British authorities refused to repatriate them. The rival factions in the civil war raised armies in British territory. Spillovers of internal conflicts of Bhutan led to British intervention on the side of Kant, with a settlement for the conflict drafted in 1842, though sporadic fighting erupted again from 1850, as Deva supporters exploited lenient British policy on prosecuting crimes of refugee offenders, to continue to raise armies in British territories to infiltrate Bhutan. Disputes on extradition continued throughout this period.

From 1842-50, British policy towards Bhutan was conciliatory, under the influence of Dr. Archibald Campbell, as well as authorities being too preoccupied with other conflicts in India to focus on the Bhutanese frontier. However, further border skirmishes over land disputes occurred in the 1850s, leading to a deterioration of relations. In 1860, British authorities temporarily occupied Falakata from Bhutan. These antagonistic relations created fears of an alliance between Bhutan and Sikkim, at war with Britain at the time. Thus, a peace mission led by Ashley Eden was launched in 1863, with the goal of replacing the 1774 Anglo-Bhutan treaty, with a new agreement to end the various disputes. The mission failed due to a lack of trust of the Bhutanese government in the UK, leading to Falakata and the rest of the Bengal Duars being permanently annexed. In the next months, Bhutan attempted to negotiate a peace settlement, but were repudiated by the British. The annexations went ahead, and preparations for an invasion of Bhutan were made, with the goal of forcing a new treaty. In November 1864, the Duar War began.

The Duar War ended in a British victory, with the Treaty of Sinchula forced onto Bhutan. The treaty gave full extradition rights to Britain, and settled border disputes in favour of the British, though with an annual allowance given to the Bhutanese government. Britain and Bhutan would reconcile following the conflict, as renewed interest in Central Asia placed new importance on Bhutanese trade. A Bhutanese agent to the British was stationed at Buxa for better communications. The UK adopted a non-interventionist policy towards Bhutan, though forbidding the recruitment of soldiers from British and Nepalese territory.

In 1910, the pro-British Dragon King, Ugyen Wangchuck, agreed to the Treaty of Punakha with the UK. This came in response to the Chinese expedition to Tibet, seen as a threat to Bhutan. The treaty replaced Sinchula, and allowed for British guidance of the foreign policy of Bhutan. Relations between Bhutan and the UK were conducted through the British political officer in Sikkim.

Following the end of the British Raj, India assumed the British role of providing guidance to Bhutanese foreign policy, as stipulated in the 1949 Bhutan-India Treaty of Friendship. Since Indian independence, there have been no formal diplomatic relations between Bhutan and the UK.

Since 2007, a small Bhutanese diaspora has developed in the UK, predominantly Lhotsampa refugees.

== Economic relations ==
Economic relations began with the 1774 Anglo-Bhutanese Treaty allowing the East India Company to extract timber from the foothills of Bhutan duty-free. The British had early interest in Bhutan as a trade route to Tibet and western China, especially due to high taxes on alternative routes through Nepal. The 1774-75 George Bogle Mission successfully negotiated trade between British Bengal and Bhutan, though with restrictions on European merchants, and a Bhutanese monopoly established over certain goods. (Note: Sandal, indigo, otter skins, tobacco, betal-nut, and pan) Further trade missions were sent from 1775 to 1784, with little success, though a fair for Bhutanese traders was established by the British administration in Rangpur.

Despite efforts from some in the East India Company to promote commercial relations, trade with Bhutan declined throughout the mid-1800s due to internal conflict in Bhutan, though following the British intervention of 1842, trade relations improved.

In 2024, British exports to Bhutan were valued at £7 million, predominantly whiskies. In the same year, Bhutanese exports to the UK were worth $159,000.

== Diplomatic missions ==
- Bhutan is accredited to the United Kingdom through the Royal Bhutanese Embassy in Brussels, represented by ambassador to Belgium Tshoki Choden.
- The United Kingdom is accredited to Bhutan through the British High Commission in New Delhi, represented by High Commissioner to India Lindy Cameron. The closest British consular office to Bhutan is the Deputy High Commission in Kolkata. The UK is also represented by an honorary consul, Andrew Sutton.

== See also ==
- Foreign relations of Bhutan
- Foreign relations of the United Kingdom
