= Bhutanese refugees scam =

Refugees scam in Nepal

The Bhutanese refugees scam was a fraud scheme that duped over 800 Nepalis out of millions of rupees by giving them fictitious documents in the name of asylum seekers from Bhutan who were qualified for resettlement in other countries. A political-bureaucratic network and intermediaries were involved in this complex plan. The scandal made the pervasive corruption in Nepal's political and administrative structures public, leading to the arrest of 30 individuals including former deputy prime minister Top Bahadur Rayamajhi, former home minister Bal Krishna Khand and former home secretary Tek Narayan Pandey. The Kathmandu District Court announced its final verdict on 14 July 2026, where 16 individuals were found guilty and sentenced to imprisonment, 8 individuals still remaining to be prosecuted and 7 individuals acquitted due to lack of evidence.

== Background ==
Bhutan, a small landlocked nation in South Asia, has perpetrated ethnic cleansing of the Lhotshampa. It is alleged that the government's efforts to preserve Bhutanese culture led to the forcible eviction of thousands of Lhotshampas, or individuals of Nepali heritage, from Bhutan in the late 1980s and early 1990s. These people applied for asylum in nearby nations, particularly Nepal, which took in the most Bhutanese refugees.

== Departure of Lhotshampas from Bhutan (late 1980s to early 1990s) ==
Ethnic Nepalis, known as Lhotshampas ("southerners"), had lived in the southern districts of Bhutan for generations. However, citing concerns about illegal immigration and seeking to promote a unified national identity under the "One Nation, One People" policy, the Bhutanese government implemented stricter measures in the late 1980s. Key among these were the 1985 Citizenship Act, which retroactively required proof of residence prior to 1958, and a stringent census operation starting in 1988 primarily targeting southern Bhutan.

== Verification and failed repatriation efforts (1993–2000s) ==
Addressing the refugee situation became a major bilateral issue between Nepal and Bhutan. A Joint Ministerial Level Committee (JMLC) was formed in 1993. By 1993, the two governments had agreed to categorize the camp population into four groups: (1) Bonafide Bhutanese evicted forcefully, (2) Bhutanese who emigrated (including those who signed VMFs, often alleged under duress), (3) Non-Bhutanese people, and (4) Bhutanese who committed criminal acts.

A Joint Verification Team (JVT) was eventually formed in late 2001 to begin field verification, starting with the Khudunabari camp. The process required refugees to provide extensive documentation, often difficult for those who fled hastily or whose papers were confiscated. The verification process was extremely slow (averaging only a few families per day) and fraught with disagreements over methodology and documentation, leading to widespread frustration among refugees and observers who suspected delaying tactics by Bhutan. Ultimately, the verification process stalled, and large-scale repatriation never occurred.

== Third-country resettlement (2007–2016) ==
With repatriation prospects dimming, a major international effort began in 2007 to resettle the Bhutanese refugees from the Nepali camps to third countries. Led by the United States, and involving Canada, Australia, New Zealand, Denmark, Norway, the Netherlands, and the UK, this program became one of the world's most successful large-scale resettlements. Between 2007 and 2016, over 113,500 Bhutanese refugees were resettled from Nepal.

== Post-resettlement context ==
By the end of the group resettlement program, the refugee camps were consolidated, and the remaining population significantly reduced. As of November 2020, UNHCR reported around 6,300 Bhutanese refugees remained in Nepal, with the focus shifting towards local integration and self-reliance rather than further large-scale resettlement. It was in this context, where genuine large-scale resettlement opportunities had ceased, that the scam emerged, fraudulently promising this outcome to Nepali citizens.

== The scam unveiled ==
This fraud came to the limelight when more than 160 victims, frustrated by their long wait, and loss of hard-earned money, registered a complaint at the Commission for the Investigation of Abuse of Authority (CIAA). These victims, who were Nepali citizens, paid sums ranging from Rs 1 million to Rs 5 million, based on promises from fraudulent credential-wielding individuals identifying them as Bhutanese refugees eligible for resettlement, especially to the United States. Strangely, they had no idea of the manipulation done by the scammers to project them as Bhutanese asylum seekers. According to information uncovered during investigations by law enforcement organizations, Pandey got millions of rupees in bribes for his involvement in the crime. An important milestone in the continuing probe is Pandey's arrest.

== Implications and fallout ==
The widespread corruption in Nepal's political and administrative structures has come to light as a result of the scam involving Bhutanese refugees. Experts have emphasized the presence of a link between intermediaries, bureaucrats, and politicians that feeds the country's systemic corruption. Nationwide outrage followed the revelation that prominent political party officials had promised Nepali individuals false identities as Bhutanese refugees in exchange for millions of dollars. The scope of the swindle was revealed by a report written by the task group under Panthi's direction. The UNHCR (United Nations High Commissioner for Refugees) has officially recognized 429 people as Bhutanese refugees, according to the report.

== Involvement and arrests ==
The first arrests were made on March 26, 2023, when police arrested middlemen Keshav Dulal, Sanu Bhandari, and Tanka Gurung. On May 2-4, police arrested Indrajit Rai, security adviser to then-home minister Ram Bahadur Thapa, former home secretary Tek Narayan Pandey and Sandeep Rayamajhi (son of Top Bahadur Rayamajhi) after earlier arrests revealed their involvement. On May 10, former Home Minister and Nepali Congress politician Bal Krishna Khand was detained at his home in Nepal for his complicity in the trafficking of Nepali individuals as Bhutanese refugees overseas. On May 14, Top Bahadur Rayamajhi, former secretary of the Communist Party of Nepal (Unified Marxist–Leninist) and former Energy Minister, was arrested after being on the run for more than 10 days. Other arrestees were Niraj Rai (son of Indrajit Rai), Ang Tawa Sherpa, Tek Nath Rijal, Ram Sharan KC, Sandesh Sharma Pokhrel, and Sagar Thulung. At the time of the investigation, police were also looking for evidence linked to Arzu Rana Deuba, a member of parliament, and Manju Khand, the wife of the detained former Home Minister Khand, since they are accused of knowing about or being involved in the alleged trafficking plan. In November 2025, the investigation was reopened and intensified resulting in the arrest of middleman Niranjan Kumar Kharel and broker Bechan Jha.

The investigation and arrests were made under the leadership of then-AIG Manoj KC.

== Verdict and sentencing ==
In early July 2026, the Kathmandu District Court, in a judgment delivered by Judge Tej Bahadur Khadka, convicted 16 defendants in the original and supplementary proceedings and acquitted seven others. The convictions covered various combinations of fraud, organised crime, forgery of government documents, offences against the state and complicity in those offences.

Keshav Prasad Dulal, Sanu Bhandari, Sagar Rai, Ang Tawa Sherpa, Sandesh Sharma, Govinda Kumar Chaudhary, Top Bahadur Rayamajhi, former home secretary Tek Narayan Pandey and former security adviser Indrajit Rai were convicted of combinations of fraud, organised crime and offences against the state. Dulal and Bhandari were additionally convicted of forging government documents. Former home minister Bal Krishna Khand was convicted as an accomplice to fraud, organised crime and offences against the state. Bhutanese refugee leader Tek Nath Rijal, Narendra K.C., Shamsher Miya, Hari Bhakta Maharjan and Niranjan Kumar Kharel were convicted of assisting parts of the organised fraud; Rijal was also convicted in connection with the forgery of government documents. Bechan Jha, who had been prosecuted through a supplementary charge sheet, was convicted of attempted fraud.

The court acquitted Ram Sharan K.C., Sandeep Rayamajhi, Pratik Thapa, Tanka Kumar Gurung, Laxmi Maharjan, Keshav Tuladhar and Ashish Budhathoki, finding that the prosecution had not produced sufficient evidence to establish their involvement. Proceedings involving eight defendants who had not appeared before the court remained pending until their arrest or appearance.

On 14 July 2026, the court announced the prison terms and fines for the convicted defendants. Rayamajhi and Pandey were each given an integrated sentence of four years' imprisonment and a fine of Rs 40,000. Dulal and Bhandari were also each sentenced to an effective four years in prison and fined Rs 40,000. Their offence-specific penalties included sentences for forgery, fraud, organised crime and offences against the state, but the court applied an integrated sentence rather than adding all the prison terms consecutively.

Khand and Rijal were each sentenced to two years' imprisonment and fined Rs 20,000. Shamsher Miya, Narendra K.C., Hari Bhakta Maharjan, Niranjan Kumar Kharel and Bechan Jha were each sentenced to one year in prison and fined Rs 10,000. The court also imposed offence-specific sentences on Sagar Rai, Ang Tawa Sherpa, Sandesh Sharma and Govinda Kumar Chaudhary according to the charges on which each had been convicted.

Indrajit Rai received an integrated sentence of four years' imprisonment and a fine of Rs 40,000. The court, however, applied a statutory reduction because he was over 75 years old. After taking into account the time he had already spent in pre-trial detention, the court determined that he had two months and thirteen days of the reduced sentence remaining to serve.

Although the judgment specified separate penalties for individual offences, a sentence-enforcement official at the Kathmandu District Court explained that, where several offences arose from the same criminal occurrence, the longest custodial term would ordinarily be enforced while the other prison terms would run concurrently. Fines, restitution and other financial liabilities would be aggregated. The official stated that the precise method of enforcement would ultimately depend on the full written judgment.

The ruling was a first-instance judgment and remained subject to appeal. Both the prosecution and the convicted defendants could challenge it before the Patan High Court. Defendants still in custody could appeal while remaining detained, whereas those previously released could seek to remain outside custody during the appeal by depositing the amounts required under Nepali law.

== See also ==
- Nepal visit visa extortion scandal
