= Nepalese immigration in Bhutan =

Nepali immigrants living in Bhutan

There are no authentic account of the immigration of Nepalese to Bhutan. The data are based on British account and oral evidences. It is believed that settlement of Nepalese in Bhutan took place after Anglo-Bhutan war in 1865 via Sikkim.

The settlement were mainly confined in three southern regions of Bhutan.

== Samchi settlement ==
It is the western settlement in the area of Sibsu, Chamurchi and Drokha area. Nepalese came to settle in this area mainly to quarry limestone. Dalchand Gurung had made a contract with Paro Penlop of the area for mining, which included all area of Samchi district except Sibsu. Sibsu was controlled by the Bhutanese king himself. Per arrangement, Gurung recruited settlers from eastern Nepal with authority from Nepal government. Gurung had to pay royalty tax to Penlop once a year. The king of Bhutan had no control of the area, and Gurung's family was the de facto ruler of the region until the death of last Paro Penlop in 1946.

In 1891, the king of Bhutan offered Laxmi Das Pradhan, the leading figure of Nepalese community from Darjeeling to administer the Sibsu area at an annual cash payment of NPR 20,000. Sibsu area was eventually administered by the descendents of Gurung's family and integrated in Samchi area.

The Gurungs were eventually dismissed by the king, and they were awarded a pension of NPR 4000 for their lifetime.

== Tsirang settlement ==
The eastern settlement was done in the Tsirang District. The settlement was initiated by Kaji Ugyen Dorji, the grandfather of Jigme Dorji Wangchuck in the 1900s to cultivate the area. The process continued for three decades by with 35,000 Nepalese were living in the area. In 1945, the immigration was stopped and by 1958, the settlement was about 75,000.

The Tsirang was administered by Dorji by paying annual tax to the Bhutanese king. Dorje collected taxes from the Nepalese settler. By 1958, the tax surmounted to about NPR 500,000 which was a significant portion of Bhutans's state revenue.

== Central settlement ==
The internal migration led to settlement in the central area of Bhutan. By 1958, the Nepalese population in Tala and Dagana reached about 60,000.

== Aftermath ==
=== Nepali congress and India Gorkha League ===
During late 1940s, Nepali Congress and Akhil Bharatiya Gorkha League collaborated to bring propagate the idea of democracy in Bhutan after successful overthrow of Rana regime in Nepal. Members of Akhil Bharatiya Gorkha League started collecting money from Nepalese settlers in Bhutan to fight against Bhutan government. Sensing the situation, the king of Bhutan banned the activities and abandoned the league members (including Bhutanese members) to live in Assam. The league asked Nepal government to look at the situation of Nepalese in Bhutan. The government of Nepal took a political pressure in Bhutan and was successful to return some abandoned members of the League to return to Bhutan.

=== Formation of Bhutan state congress ===
Bhutan state congress was formed in 1952 in Assam to protect the interests of Nepalese in Bhutan. The congress elected Dalmardhan Raj Chetri as president and Dhan Bahadur Gurung as vice president. The congress could make some representation in Nepal government and Indian Government, but was largely not a success. In 1954, about 100 members staged Satyagraha from Patgaon to Sarbhang. The Bhutanese police killed three demonstrators and injured several. Following the incident, Girija Prasad Koirala went to Patgaon to support the demonstrator. Indian government banned the demonstration against Bhutan and the demonstration could not ripe off.

=== Nationality act ===
In 1958, the Nationality Act was passed by National Assembly of Bhutan to grant Bhutanese Nationality to all Nepalese who had settled before 1958. They were titled Lhotshampas meaning southern Bhutanese. By 1985, three types of citizenship were provided based on birth, registration or by naturalization.

The government of Bhutan viewed Nepalese settlers as enterprising, diligent and competent agriculturist and thus the aboriginal Bhutanese could not compete with them. The Bhutaese king also thought they were culturally incompatible. Based on these feelings, the government of Bhutan launched Royal Government's policy on census, immigration and cadastral survey. This was aimed to identify genuine Bhutanese citizen. It did not go well with the Nepalese settlers. In the meantime, a violet demonstration occurred in West Bengal, India by Gorkha Liberation Front, that made the Bhutanese king insecure about the presence of Nepalese in southern Bhutan. The Bhutanese government adopted Green Belt Policy that aimed to destroy the southern fertile land, mainly to force the people out. This policy forced 100,000 Bhutanese citizen to take refute in Nepal and some in India.

== See also ==
- Bhutanese refugees in Nepal
