= Free Press Foundation =

Mongolian Printing Company

- Abbreviation: FPF
- Formation: 16 February 1996
- Type: non-governmental organization
- Headquarters: Ulaanbaatar
- Region served: Mongolia
- Key people: Kh.Naranjargal, N.Bolormaa
- Staff: 25
- Website: www.freepress.mn

Free Press Foundation (FPF, Mongolian: "Чөлөөт хэвлэл сан" сонины хэвлэх үйлдвэр) is one of the largest printing houses in Mongolia. It was first established in 1996 under the name Newspaper Printing House with a grant aid from the Danish International Development Assistance Agency within the framework of the project "Free and Independent Press in Mongolia" implemented in accordance with the agreement between the Government of Mongolia and the Government of Denmark. The Government of Denmark commemorated the Free Press Foundation to the transition to free democratic society system and free open economic market in Mongolia. Between 1996 and 2005, the Free Press Foundation printed up to 90% of total number of newspaper titles in Mongolia. Presently, it prints over 60% of total number of newspaper titles and over 70% of total circulation of nationally printed newspapers.

== History ==
During a UNDP donor countries' conference held in Ulaanbaatar in October 1991, Denmark expressed interest in supporting the democratization process in Mongolia. Thus, Mongolia was included into "Support Programme for countries in transition", financed by the Government of Denmark. DANIDA, the Danish International Development Agency, implemented projects in agriculture, energy, environment protection, education, press and humanitarian sectors of Mongolia. "Free and Independent press of Mongolia" was one of the projects supported by the Government of Denmark. It is one of the longest and most successfully implemented projects in Mongolia by DANIDA. The Government of Denmark provided 3 million 725 thousand Danish krone for the construction of an independent printing house in Mongolia. The Government of Mongolia invested financing equivalent to 925 thousand DKK.

== Status ==
FPF is a non-government, non-profit and non-membership organization, designed to promote social development. The status of non-profit organization was a logical continuation of the project and its objective. The project implementers have voiced their common opinion that the non-profit status is the best and open model and is the solution for being independent from financial and political interests. That's why, it needed to register the foundation as a non-government organization to maintain the status of non-profit entity. The best or optimal option was to establish a foundation. According to the Mongolian Law on NGOs, foundations are allowed to conduct economic activities and gain profits from them. Profit is gained from economic activities. However, it doesn't distribute the profit as a dividend to anybody. It re-invests in the foundation operations and gives it away as grant aids and donations. There are many foundations in Denmark and Europe with NGO status. The decision to establish an NGO has proven to be consistent through the years, and to this day FPF have been operating as an NGO adhering to its main line of foundation purpose and objectives.

== Governing body ==
The supreme governing body of the FPF is the Managing Board. The Board shall consist of seven members including chairperson, three representatives of the Customers' Assembly, and three representatives of Employees' Assembly. Each Assembly shall elect these three persons to the Board. The Chairperson of the Board shall be an independent person, widely respected in the society and without any particular interest in the Foundation's activities and newspaper publishing. Candidates to be the Chairperson are to be nominated by members of the Board. The candidate who has won absolute majority of votes is elected. The Chairperson shall be elected for a three-year period by secret voting of six members of the Board.

=== Members ===
Head of the Managing Board:

- Kh. Naranjargal. Head of "Globe International" NGO

Members:

- Yo.Unurbayar, Member of the Mongolia Law Association, member of the Mongolian Advocates Association
- S.Sharavdorj. Vice-president of Union of the Mongolian Journalists, Head of the Rural Press and Information Network MARY Center
- Sh.Altankhuyag. Management advisor
- D.Odmaa. Member of the Managing Board of the Mongolian Marketing Association
- B.Galsansukh. Poet
- Ts.Munkhjin. Vice Editor-in-Chief of the "Zasgiin gazryn medee" newspaper

== Equipment and technology ==
The main equipment and technology was installed in 1996. Supported by effective investment policy, equipment modernization was performed in due time and manner by introducing advanced and world-leading technologies from Denmark, Sweden, Germany, UK, and Japan. It prints all kinds of paper products.

== Capacity ==
FPF prints over 60% of the total number of national newspapers and encompasses over 70% of press sales market share of Mongolia. It also prints 50% of all daily newspapers in Mongolia and newspapers for all 21 provinces of Mongolia. Annual sales income: 2-2.5 billion MNT.
