= Goldhap refugee camp =

Refugee camp in Nepal

Coordinates: 26°36′47.9″N 88°2′27.7″E

Goldhap refugee camp (Nepali: गोलधाप शरणार्थी शिविर; Goldhāp śaraṇārthī śivira) is a small refugee camp in Nepal populated by just over 4,600 Bhutanese refugees as of 2011. Because of its dwindling population, the UNHCR merged Goldhap into the nearby Beldangi refugee camps. The camp is located near the settlement of Goldhap, along the Thulo Bato Road, directly abutting the Charali Jungle in Jhapa.

== Inhabitants ==
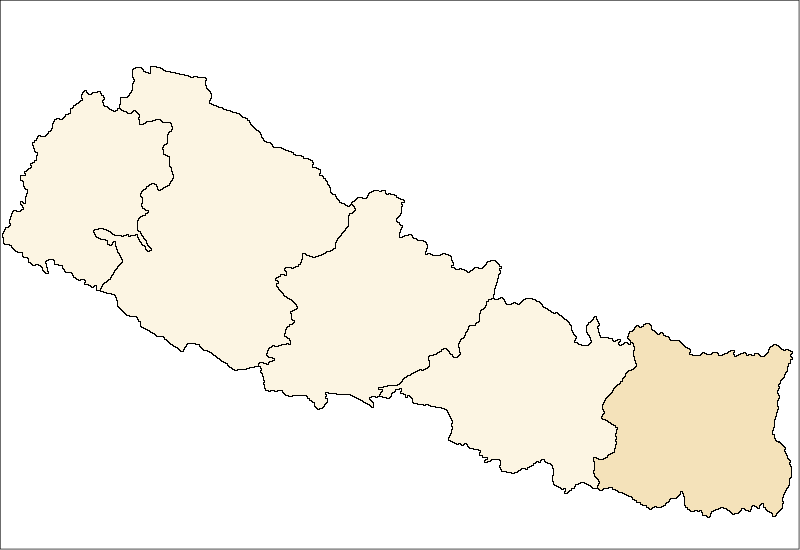
Bhutanese refugee camps in Eastern Nepal; Goldhap in green.

Goldhap is the smallest of the seven Bhutanese refugee camps in Nepal. Its 2002 population was about 9,000, which fell by 2011 to just over 4,600 thanks to third-country resettlement.

After settling in the different camps, politically interested people formed many political organizations. Most of the people in the camps are Hindus, and the rest are Buddhists with some Christians. Initially, Hinduism and Buddhism were the only religions in the camp, before some people joined others.

== Schools in Goldhap ==
Blooming Lotus English School accepts grade 6 to 10 (usually 7-10), focusing on college preparation. Some students return to teach or go on to hold important positions. In the Pathsala of the Goldhap Camp religious books are also taught, include Geeta and Vishnu sahasranama.

The Institute of Fine Art and Commercial Art (IFACA-BHUTAN) teaches fine arts and focuses on helping young refugee children to express their feeling and restart their new life. The program began under the trees with limited materials but moved to a Caritas-built school, Blooming Lotus English School (BLES). This institute has been working for years to raise awareness of the Bhutanese Refugee issues regarding health, environmental sanitation, education, human rights, women's rights, children's rights, firefighting, and bird flu. They work in co-ordination with different UN agencies, Nepali government, local organizations and peoples in refugees camp by making posters, banners, pamphlets, boards and awareness exhibitions.

In addition to advocacy, this institute has produced hundreds of Bhutanese artists from the Jhapa and Morang refugee camps in Nepal. Govinda Dhungana, who received primary education at Blooming Lotus English school, is the first screen actor from Bhutan.

== Physical Features ==
The camp is surrounded by rivers on three sides and a small stream on the fourth side. To the east, there is a big forest. To the west, north and south there is another forest and villages. The names of the river are Deuney and Baitarney. The city of Birtamode is located a few miles away from the camp, and the Chandragadhi Airport is located a few kilometers away.

== Fire of 2011 ==
On March 23, 2011, large fire burned through most of Goldhap refugee camp including residential areas and the camp health center, leaving some 3,790 refugees homeless. The same day, a separate fire scorched Sanischare, another nearby Bhutanese refugee camp, claiming 1,200 homes.

Previously, there was a big fire on March 1, 2008, which destroyed about 1000 huts.

== See also ==
- Bhutanese refugees
- Immigration in Bhutan
- Refugees in Nepal
