= Ethnic cleansing of Lhotshampa in Bhutan =

Expulsion and ethnic cleansing of Nepalis in Bhutan

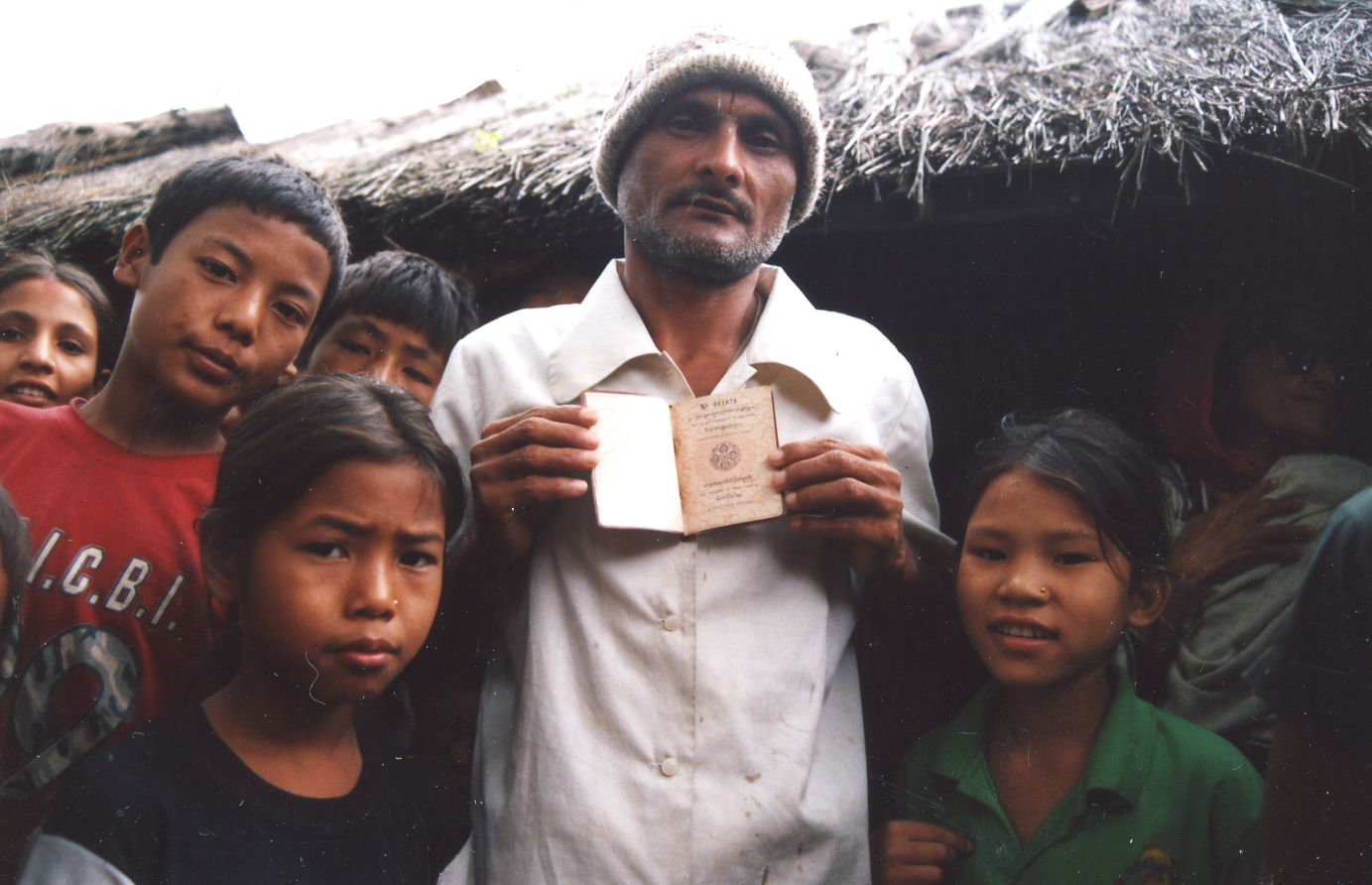
- An image of Bhutanese refugees, one of whom is holding his Bhutanese passport.
- Location: Bhutan
- Date: 1980s–present
- Attack type: Ethnic cleansing
- Victim: Lhotshampa
- Motive: Anti-Nepali sentiment, Anti-immigration

Ethnic cleansing of Lhotshampa in Bhutan refers to acts of violence to remove the Lhotshampa, or ethnic Nepalis, from Bhutan. Inter-ethnic tensions in Bhutan have resulted in the flight of many Lhotshampa to Nepal. By 1996, over 100,000 Bhutanese refugees (40% of Bhutan's Lhotshampa population at the time) were living in refugee camps in Nepal. The exact figure has been disputed. The Bhutanese authorities also claim that the number of refugees has been rising since 1991, when there were only 300. UNHRC camps in eastern Nepal received about 6,000 refugees from Bhutan at the height of the conflict, but the number shot up in the following years, reaching over 100,000 by the end of 1993.

== Background: Lhotshampa people ==
The Lhotshampa or Lhotsampa (Nepali: ल्होत्साम्पा; Tibetan: ལྷོ་མཚམས་པ་, Wylie: lho-mtshams-pa) population is a heterogeneous Bhutanese people of Nepalese descent. Mostly Hindu people of Nepalese origin began to settle in uninhabited areas in southern Bhutan in the 19th century. Ethnic Nepalese communities had been living in southern Bhutan since at least the 19th century, having migrated as laborers By the late 20th century, they made up a significant portion of Bhutan's population. The Bhutanese monarchy and ruling elite viewed their growing numbers and cultural distinctiveness as a potential threat to national unity. In the 1980s, Bhutan introduced strict citizenship laws, including the 1985 Citizenship Act, which required documentation proving residence before 1958—something many Lhotshampa lacked. The Lhotshampa people are native to southern Bhutan and are therefore commonly referred to as 'Southerners'. As of 2007, much of the Lhotshampa population has been relocated to Western countries, such as the United States, Canada, Australia, the United Kingdom, and other European countries after facing expulsion policies from the Bhutanese government. Today, the number of Lhotshampa in Nepal is significantly less than in the United States and other countries where they have relocated. No refugees have been allowed to return to Bhutan despite negotiations taking place.

== History ==
There have been mentions of settlers of Nepali origin as early as the 8th century. The population in the southern lowlands grew with the arrival of migrant laborers from Nepal around the turn of the twentieth century. Nepal, had a fast-growing population. Bhutan had a low population density, plenty of fertile land, and better social services with free education and medical services which attracted illegal immigrants. The immigrants of Nepali origin, who had already settled in Bhutan by 1958 were given full citizenship and were referred to by the local term "Lhotshampa", which meant southerner, which was used as a politically correct designated term for the legal settlers. The government of Bhutan made efforts to integrate Lhotshampas into the Bhutanese Community and to bring the communities closer together. Cash incentives for cross-cultural marriages (Nu.5000 was provided which was later increased to Nu.10,000) were provided to integrate immigrants into mainstream culture, along with the government's active integration program of both cultures. One example of a cross-cultural marriage is Ashi Pema Lhadon Wangchuck, the sister of the Fourth Druk Gyalpo of Bhutan, marriage to Dasho Andee Barun Gurung who was of Nepali descent. Along with that, they were admitted as civil servants and given representation in the National Assembly. Some of them went on to represent the Bhutanese Government overseas. Lhotsampa students were educated alongside Drukpa Schoolchildren and provided scholarships to study abroad in countries like the UK and Japan, the economic activities and infrastructure investment were mainly concentrated in the south. Special loans were provided and land was allotted to the Nepalese. Many young people of Nepali origin joined the civil service. The former King of Bhutan, the Fourth Druk Gyalpo Jigme Singye Wangchuck on his travels to the south addressed in 1974 said, "the citizens of Southern Bhutan must never regard yourselves as aliens, because not only you but your forebears also were born and raised in Bhutan and such, all of you are Bhutanese."

The cut-off point of the 1958 Citizenship Act acted as the basis for classifying illegal immigrants and Lhotshampas.

== Expulsion and migration ==
The Lhotshampa community began migrating to southern Bhutan in the mid-19th century. Between 1988 and 1993, a significant number of Lhotshampa left Bhutan amid growing ethnic tensions and political unrest. In 1990, protests advocating for greater democratic rights and minority recognition emerged in southern Bhutan. In response, the Bhutanese government emphasized the presence of existing representative institutions such as the National Assembly and the National Advisory Council. Local governance structures were also established to increase citizen participation in development planning. These included, the Dzongkhag Yargay Tshogdue (DYT), established in 1981 to empower grassroots decision-making by enabling district residents to formulate, approve, and implement local development plans. Similarly, the Gewog Yargay Tshogchung (GYT), established in 1991, aimed to enhance local development by enabling communities to participate in decision-making, implement need-based projects, and contribute to sustainable local governance.

Amid the unrest, the Bhutan Peoples' Party, whose members were predominantly Lhotshampa, initiated anti-government activities. During this period, there were reports of damage to public property, with investigations estimating losses exceeding $80,000 at schools, health units, and other facilities. The government's security response during this time drew international attention and concern. Allegations emerged of human rights violations, including the detention of political activists, educators, and other civilians. These developments prompted thousands of Lhotshampa to leave the country, many of whom sought refuge in Nepal and India.

=== Citizenship legislation ===
The Bhutan Citizenship Act of 1985 introduced new eligibility criteria for citizenship, which affected many individuals of Nepali origin, including those from the Lhotshampa community. The Act stipulated that to qualify for citizenship, both parents must be Bhutanese, a provision that had significant implications for the Lhotshampa community. The Act also provided that individuals who were permanently domiciled in Bhutan on or before 31 December 1958, and whose names were recorded in the census register maintained by the Ministry of Home Affairs, would be recognized as Bhutanese citizens by registration.

The Lhotshampas who were found to have settled in Bhutan before 1958 qualified and continued to live in Bhutan legally making up thirty five percent of the total population currently with lhotshampa individuals achieving the ministerial and administrative positions with each changing governments as of 2025. As of January 2010, 85,544 refugees remained in camps. In 2008, the US State Department estimated that as much as 35% of the population of Bhutan had been displaced as a result of these conflicts. Prior to expulsion, the Lhotshampa had held major roles within the Bhutanese government, which included serving as bureaucrats, police officers, and in the army.

Although many Lhotshampa fled to India, they were met with very little support from the local Indian government, which allowed the army to commit acts of violence against them. Nepal proved to be more receptive to the population and eventually engaged in discussions with Bhutan to try and repatriate the Lhotshampa starting in April 1993. During these discussions, Bhutan proposed a categorization system to determine the eligibility of refugees for repatriation. They were broken into four categories, consisting of Bhutanese who had been evicted, Bhutanese who had emigrated, Bhutanese with criminal records, and non-Bhutanese people. Under this categorization, about 2.5 percent of the refugees were placed in category I and therefore eligible for repatriation to Bhutan. An additional 70 percent, under Category II, would be required to reapply for Bhutanese citizenship. This prevented the Lhotshampa from re-entering the country by removing their citizenship rights; this included pressuring Lhotshampa to sign forms stating that they had voluntarily left Bhutan.

== 21st century ==
=== Resettlement outside Bhutan ===
Several countries—including the United States, Canada, Australia, New Zealand, Norway, the Netherlands, and Finland—have participated in third-country resettlement of Bhutanese refugees. According to the UNHCR, approximately 113,000 Bhutanese refugees were resettled globally before the closure of the resettlement program in Nepal in 2018. The United States alone resettled 84,819 refugees as of 2015, although numbers declined in subsequent years, with only 19 admitted in the first seven months of 2019.

Many resettled refugees have faced socioeconomic challenges. In the United States, a large proportion live near or below the federal poverty line, with lower rates of high school completion and employment. However, some members of the community have also achieved milestones in civic participation.

In 2019, Bhuwan Pyakurel was elected to the Reynoldsburg, Ohio city council, becoming the first Nepali-Bhutanese elected official in the country. Reynoldsburg was given the nickname "The City of Respect" by Lhotshampa immigrants.

=== Conditions in refugee camps and repatriation efforts ===
Bhutanese refugee camps in eastern Nepal faced difficult conditions, including overcrowding, limited infrastructure, and public health challenges. A joint verification initiative launched by Bhutan and Nepal in the early 2000s aimed to classify refugees for repatriation or naturalization. However, the process collapsed in December 2003 following a violent incident in Jhapa involving the Joint Verification Team.

Efforts to restart repatriation were further hampered by disagreements over criteria for return. Bhutan's 1985 Citizenship Act, which requires proof of residency before 1958 for citizenship eligibility, excluded many refugees who had lived in Bhutan for decades. Human rights organizations have criticized these standards for being overly restrictive and incompatible with international norms, raising concerns about statelessness and the denial of the right to return.

=== Bhutanese refugees scam ===
In 2023, a corruption scandal was uncovered in Nepal involving the fraudulent registration of Nepali citizens as Bhutanese refugees to obtain third-country resettlement. Over 800 individuals were falsely documented in exchange for large bribes. More than 30 people, including former cabinet ministers and senior officials, were arrested on charges of fraud and organized crime. While the case exposed deep-rooted corruption in Nepal's refugee processing system, it should not be confused with the experiences of genuine Bhutanese refugees.

=== Mental health and postmigration challenges ===
Bhutanese refugees resettled abroad, particularly in the United States, have faced elevated risks of depression and suicide. Studies have identified social isolation, postmigration stressors, and intergenerational family conflict as contributing factors. One small-scale study reported that nearly half of respondents had known someone personally who died by suicide. The findings underscore the importance of culturally sensitive mental health services and community support for refugee populations.

== See also ==
- Bhutanese refugees
- Nepali-speaking people in Bhutan
- Bhutanese refugees scam

== Sources ==
- Aris, M. (1979) Bhutan: The Early History of a Himalayan Kingdom, Aris & Phillips: Warminster, UK. ISBN 978-0-85668-199-8.
- Phuntsho, K. (2013) The History of Bhutan, Random House India: Noida. ISBN 8184004117.
- Ther, P. (2012) "Ethnic Cleansing". In Stone, Dan (ed.). The Oxford Handbook of Postwar European History, Oxford University Press: Oxford. ISBN 978-0-19-956098-1.
