= Tri-Ratna Secondary School =

School in Nepal

Coordinates: 26°42.49′N 87°41.24′E

Information
- Established: April 5, 1993; 32 years ago

Tri-ratna secondary school, commonly referred as TRSS, is a Bhutanese refugee based school located in eastern Nepal inside the refugee camp. The school was established for the Bhutanese refugees on 5 April 1993.
