= Danish International Development Agency =

Coordinates: 55.6746°N 12.5891°E

Danish International Development Agency (DANIDA)
- Company type: Parastatal of the Government of Denmark
- Industry: Financial services
- Founded: 1962
- Headquarters: Copenhagen, Denmark
- Key people: Lars Gert Lose; Permanent State Secretary of Foreign Affairs; Jesper Moller Sorensen; State Secretary of Foreign Policy; Lotte Machon; State Secretary of Development Policy; Steen Hommel; State Secretary for Trade and Global Sustainability
- Products: Development finance, small and medium enterprise finance, export finance, import finance, foreign investment finance, development aid
- Website: DANIDA

Danish International Development Agency (DANIDA) is the brand used by the Ministry of Foreign Affairs of Denmark when it provides humanitarian aid and development assistance to other countries, with focus on developing countries. There is no distinct Danida organisation within the Ministry.

According to the OECD, Denmark's total official development assistance (ODA) (US$2.9 billion) increased in 2022 due to in-donor refugee costs. It represented 0.7% of gross national income (GNI). Most of Denmark's official development assistance (ODA) is provided as bilateral co-operation, primarily to fragile partner countries in Africa.

== Origin of name ==
The organisation's name was originally DANAID. In Greek mythology, the Danaids were daughters of Danaus who killed their husbands and were condemned to fill a bathtub with water to wash away their sins. Because the buckets they were given to do this were actually sieves, they worked for all eternity in Tartarus without making any progress. For this reason, the aid agency's name was changed from DANAID to DANIDA at the last minute when this unfortunate connotation was discovered. The term Danida appeared in 1963.

== Overview ==
Denmark has been granting development assistance since the end of the Second World War. It is one of the five countries in the world that meets the United Nations' target of granting 0.7% of gross national income (GNI) in development assistance. In 2011 Denmark disbursed roughly DKK:15.753 billion (US$2.98 billion) in development assistance to countries in Africa, Asia, Latin America, the Middle East, and Denmark's European Union neighbors. Furthermore, DANIDA works in collaboration with many Danish NGOs such as Global Medical Aid. According to the OECD, 2020 official development assistance from Denmark increased 0.5% to US$2.6 billion.

== Focus areas ==
DANIDA focusses on four areas of interest:

- Human rights and democracy
- Green growth
- Social progress
- Stability and protection.

As of 2015, DANIDA was involved in a total of 73 countries and regions across the world, with 21 countries of high priority. Most of the priority countries are among the poorest of the world, located in Africa and Asia.

The sectors receiving the largest amount of financial bilateral support is government and civil society, and humanitarian aid, at roughly 28% and 14% respectively.

Most of the goals of DANIDA's projects gets fulfilled, with an annual success rate between 79% and 88% since 2005.

== History ==
Danish development assistance in the 1950s was nearly exclusively channeled through the United Nations. In 1962, Denmark established its first bilateral development assistance programme for developing countries under the Ministry of Foreign Affairs. In 2010, about 40% of Denmark's bilateral assistance went to social sectors, including education and health. Danida also works in collaboration with the United Nations, the World Bank, regional development banks and the European Union.

== See also ==
- List of development aid agencies
- Australian Agency for International Development
- Canadian International Development Agency
- Department for International Development (UK)
- EuropeAid Development and Cooperation
- French Development Agency
- German International Cooperation
- Irish Aid
- Norwegian Agency for Development Cooperation
- Swedish International Development Cooperation Agency
- Swiss Agency for Development and Cooperation
- United States Agency for International Development
