= Dilliram Sharma Acharya =

Nepali poet

- Born: April 4, 1960 (age 65)
- Occupation: Poet

Dilliram Sharma Acharya (born April 4, 1960) is a poet of the Nepali language from Bhutanese diaspora. He currently lives in Norway. He started writing during his life as a refugee after he was exiled from Bhutan.

== Biography ==
Acharya was born in Sarbang (now Sarpang), Bhutan. He is the first son of Naina Kala Acharya and her husband Dhruba Lal Acharya. He was born after his father had married his step-mother Naina Kala Acharya. He got his early education while he was in Bhutan. In 1990, he was alleged by the Government of Bhutan of being involved in the Bhutanese Democratic revolution. The government publicly issued an arrest warrant. So, in order to escape arrest, he left Bhutan. He spent two years in Assam and Bengal with other Bhutanese refugees in exile. Later, in 1991, he came to Nepal. He then lived in a refugee camp in Jhapa, Nepal.

== Education and work ==
In 1995, he started the class offered by Nepali Bhasa Parisad Bhutan. He was glad to get further education and started spending a lot of time on his course. He worked hard and put his effort to education as much as provided by the organization. He passed B.A. in Nepali literature. In 1996, he was appointed as a Nepali teacher in Marigold Academy School in Beldangi II extension. He did social work in Camp management committee. Acharya spent refugee life in camp for eighteen years and contributed number of literary books in Nepali. He is the first person to begin Epics writing in Bhutanese diaspora.

After the refugee resettlement process, he is residing in Norway now. He is still contributing books and creative knowledge to Bhutanese literature. He has three sons, two daughters and seven grandkids.

== Publications ==
He has written and published books listed below.

1. Epics (Mahakavya): Homeland Epic (2001) “Matri Bhumi Mahakavya”,
2. Radha Epic (2004) “Radha Mahakavya”
3. Spring Epic (2004) “Basanta Mahakavya”
4. Miss Epic (2007) “Kumari Mahakavya”
5. Elegy (Khandakavya): Lightning lyrical elegy (2001) “Chatyang Khandakavya”
6. Sarita elegy (2002) “Sarita Khandakavya”
7. Stories/Novels/ Essays: Description of Bhutanese Movement (poetry collection)
8. Domestic Violence and Ways to control it (2007)
9. The days after the deprivation of country (2006)
10. Collection of Political articles (2008)

== Awards and honours ==
He was honored by Literature council of Bhutan at Cincinnati Ohio on June 10, 2018. He was awarded by Sahitya Alankar Guthi Khudunabari Jhapa Nepal. He was also awarded by Bhutanese management committee in 2005 Belgadi Jhapa Nepal.
