= Sanischare refugee camp =

Refugee camp in Nepal

Coordinates: 26°39′37″N 87°33′4″E

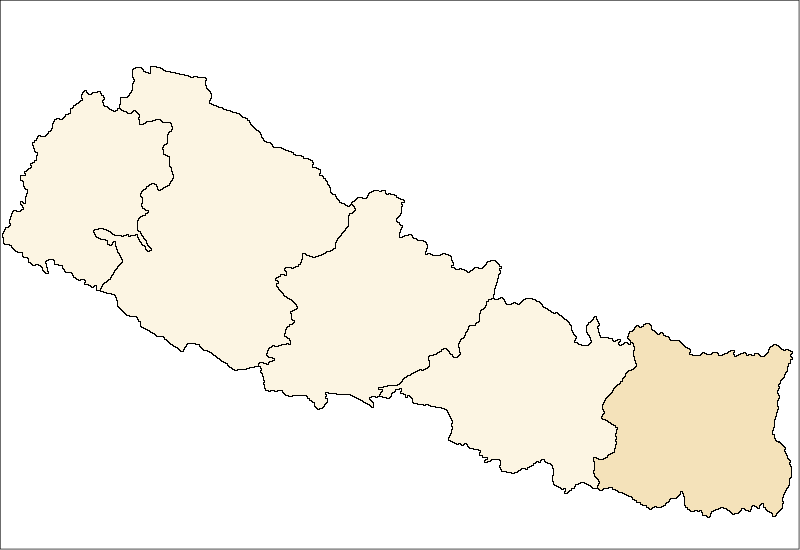
Bhutanese refugee camps in Eastern Nepal; Sanischare in gold.

Sanischare refugee camp (Nepali: शनिस्चरे शरणार्थी शिविर; Śaniscare śaraṇārthī śivira), located near Sanischare, Kosi, Nepal, is home to some 13,323 Bhutanese refugees. The camp lies on the south side of the East-West Highway, and contains the New Horizon Academy.

In March 2011, a fire burned much of the camp destroying about 1,200 homes. The same day, another fire also struck Goldhap, another Bhutanese refugee camp in Nepal.

== See also ==
- Bhutanese refugees
