= Bhutanese Australians =

- (Bhutan) (Australia)

Total population
- 12,002 (2021)

Regions with significant populations
- Western Australia: 4,372
- South Australia: 1,793
- Queensland: 1,444

Languages
- Dzongkha, English

Religion
- Buddhism; Hinduism

Related ethnic groups
- Nepalese Australians

Bhutanese Australians are immigrants and expatriates from the country of Bhutan and their descendants.

== History ==
Beginning in the 1960s, a number of Bhutanese officials came to Australia to receive education or training under the Colombo Plan.

Since the re-opening of Australian borders after the COVID-19 pandemic, over 12,000 Bhutanese have immigrated to Australia. These immigrants have enrolled themselves in hospitality fields such as childcare.

Bhutan has experienced a brain drain due to the exodus of young professionals and students from the country.

== Demographics ==
Perth has the largest Bhutanese population in Australia. As of 2022, Bhutan was the most common non-Australian country of birth for residents in the adjoining Perth suburbs of Osborne Park, Glendalough, and Wembley, with around 21 percent of Glendalough residents born in Bhutan.
