= Tek Nath Rizal =

Bhutanese politician

- Born: February 16, 1948 (age 78); Lami Dada, Bhutan
- Occupations: political & human rights activist

Tek Nath Rizal (Nepali: टेकनाथ रिजाल) (also spelled Rijal) is one of the Bhutanese refugees, and a political and human rights activist.

Rizal has struggled for the sake of about 100,000 Bhutani refugees who lived for a long time in camps in Nepal. Rizal was imprisoned by the government of Bhutan from 1989 to 1999 at the Chamgang jail. He had been arrested by Nepalese authorities in Nepal where he had escaped to after protesting against the Bhutanese government's approach to the Bhutanese refugee problem. According to Amnesty International, he was a prisoner of conscience, held by Bhutan "for the peaceful expression of his political beliefs, in particular his campaign against government policies unfairly affecting members of the Nepali-speaking community in southern Bhutan." He was sentenced in 1993 to life imprisonment. Amnesty International and U.S. Department of State considered him as a political prisoner and could win his release from jail.

The Bhutanese government found Tek Nath Rizal guilty of abusing his position as an elected Royal Advisory Councillor by providing false feedback from the people he represented to the King, and then blaming the government and King for the policies formulated based on his advice. The rift between the people in the south of Bhutan and the government has at least in small part been blamed on his actions. After his sentencing, the King of Bhutan, Jigme Singye Wangchuck, pardoned Rizal on condition that Bhutan and Nepal be able to resolve the issue over the Bhutanese refugees in Nepal. The issue was not resolved, but Rizal was released from prison during an amnesty granted by the king in December 1999. Rizal attributed his release to the efforts of activists from around the world who pressed for his release.

Tek Nath Rizal was released by the government unconditionally and he has since settled in Nepal.

In July 2026 he was sentenced to two years in prison for fraud and document forgery due to his role in the Bhutanese refugees scam.

== Publications ==
1. Torture Killing Me Softly
2. From Palace to Prison
3. Nirbasan (Nepali)

== See also ==
- Human rights in Bhutan
