= Timai refugee camp =

Refugee camp in Nepal

Coordinates: 26°44′37.8″N 88°4′39.5″E

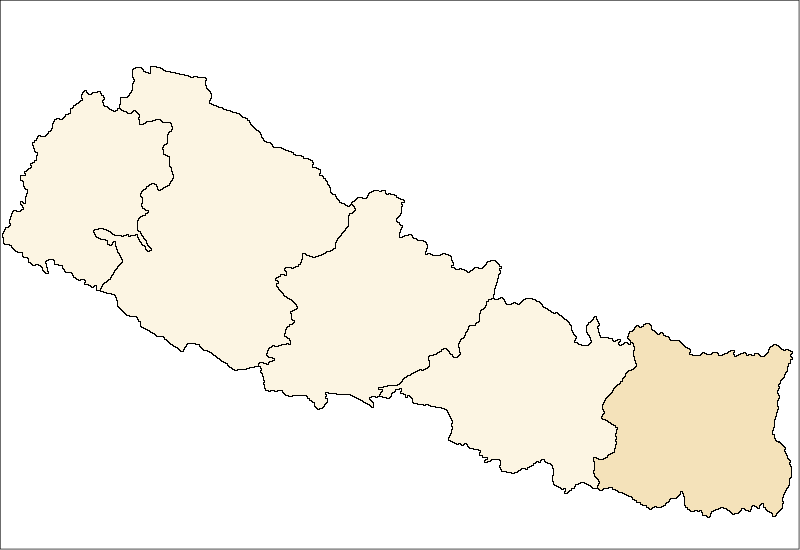
Bhutanese refugee camps in Eastern Nepal; Timai in green.

Timai refugee camp (Nepali: टिमाइ शरणार्थी शिविर; Timāi śaraṇārthī śivira), located in Jhapa District, Nepal, was home to more than 10,000 Bhutanese refugees. Timai camp is one of the seven Bhutanese refugee camps located in the east of Nepal. The camp is located along both the east and west sides of Limbuwan Highway 72 near its terminus at Limbuwan Highway 07. To the east of the refugee camp flows the Timai River, a tributary of the Mechi River and a large Shantinagar village. To the west of Timai camp, there are some fertile farming lands owned by nearby locals and then there are small villages and towns knowns as Aitabre, Barne, and so on. The camp is abutted by health centers and a small army barrack in the center. To its north, some locals resides in a small village called Bajo-kheth which was also the closest among all nearby villages. To the south is manglabare and others. The Camp was divided into four main sectors (A-D) and seventeen sub-sectors (A1-A4, B1-B4, C1-C4, D1-D5). Timai Camp geographically settled vertically alongside the Timai River, sub-sector A/2 and B/4 settled on the northern part and sub-sector D/2, D/3, and B/3 along with an elementary school on the southern part of the camp.

Timai refugee camp was the second refugee camp that was formed after Beldangi refugee camp was crowded in early 1990s when there was a massive influx of Bhutanese citizen who were evicted by the Bhutanese government. The Bhutanese authority adopted one-nation one people policy (ethnic cleansing policy).

== Camp Management ==
The camp was being managed by the refugee volunteers with the minimal support from the international organization and Nepal government.

Currently, the camp has been closed after the majority of refugees got resettled in the western countries. The few hundred of remaining refugees who did not opt for third-country resettlement have been relocated to Beldangi camp.
