= Goldhap =

Coordinates: 26°33′N 87°58′E

Goldhhap गोलधाप
- Village development committee
- Interactive map of Goldhhap
- Country: Nepal
- Province: Province No. 1
- District: Jhapa District

Population (1992)
  - Total: 7,393
- Time zone: UTC+5:45 (Nepal Time)

Goldhap is a village development committee in Jhapa District in the Province No. 1 of south-eastern Nepal. At the time of the 1991 Nepal census, it had a population of 7,393 in 1,252 households.
