= Pathari Shanishchare Municipality =

Pathari Shanishchare पथरी-शनिश्चरे प. श. नगरपालिका
- Municipality (नगरपालिका)
- Location in Nepal
- Coordinates: 26.64°N 87.59°E
- Country: Nepal
- Zone: Koshi
- District: Morang

Government
  - Type: Mayor–council
  - Mayor: Mr. Mohan Prasad Tumwapo (NCP-UML)
  - Deputy Mayor: Mrs. Devi Maya Kafle (NCP-UML)

Population (2011)
  - Total: 49,808
- Time zone: UTC+5:45 (NST)
- Area code: 56600
- Website: official website

Pathari Shanishchare (पथरी-शनिश्चरे) is a municipality in Morang District in the Koshi Zone of south-eastern Nepal. It was formed by merging three existing village development committees i.e. Hasandaha, Pathari and Sanischare in May 2014.

== location and history ==
The Municipality is situated in the eastern part of Morang District.

This municipality is a well developed area with many facilities that include Heal Health care, Communication, education etc. At the time of the 1991 Nepal census it had a population of 17,193 people living in 2199 individual households. According to the census of 2011, Total population of this municipality after merging three VDCs is 80605. The Municipality consists of 10 wards.
