= Global Medical Aid =

- Founded: 2010
- Founder: President Hans-Frederik Dydensborg
- Type: Medical Humanitarian Organization
- Location: Birkerød, Denmark
- Key people: President Hans-Frederik Dydensborg
- Website: www.globalmedicalaid.com

Global Medical Aid is a Danish humanitarian non-governmental charity organization, founded in 2010 by Hans-Frederik Dydensborg, Advocate of the Supreme Court (Denmark), who in 2012 was nominated to Hero of the Year by the Danish newspaper Jyllands-Posten. All members of GMA work on a voluntary basis.

The purpose of GMA is to donate non-expired medicine and functional hospital equipment, collected from the pharmaceutical corporations, hospitals and health care companies to developing nations to benefit of their poor patients. Consequently, GMA is collaborating with Ministries of Health, potentially international organizations.

== Characteristics ==
No donation will be given, unless a medical representative declares, that the donated medicine most likely can be used before the expiry date and that the equipment can be used, maintained and repaired by the recipient.

GMA is financed by private grants and funds only, including covering of some costs from the receivers, free transportation from logistic firms or other free services. Maersk Line, Royal Danish Air Force, United Nations Population Fund (UNFPA) and Beredskabsforbundet have collaborated with GMA.

By August 2017 GMA has donated medicine and hospital equipment at a value of more than 22 million US Dollars to 13 countries such as, Afghanistan, Benin, Burkina Faso, Macedonia, Nepal, Sri Lanka, Ukraine.

== Afghanistan ==
Five shipments between 2010 and 2013 at a value of 439.000 US Dollars were sent to the Helmand Province. The shipments were completed with the help of the Danish Defence who packed the medicine and equipment whilst the Royal Danish Air Force shipped the goods by air to the Helmand Province. In Afghanistan, the Danish Defence stood for the distribution of the medicine and equipment.

== Benin ==
Nineteen shipments between 2012 and 2014 at a value of 4.343.000 US Dollars were sent to the Beninese Ministry of Health and Military Hospitals. Maersk Line covered the charges of transporting 700 hospital beds in fourteen containers. Former President of Benin, Thomas Boni Yayi, thanked Global Medical Aid for their participation in improving the healthcare system of Benin through the donations made. The Danish M. D., Jesper Sylvest, has written a report on Global Medical Aid's work in Benin. The report was presented to The Foreign Affairs Committee of the Danish Parliament. Importantly, the report pointed out that cooperation with a Local NGO is a fundamental key to making sure that hospital equipment will be placed in the correct facilities, be in use by hospital employees and make sure that maintenance of the equipment is facilitated. The report was given to President Thomas Boni Yayi during the audience (meeting).

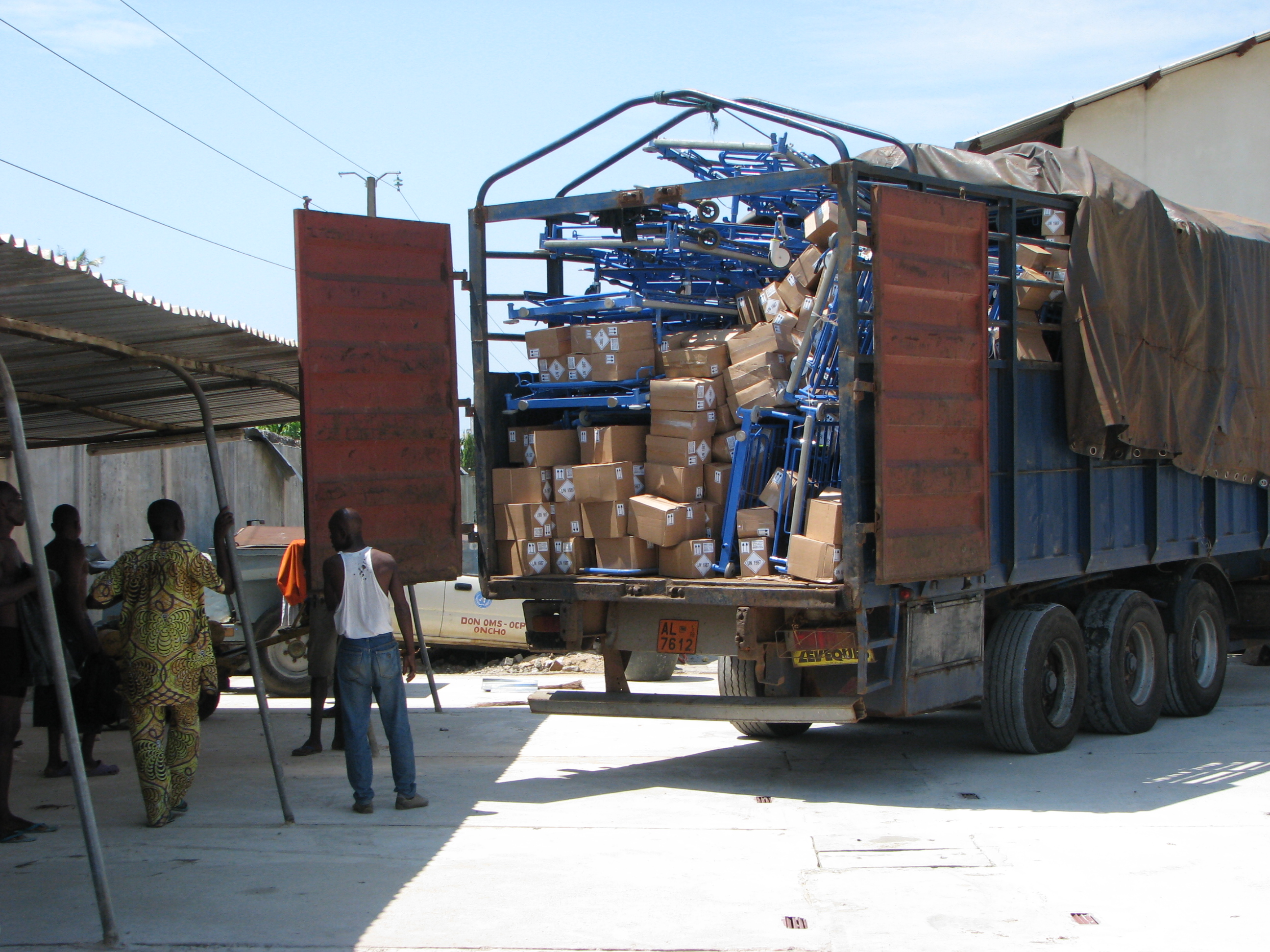
Arrival of beds

== Burkina Faso ==
Eleven shipments between 2010 and 2013 at a value of 6.200.000 US Dollars were sent to the Burkinabe Ministry of Health and University Hospital.

== North Macedonia ==
Two shipments between 2012 and 2013 at a value of 127.000 US Dollars to a regional hospital in Gostivar, Macedonia.

== Nepal ==
Thirteen shipments between 2010 and 2012 at a value of 1.484.000 US Dollars to the Nepalese Ministry of Health and an international organization.

== Sri Lanka ==
Fourteen shipments between 2010 and 2013 at a value of 2.218.000 US Dollars to the Ministry of Health, Northern and Eastern provinces.

== Ukraine ==
Twenty-five shipments between 2014 and 2017 at a value of around 5.500.000 US Dollars to the Ministry of Health, Military Hospitals and private organizations. Global Medical Aid has also donated six ambulances to Ukraine including four ambulances to Ukrainian paratroopers in Eastern Ukraine. Additionally, GMA donated 8,000 antibiotic treatments and 10,000 hospital uniforms together with other hospital equipment such as beds and operation tables. In 2017, GMA collaborated with Vingmed A/S and UNFPA in donating 8 refurbished blood fractionation machines and 65 refurbished blood collection mixers to the Public Health Department of the Ministry of Health of Ukraine. During the handover ceremony, President Dydensborg received accolades from Bohdan Pidverbetskyy of UNFPA Ukraine and Liudmyla Zanevska from the Kyiv Blood Center.
