= Khudunabari refugee camp =

Refugee camp in Nepal

Coordinates: 26°42′49.6″N 87°57′38.7″E

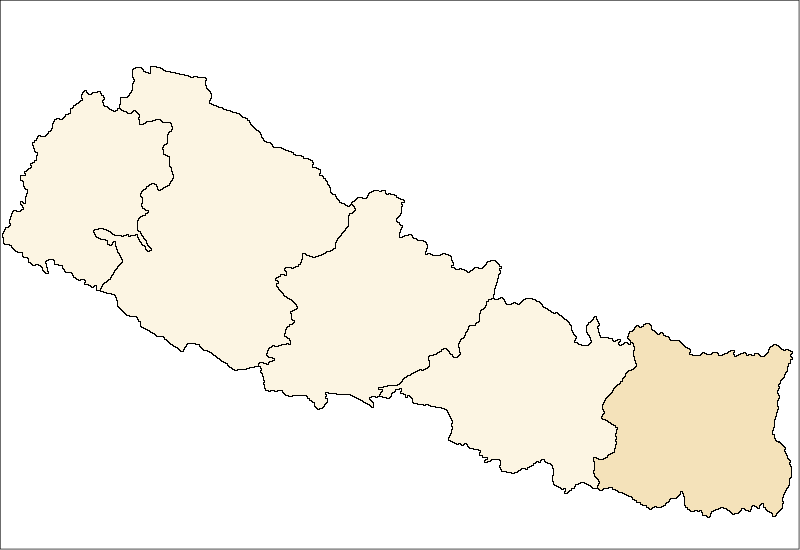
Bhutanese refugee camps in Eastern Nepal; Khudunabari in blue.

Khudunabari refugee camp (Nepali: खुदुनाबारी शरणार्थी शिविर; Khudunābārī śaraṇārthī śivira), located to the northwest of Sanischare, Kosi, Nepal, is home to some 10,688 Bhutanese refugees. The camp lies at a river confluence, between Sanischare Road and Limbuwan Road 37.

== See also ==
- Bhutanese refugees
