= Lhotshampa people =

Bhutanese people of Nepalese descent

Lhotshampa
ल्होत्साम्पा ལྷོ་མཚམས་པ་
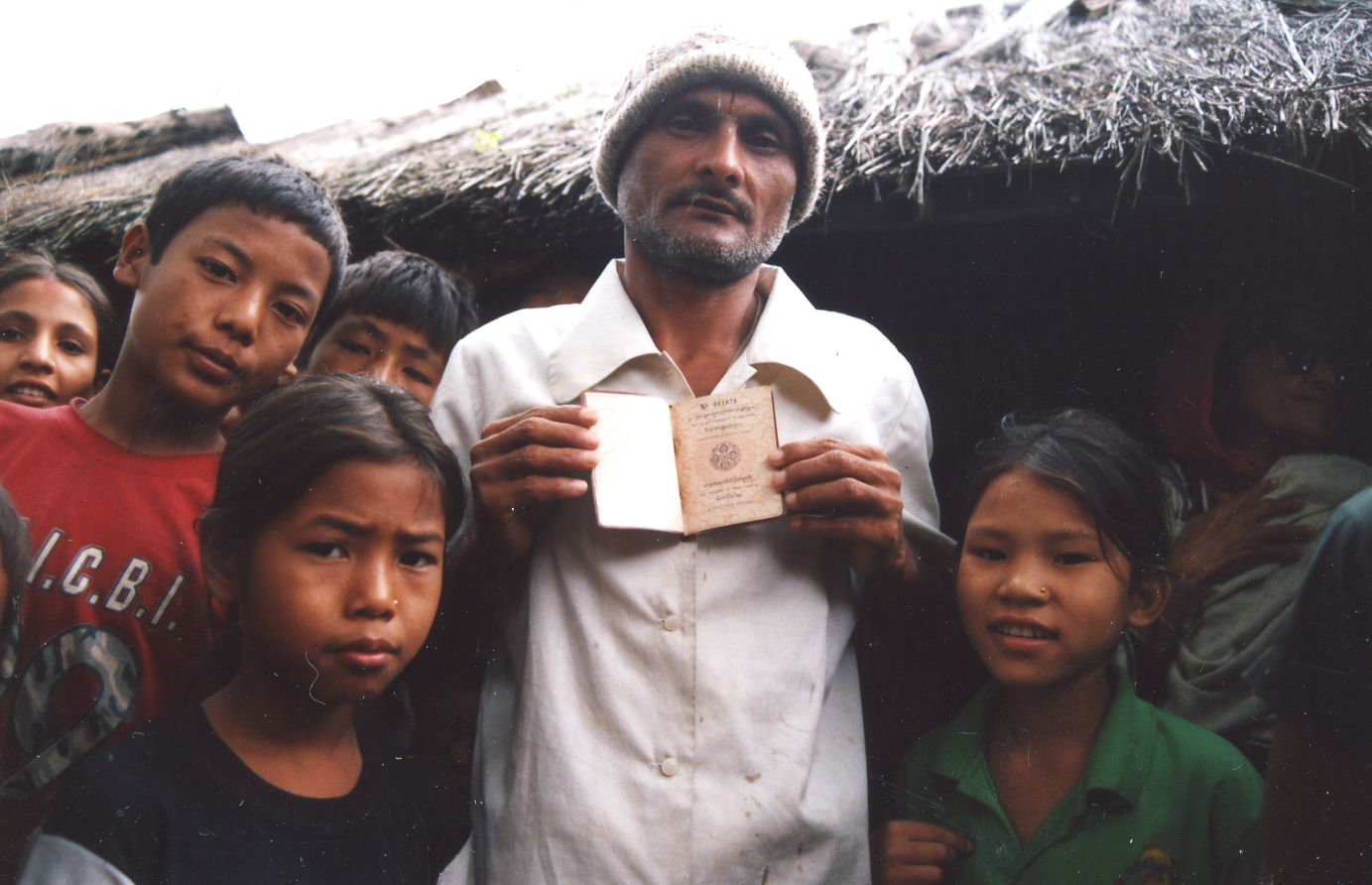
- Lhotshampa refugees in Beldangi camp in Nepal. The man is holding a Bhutanese passport.

Total population
- 242,000

Regions with significant populations
- United States; Nepal; Thimphu; Paro; Phuntsholing

Languages
- Nepali; Dzongkha

Religion
- Hinduism (majority) Buddhism; Kiratism (minority)

Related ethnic groups
- Indo-Aryans: Bahun, Chhetri, Khas people, Newar people Tibeto-Burman: Newar people, Limbu people,Rai people,Tamang people,Sherpa people,Gurung people,Magar people

The Lhotshampa or Lhotsampa (Nepali: ल्होत्साम्पा; Dzongkha: ལྷོ་མཚམས་པ་) people are a heterogeneous Bhutanese people who migrated from Nepal starting in the late 19th and early 20th centuries, though some arrived as late as the 1970s. The Lhotshampa were estimated by the U.S. Department of State to comprise around 35% of Bhutan's population as of 2008. The Lhotshampa are predominantly Hindu and Buddhist, who speak the Nepali language.

The Lhotshampa community includes both Indo-Aryan and Tibeto-Burman ethnic groups, each with its own language.

Indo-Aryan Communities in southern Bhutan—such as the Bahun (Brahmin) and Chhetri speak Nepali (an Indo-Aryan language) as their mother tongue.

Tibeto-Burman Communities in southern Bhutan—such as the Gurung, Rai, Limbu, Magar, Lepcha, Tamang and Sherpa—belong to the Tibeto-Burman language family. Historically, each of these groups spoke its own distinct language.

Over time, however, the majority of Tibeto-Burman communities in southern Bhutan have lost their mother tongues and adopted Nepali, the mother tongue of the Bahun and Chhetri communities, as their primary language.

People of Nepali origin started to settle in uninhabited areas of southern Bhutan in the 19th century. The term "Lhotshampa", which means "southern borderlanders" in Dzongkha, began to be used by the Bhutanese state in the second half of the twentieth century to refer to the population of people of Nepali origin in the south of the country. By the 1990s, over 100,000 Lhotshampa had been forcibly displaced and removed from Bhutan.

After being displaced as a result of state violence and ethnic cleansing, and then living in refugee camps in eastern parts of Nepal, starting in 2007 most of the Bhutanese refugees were resettled under international refugee conventions to a number of countries outside the region, such as the United States, Canada, Australia, the United Kingdom, and other European countries. As of 2021, the number of Lhotshampa who remain in Nepal is significantly lower than that in the United States and other countries where they have resettled.

== History ==
=== Early immigration ===
The first small groups of Nepalis emigrated primarily from eastern Nepal under British auspices in the late sixteenth and early seventeenth centuries. The beginning of Nepali immigration largely coincided with Bhutan's political development: in 1885, Druk Gyalpo Ugyen Wangchuck consolidated power after a period of civil unrest and cultivated closer ties with the British ruled India.

In 1910, the government of Bhutan signed a treaty with the British Raj, granting them control over Bhutan's foreign relations. The actual immigrants registered and settled through the agent from Kalimpong, Raja Ugen Dorji and (son) Raja Sonam Togbay Dorji started in the reigns of the second and third kings. Immigrants from Nepal and British ruled India continued to enter Bhutan with an increase from the 1960s when Bhutan's first modern five-year plan began, many arriving as construction workers.

=== 1960s-present ===
The government traditionally attempted to limit immigration and restrict Nepalis' residences and employment to the southern region. Liberalization measures in the 1970s and 1980s encouraged intermarriage and provided increasing opportunities for public service. The government allowed more internal migration by Nepalis seeking better education and business opportunities.

In the 1980s and 1990s, the most divisive issue in Bhutan was the accommodation of the Nepali Hindu minority. In 1988, the government census recategorized people with Nepali heritage as illegal immigrants. Local Lhotshampa leaders responded with antigovernmental protests demanding citizenship and damaged government institutions.

In 1989, the Bhutanese government enacted reforms that directly impacted the Lhotshampa. First, it elevated the status of the national dress code of the Driglam namzha from recommended to mandatory. All citizens including the Lhotshampa were required to observe the dress code in public during business hours. This decree was resented by the Lhotshampa who complained about being forced to wear the clothing of the Ngalong majority. Second, the government removed Nepali as a language of instruction in schools in favor of Dzongkha, the national language. This alienated the Lhotshampa, many of whom knew no Dzongkha at all.

=== Expulsion ===
Since the late 1980s, over 100,000 Lhotshampa have been forced out of Bhutan, accused by the government of being illegal immigrants. Between 1988 and 1993, thousands of others left, alleging ethnic and political repression.

In a 1992 interview with the Calcutta Statesman, Bhutanese foreign minister Dawa Tsering stated that an increase in the country's Nepali population would lead the country to become "another Sikkim and Darjeeling".

In 1990, violent ethnic unrest and anti-government protests in southern Bhutan pressed for greater democracy and respect for minority rights. That year, the Bhutan Peoples' Party, whose members are mostly Lhotshampa, began a campaign of violence against the Bhutanese government. In the wake of this unrest, thousands fled Bhutan. Bill Frelick of Human Rights Watch reported that state security forces forcibly removed ethnic Lhotshampa from their homes and coerced them into renouncing their citizenship. A refugee accounted that:

"The army took all the people from their houses... As we left Bhutan, we were forced to sign the document. They snapped our photos. The man told me to smile, to show my teeth. He wanted to show that I was leaving my country willingly, happily, that I was not forced to leave"

Many of them have either entered Nepal's seven refugee camps (on 20 January 2010, 85,544 refugees resided in the camps) or are working in India. According to U.S. State Department estimates in 2008, about 35% of the population of Bhutan is Lhotshampa.

== Culture ==
Traditionally, the Lhotshampa have been involved mostly in sedentary agriculture, although some have cleared forest cover and conducted tsheri and slash and burn agriculture. The Lhotshampa are generally classified as Hindus. However, this is an oversimplification as many groups that include Tamang and the Gurung are largely Buddhist; the Kiranti groups that include the Rai and Limbu are largely animist followers of Mundhum (these latter groups are mainly found in eastern Bhutan). Whether they are Hindu or Tibetan Buddhist, most of them abstain from beef, notably those belonging to the orthodox classes who are vegetarians. Their main festivals include Dashain and Tihar.

== Language ==
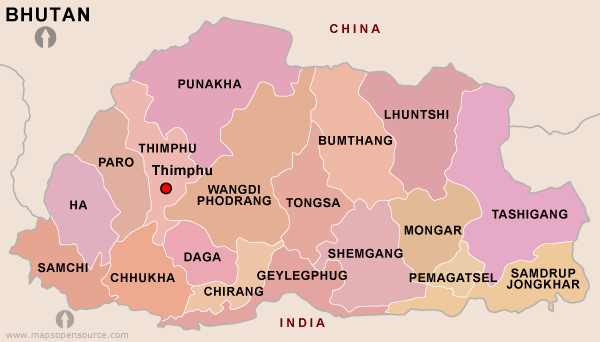
Political Map of Bhutan showing most districts (missing Gasa District). The people of Lhotshampa are located in the Southern part of Bhutan, in Samchi, Tsirang and Geylegphug-Gepephu (now Sarpang).

Dagana, Samdrubjongkhar

Lhotshampas speak Nepali as their first language. Samchi, Chirang and Sarpang are southern dzongkhags that have a large Lhotshampa community where most people speak Nepali. In southern Bhutan, Nepali used to be taught in the school and was spoken and written in these areas. However, this changed during the 1980s when there was racial conflict between Nepali in Bhutan and Bhutanese. Since then, Nepali is only taught in the home and has become a spoken language in Bhutan. Thus, some Nepali speakers from southern Bhutan cannot read or write in Nepali. Currently, Nepali is the first language for most southern Bhutanese and most people use it in their home. Also, Nepali is most commonly used in school outside of the classes.

Nepali in Bhutan is different in the rural areas and Thimphu. Also, some Nepali words are used differently in Bhutan than Nepali in Nepal.

=== Vocabulary differences ===
==== Nepali words in Bhutan and Nepal ====
English	Nepali in Bhutan (Lhotshamkha)	Nepali in Nepal
Brother	Daju	Dai/Daju
Dirty	Maila	Phor/Maila
Door	Dailo	Dhoka/Dailo
Pea	Matar	Kerau/Matar
Shop	Dokan	pasal/Dokan
Throw	Phag	Phal/phyak
Vegetable	Sabji	Tarkari/sabji
Vehicle	Gadi	Motor/Gadi
Wait	Parkhi	parkhi/Parkha
Window	Khirkey	jhyal

== Notable Lhotsampas ==
- Tek Nath Rizal, Bhutanese politician
- Indra Adhikari, journalist
- Mangala Sharma, human and women's rights activist
- Rangu Pati Suberi, Political activists and Human right advocate for Stateless Bhutanese within Bhutan.
- Hiranyamayee Lama, politician
- Loknath Sharma, politician
- Jai Bir Rai, politician
- Dilliram Sharma Acharya, Bhutanese poet in Nepali language
- Biren Basnet, footballer
- Khare Basnet, footballer
- Hemlal Bhattrai, footballer
- Mon Bhattrai, footballer
- Dhan Bahadur Biswa, footballer
- Dinesh Chhetri, footballer
- Hari Gurung, footballer
- Karun Gurung, footballer
- Man Bahadur Gurung, footballer
- Puspalal Sharma, footballer
- Diwash Subba, footballer
- Anju Gurung, women's cricketer
- Roshan Chhetri, CEO and Entrepreneur

== See also ==
- Immigration in Bhutan
- Demographics of Bhutan
- Ethnic groups in Bhutan
- Bhutanese diaspora
