= Bhutan Peoples' Party =

Bhutan Peoples' Party ༄། །བྷུ་ཀྲན་པི་པཱལྶ་པ་ཀྲི།། भूटान पिपल्स पार्टी
- Leader: Balaram Poudyal
- Spokesperson: Gopal Gurung
- Vice Chairman: Durga Giri
- Founder: R.K. Budathoki
- Founded: 2 June 1990 (36 years ago)
- Headquarters: Kathmandu, Nepal
- Ideology: Democratic socialism Lhotshampa interests
- Political position: Left-wing

Party flag

Website
- www.bpparty.org

The Bhutan Peoples' Party (BPP; Dzongkha: ༄། །བྷུ་ཀྲན་པི་པཱལྶ་པ་ཀྲི།།; Nepali: भूटान पिपल्स पार्टी) is a democratic socialist political party, currently working in exile in Nepal. Founded on 2 June 1990 in West Bengal, it was the pioneer political party in Bhutan. The Bhutan Peoples' Party was founded to represent the Nepali citizens of Bhutan, who felt discriminated against by the Bhutanese monarchy and under-represented in the institutions of the country.

== Overview ==
The Bhutan Peoples' Party was involved in the organization of mass protest rallies in the south of the country in September and October 1990 in peaceful rallies; the party was declared illegal by the absolute monarch and banned from the country along with other parties formed during the same period.

On September 9, 2001, the party founder and first leader R.K. Budathoki was assassinated in a small town called Damak that lies in Jhapa district of eastern Nepal and a few miles away from Beldangi refugee camps.

Still in exile in Nepal, the Bhutan Peoples' Party asked to be registered as a political party when the Bhutanese government first introduced a multiparty system. This request was turned down by the Bhutanese Election Commission in January 2008, and the party was prevented from competing in Bhutan's first ever elections in March 2008. Indeed, only two "loyal" (pro-monarchy) parties were allowed to compete.

== See also ==
- List of political parties in Bhutan
- 2008 Bhutanese general election
- Politics of Bhutan
