= Beldangi refugee camps =

Refugee camps in Nepal

The Beldangi refugee camps (Nepali: बेलडाँगी शरणार्थी शिविर; Belḍā̃gī śaraṇārthī śivira) consist of three settlements in Damak, Jhapa District, Nepal: Beldangi I (26°43′22.7″N 87°41′57.8″E), Beldangi II, and Beldangi III Extension (26°42′48.9″N 87°41′6.4″E). They are inhabited by Bhutanese refugees. As of 2011, Beldangi I to the east had 12,793 residents; Beldangi II to the west had 14,680; and Beldangi III Extension had 8,470. The three camps are located near each other, off main highways LD Rd 15 and DL1, which separates Beldangi I from a nearby river.

== Beldangi 2 ==
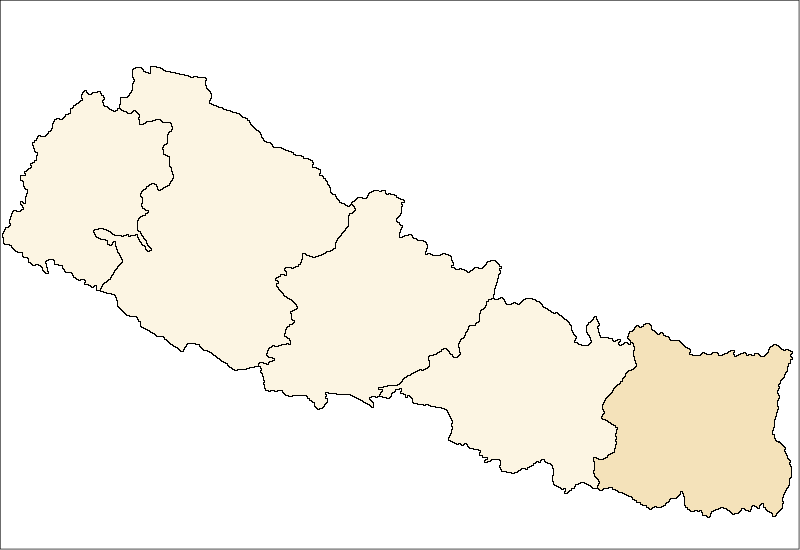
Bhutanese refugee camps in Eastern Nepal; Beldangi camps in purple.

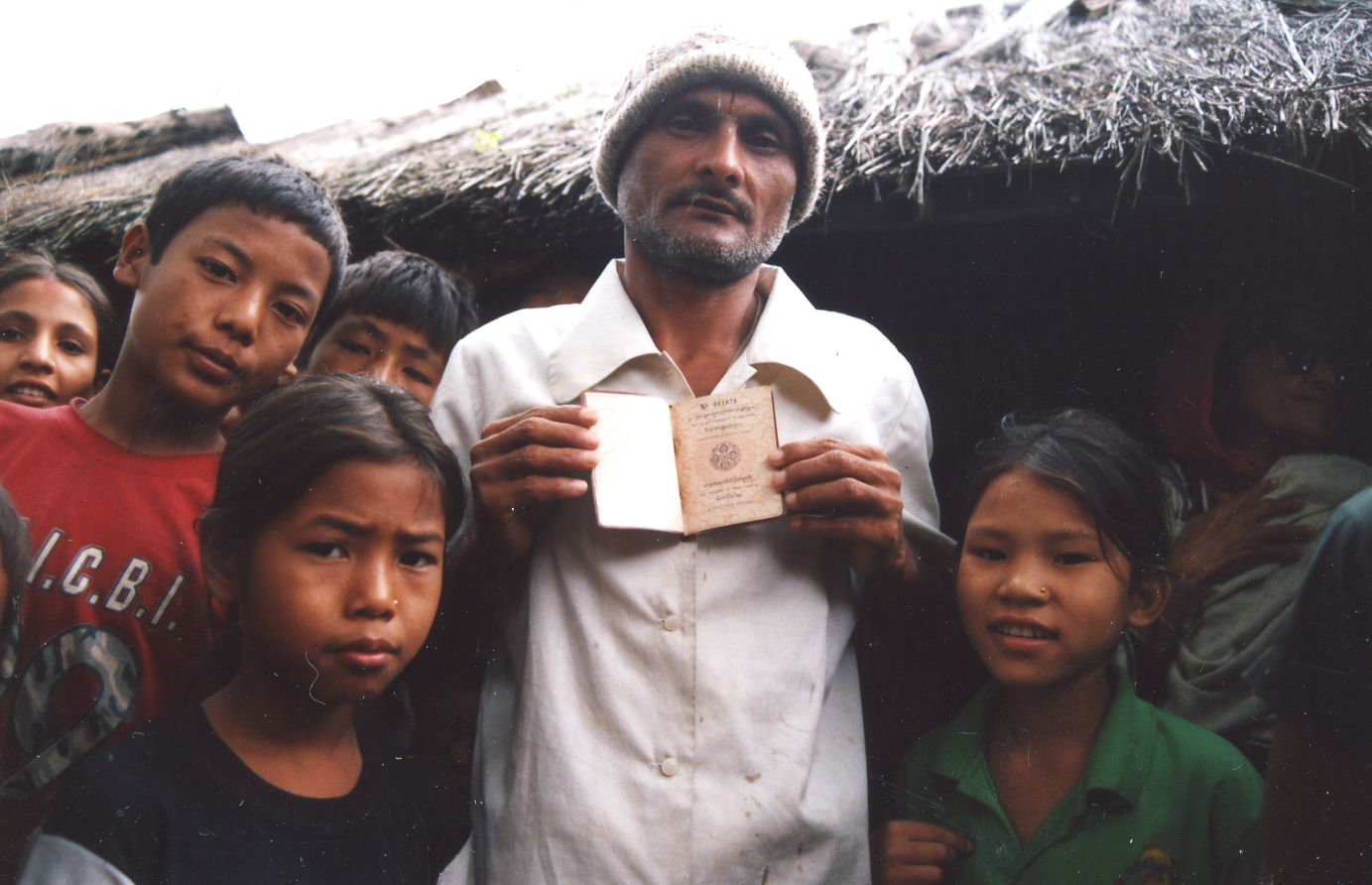
Bhutanese refugees in Beldangi I presenting a Bhutanese passport

Beldangi 2 was cleared for settlement in the early 90s. Bhutanese exiles were given refuge by the government of Nepal on humanitarian grounds and were temporarily settled in Maidhar by the side of the Kankai river, some 600 km east of Kathmandu. Slowly, other international organizations, including UNHCR and the International Red Cross Society, started helping them, providing food and clothing. Gradually the population of these refugees swelled and were moved to refugee camps within Jhapa and Morang Districts of Nepal lying under Mechi Zone Far eastern Zones among which Beldangi-2 has been the largest and biggest camp.

The vast jungle of Beldangi 2 was made suitable for settlement in early 1991, as the Maidhar camp was not suitable for the growing number of refugees. In the beginning, there were several big trees inside the camp which eventually were cut down by the Authorities. Human settlement began from Sector A and the plots to the north filled up gradually as more and more refugees poured in. Any one who visited this camp in the early and mid 1990s would have seen hundreds of colorful huts with plastic roofs. There were no toilets for them in the camp, so the refugees had to go to the nearby forest. Thus, the environment was alarmingly polluted posing serious threat on refugees' health. Refugee students used to study in an open ground. Books and stationery were very limited and were to be shared among many. There were skilled teachers, yet the education system was at stake with insufficient teaching/learning materials. Slowly, the Agencies helped build, schools, health centers and toilets – one toilet for two families. Gravel roads within the camp were constructed to ease the transportation.

By the end of 1999, more and more trees had been chopped away. Refugees modeled and remodeled their huts and started extending them even without giving notice to the authority concerned. Schools were built in almost all the nine sectors, and the number of health centres multiplied. The literacy rate of the refugees swelled. The younger generation started moving out of the camp after graduating from the camps schools, seeking a better future.

Housing some 20,000 refugees, Beldangi 2 is located 4 miles north of Damak, a small town on the Mahendra Highway, the longest highway of Nepal. The camp is divided into nine sectors for the efficient and effective administration. Each of the sectors are further divided into 4 units which means that the whole camp consists of 36 units. Each sectors are geographically separated by the gravelled roads. The refugee camp is surrounded in the North and east by community forest known as Humsedumshe. The Beldangi 2 extension, also locally called Beldangi 3, lies in the west and to the south lies a small market called Bangay.

The thatch roofed huts of the refugees are constructed in rows, with toilets between each pair of rows. This camp has two secondary level schools, Tri-Ratna Secondary School and Pancha-oti English School, managed by Caritas Nepal. It also has five primary and two lower secondary schools. In 2006, there were 22,542 refugees in Bledangi 2 refugee camps. 3,604 huts were officially counted during the same year but due to rapid birth rate, migration of the refugees to foreign lands and many other factors the present figure might be different. The population of Bhutanese refugees in this camp has been reduced by half. The evacuated huts are either demolished, destroyed or occupied by some other refugees within the camp.

=== Current situation ===
As of 2014, as a result of the resettlement in the west, the three other Bhutanese refugee camps in the east viz. Khudunabari, Timai and Goldhap have been consolidated and all the remaining refugees living in those camps have been shifted to Beldangi and Pathri refugee camps. This action has again made the refugee population of Beldangi swell up to cross the previous figure. As of the last week of April 2014, the International Organization for Migration (IOM), which is responsible for the refugees' resettlement, has said that 89,000 refugees have been resettled in eight countries, with US hosting 75,000 among others The population of the Beldangi 2 Camp is now estimated to be around 15,000.

== See also ==
- Bhutanese refugees
