= Bhutanese refugees =

Lhotshampas, a group of Nepali language speaking Bhutanese people

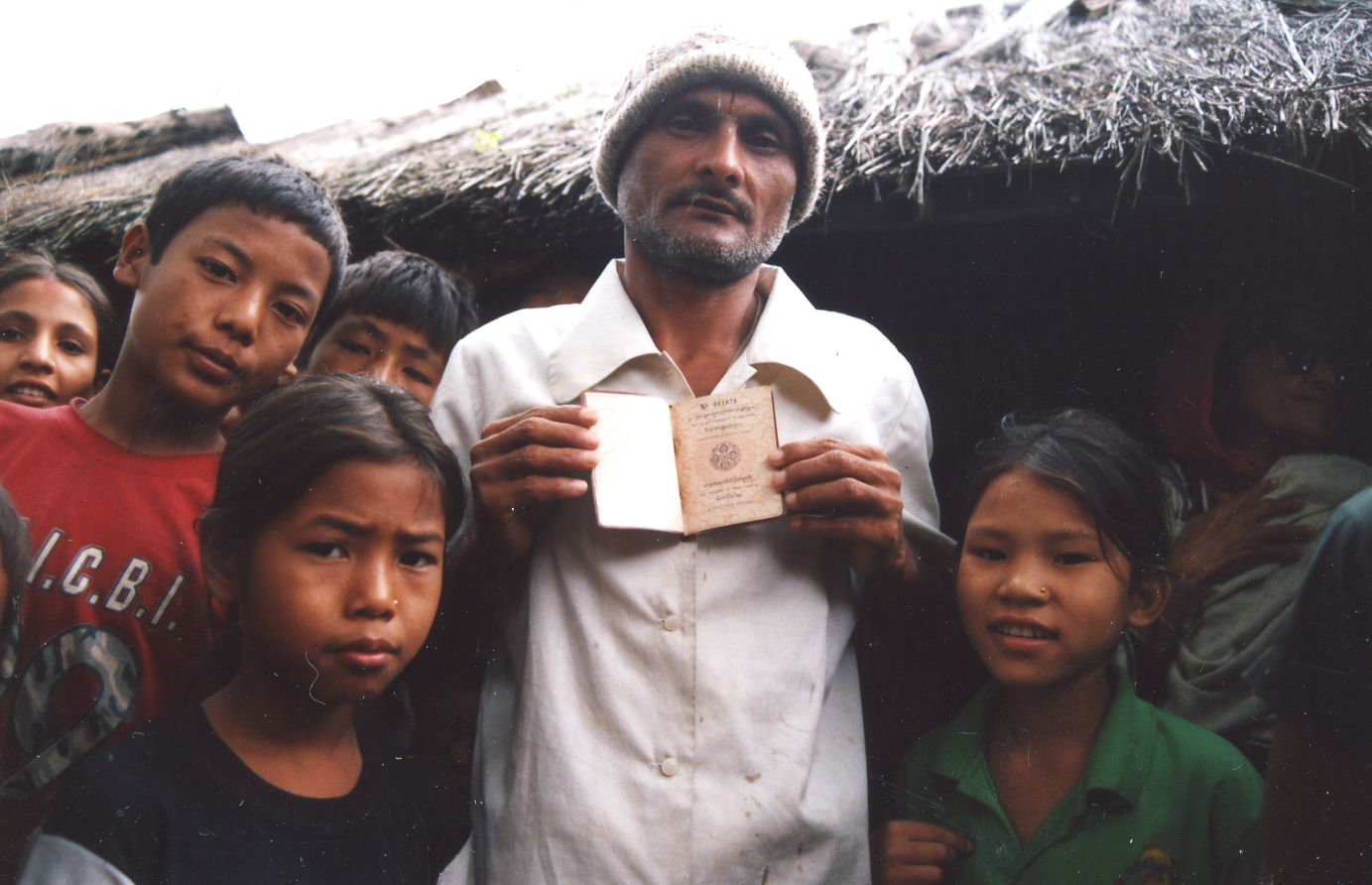
Bhutanese refugees in a Beldangi refugee camp; one man shows his Bhutanese passport document. Many Bhutanese refugees surreptitiously took their citizenship papers and documentation with them when they were forcefully deported from Bhutan to prove their status as legal citizens.

Bhutanese refugees are Lhotshampas ("southerners"), a group of Nepali language-speaking Bhutanese people. These refugees registered in refugee camps in eastern Nepal during the 1990s as Bhutanese citizens who fled or had been deported from Bhutan during the protest against the Bhutanese government by some Lhotshampas. Protestors had called for their own choice of leader distinct from the jurisdiction of the royal government in Bhutan. As Nepal and Bhutan had yet to implement an agreement on repatriation, most Bhutanese refugees have since resettled in North America, Oceania and Europe under the auspices of the Office of the United Nations High Commissioner for Refugees.

== Historical background ==
The earliest surviving records of Bhutan's history show that Tibetan influence already existed from the 6th century. King Songtsen Gampo, who ruled Tibet from 627 to 649, was responsible for the construction of Bhutan's oldest surviving Buddhist temples, the Kyichu Lhakhang in Paro and the Jambay Lhakhang in Bumthang.

The first reports of people of Nepalese origin in Bhutan was during 8th century when Padmashambhawa visited Bhutan with Nepali sculptures, architectural engineers and many workers brought by Bhrikuti Devi, the Queen of Emperor Songs-ten Gampo. Also during the rule of King Ram Saha around 1620 and 1624 when Shabdrung Ngawang Namgyal commissioned a few Newar craftsmen from the Kathmandu valley in Nepal to make a silver stupa to contain the ashes of his father Tempa Nima. Since then, people of Nepalese origin started to settle in uninhabited areas of southern Bhutan. The south soon became the country's main supplier of food. Bhutanese of Nepalese origin, Lhotshampas, were flourishing along with the economy of Bhutan. By 1930, according to British colonial officials, much of the south was under cultivation by a population of Nepali origin.

Settlement in Bhutan of a large number of people from Nepal happened in the early 20th century. This settlement was encouraged by the Bhutan House in Kalimpong for the purpose of collecting taxes for the government. In the 1930s, the Bhutan House settled 5,000 families of Nepali workers in Tsirang alone. In the 1940s, the British Political Officer Sir Basil Gould was quoted as saying that when he warned Sir Raja Sonam Topgay Dorji of Bhutan House of the potential danger of allowing so many ethnic Nepalese to settle in southern Bhutan, he replied that "since they were not registered subjects they could be evicted whenever the need arose." Furthermore, Lhotshampa were forbidden from settling north of the subtropical foothills.

Expatriate Nepalese who resettled in West Bengal and Assam after leaving Bhutan formed the Bhutan State Congress in 1952 to represent the interests of other expatriates in India as well as the communities they had left behind. An effort to expand their operations into Bhutan with a satyagraha (non-violent resistance) movement in 1954 failed in the face of the mobilization of Bhutan's militia and a lack of enthusiasm among those Nepalese in Bhutan, who did not want to risk their already tenuous status. The Bhutanese government further diffused the Bhutan State Congress movement by granting concessions to the minority and allowing Nepalese representation in the National Assembly. The Bhutan State Congress continued to operate in exile until its decline and gradual disappearance in the early 1960s. The leaders in exile were pardoned in 1969 and permitted to return.

=== Bhutan's Citizenship Act of 1958 ===
Toward the end of the reign of the second King Jigme Wangchuck in the 1950s, the numbers of new immigrants had swelled causing tension between the King and the Dorji family in the Bhutan House. Amnesty was given through the Citizenship Act of 1958 for all those who could prove their presence in Bhutan for at least 10 years prior to 1958. On the other hand, the government also banned further immigration in 1958.

From 1961 onward however, with Indian support, the government began planned developmental activities consisting of significant infrastructure development works. Uncomfortable with India's desire to bring in workers in large numbers from India, the government initially tried to prove its own capacity by insisting that the planned Thimphu-Phuntsholing highway be done with its own workforce. The government also attempted to rein in immigration. While the project was a success, completing the 182-kilometer highway in just two years, the import of workers from India was inevitable. With most Bhutanese self-employed as farmers, Bhutan lacked a ready supply of workers willing to take up the major infrastructure projects. This led eventually to the large-scale immigration of skilled and unskilled construction workers from India. These people were mostly of Nepali origin and settled in the south, as required, among legal and illegal residents alike. With the pressures of the developmental activities, this trend remained unchecked or inadequately checked for many years. Immigration check posts and immigration offices were in fact established for the first time only after 1990.

=== Bhutan's Citizenship Act of 1985 ===
By the 1980s, the government had become acutely conscious not just of widespread illegal immigration of people of Nepali origin into Bhutan, but also of the total lack of integration even of long-term immigrants into the political and cultural mainstream of the country. Most Lhotshampa remained culturally Nepalese. For its part, the government had largely ignored illegal settlement, but had encouraged intermarriage with cash payments as a means of assimilation. However, this was met with negligible success as far as actual assimilation. There was also a perception of a Greater Nepal movement emerging from the Nepali-dominated areas in Nepal, Darjeeling, Kalimpong and West Bengal which the Bhutanese feared as Nepali chauvinism.

Perceiving this growing dichotomy as a threat to national unity, the government promulgated directives in the 1980s that sought to preserve Bhutan's cultural identity as well as to formally embrace the citizens of other ethnic groups in a "One Nation, One People" policy. The government implied that the "culture" to be preserved would be that of the various northern Bhutanese groups. To reinforce this movement, the government forced the use of the Driglam Namzha, the Bhutanese national dress and etiquette code. This policy required citizens to wear the attire of the northern Bhutanese in public places under penalty of fines, and reinforced the status of Dzongkha as the national language. Nepali was discontinued as a subject in the schools, thus bringing it at par with the status of the other languages of Bhutan, none of which are taught. Such policies were criticized at first by human rights groups as well as Bhutan's Nepalese economic migrant community, who perceived the policy to be directed against them. The government, for its part, perceived that free Nepali-language education had encouraged illegal immigration into southern Bhutan.

The Citizenship Act of 1985 clarified and attempted to enforce the Citizenship Act of 1958 to control the flood of illegal immigration. In 1980, the government conducted its first real census exercise. The basis for census citizenship classifications was the 1958 "cut off" year, the year that the Nepali population had first received Bhutanese citizenship. Those individuals who could not provide proof of residency prior to 1958 were adjudged to be illegal immigrants.

=== Bhutan's first census (1988) ===
The issue was brought to the fore when the government of Bhutan discovered in its first census the magnitude of the Lhotsampa population. Lhotsampa of Nepali descent who had been living in southern Bhutan since the late nineteenth and early twentieth centuries were induced to leave Bhutan after the country carried out its first census in 1988. The government, however, failed to properly train the census officials and this led to some tension among the public. Placement in the census categories which ranged from "Genuine Bhutanese" to "Non-nationals: Migrants and Illegal Settlers" was often arbitrary, and could be arbitrarily changed. In some cases members of the same family have been, and still are, placed in different categories; some admittedly genuine Bhutanese have been forced to flee with family members the government found to be illegal immigrants. Other Lhotshampa who considered their own citizenship secure were prevented by government officials from obtaining proper documentation, losing their property.

The government also attempted to enforce the Bhutanese driglam namzha dress and language code at the same time, to have the Lhotshampa population assimilate into Ngalop society. The government explained its cultural identity programs as a defense against the first political problems since the Wangchuck Dynasty was established in 1907 and the greatest threat to the nation's survival since the seventeenth century. In an effort to resolve the interethnic strife, the Druk Gyalpo made frequent visits to the troubled southern districts, and he ordered the release of hundreds of arrested "antinationals". He also expressed the fear that the large influx of Nepalese might lead to their demand for a separate state in the next ten to twenty years, in much the same way as happened in the once-independent monarchy of Sikkim in the 1970s.

However, these measures combined to alienate even bona fide citizens of Nepali descent. Some ethnic Nepalese began protesting perceived discrimination, demanding exemption from the government decrees aimed at enhancing Bhutanese national identity. The reaction to the royal decrees in Nepalese majority communities surfaced as ethnic strife directed against non-Lhotshampa. Reactions also took form as protest movements in Nepal and India among Nepalese who had left Bhutan. The Druk Gyalpo was accused of "cultural suppression," and his government was charged by antigovernment leaders with human rights violations, including the torture of prisoners; arbitrary arrest and detention; denial of due process; and restrictions of freedoms of speech and press, peaceful organization and assembly, and workers' rights. Antigovernment protest marches involved more than 20,000 participants, including some from a movement that had succeeded in coercing India into accepting local autonomy for ethnic Nepalese in West Bengal, who crossed the border from West Bengal and Assam into six districts across Bhutan. As the census exercise came to an end, the southern border of Bhutan became a hotbed of militancy for several years.

Supporting the anti-government activities were expatriate Nepalese political groups and supporters in Nepal and India. Between 2,000 and 12,000 Nepalese were reported to have fled Bhutan in the late 1980s, and according to a 1991 report, even high-level Bhutanese government officials of Nepalese origin had resigned their positions and moved to Nepal. Some 5 million Nepalese were living in settlements in India along the Bhutan border in 1990. Nepalese were not necessarily welcome in India, where ethnic strife conspired to push them back through the largely unguarded Bhutanese frontier. The Bhutan Peoples' Party operated among the large Nepalese community in northern India. A second group, the Bhutan People's Forum for Human Rights (a counterpart of the Nepal People's Forum for Human Rights), was established in 1998 in Nepal by Tek Nath Rizal, a Lhotshampa and former trusted official of the Royal Advisory Council who acted as a chief liaison between the government and the Lhotshampa in the south, as well as a former member of the National Assembly of Bhutan. The Bhutan Students Union and the Bhutan Aid Group-Nepal also were involved in political activism.

In November 1989, Tek Nath Rizal was allegedly abducted in eastern Nepal by Bhutanese police and returned to Thimphu, where he was imprisoned on charges of conspiracy and treason. He was also accused of instigating the racial riots in southern Bhutan. Rizal was sentenced to life imprisonment in 1993.

=== Interethnic conflict (1990s) ===
Interethnic conflict generally escalated during the 1990s. In February 1990, antigovernment activists detonated a remote-control bomb on a bridge near Phuntsholing and set fire to a seven-vehicle convoy.

In September 1990, clashes occurred with the Royal Bhutan Army, which was ordered not to fire on protesters. The men and women marchers were organized by S.K. Neupane and other members of the illegal Bhutan Peoples' Party, which reportedly urged the marchers to demand democracy and human rights for all Bhutanese citizens. Some villagers willingly joined the protests; others did so under duress. The government branded the party, reportedly established by anti-monarchists and backed by the Nepali Congress Party and the Communist Party of Nepal (Unified Marxist-Leninist), as a terrorist organization. The party allegedly led its members – said to be armed with rifles, muzzle-loading guns, knives, and homemade grenades – in raids on villages in southern Bhutan, disrobing people wearing traditional Bhutanese garb; extorting money; and robbing, kidnapping, and killing people. Reportedly, there were hundreds of casualties, although the government admitted to only two deaths among security forces. Other sources indicated that more than 300 persons were killed, 500 wounded, and 2,000 arrested in clashes with security forces. Along with the above-mentioned violence, vehicle hijackings, kidnappings, extortions, ambushes, and bombings took place, schools were closed (some were destroyed), and post offices, police, health, forest, customs, and agricultural posts were destroyed. For their part, security forces were charged by the Bhutan Peoples' Party, in protests made to Amnesty International and the International Human Rights Commission, with murder and rape and carrying out a "reign of terror". In support of the expatriate Nepalese, the general secretary of the Nepali Congress Party, the ruling party in Nepal, called on the King of Bhutan to establish a multiparty democracy. Some of the organizers of the marches were arrested and detained. The Bhutanese government admitted only to the arrest of 42 people involved in "anti-national" activities in late 1989, plus 3 additional individuals who had been extradited from Nepal. All but 6 were reportedly later released; those remaining in jail were charged with treason. By September 1990, more than 300 additional prisoners held in the south were released following the Druk Gyalpo's tour of southern districts.

In the face of government resistance to demands that would institutionalize separate identities within the nation, protesters in the south insisted that the Bhutan Peoples' Party flag be flown in front of administrative headquarters and that party members be allowed to carry the kukri, a traditional Nepalese curved knife, at all times. They also called for the right not to wear the Bhutanese national dress, and insisted that schools and government offices stay closed until their demands were met. The unmet demands were accompanied by additional violence and deaths in October 1990. At the same time, India pledged "all possible assistance that the royal government might seek in dealing with this problem" and assured that it would protect the frontier against groups seeking illegal entry to Bhutan.

By early 1991, the press in Nepal was referring to insurgents in southern Bhutan as "freedom fighters". The Bhutan Peoples' Party claimed that more than 4,000 advocates of democracy had been arrested by the Royal Bhutan Army. Charges were made that some of those arrested had been murdered outside Bhutanese police stations and that some 4,200 persons had been deported.

To deter and regulate Nepalese migration into Bhutan from India, the Druk Gyalpo ordered more regular censuses, improved border checks, and better government administration in the southern districts. The more immediate action of forming citizens' militias took place in October 1990 as a backlash to the demonstrations. Internal travel regulations were made more strict with the issue of new multipurpose identification cards by the Ministry of Home Affairs in January 1990. By the end of 1990, the government admitted the serious effects of the anti-government violence. It was announced that foreign- exchange earnings had dropped and that the GDP had decreased significantly because of terrorist activities.

In 1992 interethnic conflict again flared, prompting a peak in Lhotshampa departures, totaling over 100,000 by 1996. Many Lhotshampa claim to have been forcibly evicted by the military, who forced them to sign "Voluntary Migration Form" documents stating they had left willingly.

In 1998, Tek Nath Rizal was granted a royal pardon and left for Nepal to form the "People's Forum for Human Rights".

== Refugee camps in Nepal ==
During the 1990s several thousand Lhotshampa settled in the refugee camps that were set up by the UNHCR in Nepal. The UNHCR recognized most of the arrivals between 1990 and 1993 on a prima facie basis. By 1996, the camp populations had exploded to 100,000 and peaked at more than 107,000 persons.

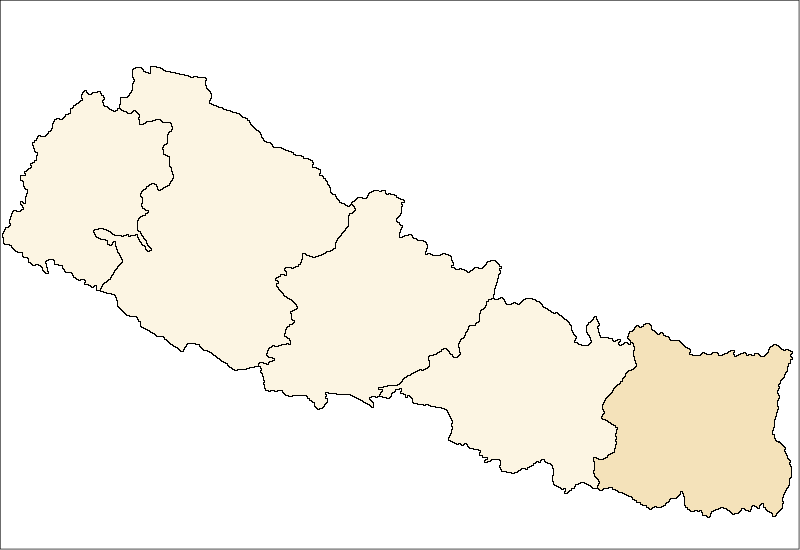
Bhutanese refugee camps in Eastern Nepal: Timai, Goldhap, Khudunabari, Sanischare, Beldangi 1 & 2.

The government of Nepal and the UNHCR have managed the below seven refugee camps since the arrival of the Bhutanese refugees in the 1990s:

Populations of concern to UNHCR in refugee camps between 2006 and 2016
Camp	2016	2015	2014	2013	2012	2011	2010	2009	2008	2007	2006
Timai	–	–	–	–	–	–	7,058	8,553	9,935	10,421	10,413
Sanischare	2,265	3,367	4,675	6,599	9,212	10,173	13,649	16,745	20,128	21,386	21,285
Beldangi 1 & 2	9,497	13,970	18,574	24,377	31,976	33,855	36,761	42,122	50,350	52,967	52,997
Goldhap	–	–	–	–	–	–	4,764	6,356	8,315	9,694	9,602
Khudunabari	–	–	–	–	–	9,032	11,067	12,054	13,254	13,226	13,506

=== Living conditions ===
Camp conditions were initially rife with malnutrition and disease including measles, scurvy, tuberculosis, malaria, cholera, and beriberi, although camp conditions improved markedly between 1995 and 2005. Education was among the best services provided within the camps, generally better than in the surrounding countryside of Nepal. Camps, however, remained significantly overpopulated through 2006. Malnourishment, due to age-based food rationing, violence against women and children, as well as marginalization and radicalization remained serious issues. Bhutanese refugees in Nepal live under conditions of restricted or controlled movement, restricted ability to work, and limited access to the local justice system. The Danish humanitarian organization, Global Medical Aid has aided Bhutanese refugees in Nepal.

Since 2009 the population of the camps shrunk as can be seen in the table above. Due to this reduction the Goldhap and Timai camps have been merged with the Beldangi II camp. The offices are preparing to close or merge other camps and predicted to complete the refugee resettlement operation within 10 years. By 2016, only the Beldangi and Sanischare camps remained, with a combined total of 11,762 residents. However, there are around 10,000 refugees left in the camps, who are either not eligible or do not want to be resettled. Remaining are mainly elderly people who have lost their support network – through resettlement – and are affected by increasing rates of depression, substance misuse and suicide.

=== Voluntary return ===
In 2000, after years of discussion, Bhutan and Nepal reached an agreement about the voluntary return of certain Bhutanese refugees living in Nepalese camps. However, points of contention included that some camp inhabitants have never been citizens, or some not even residents, of Bhutan before attaining refugee status. Furthermore, the Bhutanese government regarded many political groups among the Nepalese Lhotshampa community, such as the Bhutan Peoples' Party (BPP) and Bhutan National Democratic Party (BNDP), as terrorist or anti-national groups. Further complicating repatriation, the land and other property formerly held by Lhotshampa refugees have been repopulated and taken over by Ngalop settlers – including government and military members – under government encouragement.

In March 2001, the first verification of Bhutanese refugees eligible for repatriation commenced in Nepalese refugee camps. Actual repatriation was then estimated to occur within one year. However, progress stalled for over a decade. In 2003, a Bhutanese verification team was attacked and injured in Jhapa, resulting in further delay. As of 2011, over 200 refugees in the Khudunabari refugee camp alone had been certified. However, no Bhutanese refugees had been repatriated. In April 2011, Bhutan and Nepal again opened talks on repatriation, however the UNHCR remains committed to third country resettlement in light of Bhutan's refusal to guarantee full citizenship and other human rights for returnees. As of July 2011, the governments of Bhutan and Nepal had held at least 15 rounds of bilateral talks with no practical solution reached; although Bhutanese state media echoed Bhutan's insistence on continued talks with Nepal, it has signaled its preference for third country resettlement. Nepal, for its part, has not accepted the refugees into its own population.

The United States Department of State identified leaders within refugee camps intent on repatriation as hampering some resettlement efforts with disinformation and intimidation, despite generally poor prospects for repatriation.

=== Third country resettlement ===
For many years the government of Nepal did not allow resettlement for Bhutanese refugees. This only changed in the second half of the 2000s after lengthy negotiations. Bhutanese refugees were an attractive group for receiving countries as they were perceived as posing much less of a security risk.

The UNHCR and different partners that formed the "Core Group on Bhutanese Refugees in Nepal" announced in 2007 to resettle the majority of the 108,000 registered Bhutanese refugees. The U.S. offered to take 60,000 and began receiving them in 2008. Australia, Canada, Norway, the Netherlands and Denmark offered to resettle 10,000 each and New Zealand offered to resettle 600 refugees over a period of five years starting in 2008. By January 2009, more than 8,000 and by November 2010, more than 40,000 Bhutanese refugees were resettled in various countries. Canada offered to accept additional 6,500 Bhutanese refugees by the end of 2014. Norway has already resettled 200 Bhutanese refugees and Canada has agreed to accept up to 5000 through to 2012.

In November 2015 it was announced that 100,000 refugees have been resettled abroad (85 percent of them to the USA) and in February 2017 the number rose to a total of 108,513. By 2019 January around 112,800 have been resettled abroad. These include British Bhutanese people, who have settled in the United Kingdom.

According to Raj Khadka resettlement has provided the opportunity of starting a new life to these refugees, but the challenges that they are facing in the labour market are a big hurdle in establishing themselves in the new countries that are quite different from their own.

Third country resettlement of Bhutanese refugees by receiving country
Country	January 2011	April 2013	February 2017
Australia	2,186	4,190	6,204
Canada	2,404	5,376	6,773
Denmark	326	746	875
Netherlands	229	326	329
New Zealand	505	747	1,075
Norway	373	546	570
United Kingdom	111	317	358
United States	34,969	66,134	92,323

== Refoulement by the United States ==
During the second Trump administration, groups of Nepali-speaking Bhutanese refugees who had been resettled in the United States faced deportation due to prior involvement in largely minor legal issues. Upon deportation, Bhutan briefly received them but quickly expelled the refugees to the Indian border, mirroring actions which led to the original refugee crisis. The deportees later entered Nepal illegally, to resume life in the refugee camps, and some of these individuals were subsequently detained by Nepalese authorities.

Refoulement by the United States had effectively made the deportees stateless once again. A habeas corpus petition filed in Nepal's Supreme Court halted immediate deportation from Nepal of the arrivals, however human rights advocates continued to argue that the actions of all governments involved are in violation of international refugee law.

Nepal’s Department of Immigration, after a 60-day investigation, has ordered the deportation of the individuals to Bhutan and imposed a fine of 5,000 rupees. Citing a provision that allows deportation of those who have entered the country on a visa, the department has asked them to submit travel documents or passports for the deportation process. However, rights activists have also criticized this decision of Nepal.

== See also ==
- Ethnic cleansing in Bhutan
- Immigration to Bhutan
- Demographics of Bhutan
- Politics of Bhutan
- Tek Nath Rizal
- Nepalese immigration in Bhutan
