= Gasorwe Refugee Camp =

Refugee camp in Burundi

Coordinates: 2°52′56″S 30°12′25″E

Gasorwe refugee camp is a refugee camp located in Gasorwe commune of Muyinga province in Burundi.

== Location ==
Gasorwe refugee camp is located in Kinama colline, Gasorwe commune in Muyinga province in the North-east Burundi.

== History ==
Gasorwe refugee camp was established on 27 May 2002. It occupies 250,000m^{2}. The camp is divided into 30 quartiers with 1,312 houses. Gasorwe refugee camp is administered by the government of Burundi and United Nations High Commissioner for Refugees who are the main operating partner.

On 13 May 2004, 724 Congolese refugees were transferred to Gasorwe camp from Cishemeye transit center. The process of transferring refugees started in February 2004. A total of eight convoys of 4,465 refugees were transferred to the camp, joining the 4,000 other refugees who were residing in the camp prior.

== Demography ==
As of June 2013, Gasorwe refugee camp was hosting 11,000 refugees compared to the 5,667 refugees reported in 2005. The camp is a home to nine ethnic groups namely; Bakusu, Barega, Bashi, Bafurero, Babembe, Banyamulenge, Bahavu, Baganda and pygmy.

As of 2005, they were 461 orphans, 21 unaccompanied minors, 70 elderly people, 410 single parent households and 101 people with physical or mental handicap.

== Services ==
As of 2005, there are various services provided by the partner organization.

Partner organizations	Services provided
African Humanitarian Action	camp management and service delivery like health and nutrition, distribution of food and non-food items, education, water and sanitation, and community services.
Austrian Relief Program	Construction of new houses and rehabilitation of certain community structures.
The Association Burundaise pour le Bien Etre Familial (ABUBEF)	Formerly provided HIV/AIDS and reproductive health awareness training in the camp.

== External source ==
WFP/UNHCR REPORT OF THE JOINT ASSESSMENT MISSION OF THE CONGOLESE REFUGEES IN BURUNDI 27-30 JUNE 2005
