= Africa Humanitarian Action =

International non-governmental organization

fdisAfrica Humanitarian Action (AHA) is a non-governmental organization that provides relief services to countries in Africa. It was founded by Dr. David Zawde in 1994 in response to the Rwandan genocide.

In 1994, the Rwandan genocide occurred. Hundreds of thousands of people were killed in Rwanda, Africa. At this time, Dr. Dawit Zawde, a medical doctor in Ethiopia, noticed the lack of an African response and organized a medical team to respond out of Kigali. Formally launched in Addis Ababa, within months of its opening, AHA sent two teams of young health and relief professionals during the Rwandan crisis.These professionals hailed from seven African countries—Benin, Cameroon, Ethiopia, Guinea, Malawi, Rwanda, and Senegal, becoming the first African-only Non-government organization (NGO) operating in Rwanda. The AHA teams targeted returnee populations and the internally displaced as they were deployed at two health centers, one in the northwest region at Tare in the Kigali Prefecture and a second at Kabarondo in Kibungo Prefecture in the southeast. They provided unprecedented 24-hour emergency health services and regular out and in-patient care. As the operation in Rwanda grew, AHA decided to extend their presence to other countries in Africa. By the end of 1995, AHA had moved to Uganda, Angola and began operations in Ethiopia. By the end of 1999, the framework that was implemented in Eastern and Central Africa by AHA had now been transferred to offices in Western Africa. it currently operate in 20 African countries

== History ==
=== 1995–1999 ===
AHA in 1995, published their objectives, in order to establish their focus with humanitarian efforts, which are listed below:

- Provide humanitarian relief and sustained development support to distressed communities in Africa
- Equip displaced people and refugees with the basic skills necessary to deal with disaster situations
- Develop indigenous capabilities in disaster prevention, preparedness, relief management and recovery
- Create and assist independent, non-profit, non-sectarian, and non-governmental organizations in Africa that embrace their own ideals and objectives
- Research, develop, and disseminate information and policies involving governments, institutions, and local communities aimed at reducing the scope and scale of conflict as well as their prevention and resolution
- Set up a database of readily available African professional resources for relief and sustainable development initiatives.

After this was published, AHA focus turned to Uganda and Angola. In Uganda, AHA built from scratch the infrastructures required to provide health and related services in parts of the country where such facilities were not available. In Angola, AHA became part of a massive international effort to rebuild a nation largely reduced to ashes and rubble. Growth forecast for Africa during the 1990s fell short of expectations. In 1994, 35 million people remained at risk from famine; and 20 million others were displaced by conflict and natural disasters while millions more were succumbing to treatable diseases.

In Rwanda, AHA expanded from just providing health services to on-the-job training for Rwandan health personnel. As the emotional and psychological repercussions of the crisis started to take a hold of the post-genocide Rwandan population, AHA expanded its services to include psychological issues. AHA found that women and children were the major victims of the emotional and psychological changes and along with the UN Fund for Women / Africa Women in Crisis Programme, they began care and counseling services. In 1996, the Rwandan Ministry of Health and the UN High Commissioner for Refugees (UNHCR) invited AHA to play a bigger role in the health sector. AHA was then given management responsibility for the health district of Rwinkwavu in Kibungo Prefecture in the east and Mugonero health district.

In 1997, AHA expanded the process of community-based development in Rwanda, which helped AHA improve the health of about 60,000 people. AHA also made it an important project to improve the physical condition of health facilities and restore essential services for refugees/returnees, internally displaced persons (IDPs), and host communities living in the three districts. AHA has fostered local participation in the actual restoration work of the health units. AHA served about 115,000 patients and started different programs that included maternal and child health treatment, family planning, vaccinations and treatment of acute and chronic illnesses.

AHA also started building houses for 360 families and handed over the completed houses to beneficiaries in Musasa, Rushashi, and Tare communes. At the end of the decade, UNHCR and AHA worked on a project in the northwest of the country; however this was halted due to financial constraints. AHA continued to providehealth care services to returnees and the local population as the rest of the international NGO community retreated due to security concerns and deteriorating conditions.

In 1995, AHA entered Uganda providing services to refugee settlers in Mongula, East Moyo District, which borders Sudan. These early AHA refugees all hailed from Sudan, following the escalation of fighting between the Sudanese government forces and its southern opponents. AHA provided immunization services, reproductive health care, preventive activities, environmental hygiene, and general health education. At the end of the year, AHA also started training a selected group of refugees in the health and sanitation sectors. In 1996, however, AHA evacuated its international and senior staff from Adjumani in East Moyo to the Ugandan capital, Kampala, due to the deteriorating conditions on the ground. AHA also began to manage two health posts previously under the management of Medecins Sans Frontiers – Swiss at Kolididi and Mirieyi. Insurgents also attacked and abducted about 20 refugees and local people including AHA's medical assistant during 1997. By 1999, due to a calming of the chaos, health services were extended to 71,000 refugees and 36,000 nationals living in Adjumani District through 22 health units under AHA management.

Angola, entered by AHA in 1995, was part of a massive international effort that resembled the intervention in Rwanda and by the end of the year, Cazombo Municipal Hospital and three other rural hospitals as well as a health post in Kafaria were receiving support from AHA. Cazombo Hospital covered about 2/3s of the entire country and by 1996; there was a notable fall in the morbidity pattern. The mortality rate stood at 2.3% at the end of 1996, from a high of nearly 5%. Health care in Angola was defined by producing preventive/curative health care, general education/information, and sanitation, while hospitals were being equipped with laboratory and surgical equipment. Drug distribution proved harder than it was thought to be. However, by the end of 1997, Cazombo had their own distribution points of clean potable water, giving the residents easy access to water for the first time in decades. Cazombo represented great progress until the security situation greatly deteriorated to a point where it was no longer possible for AHA to soldier on. In addition, a budget decrease limited the operations and regular World Food Programme (WFP) flights to provincial towns had to be suspended in 1998. All of these problems forced AHA to be relocated to nearby Zambia.

In 1997, AHA planned to enter more countries to provide health care and other services. Burundi, Ethiopia, and Liberia had programs start in 1997, and Sierra Leone had operations but Liberia hosted the staff. AHA was the first medical oriented NGO to provide medical assistance in Burundi as they designed a project for reinforcing health care services in Burundi, aiming to cover the health needs of the population of the province and more than 40,000 displaced/dispersed and regrouped people in 17 camps. In Ethiopia, AHA focused on family planning and welfare services in Shashemene in the Oromia Regional State. The projects undertaken in Ethiopia were worked on jointly with indigenous NGOs such as LEM, the Environment, and Development Society of Ethiopia, and other national and international NGOs already established in both areas. The project in Liberia started as a trial project with the government as the project focused on both Liberia and Sierra Leone. By the end of 1999, AHA planned to extend its services to West Africa after the then-OAU approved funds amounting to US$100,000 as a first installment of a two-project cost, estimated at over US$1.5 million in total.

=== 2000–2005 ===
In the year 2000, AHA was actively working in six countries with emergency relief, refugee, and health programmes. The biggest problem AHA faced was the lack of funding for the institutional structures that would make all of its goals a reality. In order to maintain its activities, AHA needed US$350,000.

An estimated three million people were displaced in Angola at the onset of the millennium. At UNHCR's request, AHA took on projects for IDPs in three provinces, Maquela do Zombo in Uige and M’Vanza Congo in the Democratic Republic of the Congo – from July to December. AHA worked in three camps for the displaced, Malanje, Moxico and Mussenge, and a camp for Katangese refugees. AHA provided the refugees and IDPs with water and sanitation, income generation, housing construction and the building of community centers. AHA became the implementing agency for the water, sanitation, health, and community mobilization components of a UNHCR project. In partnership with OXFAM, it undertook the installation of six water points.

In 2000, AHA continued a two-year programme funded by Pathfinder International to develop family planning, reproductive health services, and STI/HIV/AIDS prevention in two Ethiopian districts. AHA took interest in Shashemene because it has one of the country's main highways passing through it, indirectly contributing to the commercial sex trade in that region. The second selected was Gofa Zuria, 525 km from Addis Ababa, because of minimal infrastructure, low socio-economic development and poor health status.

AHA provided health, nutrition, sanitation, and water services to Congolese and Burundian refugees in Rwanda throughout the year supplying staff and technical support to the surgical unit of Kibuye Hospital. The program maintained a health centre for 13,232 Congolese refugees in Kiziba camp. In 2000 alone, the health care center in Kiziba refugee camp gave 24,152 consultations and hospitalized 630 people.

In Uganda, AHA provides integrated health services to refugees and nationals living in Adjumani district through 24 health units and when the year began AHA targeted 71,392 refugees and 34,000 Ugandans. By the year's end, births, deaths, and new refugee arrivals had brought refugee numbers to 73,590. Ante-natal care (ANC), pre- and post-natal care, family planning, adolescent sexuality and monitoring of GBV activities were conducted throughout this period via both static and outreach service delivery points. Out of 1,942 deliveries, 87% were assisted by health units or by traditional birth attendants (TBA).

With inputs from OAU, AHA provided short-term assistance to Sierra Leonean refugees relocated in Sinje, funneling aid through Southwestern Liberia with UNHCR's help. AHA provided for 2,000 families and agricultural tools, seedlings and fertilizers for 460 farming groups. AHA sought funding for two health projects in support of Sierra Leonean refugees in Maryland and in Upper Lofta counties.

AHA, acting as the implementing partner of the UNHCR, has provided emergency health, nutrition and sanitation services to refugees in the Mayukwayukwa settlement area in Zambia since January 2000. The program began in response to the serious conditions created by the influx of refugees from Angola, Burundi, the Democratic Republic of the Congo, and Rwanda, with the great majority of the refugees being Angolans, the camp catered to 18,000 refugees by the end of the year. In 2001, AHA continued its partnership with the UNHCR and related support programmes for refugees in Angola, Liberia, Namibia, Ethiopia, Rwanda, Uganda, and Zambia.

The humanitarian situation in Angola did not improve in 2001. While the government recaptured many areas, this did not bring security or free movement of people and goods. Humanitarian organizations, including AHA, had to continue providing emergency support in order to avert a catastrophic situation in the crisis area. AHA carried out community education programmes in partnership with UNHCR, UNICEF, WFP, the British Embassy, and Save the Children UK. The programmes included HIV/AIDS awareness, microcredit education, preschool activities, and assistance with displaced women. AHA worked in the Viana (refugee camp) with IDPs from the provinces of Malange, Moxico and Kwanza. Micro credit projects with aims at improving the livelihood of displaced families, particularly those headed by women, by providing access to credit for small-scale trading were undertaken. Over 140 people have received loans in 2001.

The Family planning /Reproductive Health and HIV/AIDS/STDs prevention project in Ethiopia was in 30 rural and semi-urban locations of Gofa and Shashamene woredas with 260,000 target beneficiaries in 164 peasant associations. In 2001, more community based reproductive health (CBRH) project sites were initiated in Boloso Sore and Sodo Zuria districts, and over 164 kebeles of the four districts received CBRH cervices in place. Services to beneficiary communities gradually improved in quality and quantity, as a significant change in attitudes was registered. As a result, the demand for more contraceptives and protective know-how increased.

Initially, the Namibian Ministry of health and Social Services provided curative health services at the Osire refugee camp and the Namibia Red Cross Society was responsible for the preventive health care in Namibia, as an implementing partner of the UNHCR. In May 2001, the management of curative health care services was transferred to AHA. Prior to assuming responsibilities, AHA analyzed the situation in the Osire camp and made a member of proposals for improvements, later accepted by the Namibia Government and UNHCR. AHA provided treatment to over 23,000 refugees in the Osire refugee camp, as Angolan refugees accounted for over 95% of the base population.

Since 1995, AHA, on behalf of the Government of Uganda and the UNHCR, has implemented health services to both the refugee community and the national population in the Adjumani district of Uganda. AHA participated in the development of the health services as operations has gradually grown to a network of 23 permanent health units, which are equipped with VHF radios. In 2001, AHA has assisted more than 57,700 refugees and 40,000 nationals, with 1,753 births were registered and 291 deaths.

In Zambia, AHA assumed responsibility for the Nyangweso refugee camp. AHA operates through a community-based referral system and early identification of cases by community health workers, trained traditional birth attendants, and outreach primary health staff and health related education.

In 2002, AHA hosted its Second Assembly of International Trustees. New trustees were introduced and Dr. Salim Ahmed Salim, a prominent African personality, was elected as AHA's Chairman. Sheik Mohammed Hussein Al Amoudi, a well known entrepreneur was named Co-chair.

Among the Assembly's resolutions, the decision endorsing the formation of AHA country associations stands out as particularly timely. The assembly decided to diversify AHA's activities more aggressively, to engage in HIV/AIDS, TB, and malaria.

Angola underwent massive change during 2002. First a ceasefire and then a peace agreement were finally negotiated between the warring factions. The assembly of UNITA soldiers and families presented emergency problems, as there was severe malnourishment between both adult and child population, however, due to the intervention of the Government, UN and NGOs, the situation was abated.

In Ethiopia, AHA started the second phase of its integrated family planning, reproductive health, and HIV/AIDS prevention programme, expanding its coverage in the southern part of the country from two to seven woredas.

AHA's activities in Zambia focused on providing health nutrition, sanitation activities in Nangweshi and Mayukwayukwa refugee camps. The project, which is responsible for over 22,000 refugees in each camp and about 5000 local residents in the surrounding area, was supported by a wide variety of local and international organizations – UNHCR, ECHO, UNICEF, WFP, the Italian government, and our local partners at the ministry of health, and in the field.

In 2003, AHA continued its advocacy and response services (health and community, water and sanitation, HIV/AIDS and primary education) to 43,500 refugees, IDPs and returnees in Angola, 125,000 in Burundi, 635,000 in Ethiopia, 17,500 in Namibia, 16,000 in Rwanda, 430,000 in Uganda and 65,000 in Zambia. AHA was also able to increase its corporate staff resources and enhance the perception of the organization.

AHA responded to the 2003 Boumerdès earthquake by providing material assistance to the victims and by establishing a Liaison Office for North Africa. AHA also opened a Liaison office in East Africa in Nairobi, Kenya, which undertook assessment missions to Southern Sudan and Somalia. AHA made a presentation at the International Symposium on Refugees in Africa, organized by the Japanese Government in Tokyo in June 2003.

AHA had earned widespread recognition as an experienced and well-functioning organization, which permitted it to go into Darfur, Sudan, swiftly in response once mote to violence, displacement and desperate need.

AHA, in 2004, brought together its partners from around the world with an African-set agenda. The event attracted representatives of hundreds of leading aid agencies and frontline NGOs. In collaboration with the AU, AHA organized the International Symposium on "Building the Capacity and Resources of African Non Governmental Organizations" in Addis Ababa. Building on the accomplishments of the Symposium, AHA helped form the African Centre for Humanitarian Action (ACHA). ACHA and other initiatives were viewed to not only increase the resources and capacity of African NGOs but also raise their international standing. In 2004, AHA continued its health and social programmes for refugees and returnees in Angola, Burundi, Congo (DR), the Republic of Guinea, Liberia, Namibia, and Ethiopia. In September, AHA launched an emergency intervention in Darfur and started planning for support to South Sudan in 2005.

AHA also made a concerted effort to reach out to the corporate sector with innovative and progressive methods, already providing education, health, and social services to many of Africa's citizens.

Angola continued to recover in 2005 from its most recent turmoil. There were still was an estimated 91,000 people who remained displaced in Angola in 2005. 11,322 returnees and 186,710 patients benefited from AHA programs including but not limited to Capacity Building, Training of TBAs and community health workers, mine awareness, medical services and water and sanitation. As of November 2005, 200,000 Burundi refugees had been repatriated. According to the UNHCR, in 2005, 60,288 Burundian refugees were still living in DR Congo and 2,000 in Rwanda. The total number of beneficiaries in 2005 IDPS and refugees respectively was 118,000 and 486,000.

The war with Ethiopia and Eritrea resulted in hundreds of thousands of displaced people. Ethnic clashes had left nearly 100,000 Ethiopians internally displaced. The total number of refugees and IDPs was 65,293 and 250,000 respectively.

An estimated 38,500 refugees had gone through the UNHCR-led voluntary repatriation program started in 2004. As of 2005, 210,000 Liberian IDPs had been assisted to return home. The total number of refugees and IDPs was 23,000 and 464,000 respectively.

More than four years after the issue of internal displacement was taken off the agenda in Rwanda, conditions in the villages inhabited by the resettled IDPs call for renewed attention. An organized repatriation process had begun, even though; there is still intimidation of those seeking to return by leaders trying to keep their resistance intact. The total number of refugees and IDPs was 145,704 and 4,158 respectively.

2,610,000 people had been affected by the violence in Darfur and some estimates put the death toll as high as 300,000 caused by the conflict between the government forces and, the SLA, JEM and Janjaweed military action, exposure, starvation and disease. An estimated six million Sudanese citizens had been forced to leave their home as a direct or indirect result of fighting between government troops and allied militias and various insurgent groups. The total number of refugees and IDPs was 693,267 and 5,300,000 respectively. The various programmes AHA participated in were food distribution and medical services.

=== 2006–2010 ===
In a time where Angola was slowly recovering from almost three decades of armed conflict that displaced more than four million people, AHA's programmes in Angola actively worked on providing healthcare. During 2006, AHA attended to more than 50,000 people at its health post/centers and delivered health education to more than 10,000 people, during which time AHA recorded a minimal mortality rate, well within WHO accepted standards, thus providing timely and effective protection and assistance to the Angolan returnees and local communities.

In addition to efforts on health, one of the many programmes implemented by AHA in the same year was on building the strengths and capacities with individuals, communities, and local organization. In 2006, around 1,000 people were trained as Community Based Reproductive Health Agents and 100 people living with HIV/AIDS were educated in income generating programs in developing the capacities of assisted communities in Southern Ethiopia, with the training of 1,000 Community Based Reproductive Health Agents, along with many other staff.

In Liberia, increasing health concerns resulted in AHA's establishment of five new clinics, in addition to their pre-existing two health centers and 17 clinics, thus increasing access to essential healthcare services for returnees, ex-combatants and local residents in 2006. In the same year, AHA focused on medical consultations, most commonly for the treatment of malaria, sexually transmitted infections, diarrhea, and respiratory tract infections. As a result, the number of people choosing to access services boomed, as well as a steadier rate in professionally overseen births.

In light of hostilities in the Darfur region of Sudan, AHA implemented an innovative protection programme in 2006. The Enhancement of Civilian Protection from Physical Atrocities project put into operation measures to safeguard vulnerable populations, especially IDPs, from imminent harm and avert recurring harm. AHA's work included; the training and implementation of Protection Officers, facilitated dialogue, trust and confidence building exercises, increased co-ordination with external protection forces and ways to address resource scarcity. By 2007, protective measures were put in place against gender violence in the Darfur region, in addition to the initiation of income generation projects to support Darfurians living in camps based in El-Fasher. Among many of the income generation projects initiated, AHA strengthened its activities in animal health treatment activities in Kilmando, Wadaáh and Dar Salam areas of Darfur. Camels, cattle, donkeys, and chickens are basic assets for the wellbeing of Darfurians who economically rely on their animals to transport firewood, haul water, and to provide income and food. Over the years since 2007, AHA has saved the lives of thousands of livestock in Sudan thus ensuring food security for many conflict-affected populations and easing tensions between communities.

Cognizant of the devastating personal and socio-economic impacts of Sexual and Gender Based Violence (SGBV), AHA made SGBV a top priority in 2007, with offices in Rwanda, Namibia and Burundi notably spearheading these efforts. AHA created a working group on GBV in Rwanda, which provided training to numerous relevant partners, including refugee and community members. 2007 saw UNHCR assign a consultant to work on gender equality and SGBV in the Osire camp in Namibia, bringing about awareness and ultimately sexual behavior, while in Burundi AHA initiated a series of training and information/education session where audio-visual aids were used to send clear messages about the importance of prevention.

Throughout 2008 training programmes were held with the aim of developing existing skills and impart a sustainable means of living. Training was provided to refugees in Burundi on income generation concept and management as well as other practical teachings of six months in sewing and carpentry. Close to 140 income generating associations were gearing to launch their activities some of whom have already benefited from their initiatives to develop selected activities for which they received money. Meanwhile, AHA's Zambia Assistance for Urban Refugees programme worked to build the capacities of refugees integrated with host communities through several projects such as support for refugee children by facilitating basic primary education and overseeing 30 education scholarship programmes in an attempt to secure a brighter future.

AHA executed its Early Epidemics Detection scheme in 2008 and successfully controlled the outbreak of meningitis, Ebola and cholera in the Adjumani District of Uganda as well as reducing the child and maternal mortality rates. 2008 marked a successful year in terms of access, proximity, consultation, drug availability and referral and paramedic services to refugees and communities in Uganda.

In 2009, AHA supplied potable water to the growing number of refugees in Aysaita and Berhale camp of Ethiopia through a tripartite agreement with UNHCR and the Government of Ethiopia's Administration for Refugee Affairs (ARRA) established in 2008. Both camps are now supplied with the standard 20 liters of water per day and newly constructed sanitation facilities. In addition, AHA was responsible for the erection and management of shelters at the Boko Mayo and Melkadida refugee camps in the Somali region of Eastern Ethiopia.

In the same year, to combat the high level of communicable diseases such as malaria, STI, respiratory tract infections and diarrhea, AHA worked closely with the Ministry of Health in Liberia by launching numerous promotional activities that has helped sensitize communities and engaged them in various forms of similar activities.

AHA's efforts in the relief and recovery of refugees in the DRC are concentrated in two provinces: the Katanga and Equateur Provinces. 2009 was a year of much progress in capacity development in these two provinces. In Katanga, AHA's repatriation based projects provided medical attention and assistance to returnees from Zambia and Tanzania. AHA has also facilitated the construction of latrines and showers, as well as furniture replenishments such as closets and chair in Katanga. In the Equateur Province, AHA collaborated with other INGOs to be the implementing partner of the UNHCR in efforts to improve the health status of returnees. Some of the programmes that were implemented included:

- Community awareness of HIV/AIDS,
- Malnutrition,
- Malaria, and
- Hygiene

In 2010, AHA provided Ethiopian refugee communities at risk of infection with HIV/AIDS services. More than 3,000 young refugees participated in an adolescent and youth education initiative on sexually transmitted diseases in Southern Ethiopia. Peer educators and counselors were guided on a monthly basis in places like Wolayita and Gamo Goffa zones, while schools and community based anti-AIDS clubs were supported at various capacities in the zones. With an objective of improving healthcare at household and community levels, AHA also focused on over 3 million beneficiaries with a need for improved healthcare for newborns and mothers in 28 districts of Gamo Goffa, Hadiya, Kembata Tembaro and Wolayita zones of Southern Ethiopia.

Consecutively, in their relief and recovery efforts, AHA was mandated with the management of Makeni and Chilenje Transit Centers of Zambia in 2010. AHA's responsibilities included:

- Provision of accommodation,
- Food and counseling to refugees,
- Arranging transportation to settlement areas, and
- Transferring of refugees in need of medical attention to health centers

473 beneficiaries used these services, 254 of whom where children from the DRC, Burundi, Somalia and Rwanda. The centers also facilitated the resettlement of refugees to other areas including western countries.

== Timeline ==
- 1994 – AHA was founded in response to the Rwanda Genocide.
- 1995 – AHA began to offer services in Angola and Uganda, with healthcare at the core of its work
- 1996 – AHA ventured into shelter development for the first time in Rwanda, helping provide housing for the most vulnerable groups of widows, handicapped, and families caring for orphans.
- 1997 – AHA expanded its services to Burundi, Ethiopia, Liberia, and Sierra Leone
- 1998 – AHA revised financial and personal management procedures and its field operation guidelines to ensure further organizational accountability and transparency.
- 1999 – AHA executed an emergency intervention in response to the Algerian earthquake while initiating Family planning/Reproductive Health and HIV/AIDS projects in 30 rural locations of Ethiopia.
- 2000 – With a new determination for growth, AHA called on financial support from larger institutions as it expanded even further into the African continent, branching into Zambia.
- 2001 – AHA diversified its services in Namibia after full responsibility of Osire Refugee Camp management was transferred to it by the UNHCR.
- 2002 – AHA moved briefly into Somalia with hopes of addressing the ongoing problems in the region.
- 2003 – AHA opened a Liaison Office for East Africa in Nairobi, Kenya, which undertook an assessment mission to Southern Sudan.
- 2004 – AHA continued to grow, providing services to the Democratic Republic of Congo, Republic of Guinea and Sudan. In partnership with the African Union, AHA organized an International Symposium addressing "Building Capacity and Resources of African Non-Governmental Organizations".
- 2005 – AHA established the African Centre for Humanitarian Action, with the n=mission of enhancing partnerships and service delivery between humanitarian organizations.
- 2006 – AHA launched its Volunteer Programme to enable young humanitarians better understand the challenges facing the African continent.
- 2007 – AHA produced its toolkit on the "Responsibility to Protect: from Non-interference to Non-Indifference".
- 2008 – AHA secured a consultative status with the United Nations Economic & Social Council (ECOSOC).
- 2009 – AHA celebrated its 15th anniversary and forges forward in its mission of providing humanitarian assistance to alleviate human suffering. In addition, AHA signed a memorandum of partnership with the Africa Development Bank, helping to build AHA's institutional capacity.
- 2010 – AHA has expanded into Cameroon in the aim of providing primary health care services for the refugees if Central African Republic (CAR).
