= Refugee camp =

Temporary settlement for refugees

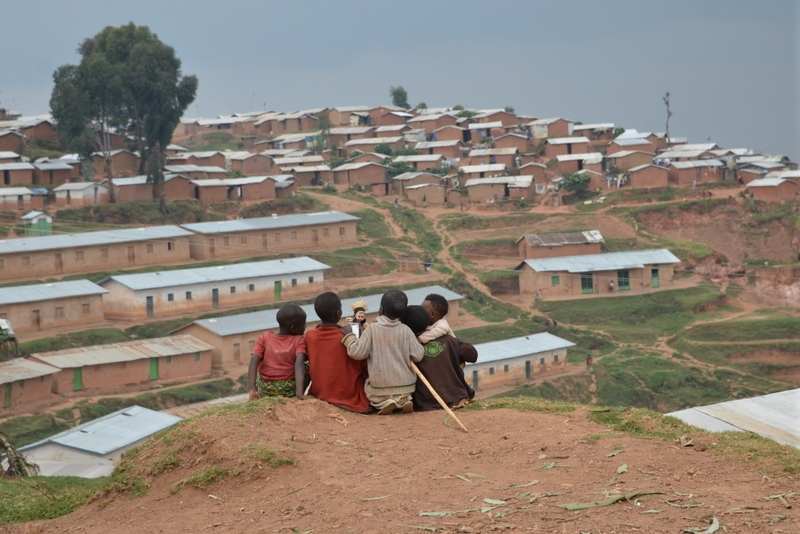
Kiziba refugee camp in the west of Rwanda, 2014

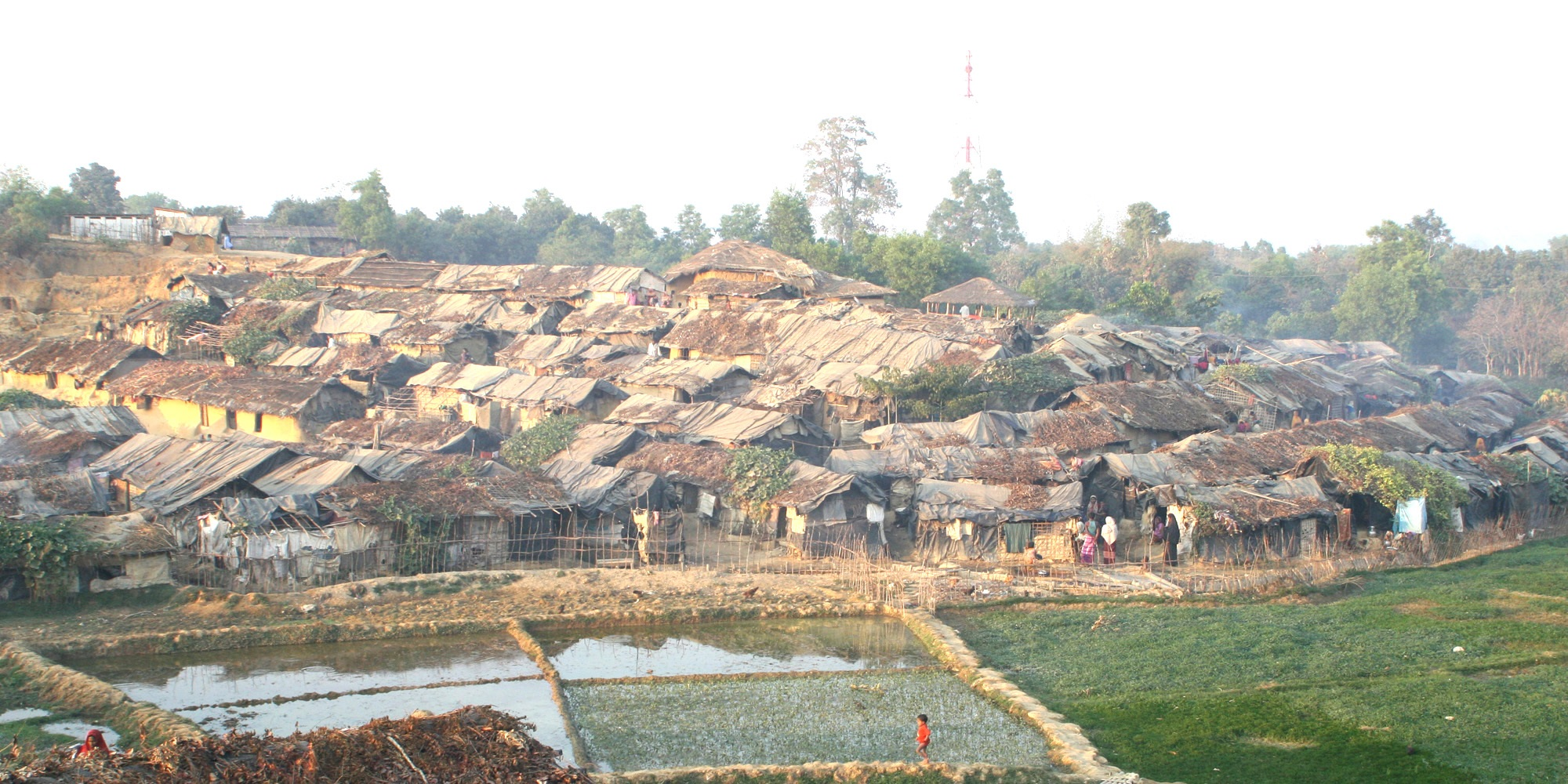
Kutupalong refugee camp, world's largest refugee camp situated in Bangladesh, 2016

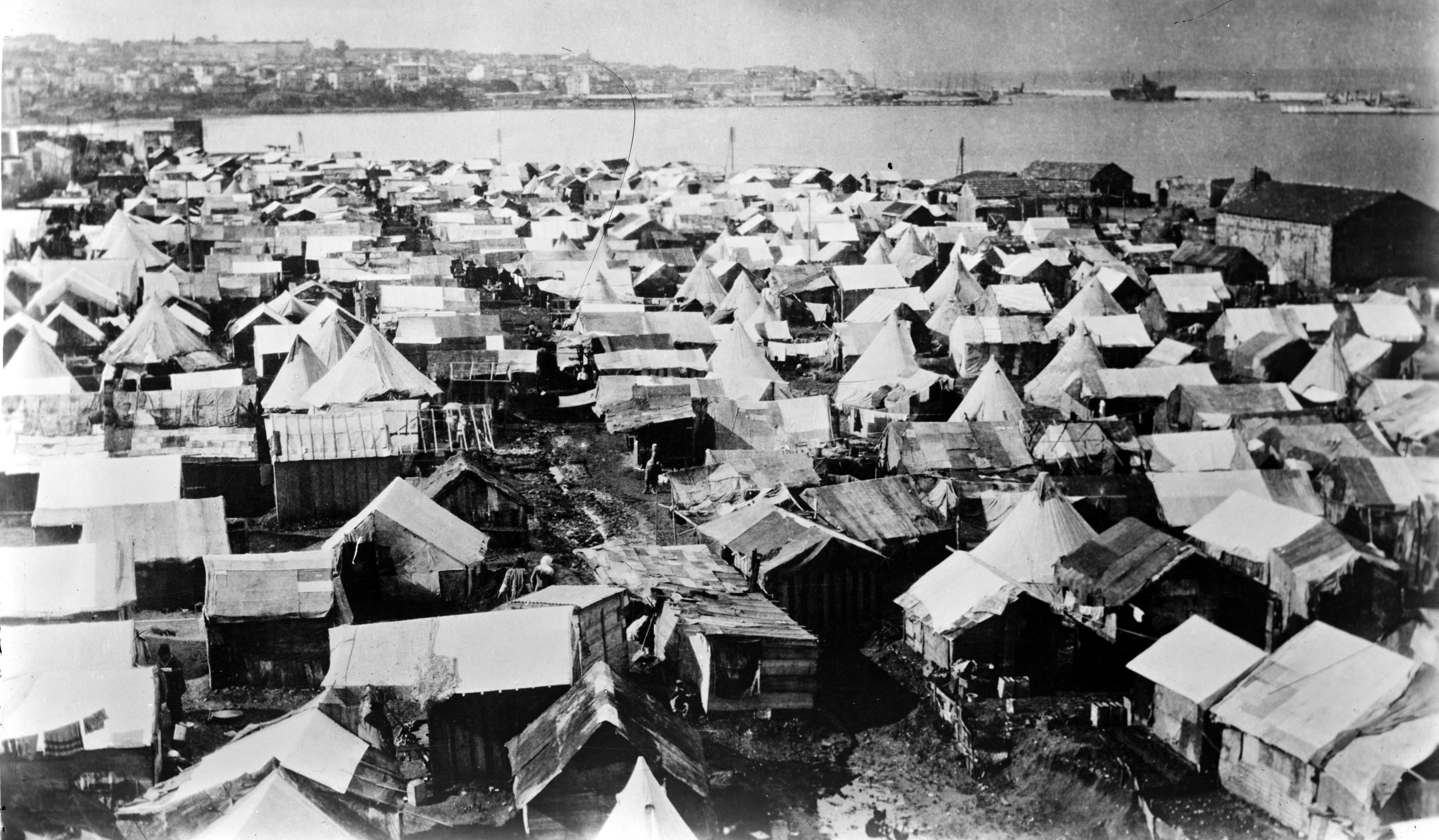
Refugee camp in Beirut, c. 1920–25

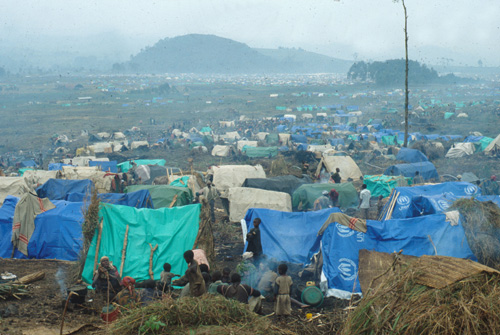
Refugee camp (located in present-day eastern Congo-Kinshasa) for Rwandans following the Rwandan genocide of 1994

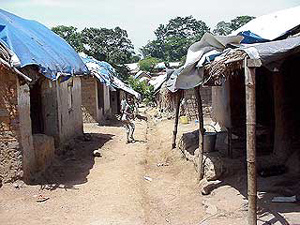
A camp in Guinea for refugees from Sierra Leone

Mitzpe Ramon, development camp for Jewish refugees, southern Israel, 1957

A refugee camp is a temporary settlement built to receive refugees and people in refugee-like situations. Refugee camps usually accommodate displaced people who have fled their home country, but camps are also made for internally displaced people. Usually, refugees seek asylum after they have escaped war in their home countries, but some camps also house environmental and economic migrants. Camps with over a hundred thousand people are common, but as of 2012, the average-sized camp housed around 11,400. They are usually built and run by a government, the United Nations, international organizations (such as the International Committee of the Red Cross), or non-governmental organization. Unofficial refugee camps, such as Idomeni in Greece or the Calais jungle in France, are where refugees are largely left without the support of governments or international organizations.

Refugee camps generally develop in an impromptu fashion with the aim of meeting basic human needs for only a short time. Facilities that make a camp look or feel more permanent are often prohibited by host country governments. If the return of refugees is prevented (often by civil war), a humanitarian crisis can result or continue.

According to UNHCR, most refugees worldwide do not live in refugee camps. At the end of 2015, some 67% of refugees around the world lived in individual, private accommodations. This can be partly explained by the high number of Syrian refugees renting apartments in urban agglomerations across the Middle East. Worldwide, slightly over a quarter (25.4%) of refugees were reported to be living in managed camps. At the end of 2015, about 56% of the total refugee population in rural locations resided in a managed camp, compared to the 2% who resided in individual accommodation. In urban locations, the overwhelming majority (99%) of refugees lived in individual accommodations, compared with less than 1% who lived in a managed camp. A small percentage of refugees also live in collective centres, transit camps, and self-settled camps.

Despite 74% of refugees being in urban areas, the service delivery model of international humanitarian aid agencies remains focused on the establishment and operation of refugee camps.

== Facilities ==
The average camp size is recommended by UNHCR to be 45 square metres (480 sq ft) per person of the accessible camp area. Within this area, the following facilities can usually be found:

- An administrative headquarters to coordinate services may be inside or outside the actual camp.
- Sleeping accommodations are frequently tents, prefabricated huts, or dwellings constructed of locally available materials. UNHCR recommends a minimum of 3.5 m^{2} of covered living area per person. Shelters should be at least 2 m apart.
- Gardens attached to the family plot: UNHCR recommends a plot size of 15 m^{2} per person.
- Hygiene facilities, such as washing areas, latrines, or toilets: UNHCR recommends one shower per 50 persons and one communal latrine per 20 persons. Distance for the latter should be no more than 50 meters from the shelter and not closer than 6 m. Hygiene facilities should be separated by gender.
- Places for water collection: Either water tanks where water is off-loaded from trucks (then filtered and potentially treated with disinfectant chemicals such as chlorine), or water tap stands that are connected to boreholes are needed. UNHCR recommends 20 L of water per person and one tap stand per 80 persons that should be no farther than 200 m away from households.
- Clinics, hospitals and immunization centres: UNHCR recommends one health centre per 20,000 persons and one referral hospital per 200,000 persons.
- Food distribution and therapeutic feeding centres: UNHCR recommends one food distribution centre per 5,000 persons and one feeding centre per 20,000 persons.
- Communication equipment (e.g. radio): Some long-standing camps have their own radio stations.
- Security, including protection from banditry (e.g. barriers and security checkpoints) and peacekeeping troops to prevent armed violence: Police stations may be outside the actual camp.
- Schools and training centres: UNHCR recommends one school per 5,000 persons.

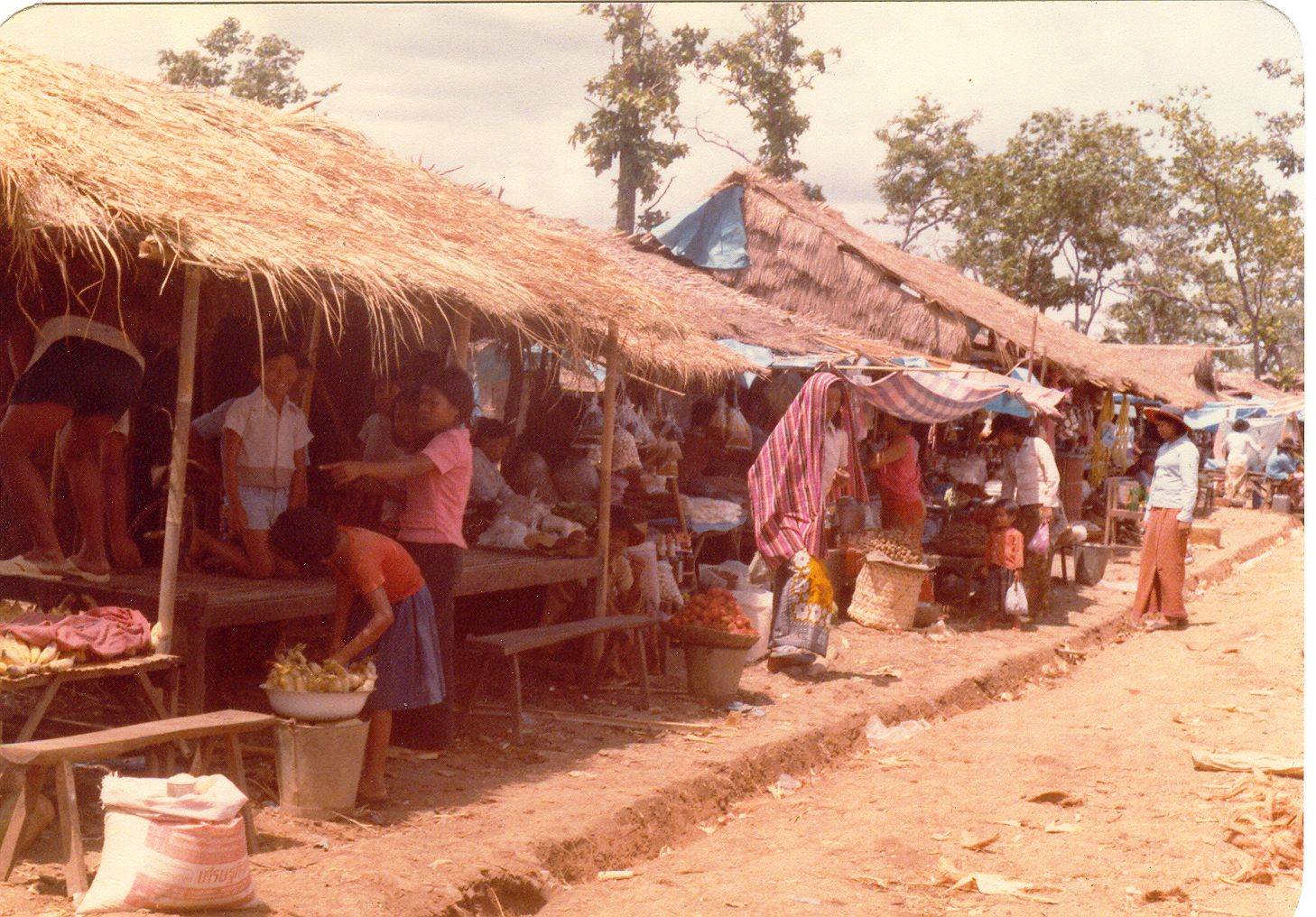
Market stalls at Nong Samet Refugee Camp in 1984: The market was established and run by the refugees and sold goods from Thailand, as well as food, supplies, and medicines distributed by aid agencies.

- Markets and shops: UNHCR recommends one marketplace per 20,000 persons.

Schools and markets may be prohibited by the host country's government to discourage refugees from settling permanently in camps. Many refugee camps also have:

- Cemeteries or crematoria
- Locations for solid waste disposal: One 100 L rubbish container should be provided per 50 persons and one refuses pit per 500 persons.
- Reception or transit centre where refugees initially arrive and register before they are allowed into the camp: Reception centres may be outside the camps and closer to the border of the country where refugees enter.
- Churches or other religious centres or places of worship

To understand and monitor an emergency over a period of time, the development and organisation of the camps can be tracked by satellite, and analyzed by GIS.

== Arrival ==
Most new arrivals travel distances up to 500 km on foot. The journey can be dangerous, e.g. wild animals, armed bandits or militias, or landmines. Some refugees are supported by the International Organization for Migration, and some use smugglers. Many new arrivals suffer from acute malnutrition and dehydration. Long queues can develop outside the reception centres, and waiting times of up to two months are possible. People outside the camp are not entitled to official support (but refugees from inside may support them). Some locals sell water or food for excessive prices and make large profits. Not uncommonly, some refugees die while waiting outside the reception centre. They stay in the reception centre until their refugee status is approved and the degree of vulnerability assessed. This usually takes two weeks. They are then taken, usually by bus, to the camp. New arrivals are registered, fingerprinted, and interviewed by the host country's government and the UNHCR. Health and nutrition screenings follow. Those who are extremely malnourished are taken to therapeutic feeding centres and the sick to a hospital. Men and women receive counselling separately from each other to determine their needs. After registration, they are given food rations (until then only high energy biscuits), receive ration cards (the primary marker of refugee status), soap, jerrycans, kitchen sets, sleeping mats, plastic tarpaulins to build shelters (some receive tents or fabricated shelters). Leaders from the refugee community may provide further support to the new arrivals.

== Housing and sanitation ==
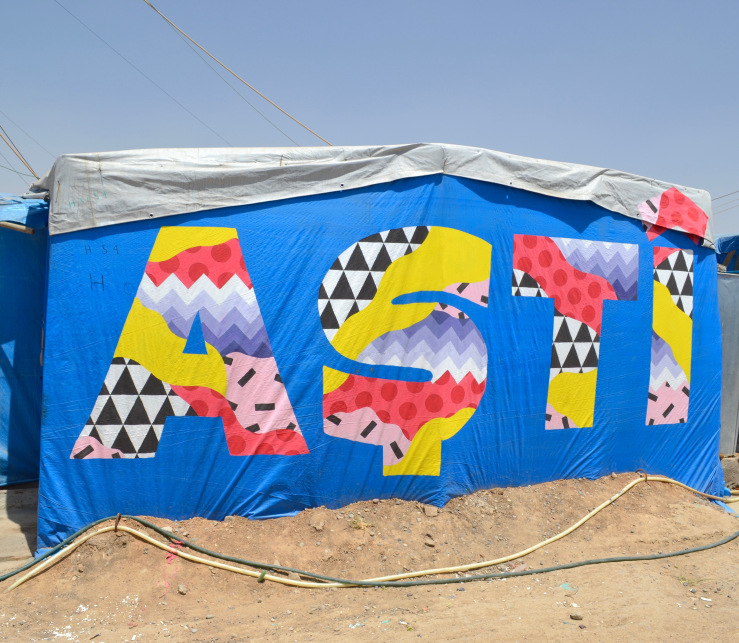
Refugee tent in Iraq (painted by artist Seb Toussaint)

Residential plots are allocated (e.g. 10 x 12 m for a family of four to seven people). Shelters may sometimes be built by refugees themselves with locally available materials, but aid agencies may supply materials or even prefabricated housing. Shelters are frequently very close to each other, and frequently, many families share a single dwelling, rendering privacy for couples nonexistent. Camps may have communal unisex pit latrines shared by many households, but aid agencies may provide improved sanitation facilities. Household pit latrines may be built by families themselves. Latrines may not always be kept sufficiently clean and disease-free. In some areas, space for new pits is limited. Each refugee is supposed to receive around 20 L of water a day, but many have to survive on much less than that (some may get as little as 8 L per day). A high number of persons may use a tap stand (against a standard number of one per 80 persons). Drainage of water from bathroom and kitchen use may be poor and garbage may be disposed of in a haphazard fashion. Few or no sanitary facilities may be accessible for people with disabilities. Poor sanitation may lead to outbreaks of infectious disease, and rainy-season flooding of latrine pits increases the risk of infection.

== Food rations ==
The World Food Programme (WFP) provides food rations twice a month: 2,100 calories/person/day. Ideally, it should be:

- 9 oz (260 g) whole grain (maize or sorghum)
- 7 oz (200 g) milled grain (wheat flour)
- 1.5 tbsp (23 mL) vegetable oil
- 1 tsp (5 mL) salt
- 3 tbsp (45 mL) pulses (beans or lentils)

Diet is insensitive to cultural differences and household needs. WFP is frequently unable to provide all of these staples, thus calories are distributed through whatever commodity is available, e.g. only maize flour. Up to 90% of the refugees sell part or most of their food ration to get cash. Loss of the ration card means no entitlement to food. In 2015, the WFP introduced electronic vouchers.

== Economy, work, and income ==
Research found that if enough aid is provided, the refugees' stimulus effects can boost the host countries' economies. The UN High Commissioner for Refugees (UNHCR) has a policy of helping refugees work and be productive, using their existing skills to meet their own needs and needs of the host country, too:

Ensure the right of refugees to access work and other livelihood opportunities as they are available for nationals... Match programme interventions with corresponding levels of livelihood capacity (existing livelihood assets such as skills and past work experience) and needs identified in the refugee population, and the demands of the market... Assist refugees in becoming self-reliant. Cash / food / rental assistance delivered through humanitarian agencies should be short-term and conditional and gradually lead to self-reliance activities as part of longer-term development... Convene internal and external stakeholders around the results of livelihood assessments to jointly identify livelihood support opportunities.

Refugee-hosting countries, though, do not usually follow this policy and instead do not allow refugees to work legally. In many countries, the only option is either to work for a small incentive (with NGOs based in the camp) or to work illegally with no rights and often bad conditions. In some camps, refugees set up their own businesses. Some refugees even became rich with that. Those without a job or without relatives and friends who send remittances, need to sell parts of their food rations to get cash. As support does not usually provide cash, effective demand may not be created

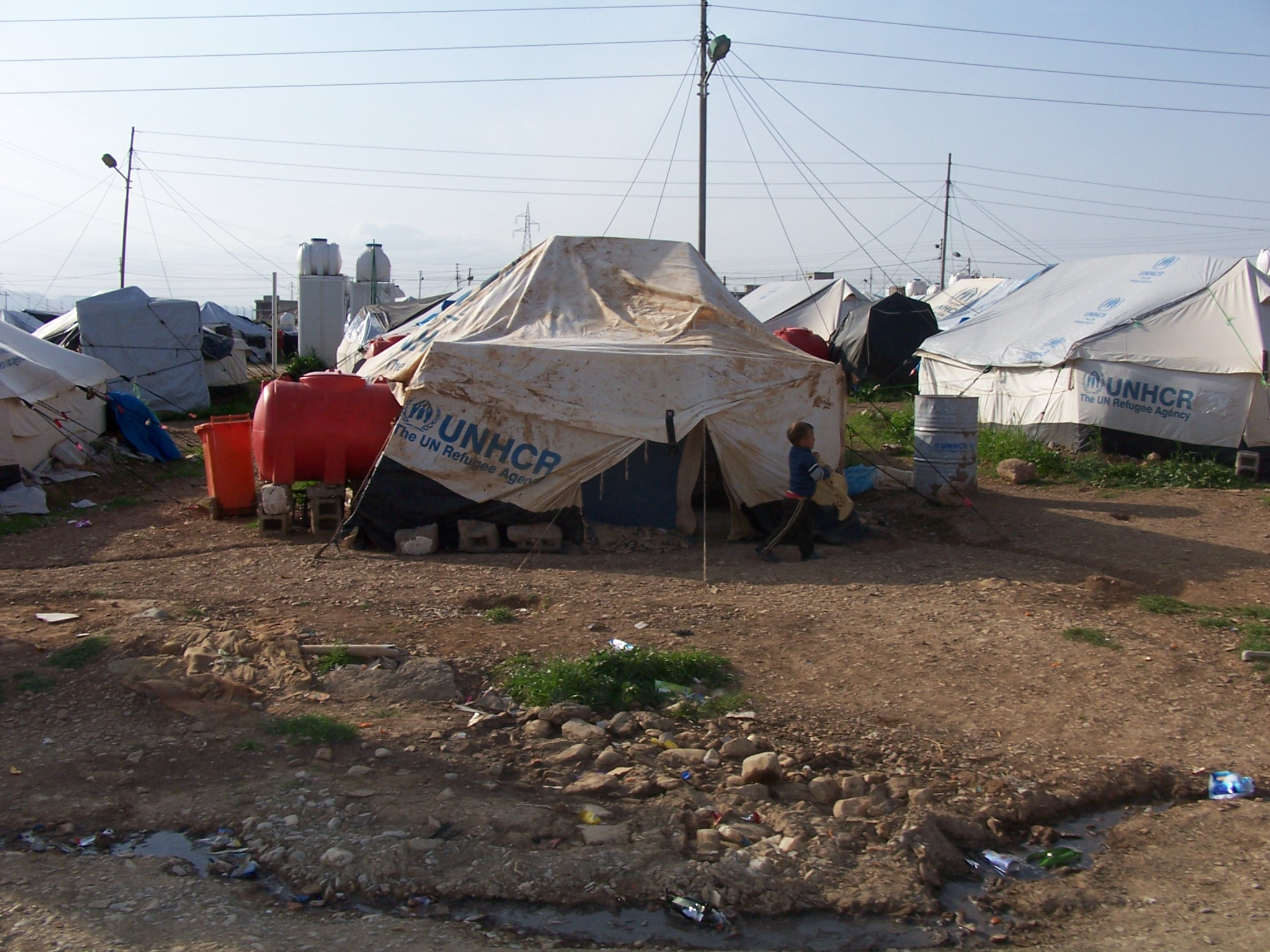
Refugee tents at Arbat Transit Camp for Syrian Refugees in Sulaymaniyah, Iraqi Kurdistan, March 2014

The main markets of bigger camps usually offer electronics, groceries, hardware, medicine, food, clothing, cosmetics, and services such as prepared food (restaurants, coffee–tea shops), laundry, internet and computer access, banking, electronic repairs and maintenance, and education. Some traders specialize in buying food rations from refugees in small quantities and selling them in large quantities to merchants outside the camp. Many refugees buy in small quantities because they do not have enough money to buy normal sizes, i.e. the goods are put in smaller packages and sold for a higher price. Payment mechanisms used in refugee camps include cash aid/vouchers, in-kind payments (such as voluntary work), and community-based saving and lending.

Investment by outside private sector organizations in community-based energy solutions such as diesel generators, solar kiosks and biogas digesters has been identified as a way to promote community economic development and employment.

== Camp structure ==
So, to UNHCR vocabulary a refugee camp consists of settlements, sectors, blocks, communities, and families. Sixteen families make up a community, sixteen communities make up a block, four blocks make up a sector, and four sectors are called a settlement. A large camp may consist of several settlements. Each block elects a community leader to represent the block. Settlements and markets in bigger camps are often arranged according to the nationalities, ethnicities, tribes, and clans of their inhabitants, such as at Dadaab and Kakuma.

== Democracy and justice ==
In those camps where elections are held, elected refugee community leaders are the contact point within the community for both community members and aid agencies. They mediate and negotiate to resolve problems and liaise with refugees, UNHCR, and other aid agencies. Refugees are expected to convey their concerns, messages, or reports of crimes, etc. through their community leaders. Therefore, community leaders are considered to be part of the disciplinary machinery and many refugees mistrust them. There are allegations of aid agencies bribing them. Community leaders can decide what a crime is and thus, whether it is reported to the police or other agencies. They can use their position to marginalize some refugees from minority groups. In Kakuma and Dadaab Refugee Camps in Kenya, Somali refugees have been allowed to establish their own 'court' system which is funded by charities. Elected community leaders and the elders of the communities provide an informal kind of jurisdiction in refugee camps. They preside over these courts and are allowed to pocket the fines they impose. Refugees are left without legal remedies against abuses and cannot appeal against their own 'courts'.

== Security ==
Security in a refugee camp is usually the responsibility of the host country and is provided by the military or local police. The UNHCR only provides refugees with legal protection, not physical protection. However, local police or the legal system of the host countries may not take responsibility for crimes that occur within camps. In many camps, refugees create their own patrolling systems as police protection is insufficient. Most camps are enclosed with barbed wire fences. This is not only for the protection of the refugees, but also to prevent refugees from moving freely or interacting with local people.

Refugee camps may sometimes serve as headquarters for the recruitment, support and training of guerrilla organizations engaged in fighting in the refugees' area of origin; such organizations often use humanitarian aid to supply their troops. Cambodian refugee camps in Thailand and Rwandan refugee camps in Zaire supported armed groups until their destruction by military forces.

Refugee camps are also places where terror attacks, bombings, militia attacks, stabbings and shootings take place and abductions of aid workers are not unheard of. The police can also play a role in attacks on refugees.

== Health and health care ==
Due to crowding and lack of infrastructure, refugee camps are often unhygienic, leading to a high incidence of infectious diseases and epidemics. Sick or injured refugees rely on free health care provided by aid agencies in camps, and may not have access to health services outside of a camp setting. Some aid agencies employ outreach workers who make visits from tent to tent to offer medical assistance to ill and malnourished refugees, but resources are often scarce. Vulnerable persons who have difficulties accessing services may be supported through individual case management. Common infectious diseases include diarrhea from various causes, malaria, viral hepatitis, measles, meningitis, respiratory infections such as influenza, and urinary/reproductive tract infections. Scabies has been one of the most frequently observed medical conditions in refugee camps worldwide, including in Europe. These are exacerbated by malnutrition. In some camps, guards exchange food and money for sex with young girls and women, in what is called "survival sex".

=== Reproductive health ===
The UNHCR is responsible for providing reproductive health services to refugee populations and in camps. This includes educating refugees on reproductive health, family planning, giving them access to healthcare professionals for their reproductive needs and providing necessary supplies such as feminine hygiene products.

=== Mental health ===
Refugees experience a wide range of traumas in their home country and during their journey to other countries. However, the mental health problems resulting from violent conflicts, such as PTSD and disaster-induced depression, can be compounded by problems induced by the conditions of refugee camps. Mental health concerns within humanitarian aid programs include stress about one's home country, isolation from support structures, and loss of personal identity and agency.

These consequences are increased by the daily stresses of displacement and life within camps, including ongoing risks of violence, lack of basic services, and uncertainty about the future. Women and girls in camps often fear being alone, especially at night, because of the risk of trafficking and sexual violence. The most prevalent clinical problems among Syrian refugees are depression, prolonged grief disorder, PTSD, and anxiety disorders. However, the perception of mental health is affected by cultural and religious values that result in different modes of expressing distress or making sense of psychological symptoms. In addition, refugees who have experienced torture often endure somatic symptoms in which emotional distress from torture is expressed in physical forms.

Unique conditions for the mental health of refugees within camps has led to the development of alternative psychological interventions and approaches. Some mental health services address the effects of negative discourses about migrants and the way that traumatic experiences affect and fragment identity. A therapeutic support project in the Calais refugee camp focused on building spaces of collectivity and community, such as youth groups, to challenge the individualization of distress and trauma. This project encouraged discussion of refugees' small acts of resistance to difficult situations and promoted activities from migrants' cultural roots to develop a positive conception of identity. Other mental health approaches acknowledge core cultural tenets and work to structure the camp itself around these values. For example, in Afghan refugee camps in Pakistan, Pakistani policy prioritized the centrality of personal dignity and collective honour in the cultural traditions of Afghan migrants and constructed "refugee tented villages" that grouped people within their own ethnolinguistic, tribal, or regional communities.

== Freedom of movement ==
Once admitted to a camp, refugees usually do not have the freedom to move about the country but are required to obtain Movement Passes from the UNHCR and the host country's government. Yet informally many refugees are mobile and travel between cities and the camps, or otherwise make use of networks or technology in maintaining these links. Due to widespread corruption in public service, there is a grey area that creates space for refugees to manoeuvre. Many refugees in the camps, given the opportunity, try to make their way to cities. Some refugee elites even rotate between the camp and the city or rotate periods in the camp with periods elsewhere in the country in family networks, sometimes with another relative in a Western country that contributes financially. Refugee camps may serve as a safety net for people who go to cities or who attempt to return to their countries of origin. Some refugees marry nationals so that they can bypass the police rules regarding movements out of the camps. It is a lucrative side-business for many police officers working the area around the camps to have a lot of unofficial roadblocks and to target refugees travelling outside the camps who must pay bribes to avoid deportation.

== Duration and durable solutions ==
Although camps are intended to be a temporary solution, some of them exist for decades. Some Palestinian refugee camps have existed since 1948, camps for Eritreans in Sudan (such as the Shagarab camp) have existed since 1968, the Sahrawi refugee camps in Algeria has existed since 1975, camps for Burmese in Thailand (such as the Mae La refugee camp) have existed since 1986, Buduburam in Ghana since 1990, or Dadaab and Kakuma in Kenya since 1991 and 1992, respectively. In fact, over half of the refugees as of the end of 2017 are in "protracted refugee situations", defined as situations where at least 25,000 people from a particular country are refugees in another particular country for five or more years (though this might not be representative of refugees who are specifically in camps). The longer a camp exist the lower tends to be the annual international funding and the bigger the implications for human rights. Some camps grow into permanent settlements and even merge with nearby older communities, such as Ain al-Hilweh, Lebanon and Deir al-Balah, Palestine.

People may stay in these camps, receiving emergency food and medical aid, for many years and possibly even for their whole life. To prevent this the UNHCR promotes three alternatives to that:

- Once it is safe for them to return to their home countries the refugees can use voluntary return programmes.
- In some cases, refugees may be integrated and naturalised by the country they fled to.
- In some cases, often after several years, refugees may get the offer to be resettled in "third countries". Globally, about 17 countries (Australia, Brazil, Burkina Faso, Canada, Chile, Denmark, Finland, Iceland, Ireland, Mexico, the Netherlands, New Zealand, Norway, Sweden, the United Kingdom, and the United States) regularly accept "quota refugees" from refugee camps. The UNHCR works in partnership with these countries and resettlement programmes, such as the Gateway Protection Programme, that support refugees after arrival in the new countries. In recent years, most quota refugees have come from Afghanistan, Iran, Iraq, Liberia, Somalia, Sudan, Syria, and the former Yugoslavia which have been disrupted by wars and revolutions.

== Notable refugee camps ==
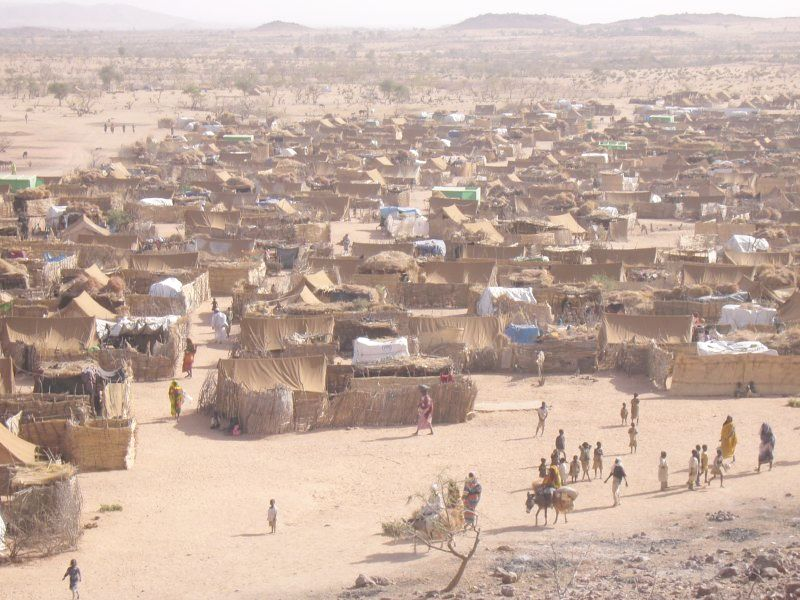
Darfur refugee camp in Chad

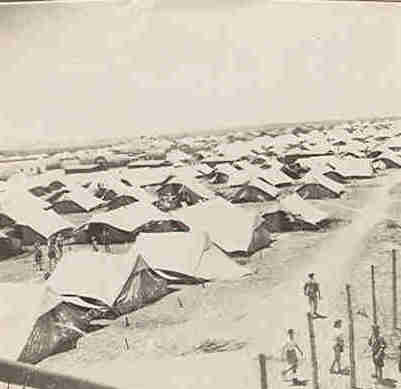
Cyprus deportation camp (1946–49)

The largest refugee settlements in the world are in the eastern Sahel region of Africa. For many years the Dadaab complex was the largest until it was surpassed by Bidi Bidi in 2017. Bidi Bidi was in turn surpassed by Bangladesh's Kutupalong refugee camp in 2018.

=== Africa ===
- A number of camps in the south of Chad – such as Dosseye, Kobitey, Mbitoye, Danamadja, Sido, Doyaba and Djako – host approximately 113,000 refugees from Central African Republic.
- Ali Addeh (or Ali Adde) and Holhol camps in Djibouti host 23,000 refugees, who are mainly from Somalia, but also Ethiopians and Eritreans.
- Benaco and Ngara in Tanzania.
- Buduburam refugee camp in Ghana, home to more than 12,000 Liberians (opened 1990)
- Bwagiriza and Gatumba refugee camps in Burundi host refugees from the DRC.
- By 2013 there were four camps in Maban County, South Sudan, hosting refugees and internally displaced people. Yusuf Batil camp was home to 37,000 refugees, Doro camp to 44,000, Jamam camp to 20,000 and Gendrassa camp to 10,000. These population numbers are subject to fluctuation during the ongoing violence in the country.
- Cameroon hosted more than 240,000 UNHCR registered refugees in 2014, mainly from the Central African Republic: Minawao refugee camp in the north and Gado Badzere, Borgop, Ngam, Timangolo, Mbilé and Lolo refugee camps in the east of Cameroon.
- Choucha camp in Tunisia hosted nearly 20,000 refugees from 13 countries who fled from Libya in 2011. Half of them are sub-Saharan African and Arab refugees and the other half are Bangladeshis who had been working in Libya. 3,000 refugees remained in the camp in 2012, and 1,300 in 2013 and its closure is planned.
- Comè in Benin hosted Togolese refugees until it was closed in 2006.
- Dadaab refugee camps (Ifo, Ifo II, Dagahaley, Hagadera, and Kambioos) in North Eastern Kenya, established in 1991 and now hosting more than 330,000 refugees from Somalia.
- Dzaleka camp in the Dowa District of Malawi is home to 34,000 refugees from Burundi, the DRC and Rwanda.
- Hart Sheik in Ethiopia hosted more than 250,000 mostly refugees from Somalia between 1988 and 2004.
- Itang camp in Ethiopia hosted 182,000 refugees from South Sudan and was the world's largest refugee camp for some time during the 1990s.
- Jomvu, Hatimy and Swaleh Nguru camps near Mombasa, Kenya, were closed in 1997. Refugees, mainly displaced people from Somalia, were either forced to relocate to Kakuma, repatriated or remunerated to voluntarily relocate into unsafe areas in Somalia. Other closed camps in the area include Liboi, Oda, Walda, Thika, Utange and Marafa.
- Kakuma refugee camp in Kenya was opened in 1991. In 2014, it was the third largest refugee camp worldwide. As of December 2020, Kakuma hosts 200,000 people, mostly migrants from the civil war in South Sudan.
- Kala, Meheba and Mwange camps in the northwest of Zambia host refugees from Angola and DRC.
- Lainé and Kouankan (I & II) camps in Guinea hosted nearly 29,300 refugees mostly from Liberia, Sierra Leone, and Côte d'Ivoire. The number reduced to 15,000 in 2009.
- Lazaret in Niger was the largest camp in the Sahel during the extreme drought of 1973–1975 and mainly hosted Tuareg people.
- Lusenda refugee camp in the Democratic Republic of the Congo houses Burundian refugees from across the border.
- M'Bera camp in southeastern Mauritania hosts 50,000 Malian refugees.
- Mentao camp in Burkina Faso hosts 13,000 Malian refugees.
- Nyarugusu refugee camp in Tanzania opened in 1997 and initially hosted 60.000 refugees from the DRC. Due to the recent conflicts in Burundi, it also hosts 90.000 refugees from Burundi. In 2014 it was the 9th largest refugee camp. However, since the conflict in Burundi it is considered one of the world's biggest and most overcrowded camps.
- Osire camp in central Namibia was established in 1992 to accommodate refugees from Angola, Burundi, the DRC, Rwanda and Somalia. It had 20,000 inhabitants in 1998 and only 3,000 in 2014.
- PTP camp near Zwedru, Bahn camp and Little Wlebo camp in eastern Liberia is home to 12,000 refugees from Ivory Coast.
- Ras Ajdir camp, close to the Tunisian border in Libya, was opened in 2011 and is housing between 20,000 and 30,000 Libyan refugees.
- Sahrawi refugee camps near Tindouf, South Western Algeria, were opened circa 1976 and are called Laayoune, Smara, Awserd, 27 February, Rabouni, Daira of Bojador and Dakhla.
- There are 12 camps in the east of Chad hosting approximately 250,000 Sudanese refugees from the Darfur region in Sudan. These camps are in Breidjing, Oure Cassoni, Mile, Treguine, Iridimi, Touloum, Kounoungou, Goz Amer, Farchana, Am Nabak, Gaga and Djabal. Some of these camps appear in the documentary Google Darfur.
- There are 12 camps, such as Shagarab and Wad Sharifey, in eastern Sudan. They host around 66,000 mostly Eritrean refugees, the first of whom arrived in 1968.
- There are a number of camps close to Dolo Odo in southern Ethiopia, hosting refugees from Somalia. In 2014 the Dolo Odo camps (Melkadida, Bokolmanyo, Buramino, Kobe Camp, Fugnido, Hilaweyn and Adiharush) were considered to be the second largest.
- There are a number of camps in Rwanda that host 85,000 refugees from the DRC: Gihembe, Kigeme, Kiziba, Mugombwa and Nyabiheke camps.
- There are a rapidly growing number of camps in Uganda, such as Nakivale, Kayaka II, Kyangwali and Rwamwanja. They host 170,000 refugees from South Sudan and the Democratic Republic Of Congo.
- Tongogara Refugee Camp in Zimbabwe was established for Mozambican refugees in 1984 and housed 58,000 of them in 1994.

=== Asia ===
- Ban Mai Nai Soi refugee camp in Burma hosted 19,512 Karenni people in 2008.
- Champtala is a camp in Afghanistan that hosts Afghan refugees who returned from Pakistan.
- Galang Refugee Camp in Indonesia accommodated Indochinese refugees between 1979 and 1996.
- Mae La refugee camp in Thailand hosted around 40,000 Burmese in 2020, most whom were Karen ethnicity. It is the largest of a series of refugee camps coordinated by the Karen Refugee Committee in Thailand.
- Niatak and Torbat-e Jam camps in Iran host Afghan refugees.
- Philippine Refugee Processing Center for Vietnamese, Laotian, and Cambodian refugees fleeing wars in Indochina.
- There are a number of camps in Nepal, such as the three Beldangi refugee camps, Goldhap, Khudunabari, Sanischare and Timai hosting Bhutanese refugees. They are Lhotshampas who were forced to flee from Bhutan to Nepal.
- There are a number of camps in Pakistan that host Afghan refugees, such as Panian, Nasir Bagh, Old Shamshatoo, Old Akora, Gamkol, Barakai, Badaber, Girdi Jungle, Azakhel and Saranan. Jelazee camp, which also hosted Afghan refugees was closed in 2001, because of security concerns.
- There are a number of camps, such as Puzhal, for Sri Lankan Tamils, established in Tamil Nadu in India in 1983, with over 110,000 refugees by 1998.
- There are two camps, Nayapara and Kutupalong, in south-eastern Bangladesh hosting 30,000 registered Rohingya people who fled from Myanmar. It is estimated that 200,000 undocumented Rohingya refugees are living outside the camps with little access to humanitarian assistance. Kutupalong camp may become one of the world's largest refugee camps as there are plans to extend it, so up to 800,000 Rohingya refugees can be housed.
- There were a number of camps on the Thai-Cambodian border in Thailand which hosted Khmer people and Vietnamese between 1979 and 1993 (see Indochina refugee crisis and Cambodian humanitarian crisis), such as Nong Samet, Nong Chan, Sa Kaeo, Site Two, and Khao-I-Dang. There were also camps in the Thai-Laotian border region, hosting Hmong people and Laotians, such as Ban Vinai and Nong Khai. These camps existed between 1975, and final closure in the 1990s.
- Whitehead Camp, Hong Kong, considered the "world's largest prison" in the early 1990s

=== Middle East ===
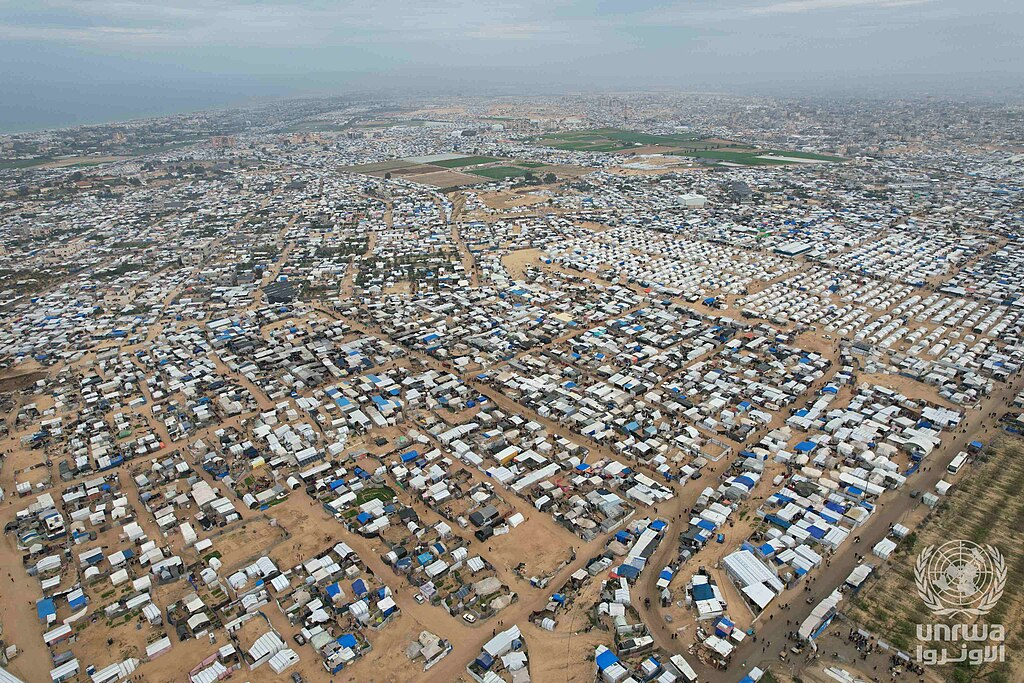
Palestinian refugee camp in the Gaza Strip, January 2025

- Al Kharaz in Yemen hosts 14,000 refugees from Somalia who crossed the Gulf of Aden.
- Al-Mazraq camps (1–3) host around 24,000 internally displaced persons in Yemen.
- Camps for Syrian refugees in Iraqi Kurdistan, including Domiz in Dohuk Governorate, Arbat in Sulaymaniyah, and Qushtapa, Basirma, Gawilan, Kawergosk and Darashakran in Erbil Governorate. (see also Syrian refugee camps in Iraqi Kurdistan)
- Camps for Syrian refugees in Turkey, such as Urfa, Kilis Oncupinar, Gaziantep and those in the Hatay Province that were opened in 2011 (see also Syrian refugee camps in Turkey).
- Immigrant camps (Israel) (1947–1950) and Ma'abarot transition camps (1950–1963) to accommodate Jewish refugees and immigrants in Israel.
- Mrajeeb Al Fhood refugee camp in Jordan, hosting 4,200 and Azraq camp, hosting 26,000 Syrian refugees.
- Palestinian refugee camps were opened between 1948 and 1968. The 59 camps are recognized by the UNRWA and host 1.5 million refugees in Jordan, Lebanon, Syria, the West Bank and the Gaza Strip. Today the former camps were developed to towns. These towns contain the world's largest and oldest refugee population. Yarmouk camp, just outside Damascus, is one of them and was once home to half a million Palestinian refugees (about 18,000 in 2015). It has been besieged by Bashar al-Assad's regime in 2012 and came again under attack by the Islamic State group in 2015.
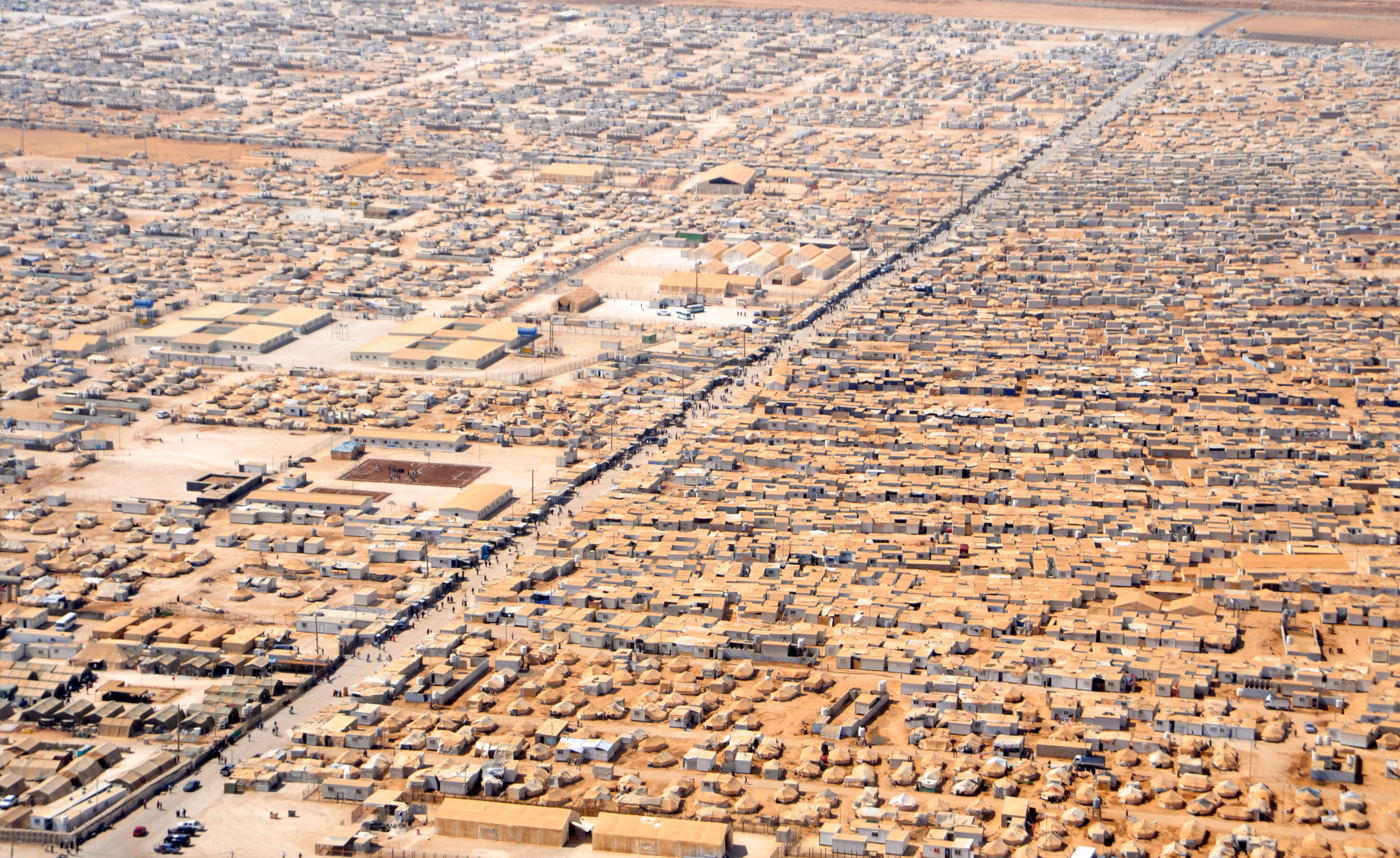
  Aerial view of Zaatari Refugee Camp in Jordan, July 2013
- There are camps for displaced Syrians within Syria such as Qah or the Olive Tree Camp.
- Three camps received Palestinian refugees from Iraq: Al Tanf, Al Hol and Al Waleed. There are around 2,000 refugees in Al Hol and in Al Waleed camp, which is on the Iraqi side of the border. Al Tanf, which was on the Syrian side and hosted 1,600 Palestinians, was closed in 2010. An effort was made to close Al Tanf because the refugees' freedom of movement was severely restricted and the desert environment, with its sandstorms and extreme temperatures, was too harsh. Most of the refugees who lived there were resettled to third countries.
- Zaatari refugee camp in Jordan, hosting 144,000 Syrian refugees as of July 2013, although the population in November 2013 had dropped to around 112,000 as the Syrian civil war continues.

=== Europe ===
- Cyprus internment camps (1946–1949) to accommodate Jewish refugees and Holocaust survivors
- Ħal Far, Malta, for African immigrants.
- Lampedusa immigrant reception center for refugees, asylum seekers and other immigrants on the Italian island of Lampedusa.
- Moria, Oreokastro, Katsikas, Idomeni, and other camps on the Greek islands of Lesbos, Samos, and Chios have rapidly filled (up to 3–4 times more than their official capacity) with migrants fleeing violence in the Middle East and Africa. Since 2015, refugees fleeing conflict such as the Syrian Civil War have attempted to enter Europe but are often stopped in Greece, where they spend, on average, 8 months to a year in camps. Some camps have been destroyed or evacuated, including the evacuation of 4,000 residents from a camp on the island of Lesbos (capacity 1,500) from a tent fire that destroyed more than half the camp.

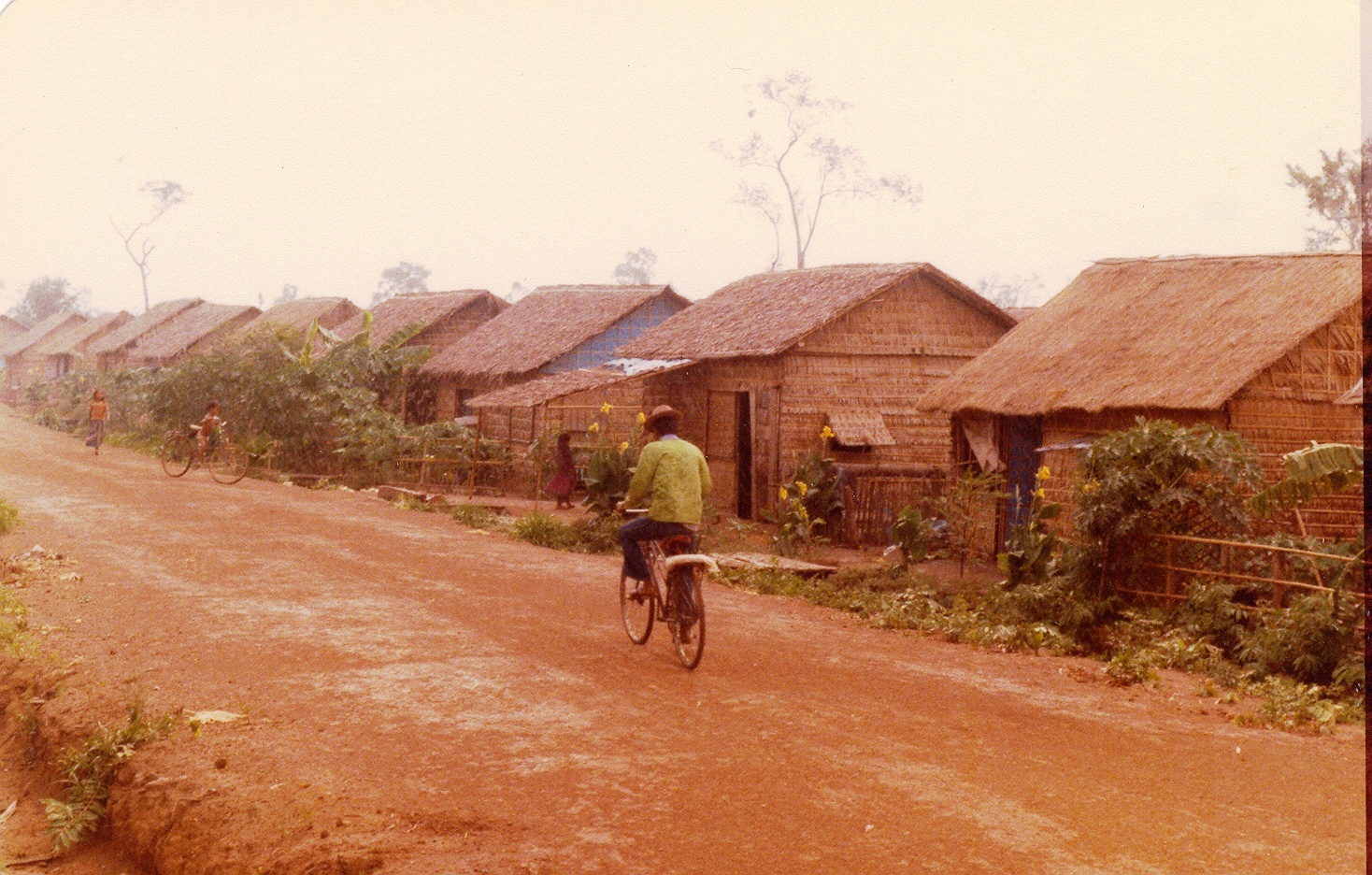
Nong Samet Refugee Camp on the Thai-Cambodian border, May 1984

- Bagnoli camp in Naples, Italy, housed up to 10,000 refugees from Eastern Europe between 1946 and 1951.
- Čardak was a camp in Serbia, for Serbs who fled from Croatia and Bosnia.
- Friedland refugee camp in Germany hosted refugees who fled from the former eastern territories of Germany at the end of World War II, between 1944 and 1950. Between 1950 and 1987 it was a transit centre for East German (GDR) citizens who wanted to flee to West Germany (FRG).
- International Refugee Organization camp at Lesum, near Bremen, Germany.
- Kjesäter in Sweden was a refugee camp and transit centre for Norwegian refugees fleeing Nazi persecution during World War II.
- Kløvermarken in Denmark was a refugee camp that hosted 19,000 German refugees between 1945 and 1949.
- La Linière and Basroch camps in Grande-Synthe, on the outskirts of Dunkirk, northern France (destroyed by fire on 11 April 2017).
- Sangatte camp and the Calais jungle in northern France.
- The Oksbøl Refugee Camp was the largest camp for German Refugees in Denmark after World War II.
- There are two Emergency Transit Centres for refugees in Europe. One in Timișoara, Romania, and one in Humenné, Slovakia. They can provide a temporary safe haven for refugees who needed to be evacuated immediately from life-threatening situations before being resettled.
- Traiskirchen camp in eastern Austria hosts refugees that come to Europe as part of the European migrant crisis.
- Vrela Ribnička refugee camp in Montenegro was built in 1994 and houses refugees of Bosnian origin who were displaced during the Yugoslav Wars.

== Refugee camps by country and population ==
Populations of concern to UNHCR in refugee camps between 2006 and 2014
Country	Camp	2006	2007	2008	2009	2010	2011	2012	2013	2014
Chad	Am Nabak	16,504	16,701	16,696	17,402	18,087	20,395	23,611	24,513	25,553
Chad	Amboko	12,062	12,002	12,057	11,671	11,111	11,627	11,297	10,719	11,819
Kenya	Dagahaley, Dadaab	39,526	39,626	65,581	93,179	93,470	122,214	121,127	104,565	88,486
Chad	Djabal	15,162	15,602	17,153	15,693	17,200	18,083	18,890	19,635	20,809
Yemen	Al Kharaz	9,298	9,491	11,394	16,466	14,100	16,904	19,047	16,816	16,500
Chad	Breidjing	28,932	30,077	32,669	32,559	34,465	35,938	37,494	39,797	41,146
Malawi	Dzaleka	4,950	8,690	9,425	10,275	12,819	16,853	16,664	16,935	5,874
Chad	Farchana	18,947	19,815	21,183	20,915	21,983	23,323	24,419	26,292	27,548
Kenya	Hagadera, Dadaab	59,185	70,412	90,403	83,518	101,506	137,528	139,483	114,729	106,968
Sudan	Girba	8,996	9,081	5,120	5,645	5,592	5,570	6,252	6,295	6,306
Chad	Gondje	12,624	12,664	12,700	11,184	9,586	10,006	11,717	11,349	12,138
Kenya	Ifo, Dadaab	54,157	61,832	79,469	79,424	97,610	118,972	98,294	99,761	83,750
Chad	Iridimi	17,380	18,269	19,531	18,154	18,859	21,329	21,083	21,976	22,908
Kenya	Kakuma	90,457	62,497	53,068	64,791	69,822	85,862	107,205	128,540	153,959
Sudan	Kilo 26	11,423	12,690	7,133	7,610	7,608	7,634	8,310	8,303	8,391
Chad	Kounoungou	13,315	13,500	18,514	16,237	16,927	18,251	19,143	20,876	21,960
Bangladesh	Kutapalong	10,144	10,708	11,047	11,251	11,469	11,706	12,404	12,626	13,176
Thailand	Mae La	46,148	38,130	32,862	30,073	29,188	27,629	26,690	25,156	46,978
Thailand	Mae La Oon	14,366	13,450	13,478	13,811	11,991	10,204	9,611	8,675	12,245
Thailand	Mae Ra Ma Luang	12,840	11,578	11,304	13,571	11,749	10,269	9,414	8,421	13,825
Chad	Mile	15,557	16,202	17,476	14,221	17,382	18,853	19,823	20,818	21,723
Bangladesh	Nayapara	16,010	16,679	17,076	17,091	17,547	17,729	18,066	18,288	19,179
Thailand	Nu Po	13,131	13,377	11,113	9,800	9,262	15,982	15,715	7,927	13,372
Tanzania	Nyarugusu	52,713	50,841	49,628	62,184	62,726	63,551	68,132	68,888	57,267
Chad	Oure Cassoni	26,786	28,035	28,430	31,189	32,206	36,168	33,267	35,415	36,466
Ethiopia	Shimelba	13,043	16,057	10,648	10,135	9,187	8,295	6,033	5,885	6,106
India	Tamil Nadu	69,609	72,934	73,286	72,883	69,998	68,152	67,165	65,674	65,057
Chad	Touloum	22,358	23,131	24,935	26,532	24,500	27,588	27,940	28,501	29,683
Chad	Treguine	14,921	15,718	17,260	17,000	17,820	19,099	19,957	20,990	21,801
Sudan	Um Gargur	9,845	10,104	8,180	8,715	8,641	8,550	8,947	10,172	10,269
Thailand	Um Pium	19,464	19,397	14,051	12,494	11,742	11,017	10,581	9,816	16,109
Sudan	Wad Sherife	33,371	36,429	13,636	15,626	15,819	15,481	15,472	15,318	15,357
Ethiopia	Fugnido	27,175	18,726	–	20,202	21,770	22,692	34,247	42,044	53,218
Chad	Gaga	12,402	17,708	20,677	19,043	19,888	21,474	22,266	23,236	24,591
Pakistan	Gamkol	–	37,462	33,499	33,033	35,169	32,830	31,701	31,326	30,241
Pakistan	Gandaf	–	13,609	12,659	12,497	12,731	13,346	12,632	12,508	12,068
South Sudan	Gendressa	–	–	–	–	–	–	14,758	17,289	17,975
Rwanda	Gihembe	17,732	18,081	19,027	19,407	19,853	19,827	14,006	–	14,735
Liberia	Bahn	–	–	–	–	–	5,021	8,851	8,412	5,257
Ethiopia	Bambasi	–	–	–	–	–	–	12,199	13,354	14,279
Pakistan	Barakai	–	30,266	28,851	28,597	32,077	28,093	26,739	25,909	24,786
Ethiopia	Tongo	–	–	–	–	–	9,605	9,518	10,399	11,075
Chad	Yaroungou	15,260	13,352	16,573	11,925	10,544	10,916	11,594	–	–
South Sudan	Yusuf Batil	–	–	–	–	–	–	36,754	39,033	40,240
Jordan	Zaatari	–	–	–	–	–	–	–	145,209	84,773
Pakistan	Thall	–	17,266	15,602	15,269	15,419	13,468	12,976	12,847	12,247
Thailand	Tham Hin	7,767	6,007	5,078	–	4,282	7,150	7,242	–	7,406
Nepal	Timai	10,413	10,421	9,935	8,553	7,058	–	–	–	–
Pakistan	Timer	–	13,919	12,080	11,839	11,764	11,161	8,665	8,603	8,690
Algeria	Tindouf	90,000	90,000	90,000	90,000	90,000	90,000	90,000	90,000	90,000
Pakistan	Old Akora	–	41,647	37,757	37,019	42,872	37,736	36,693	36,384	34,789
Pakistan	Old Shamshatoo	–	66,556	58,773	58,804	61,205	54,502	53,573	52,835	48,268
Namibia	Osire	6,486	7,730	8,122	8,506	–	–	–	–	–
Uganda	Pader	–	–	196,000	90,000	38,550	6,677	–	–	–
Pakistan	Padhana	–	10,564	10,403	10,380	11,393	10,075	9,892	9,775	9,362
Pakistan	Panian	–	65,033	62,293	61,822	67,332	58,819	56,820	56,295	53,816
Pakistan	Pir Alizai	–	16,563	14,710	13,802	15,157	10,243	9,771	9,204	7,681
Nepal	Sanischare	21,285	21,386	20,128	16,745	13,649	10,173	9,212	6,599	–
Pakistan	Saranan	–	24,625	24,272	24,119	26,786	21,927	21,218	20,744	18,248
Sudan	Shagarab	21,999	22,706	14,990	16,562	24,104	27,809	37,428	34,147	34,039
Ethiopia	Sheder	–	–	6,567	7,964	10,458	11,326	11,882	11,248	12,263
Ethiopia	Sherkole	13,958	8,989	–	–	–	8,962	7,527	9,737	10,171
Pakistan	Surkhab	–	12,225	11,877	11,789	12,304	7,422	7,214	7,012	5,764
Burkina Faso	Mentao	–	–	–	–	–	–	6,905	11,907	10,953
Tanzania	Mtabila	–	90,680	45,247	36,009	36,789	37,554	–	–	–
Pakistan	Munda	–	13,274	11,386	11,225	12,728	10,341	10,100	9,941	9,388
Burundi	Musasa	–	6,764	5,984	6,572	6,153	6,330	6,500	6,829	7,001
Zambia	Mwange	21,179	17,911	14,429	5,820	–	–	–	–	–
Uganda	Nakivale	25,692	33,176	42,113	52,249	–	–	64,373	–	66,691
Pakistan	New Durrani	–	–	–	–	10,458	14,397	12,438	14,978	–
Pakistan	Oblan	–	11,564	9,624	9,560	10,065	9,474	9,331	9,294	9,015
Liberia	PTP	–	–	–	–	–	–	9,353	12,734	15,300
Uganda	Rhino Camp	18,493	14,328	5,582	–	–	–	4,266	–	18,762
Uganda	Rwamwanja	–	–	–	–	–	–	29,797	–	52,489
Liberia	Little Wlebbo	–	–	–	–	–	–	8,399	10,009	8,481
Tanzania	Lugufu	75,254	45,308	28,995	–	–	–	–	–	–
Tanzania	Lukole	39,685	25,490	–	–	–	–	–	–	–
Thailand	Mai Nai Soi	–	19,103	19,311	–	12,252	12,244	11,730	9,725	12,414
Ethiopia	Mai Ayni	–	–	–	15,762	12,255	14,432	15,715	18,207	17,808
Iraq	Makhmour	11,900	10,728	10,912	–	11,101	10,240	10,552	10,534	–
Mozambique	Maratane	5,019	–	–	–	6,646	9,576	7,398	7,707	–
Uganda	Masindi	–	–	55,000	55,000	20,000	6,500	–	–	–
Zambia	Mayukwayukwa	10,636	10,660	10,474	10,184	–	–	10,117	11,366	–
Mauritania	M'bera	–	–	–	–	–	–	–	66,392	48,910
Zambia	Meheba	13,732	13,892	15,763	14,970	–	–	17,708	17,806	8,410
Ethiopia	Melkadida	–	–	–	–	25,491	40,696	42,365	43,480	44,645
Chad	Abgadam	–	–	–	–	–	–	–	21,914	21,571
Ethiopia	Adi Harush	–	–	–	–	6,923	15,982	23,562	25,801	34,090
Uganda	Adjumani	54,051	52,784	21,714	28,000	7,365	–	9,279	11,986	96,926
South Sudan	Ajuong Thok	–	–	–	–	–	–	–	6,691	15,015
Djibouti	Ali Adde	6,739	6,376	8,924	–	14,333	19,500	17,354	17,523	18,208
Uganda	Amuru	–	–	234,000	98,000	35,475	6,779	–	–	–
Ethiopia	Awbarre / Teferiber	–	8,581	11,045	12,293	13,120	13,426	13,331	13,752	12,965
Pakistan	Azakhel	–	25,649	24,258	23,963	26,342	21,398	21,231	21,132	20,191
Jordan	Azraq	–	–	–	–	–	–	–	–	11,315
Pakistan	Badaber	–	36,614	30,327	30,107	31,345	28,729	26,227	25,589	23,918
Nepal	Beldangi 1 & 2	52,997	52,967	50,350	42,122	36,761	33,855	31,976	24,377	18,379
Chad	Belome	–	–	–	–	–	–	–	23,949	26,521
Ethiopia	Bokolmanyo	–	–	–	21,707	14,988	38,501	40,423	41,670	41,665
Ghana	Buduburam	36,159	26,179	14,992	11,334	–	–	–	–	–
Ethiopia	Buramino	–	–	–	–	–	–	35,207	40,114	39,471
Burundi	Bwagiriza				2,896	4,526	6,159	10,105	9,289	9,480
Niger	Abala	–	–	–	–	–	–	11,126	12,216	12,938
Pakistan	Chakdara	–	17,420	16,427	16,069	18,752	13,354	11,242	11,184	10,704
Kenya	Ifo 2, Dadaab	–	–	–	–	–	64,945	69,269	65,693	52,310
Kenya	Kambioos, Dadaab	–	–	–	–	–	10,833	18,126	20,435	21,035
Chad	Dogdore	–	–	–	–	19,500	19,500	19,500	–	–
South Sudan	Doro	–	–	–	–	–	28,709	–	47,422	50,087
Chad	Dosseye	2,277	6,158	8,556	9,607	9,433	9,724	9,922	15,766	21,522
Pakistan	Girdi Jungle	–	29,783	29,717	29,716	31,642	22,740	22,340	22,065	17,376
Nepal	Goldhap	9,602	9,694	8,315	6,356	4,764	–	–	–	–
Burkina Faso	Goudebo	–	–	–	–	–	–	4,943	9,287	9,403
Chad	Goz Amer	19,261	20,097	21,640	21,449	24,608	25,841	27,091	30,105	31,477
Chad	Goz Beïda	–	–	–	–	73,000	73,000	60,500	–	–
Uganda	Gulu	–	–	156,000	44,000	9,043	–	–	–	–
Yemen	Al-Mazrak	–	–	–	–	–	12,075	12,308	12,416	–
Ethiopia	Hilaweyn	–	–	–	–	–	25,747	30,960	37,305	38,890
Ethiopia	Hitsats	–	–	–	–	–	–	–	10,226	33,235
Uganda	Impevi	23,331	22,061	7,453	–	–	–	–	–	–
Niger	Intikane	–	–	–	–	–	–	–	11,221	12,738
Sri Lanka	Jaffna	–	10,522	–	–	9,108	6,436	–	–	–
Pakistan	Jalala	–	16,160	14,115	13,854	16,094	14,042	13,421	13,278	12,968
Ethiopia	Kobe	–	–	–	–	–	26,033	31,656	36,488	39,214
Pakistan	Koga	–	10,766	10,458	9,264	9,183	9,216	8,893	8,738	8,404
Pakistan	Kot Chandna	–	15,130	15,037	15,012	17,787	15,100	14,889	14,664	13,796
Ethiopia	Kule	–	–	–	–	–	–	–	–	46,314
Pakistan	Jalozai	–	83,616	32,155	30,955	100,748	32,499	57,771	22,076	–
Pakistan	Kababian	–	14,729	11,291	12,335	13,214	12,504	12,167	11,664	11,044
Pakistan	Kacha Gari	–	26,721	24,554	28,365	–	–	–	–	–
Zambia	Kala	19,143	16,877	12,768	–	–	–	–	–	–
South Sudan	Kaya	–	–	–	–	–	–	–	18,788	21,918
Uganda	Kyaka II	16,410	18,229	14,750	17,442	–	–	18,055	–	22,616
Ethiopia	Kebribeyah	16,399	16,879	16,132	16,496	16,601	16,408	16,009	15,788	–
Iran	Rafsanjan	12,715	–	–	6,630	6,852	–	–	–	–
Pakistan	Khaki	–	16,267	16,010	15,933	16,221	15,768	14,939	14,698	14,101
Nepal	Khudunabari	13,506	13,226	13,254	12,054	11,067	9,032	–	–	–
Burundi	Kinama	–	–	8,447	9,369			9,480	9,759	9,796
Uganda	Kitgum	–	–	164,000	122,000	12,290	7,070	–	–	–
Rwanda	Kiziba	17,978	18,130	18,323	18,693	18,888	18,919	15,927	–	–
Pakistan	Khairābād-Kund	–	14,674	11,686	11,669	11,839	12,921	12,961	–	–
Uganda	Kyangwali	19,132	20,109	13,434	20,606	–	–	21,280	–	40,023
Guinea	Laine	11,406	5,185	–	–	4,187	–	–	–	–
Ethiopia	Leitchour	–	–	–	–	–	–	–	–	47,711
Botswana	Dukwe	–	–	–	–	–	–	–	–	2,833

== Criticism ==
As head of the International Rescue Committee, David Miliband has advocated for abolishing refugee camps and the accompanying material aid altogether. He argues that given the long duration of many ongoing conflicts, refugees and local economies would be better off if refugees were settled in conventional housing and given work permits, with international financial support both for refugees and local government infrastructure and educational services.

== Unofficial refugee settlements ==
Within countries experiencing large refugee in-migrations, citizen volunteers, non-governmental organizations, and refugees themselves have developed short- and long-term alternatives to official refugee camps established by governments or the UNHCR. Informal camps provide physical shelter and direct service provision but also function as a form of political activism. Alternative forms of migrant settlement include squats, occupations and unofficial camps.

Asylum seekers who have been rejected and refugees without access to state services in Amsterdam worked with other migrants to create the "We are here" movement in 2012. The group set up tents on empty land and occupied empty buildings including a church, office spaces, a garage, and a former hospital. The purpose of these occupations was both for physical housing and to create space for political, cultural, and social communities and events.

In Brussels, Belgium, the speed of refugee processing and the lack of shelters in 2015 resulted in a large number of refugees sleeping in the streets. In response, a group of Belgian citizens and a collective of undocumented migrants built an informal camp in the Maximiliaan park in front of the Foreign Office and provided food, shelter, medical care, schooling, and activities such as a mobile cinema. This camp also functioned as a form of protest through its claims to space and visible location in front of government agencies.

The "Jungle" in Calais, France was an unofficial refugee camp, not legally approved by local or national French authorities. Because the camp did not receive support from the state government or international aid agencies, grassroots organizations were developed to manage food, donations, temporary shelters and toilets, and recreational activities within the camp. Most of the volunteers had not previously been involved in refugee aid work and were not professionals in humanitarian aid. Although filling a need for service provision, the volunteer nature of aid in informal camps resulted in a lack of accountability, reports of volunteers taking advantage of refugees, risks of violence towards volunteers, and a lack of capacity to handle complex situations within the camps such as trafficking, exploitation, and violence. However, volunteer work in the Calais Jungle also functioned as a form of civil disobedience, because working within the camp fell within the definition of Article L622-1 of the French Penal Code, known as the "délit de solidarité" ("crime of solidarity"), which made it illegal to assist the "arrival, movement or residence of persons irregularly present on the French territory".

== See also ==
- Displaced persons camps in post-World War II Europe
- Forced displacement in popular culture
- Homeless shelter
- Human Flow
- Immigration detention
- Lampedusa immigrant reception center
- Refugee children
- Refugee Nation
- Refugee women
- Tent city
- Transitional shelter
- United Nations Border Relief Operation which administered camps in Thailand from 1982 to 1993.
- United Nations High Commissioner for Refugees (UNHCR)
- United Nations Relief and Works Agency for Palestine Refugees in the Near East
