= Katsikas (disambiguation) =

Katsikas may refer to:

== People ==
- Stefanos Katsikas
- Panagiotis Katsikas
- Georgios Katsikas
- Roberto Katsikas

== Places ==
- Katsikas refugee camp
- Katsikas
