= Cishemeye Transit Center =

Former refugee camp in Burundi

Cishemeye Transit Center was a temporary refugee camp in Burundi created by United Nations High Commissioner on Refugees to house refugees who were fleeing from the Kivu in Democratic Republic of Congo.

== Location ==
The center was located in the North-Western Cibitoke province in Burundi, which is 40 kilometers (km) from the Burundi/DRC border.

== History ==
Cishemeye transit center was established in January 2003 by United Nations High Commissioner on Refugees (UNHCR) ) to offer emergency shelter for the refugees fleeing from south Kivu region of Democratic Republic of Congo as a result of the Kivu conflict.

In February 2004, UNHCR started transferring 4465 refugees from Cishemeye transit center to Gasorwe refugee camp security concerns. The refugees where transferred in eight trips using trucks and minibus.

The trip took eight hours, and they made four rest stopover along the way to Gasorwe refugee camp to allow them relax, have a break and stretch their legs. Before refugees departed Cishemeye transit center to Gasorwe refugee camp, they were given items like blankets, pots, pans, soap, kitchen sets, clothes (t-shirts, trousers and shirts), jerry cans and food like bread.

After transferring all the refugees, Cishemeye transit center was closed and the site left bare.

== See also ==
- Kivu Conflict
- Gasorwe refugee camp

== External sources ==
- Burundi - UNCHR - The UN Refugee Agency
