= Jamam =

South Sudan refugee camp

Coordinates: 10°08′15″N 033°15′45″E

Jamam was a refugee camp in Maban County, Upper Nile state, South Sudan.

The inhabitants were moved a few dozen kilometres to the south-east in May 2013 because of the flooding experienced in the Jamam area. The new camp is based around a quarry with better drainage, and is also much closer to the neighbouring camp of Batil, at which Médecins Sans Frontières has built a substantial hospital. The replacement for Jamam is called Kaya — not to be confused with the South Sudanese town of Kaya in the far south of the country.
