= Torbat-e Jam (refugee camp) =

The Torbat-e Jam camp, also called Mehmanshahr, is an Afghan refugee camp (officially termed guest city) in eastern Iran, Torbat-e Jam established around 1998, with a capacity of 10,000 people. The camp, as of 2016, housed 4,000 Afghan refugees on a 100-hectare compound of permanent brick housing, schools and clinics, and a mosque.

Historical population
Year	Pop.	±%
2001	7,000	—
2008	5,000	−28.6%
2016	4,000	−20.0%

United Nations High Commissioner for Refugees António Guterres visited the camp in late 2008 and described it as " probably the best refugee settlement in Iran, if not the world."
