= Rwamwanja Refugee Settlement =

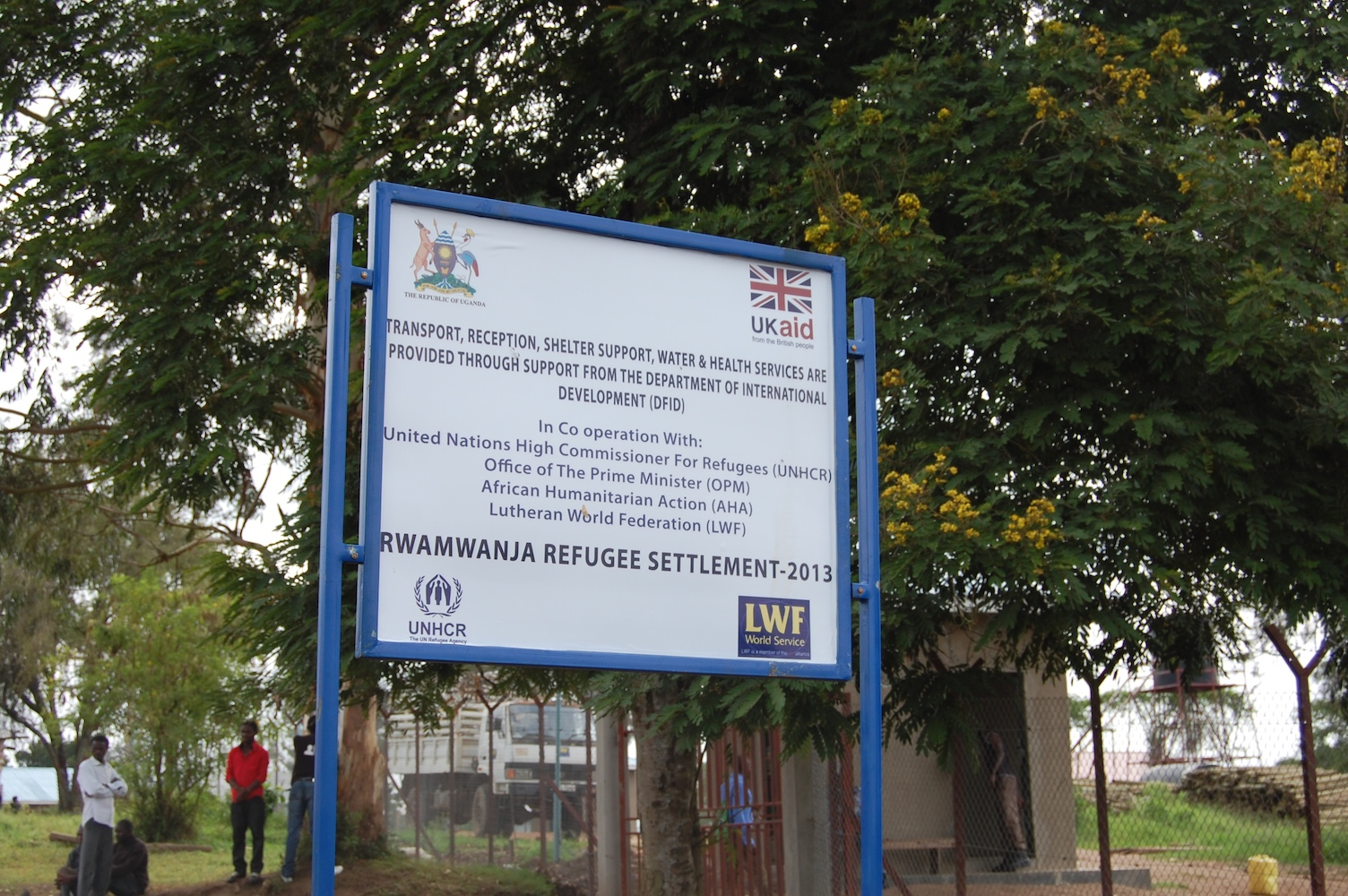

- Location within Uganda
- Coordinates: 0.205°N 30.586°E

Area
  - Total: 127.2 km^{2} (49.1 sq mi)

Population (2015)
  - Total: 69,127
  - Density: 543.5/km^{2} (1,408/sq mi)
- Time zone: UTC+3

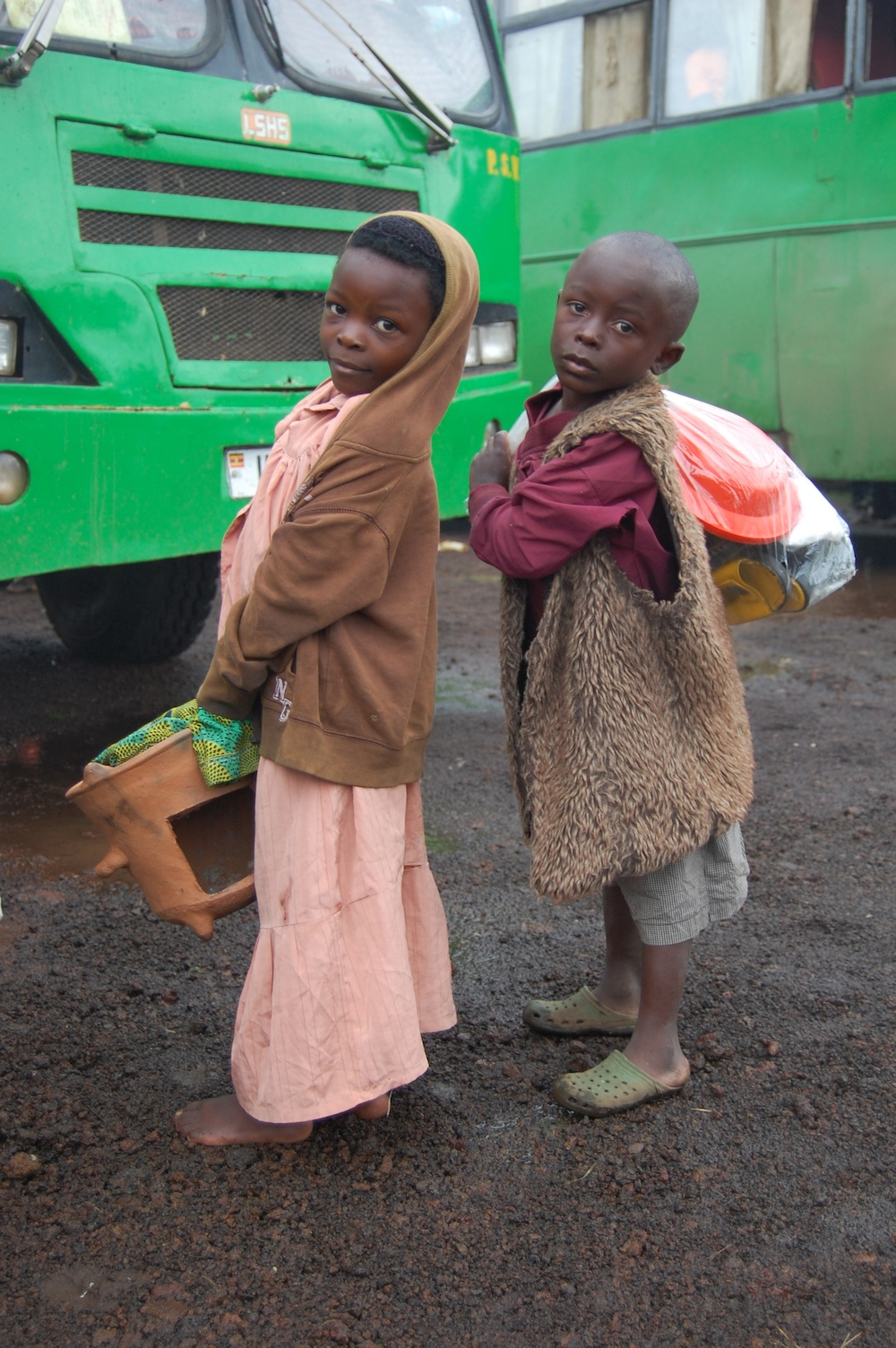
Children are the most vulnerable refugees

Rwamwanja Refugee Settlement is a refugee camp in Kamwenge District in southwestern Uganda and is home to nearly 70,000 refugees.

== History ==
Rwamwanja settlement was established in 1964 to host refugees from Rwanda and closed in 1995.

The Rwamwanja camp is managed by the UNHCR and the Ugandan Office of the Prime Minister's Department of Refugees (OPM). Services to refugees are implemented by a host of "implementing partner" NGOs, principally the Lutheran World Federation, the Windle Charitable Trust, Africa Humanitarian Action and African Initiative for Relief Development.

Most of the current residents of the Rwamwanja settlement are Congolese nationals who fled the M23 rebellion and the broader Kivu conflict beginning in early 2012.

== Social services ==
Accessing land within the Rwamwanja settlement, is 92% where the shelter is located where as 13% of the population access land in a separate plot.

There are more than 280 U-reporters in the settlement, a system that allows refugees and host communities to exchange information in the camp.

Trained to expand their rice and pepper harvests, Congolese refugees in Uganda use earnings to start new businesses and become more self-reliant with the support rendered by the implementing organizations and humanitarian bodies in the Rwamwanja refugee settlement.

There is a building of a 10,000-tree native food forest at the Rwamwanja Refugee Settlement in Uganda. The settlement which houses over 70,000 refugees, most with little food access or employment opportunities is an immediate beneficiary to this long-term project for the benefit of the refugees as well as the Host Community. The food forest will employ refugees, provide healthy food sources, and decrease soil degradation. With a 100-acre piece of land already donated, fundraising for income for the refugee forest workers, tools, and seedlings is underway and on process to see to it that the implementation and success of this is seen and recorded.

== Water and sanitation ==
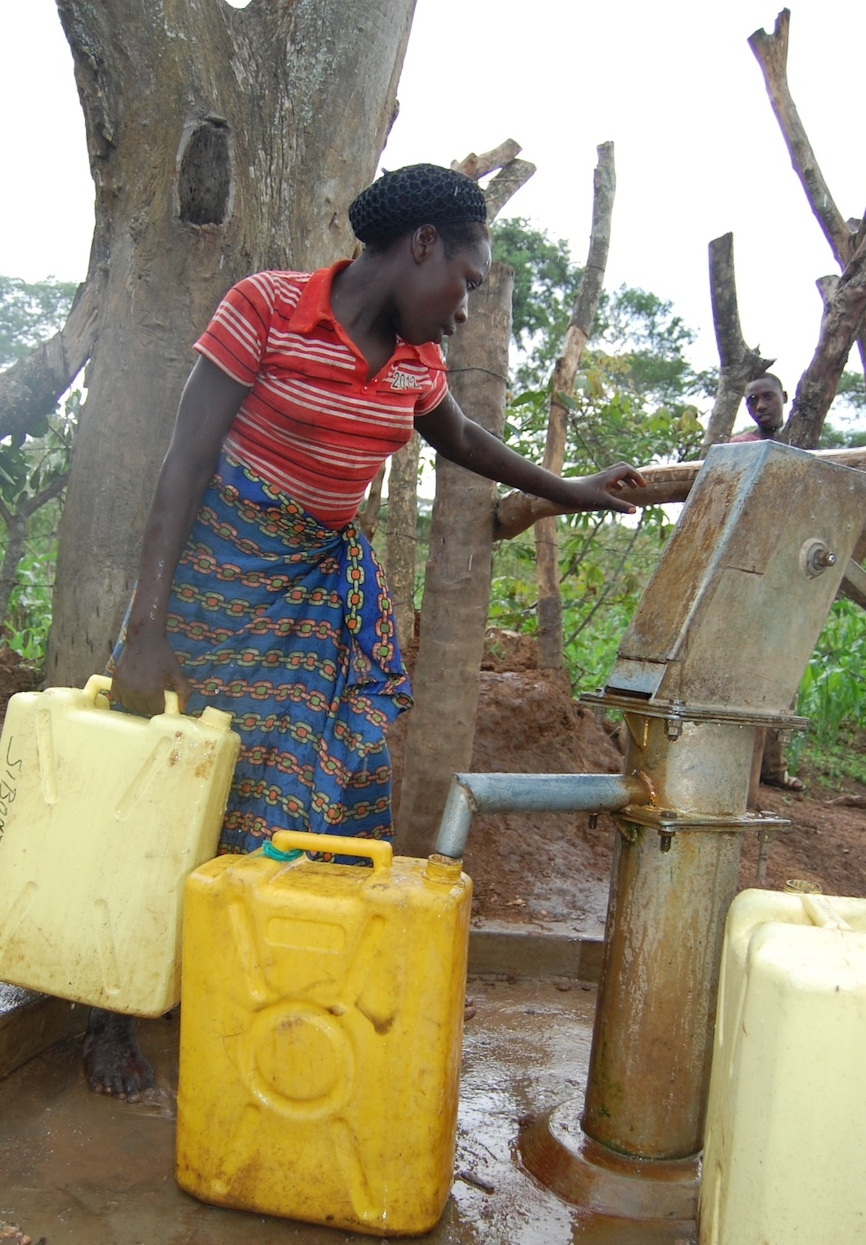
Drilling bore holes

In 2013, Rwamwanja had 55 functional boreholes and shallow wells providing clean and safe water to the refugees.51 of these were installed with handpumps, while 4 are motorized with pipeline distribution to 11 tap stand locations (40 water taps). Water coverage at the end of 2013 was 13 liters per person per day. Rainwater harvesting is also done at all health centers, schools and reception Centers

== Education ==
In 2013, there were 20 early childhood development centers and child friendly spaces that were run by Windle Trust Uganda (WTU) and Save the Children. At the time were 5 primary schools in the settlement, 3 of which are run by UNHCR/WTU: Rwamwanja primary, Mahani primary, Nteziryayo primary and the newest – Kyempango primary and 1 secondary school. UNHCR, through WTU, recruited 100 trained teachers across the settlement. Child rights clubs have been set up in 5 schools in Rwamwanja (Mahani primary, Nteziryayo primary, Rwamwanja primary, Nkoma church of Uganda primary and Rwamwanja secondary) along with Parent Teacher Associations (PTAs) and School Management Committees (SMCs).

8,135 refugee children were enrolled in 2013, giving 77% of the total number of school going age enrolled in primary education.

== Housing and property ==
According to REACH reports, 81% of shelter tenure is owned by the head of the household, 13% owned jointly between household member. 5% rented and 1% owned by neighbors (rent free).

In May 2019, 30% of the households reported owning no property at all out of 70% who do not have access to the property in the refugee camp. This is an indicator that the property owned at the refugee camp at Rwamwanja is closed to and restricted only to Ugandan Host community.
