= Shamshato Refugee Camp =

Coordinates: 33.879636°N 71.711756°E

The Shamshato refugee camp is a large refugee camp 25 kilometers southeast of Peshawar, the capital of Pakistan's Khyber Pakhtunkhwa province. Peshawar lies just east of Pakistan's former Tribal Areas, which are on Pakistan's international border with Afghanistan.

American intelligence analysts asserted during Guantanamo captive Sharifullah's Combatant Status Review Tribunal and his annual Administrative Review Board hearings that his stay in the refugee camp established an "enemy combatant" because they believed recruiters from the Hezb-e-Islami Gulbuddin militia had tried to recruit fighters within the camp. Sharifullah testified that he had been unaware of any militant presence during his stay in the camp.

During his 2005 and 2006, reviews Guantanamo captive Awal Gul faced two allegations concerned with the camp: One; that "the detainee stayed at the Shamshateau refugee camp in Pakistan where he worked closely with his commander." and two: that "The Hezb-e Islami Gulbuddin (HIG) headquarters and operations center was located in Shamshato, near Peshawar, Pakistan."

These allegations were not present during his 2004 Combatant Status Review Tribunal, and were dropped from his third annual review in 2007.

According to the American counter-terrorism think-tank The Jamestown Foundation, the camp is surrounded by a two-meter tall mud-brick wall, and its 2,000 occupants are all loyal to Hekmatyar. The Pakistani newspaper Dawn also reports that the camp is a center of support for Hekmatyar.

Shahabuddin Hekmatyar, the younger brother of Gulbuddin Hekmatyar, the leader of the Hezb-e-Islami Gulbuddin was arrested outside the camp on August 17, 2008.
