= Doro, South Sudan =

Doro
- Village
- Location within South Sudan
- Coordinates: 9°58′45″N 33°45′0″E
- Country: South Sudan
- State: Upper Nile State

Population (2011)
  - Total: 21,500
- Time zone: UTC+2 (CAT)

Doro is a village and a refugee camp in Maban County, Upper Nile State, South Sudan. It was previously a part of Upper Nile state.
