= Maban County =

Maban
- County
- Location in South Sudan
- Coordinates: 9°58′45″N 33°45′0″E
- Country: South Sudan
- State: Upper Nile

Area
  - Total: 11,818 km^{2} (4,563 sq mi)

Population (2017 estimate)
  - Total: 65,117
  - Density: 5.5100/km^{2} (14.271/sq mi)
- Time zone: UTC+2 (CAT)

Greater Maban (which means the people of the land) is a county located in the Upper Nile State of South Sudan. The county capital is the town of Bunj. In 2017, the South Sudan government divided the county into two: North East and South West.

Four rivers flow through the Greater Maban County: the Ahmar, the Yale, the Tombak, and the Yabus. In September 2012, heavy rains and flooding were experienced in the Tombak floodplain.

== Refugee camps ==
There are four refugee camps in the Greater Maban region where 142,500 refugees reside. They are largely occupied by people fleeing armed conflict in Sudan's Blue Nile and South Kordofan states. The largest camps are, from west to east: Kaya (formerly Jamam; moved due to flooding), Yosuf Batil (known locally as Batil), Gendrassa (directly abutting Batil), and Doro (near the town of Bunj). The camps were initially supported by the World Food Programme, through food air drops, but since 2013 the UN Refugee Agency: UNHCR in partnership with NGOs are providing more stable relief services.

In September 2012, a Hepatitis E outbreak was reported in the camps. As of June 2018, the camps hold an estimated 142,500 refugees.
