= Shahabuddin Hekmatyar =

Afghan suspected terrorist (active 1980s– )

Shahabuddin Hekmatyar is the younger brother of Gulbuddin Hekmatyar, the founder of Hezb-e-Islami Gulbuddin. He was captured by Pakistan undercover police on August 17, 2008. The United States classifies Hezb-e-Islami Gulbuddin as a terrorist organization. His capture was near Peshawar, on the road between the Shamshato refugee camp and the "University Town" area in Peshawar. The Asia Times reported the following about his capture by Pakistani security officials:

...[it] appears he was offered up by Pakistan in a desperate effort by NATO to unravel the links between the revival of warlordism in Afghanistan and the Taliban insurgency.

Due to his elder brother being underground, it was Shahabuddin who announced the death of their mother in April 2003.

Pakistani newspaper The News International reported in January 2009 that Shahabuddin had been recently released after six months in Pakistani custody. The paper reported that his younger son, Salahuddin Hekmatyar, had recently been released from Afghan custody, after three years of detention. They reported that, as of 2009, his elder son, Abdullah Shahab, remained in US custody in Bagram.
