= Makeni, Zambia =

Suburb of Lusaka

Makeni is a suburb in Lusaka, Zambia. The Makeni Ecumenical Centre is situated here, providing primary, secondary and adult education courses in a variety of vocational subjects, as well as clinics, family planning services, and an AIDS orphan village.

The origins of the name Makeni are unclear. However the Livingstone Mail reported that in 1914 Major Boyd Cunningham had a farm called Makeni in Lusaka.

A folk etymology has been suggested that the name derives from a Scottish name, McKenny.

Schools include Bayuni School and Makeni Centre Primary School.

It is the home of the Majestic Casino and The Great Wall Chinese Casino.
