= Nakivale Refugee Settlement =

- Location within Uganda
- Coordinates: 0.8°S 30.9°E
- Country: Uganda
- District: Isingiro

Area
  - Total: 185 km^{2} (71 sq mi)

Population (2019)
  - Total: 109,820
  - Density: 594/km^{2} (1,540/sq mi)
- Demonym: Refugees

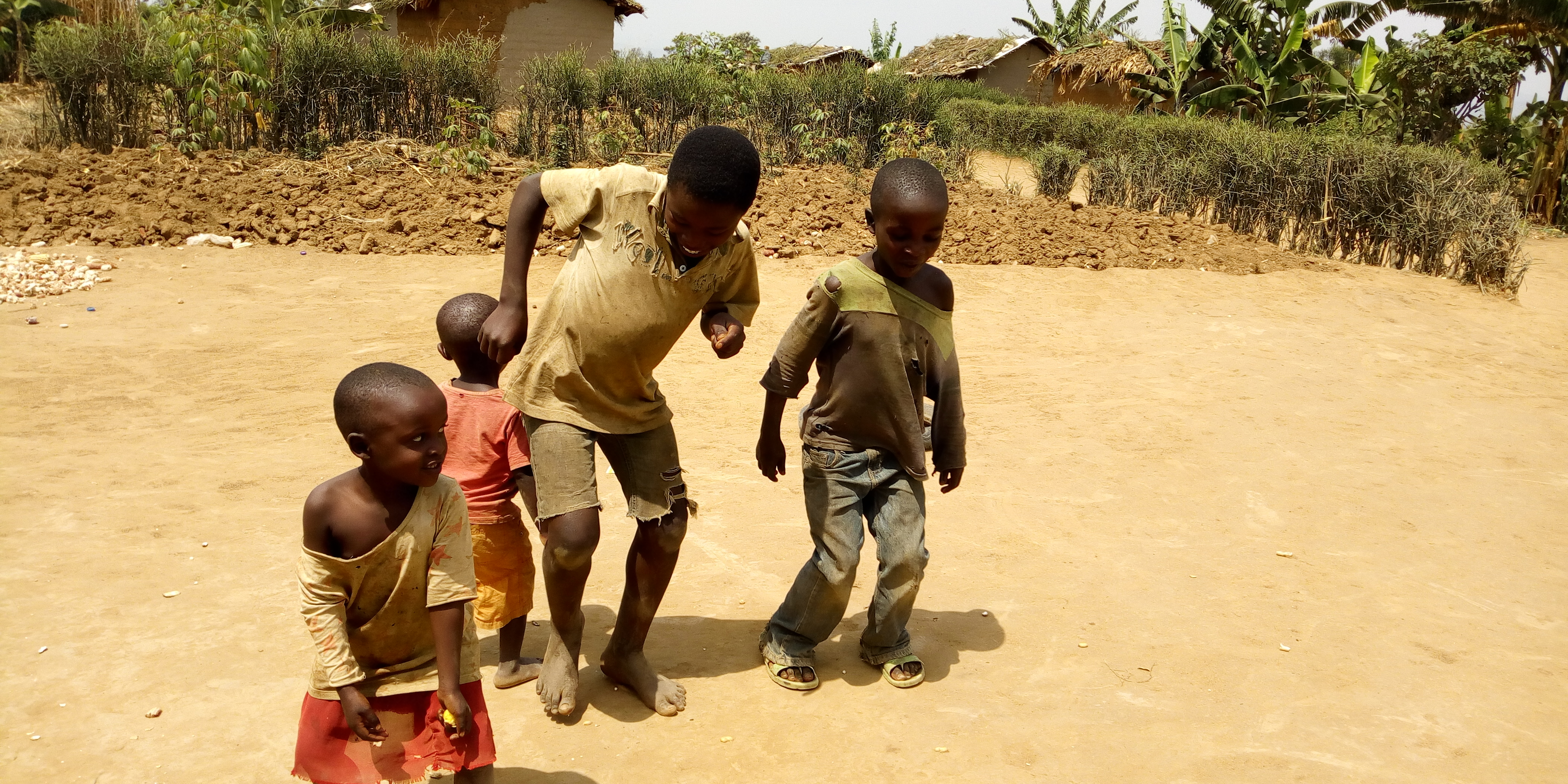
Children in Nakivale refugee camp.

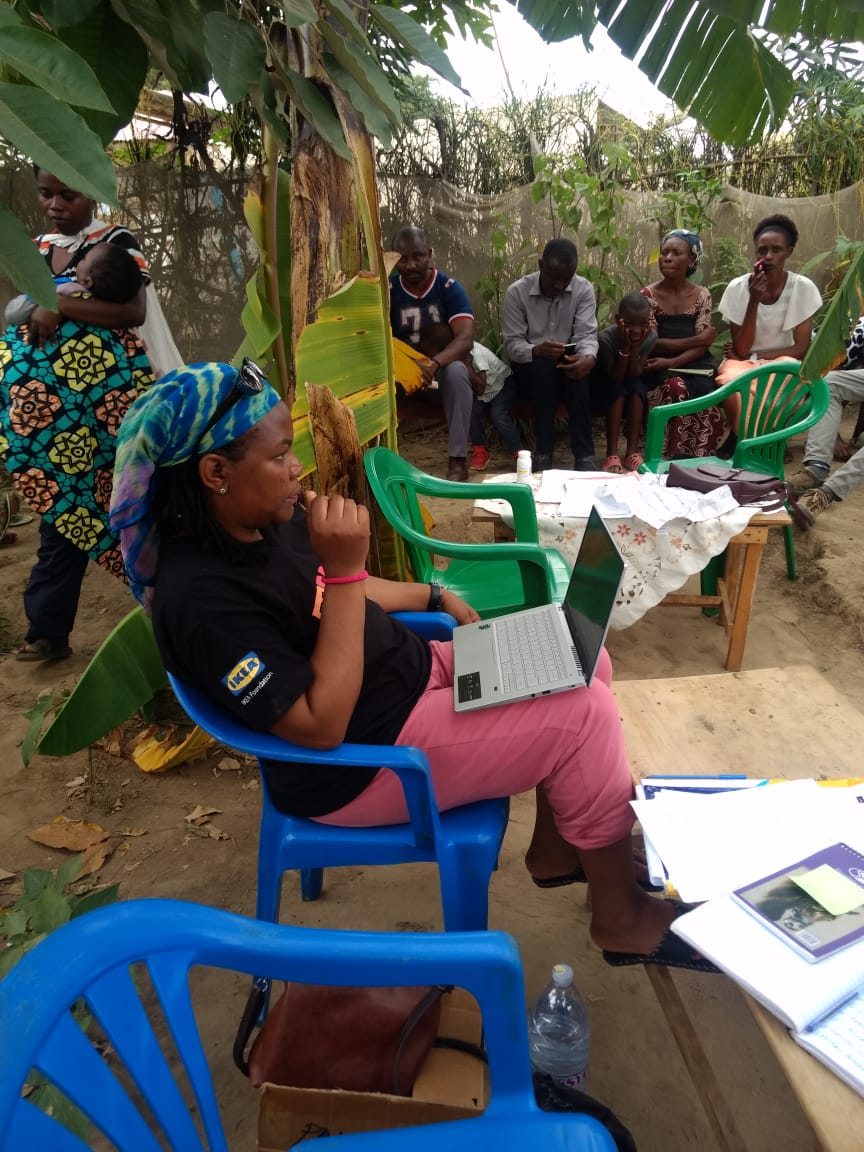
Epilepsy medical outreach in Nakivale Refugee settlement

Nakivale refugee settlement is a settlement located in Isingiro District near the Tanzania border in Southwest Uganda.

== Background ==
Nakivale refugee settlement was established in 1958 and officially recognized as a refugee settlement in 1960 through the Uganda Gazette General Notice No. 19. Nakivale refugee settlement is the 8th largest refugee camp in the world.

Nakivale refugee settlement, is approximately 200 km away from Kampala, Uganda's capital. It is one of the oldest refugee settlements in the Uganda. It is estimated at well beyond 180 square kilometres. This enormous area is geographically divided into three administrative zones – Base camp, Juru and Rubondo. These three zones, in turn, contain a total of 74 individual villages and 51,132 households

It currently hosts 171,387 refugees from the Democratic Republic of Congo, Burundi, Somalia, Rwanda, Ethiopia, and Eritrea. Although many refugees in the area have been living there for several years, recent conflicts in nearby countries are increasing the number of arrivals per day. The majority of refugees in the settlement are Congolese although the population is largely heterogeneous with many cultures and groups from different nationalities. The settlement is divided into 79 villages with an average of 800 to 1,000 people per village.

== Geography ==
It is same geographical size as the Indian city of Kolkata (formerly Calcutta). It is the oldest refugee settlement in Africa, and benefits from what is often lauded as the most progressive refugee policies in the world.

== Location ==
Nakivale refugee settlement is located near the Tanzania border in Isingiro district, Southern Uganda. It is approximately 200 km away from Kampala city, which is the administrative capital of Uganda. The Nakivale refugee settlement is six hours' drive from the capital, Kampala. It stretches for 184 km^{2} (71 sq miles) and covers rolling hills, fertile fields, a lake and many streams. Dotted around the landscape are small brick or mud houses, some with corrugated irons roofs.

== Administration ==
The administration of Nakivale refugee settlement is managed by top level officers from The Office of the Prime Minister on-site settlement management team, led by the Ugandan Settlement Commander. Each zone is officially represented by elected members from the refugee population, who form the settlement's three Refugee Welfare Councils; refugee welfare council one, two and three. The election process is held after two years; this means that each leadership has two years time limit. This is the refugee leadership structure that helps the Office of the Prime Minister to lead refugees at village levels. Each refugee council is composed of 10 members. The chairperson who is in charge of the administration of the village is helped with the vice-chairperson who is most of time a woman. There are also the general secretary, the secretary of defense, the secretary of woman affairs, the secretary of youth, the secretary of extremely vulnerable individuals, the secretary of education, the secretary of hygiene and sanitation and the treasurer. Refugees in Nakivale are granted access to free land to build their shelter and are expected to use the rest for farming. Livelihood assistance is provided by UNHCR IPs, who as of 2013 include the American Refugee Committee, Nsamizi and Wakati Foundation a refugee led organization.

== Implementing partners ==
There are a number of well-established organizations in the settlement working to promote self-reliance and as a result many of its refugees have well-established subsistence agriculture.

The camp had the following implementing partners as of December 2014:

Settlement management, Coordination, and Security: Office of the Prime Minister

Protection: Alight: Humanitarian Aid and Disaster Relief

Community services: Alight: Humanitarian Aid and Disaster Relief, Every Shelter

Education: Windle Trust Uganda, Arise Nursery and Primary School

Health/Nutrition: Medical Teams International

Water/ Sanitation: Nsamizi: Humanitarian Aid and Disaster Relief

Livelihoods & Environment: Nsamizi

Shelter/ Logistics: African Initiative for Relief Development

Advocacy: People for Peace and Defence of Rights

Promotion of refugee artists, youth's and women: Tumaini for Refugee Women, Wakati Foundation

== Operating partners ==
Operating Partners for 2014 include:

Adult Education & Youth Leadership: Finish Refugee Council

Promoting youth's talents, skilling and construction : Best Future Club, PPDR Uganda, Wakati Foundation

Food: WFP through Samaritans’ Purse

GBV intervention: Tumaini for Refugee Women

Child Protection/Tracing: Uganda Red Cross Society

Psychosocial counseling: Tutapona Community

Services/sport: Right to Play and other refugee led organizations

== Sectoral activities ==
=== Protection ===
The protection sector in Nakivale refugee settlement is involved in strengthening protection from crime and reducing or eliminating arbitrary detention, prevention and response to Sexual and Gender Based Violence (SGBV) as well as provision of child protection services to unaccompanied minors/separated children and children at risk. Support is given for durable solutions through individual protection case identification for resettlement and voluntary repatriation activities including information campaigns, "Go See and Come Tell visits" and escorting returning convoys. Nakivale receives an average of 2,000 new asylum seekers in its reception centre every month who await decisions on their refugee status by the Ugandan government Refugee Eligibility Committee which visits the settlement every 3 months.

=== Community services ===
This support includes distribution of non-food items, construction of shelters to persons with specific needs and psychosocial support to vulnerable refugees. Vulnerable groups supported by this sector include the elderly, people with disabilities, single parents, unaccompanied/separated children, as well as other men, elderly persons, women at risk, persons with medical conditions, children at risk and more generally women and children in the settlement. It is also involved in the capacity building of refugee leaders, and mobilising of communities for community works such as building houses, classrooms, water point maintenance and community roads. The sector is also responsible for mobilization for other sector activities including health and WASH and the community mobilization and sensitisation for the celebration of international days such as International Women's Day, World Refugee Day and 16 days of activism.

=== Education ===
By December 2014, there were 9 primary schools and 27 Early Childhood Development Centres in Nakivale along with 1 secondary school and 1 vocational school. Windle Trust Uganda (WTU) also implements the German-funded DAFI scholarship programme which supports tertiary education. Children requiring special education are supported in 2 schools outside the refugee settlement. The Vocational Training Centre (VTC) provides skills training for asylum seekers, refugees and Ugandan nationals to give them the skills necessary for informal employment opportunities and small scale entrepreneurship. Nakivale also hosts a Community Technology Access (CTA) Centre which consists of a training area where students enroll and are trained in basic computer courses and an internet café. Finnish Refugee Council (FRC) provides training in Adult Literacy, English for Adults and related life skills through 36 learning centres across the settlement.

=== Health ===
Health services provided include Out-Patient Department services, community outreach activities such as immunization, sensitization and mobilization for antenatal care (ANC) and systems strengthening. There are 4 health centres in Nakivale (one grade III and three grade II H/Cs). Main referral point is Mbarara RRH and Rwekubo H/C IV. MTI intervenes and also supports awareness messages on HIV/AIDS, other communicable diseases, health promotion campaigns, and capacity building of Community Health Workers. As a result, there has been an improvement in ANC attendances, maternal child health and family planning response. All indicators in morbidity and mortality are also within standard. Most common diseases within the settlement are Malaria and Respiratory Tract Infections. The Global Acute Malnutrition (GAM) for Nakivale in 2013 was 2.9% (with critical being more than 15%) and Severe Acute Malnutrition rate was negligible (critical = 5%).

=== Water and sanitation ===
There is an estimated population of over 35,000 nationals surrounding the Refugee Settlement who directly benefit from water, education, health and nutrition programmes in the settlement. UNHCR and the government of Uganda fund and monitor the implementation of sub-projects activities and interfaces with implementing partners involved in providing social service like Windle International Uganda for education. The settlement hosts communities from Democratic Republic of Congo, Burundi, Somalia, Rwanda, Eritrea, and Ethiopia.

Refugees in Nakivale settlement receive both underground water (through boreholes and shallow wells) and surface water pumped from Lake Nakivale and treated at one of 3 water plants in the settlement (Base camp, Misiera and Kabazaana). There are 50 hand pumps and 318 water taps in the settlement. Water trucking (in schools and health centres) is also used during the dry season and rain water harvesting during the wet season. The sanitation sector is involved in hygiene promotion in communities and institutions. Latrine coverage in 2013 was 87%.

=== Livelihoods and environment ===
The main livelihood activities include food crop production (including mushroom growing inside houses), crop post-harvest handling (mainly for maize), livestock husbandry, small businesses and vocational skills (tailoring, soap making, bakery and crafts/sandal making), making energy efficient stoves that use less firewood and making charcoal out of household waste. A total of 2,590 energy saving stoves have been constructed in the settlement through community participation led by a refugee led organization: WAKATI Foundation.

WAKATI Foundation as part of promoting and supporting small holder associations, beneficiary households have also been organized refugees into groups/associations. In order to promote conservation and stop deforestation tree-planting and energy saving technologies have been introduced.

=== Resettlement ===
Nakivale is the main settlement for resettlement cases due to its size and the length of stay of many of its refugees. The focus is on individual protection cases and Congolese refugees for durable solutions. Additionally, follow-up and counseling is provided for the Somali refugees whose cases were submitted between 2009 and 2011 and still pending. In 2013, UNHCR referred 999 individuals from Nakivale and 1,763 individuals departed. In 2013, resettlement submissions from Nakivale are expected to continue increasing significantly with a main focus on Congolese refugees.

== See also ==
- Isingiro District
- United Nations High Commissioner for Refugees
- The Office of the Prime Minister
