= Mae Ra Moe refugee camp =

Karen refugee camp

Mae Ra Moe refugee camp, also called Mae Ra Ma Luang or Mae Ra Mu, is a Karen refugee camp in the Sob Moei District, Mae Hong Son Province, Thailand on the Border of Burma, established in 1995.

Mae Ra Moe (MRM) is located on the Thai/Burma border, five hours drive west of Chiang Mai, Thailand. Driving distance from Mae Sariang is 2.5 hours, depending on season and road conditions. It's advisable, typically necessary, to travel to MRM via 4x4 vehicle. Access is granted by permit only (authorized by the Thai government and the Karen Refugee Committee / KRC).

Mae Ra Moe is home to approximately 12,000 Karen refugees from Karen State in Myanmar. There are now two high schools at MRM - High School No. (1) and Karen Adventist Academy (KAA). There are approximately 1,000 students attending each high school.

This camp has a Karen Young Women Leadership School (KYWLS) | and boarding houses for Burmese children.

In August 2011, it was badly affected by flooding and landslides.

Other Karen refugee camps in Thailand on the Border of Burma are: Mae La Camp; Umpiem Camp; Nupo Camp; Mae La Oon Camp; Mae Ra Ma Luang; Tham Hin Camp.
