= Osire =

Refugee camp in Namibia

Coordinates: 21°04′23″S 17°21′59″E

Osire is a refugee camp in central Namibia, situated 200 km north of the capital Windhoek next to the main road C30 from Gobabis to Otjiwarongo. It was established in 1992 to accommodate refugees from Angola, Burundi, the Democratic Republic of the Congo, Rwanda and Somalia. The camp grew quickly in its early years, reaching a peak of 20,000 inhabitants in 1998. Since then the refugee population of Osire decreased steadily, approaching 6,500 in 2010, and 3,000 in 2014. Camp numbers rose sharply again with the Western DR Congo clashes.

The camp used to be a detention centre during the South African rule over Namibian territory. Early in its existence as refugee camp maltreatment of inhabitants, retaliation, harassment and riots were reported. In 2009 a group of 41 people fled the camp with the help of a local Human Rights organisation after allegedly having received death threats. This group left Namibia via the Mamuno Border Post but was refused entry to Botswana and as a result stayed in No Man's Land between Namibia and Botswana for three months until being arrested by Botswana authorities and deported to the Democratic Republic of the Congo.

Today, however, UNHCR regards the camp as one of the best managed in the world, due to its provisioning of formal school education, with 39.6% of refugees completing secondary schooling. The settlement further has a police station and a clinic administered by the Ministry of Health and Social Services and meeting the national standards. The Ministry of Home Affairs and Immigration oversees technical aspects of the settlement, where 60% of homes have electricity and 40% have internet access. African Humanitarian Action supports the health sector, food distribution, community services and. World Food Program supports the general food ration and the supplementary feeding program in the camp. Over 40% of all households own small kitchen gardens on which they group local vegetables for sale and own consumption. The most serious threats facing residents are from climate change and cuts to the UNHCR and USAID budgets.
