= Breidjing Camp =

The Breidjing Camp within Chad.

The Breidjing refugee camp is a camp located in eastern Chad created by the UNHCR and run by the Red Cross, which eventually hosted around 42,000 Sudanese refugees who fled Darfur, Sudan in 2004 after the start of a long armed conflict. This camp was still operating as of 2025.

== Origins ==
In February 2003, two rebel groups in Sudan accused the Sudanese government of oppressing the country's non-Arab population. The Sudanese government decided to respond to these accusations with a campaign of religious cleansing against the non-Arab population of Darfur. This resulted in the total death of two and a half million people. That's why many non-Arab families had to flee Darfur to various refugee camps. But more and more Sudanese refugees were arriving in Chad, which is why UNHCR and NGOs such as the Red Cross and Oxfam International saw it necessary to create camps to accommodate them. One of these camps was the Breidjing camp that was developed that same year, at the beginning of the conflict, to accommodate the hundreds of thousands of people who came from Sudan. The camp was located in the neighboring country of Sudan, Chad, located just one kilometer from the village of Breidjing, which had approximately 960 inhabitants.

== Inhabitants ==
The inhabitants of the Breidjing camp are families who were persecuted by the militia or who feared for their lives and therefore decided to leave their country for neighboring countries. The refugees who went to live in the countryside had to escape their country quickly, many of them in the middle of the night without having time to take anything. Therefore, most of the refugees in these camps depended heavily on the aid provided by the humanitarian workers of the Red Cross and UNHCR. When the camp began to be inhabited in 2004, there were approximately 2,000 men compared to 8,000 women and about 20,000 boys and girls, over the years these numbers have fluctuated.

== Life ==
The camp was organized on an esplanade one kilometer from the town, designed to accommodate around 30,000 people. The population of the camp quickly increased to over 43,000, with many residents living in makeshift shelters of tree branches and plastic. Overcrowding and lack of water contributed to several riots at the camp in 2004, and the temporary withdrawal of humanitarian workers. The United Nations High Commissioner for Refugees express serious concerns about large numbers of Sudanese men and boys within the camp being forcibly recruited by rebel groups to fight in the conflict. They reported that in one weekend in March 2006, alone as many as 4,700 men and boys had been taken from the camp to border regions near the conflict, the majority against their will.

The camp suffered problems with resources such as water, food, firewood, tents, etc. A large part of the country's population was starving and there was a lack of drinking water, apart from that many animals died from lack of food. As their bodies decomposed they brought disease and polluted the water. It was increasingly difficult to find shelter and food due to the overpopulation of the countryside. NGOs such as Oxfam focussed on providing sources of fresh water for those living in the camp. Usually once a month on the last two days food was distributed in the camp, there were two distribution stations where the refugees could get a ration of food, but as the population grew the amount of food had to increase to be able to feed all the refugees, which required effort by the NGOs. The boys and girls in the countryside also had educational services and activities provided by the NGOs. The government of Chad has made the schools that were created in the camps part of the public school system in order to be able to recognize the degrees obtained in the camp.
