= Katsikas refugee camp =

Refugee and immigrant camp in Epirus, Greece

Katsikas refugee camp, officially termed Katsikas facility of temporary reception by the Greek government, is an operation unit under the Greek Ministry of Migration and Asylum for the hosting and temporary reception of immigrants and refugees in Greece. It is located in the municipal community of Katsikas of the municipality of Ioannina in the Ioannina regional unit of Epirus Region. The National Public Health Organization, the Ministry of Education, the Greek Military and aid agencies "ASB Greece" and "Metadrasi" operate in the camp.

== Camp management ==
Katsikas camp is the largest refugee and migrant camp in Epirus. The camp's director is businessman Dimitris Lakkas. The management teams of the refugee camps in Epirus (Katsikas, Fillipiada, Doliana) have been provided support by ASB since February 2018.

In December 2020 the camp hosted around 1300 individuals, at an overall capacity of 1450 persons.

== Riots ==
On 14 December 2020 there was conflict between police forces, including Greek riot police squads, and camp residents due to the arrival of around 150 new refugees to be hosted at the camp. Witnesses speak of violence, use of tear gas and gunshots in the air, while the Greek Police has not issued an announcement about the incident.

The tension was caused by the inevitable crowding of the existing prefabricated housing units in order to accommodate the additional individuals who had been transferred to the camp from Athens, Serres and other places in Greece. Two individuals already residing in the camp refused to move, resulting in a case file being established against them.
