= Languages of South Asia =

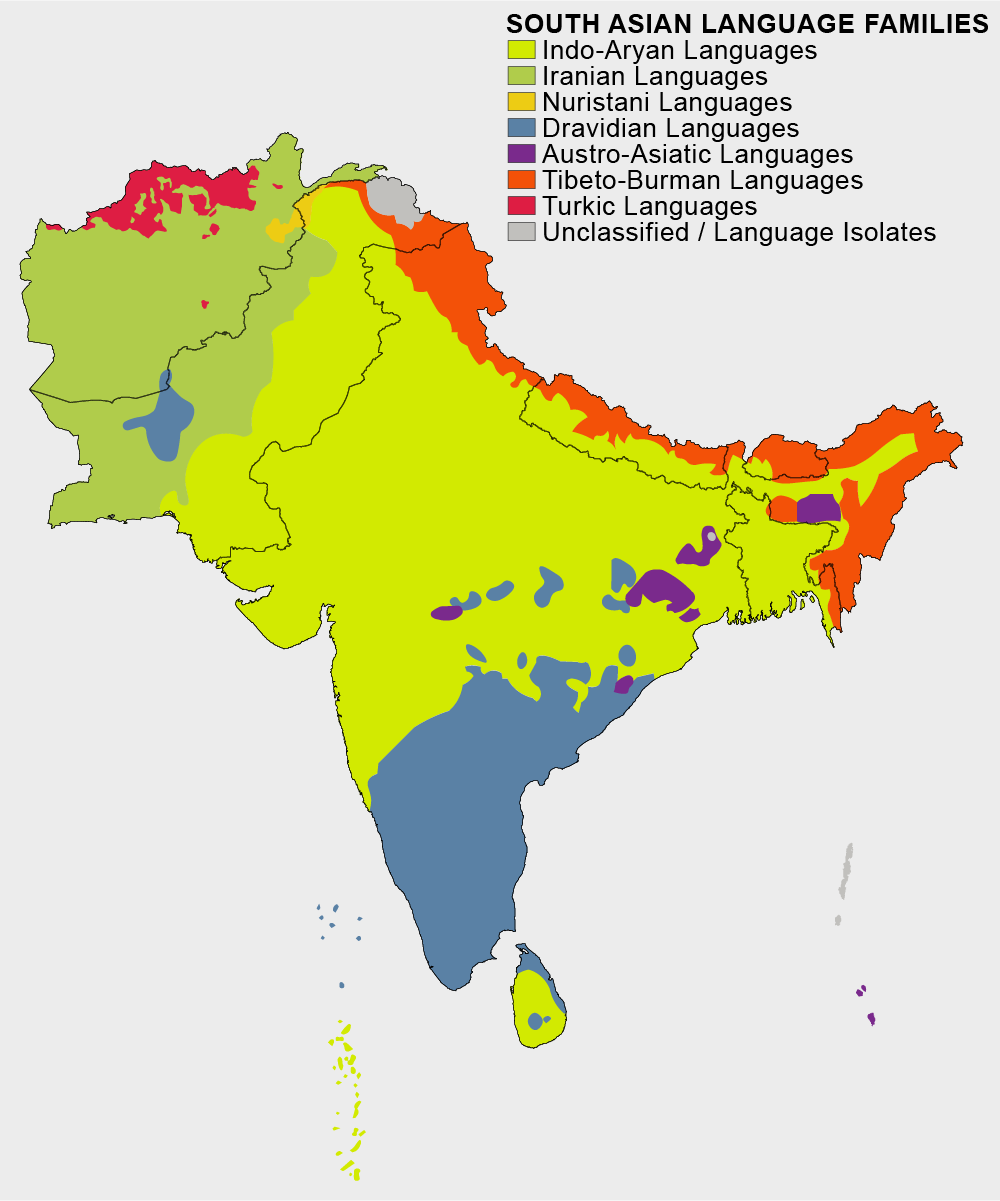
Map of language families in South Asia.

South Asia is home to several hundred languages, spanning the countries of Afghanistan, Bangladesh, Bhutan, India, the Maldives, Nepal, Pakistan, and Sri Lanka. It is home to the third most spoken language in the world, Hindi–Urdu; the seventh most spoken language, Bengali; and thirteenth most spoken language, Punjabi. (Note: combining both western and eastern Punjabi) Languages like Bengali, Tamil and Nepali have official/national status in more than one country of this region. The languages in the region mostly comprise Indo-Iranic and Dravidian languages, and further members of other language families like Austroasiatic, and Tibeto-Burman languages.

== Geographical distribution ==
Geolinguistically, the Indo-Aryan, Dravidian and Munda language groups are predominantly distributed across the Indian subcontinent. The term Indic languages is also used to refer to these languages, though it may be narrowed to refer only to Indo-Aryan and Dravidian languages.

The subcontinent is also home to a few language isolates, like Burushaski, Kusunda, Nihali, and Vedda.

Areally, the influence of the languages extend beyond the subcontinent into other neighbouring Southern Asian as well as East and Southeast Asian regions, and the extended linguistic area is known as Indosphere. Narrowly, the sprachbund of Indic languages and other geopolitically neighbouring languages is known as South Asian languages (which includes Eastern-Iranic and Nuristani languages; Central- and Western- Tibeto-Burman linkages; and Khasic languages).

The Iranian Plateau, located west of the subcontinent, is home to Iranic languages, beginning with Pashto of Pashtunistan and Balochi of Balochistan in the eastern-side of the plateau. Persian is spoken in the central plateau, with varieties like Dari in Afghanistan, Farsi in Iran and Tajik in Tajikistan. Pamir languages are spoken in the Pamir Mountains, located to the north of Hindu Kush and Karakoram ranges. Kafiri languages are spoken in pockets at the northern intersection of the plateau and the subcontinent.

Tibeto-Burman languages (of the Trans-Himalayan family) are spoken in and beyond the regions of the Himalayan and Indo-Burman Ranges, predominantly on the Tibetan Plateau and Burma.

Also beginning at the Indo-Burman Ranges, Khasi–Palaungic languages (of the Austroasiatic family) and Northwestern Tai languages (of the Kra–Dai family) are spoken in the Southeast Asian Massif.

Great Andamanese languages and Ongan languages are spoken on the Andaman Islands.

The enigma Bhutanese and Arunachali languages like Hrusish, Puroik, Koro, Digarish, Gongduk etc, which were long assumed to be Sino-Tibetan languages due to proximity, may actually be language isolates. Some still consider them to be really divergent Sino Tibetan languages with heavy substrata influences and archaic Proto Sino Tibetan retentions.

== Lingua francas ==
A movie poster featuring the title in Devanagari, Urdu, and Roman scripts, which are typically associated with the four historical lingua francas of the subcontinent (Sanskrit/Hindustani, Persian, and English)

Historically, Sanskrit was the lingua franca of South Asia. In the Indo-Muslim period, Persian became a connecting language throughout much of India and the Persianate world in general, influencing local languages. Arabic also acted as a formal language of trade in the south like in the Maldives and Keralam. From the colonial era onwards, English became a lingua franca to some extent, aiding those who participated in the Indian independence movement, for example.

In contemporary times, English is considered the international lingua franca of the South Asian countries. Since the colonial era, the South Asian languages have absorbed significant influences from the English language, with the most-spoken South Asian language Hindustani also acquiring a new English-influenced variant known as Hinglish which is spoken more in urban areas. There are other English-South Asian fusion languages such as Tanglish and Tenglish.

On a subregional level, Telugu was a language of high culture in South India in precolonial times, while in modern times, Punjabi and Bengali function as major transnational languages connecting the northwestern and eastern regions of India to Pakistan and Bangladesh, respectively (see also Punjabiyat).

== By country ==
=== Afghanistan ===
The official languages of Afghanistan are Pashto and Dari (Farsi), both of which are Iranic languages. Dari, an Afghan standardised register of the Persian language, is considered the lingua franca of Afghanistan and used to write Afghan literature. Tajik is spoken by people closer to Tajikistan, although officially, is regarded as a regional dialect of Dari. Pashto is widely spoken by the Pashtun people, who mainly reside towards the south of Afghanistan on the Pakistani-Afghan border. A few Turkic languages, like Uzbek and Turkmen, are spoken near regions closer to Uzbekistan and Turkmenistan. Balochi is spoken in southern part of the country, primarily bordering areas of Sistan Baluchistan and Balochistan, Pakistan.

=== Bangladesh ===
The national language of Bangladesh is Bengali. Standard Bengali based on the Central dialect is used for all official purposes. The majority of Bangladeshis speak an eastern variant of Bengali language. Some ethnic minority indigenous groups also speak Tibeto-Burman, some other Indo-European languages, Dravidian and Austroasiatic languages.

=== Bhutan ===
Dzongkha is the national language of the Kingdom of Bhutan. Other languages spoken include Brokpa, Dzala, Chali Chocangacakha, Dakpa language, Khengkha language, Nepali language, Gongduk, Nyenkha, Lhokpu, Takpa and Tshangla.

Almost all the languages of Bhutan are from the Tibetic family (except Nepali, an Indo-Aryan language).

=== India ===
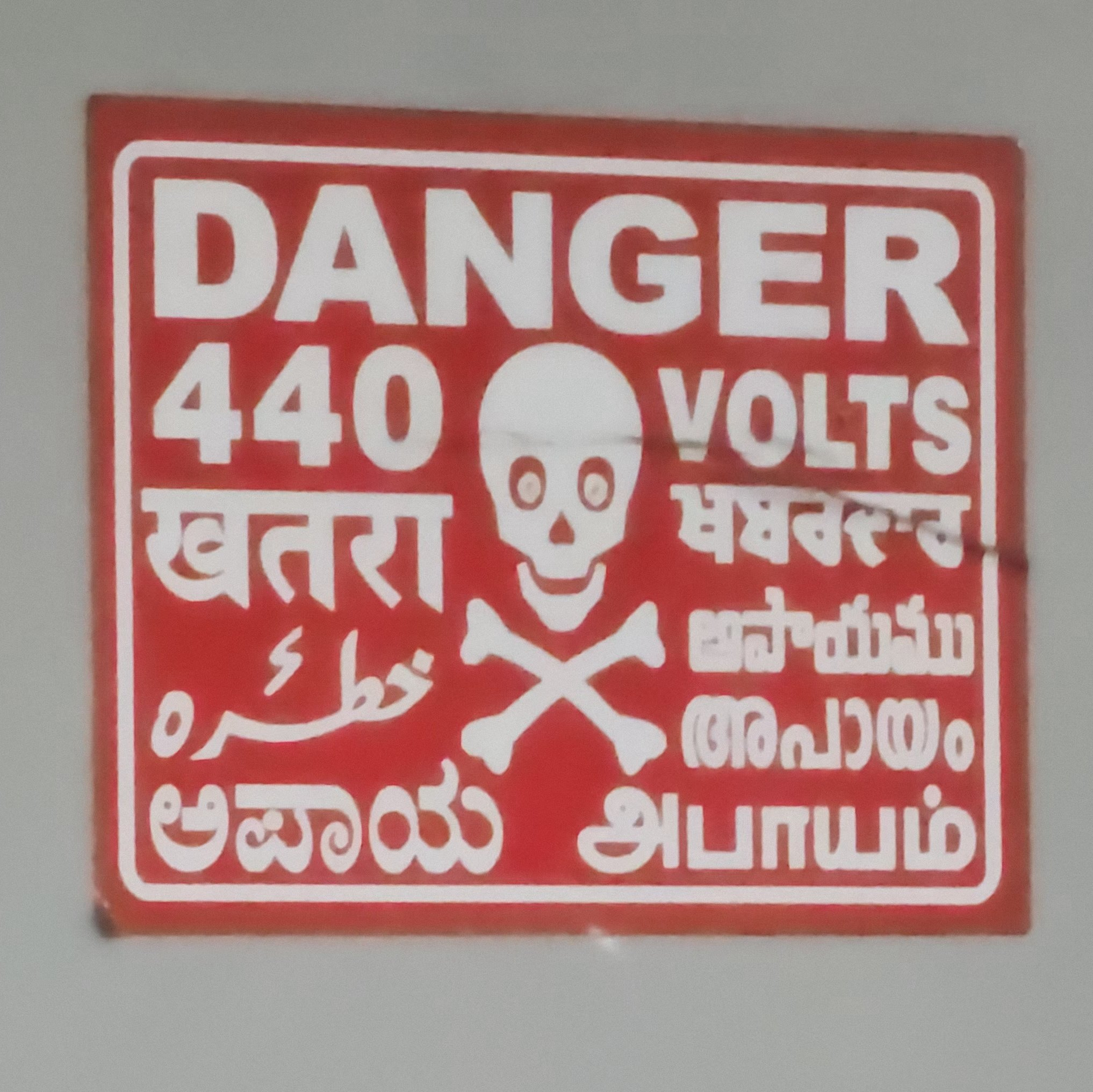
A danger sign in India containing eight languages, all using different scripts.

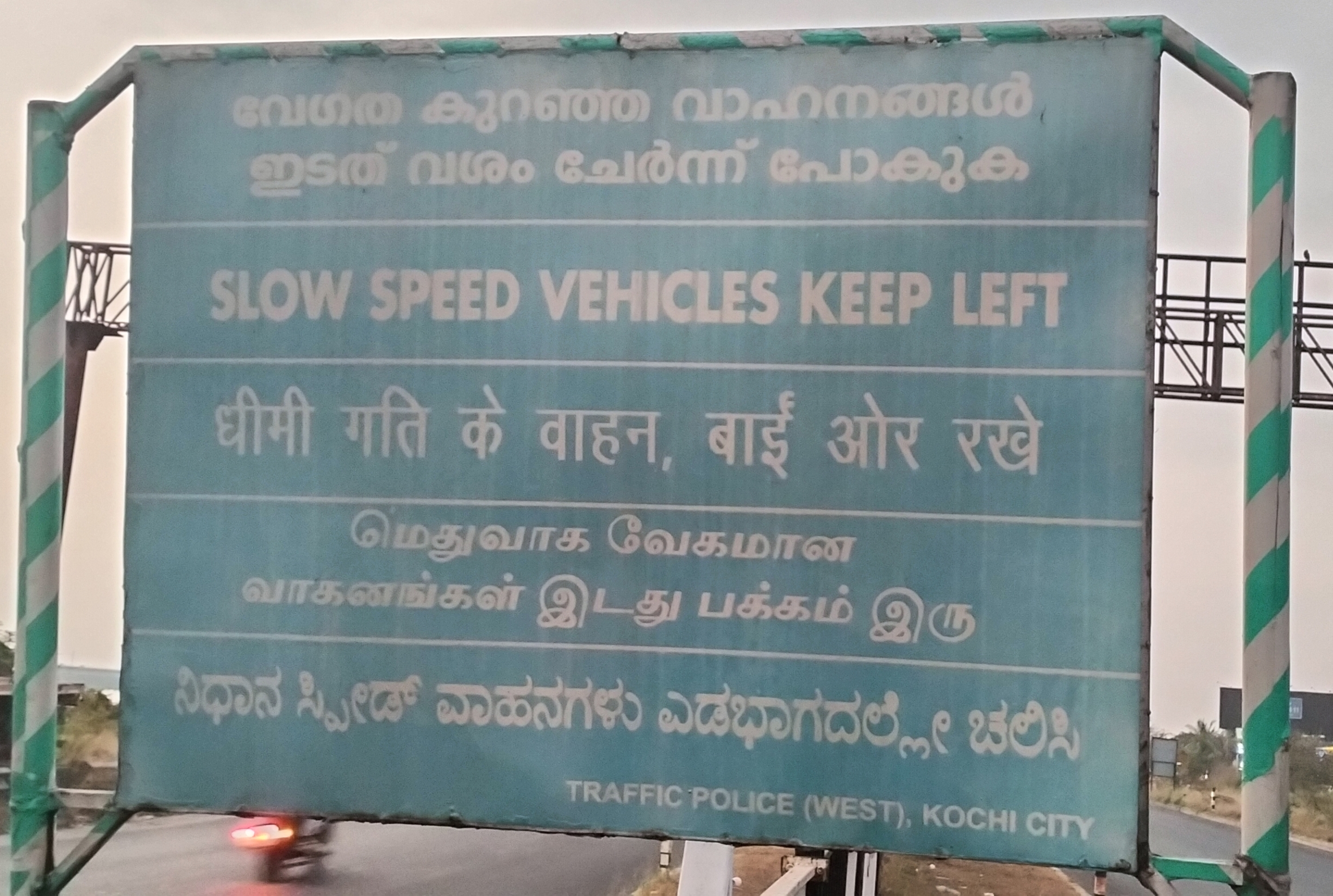
A pentalingual highway sign in Kochi written in Malayalam, English, Hindi, Tamil and Kannada.

Most languages spoken in the Republic of India belong either to the Indo-Aryan (c. 74%), the Dravidian (c. 24%), the Austroasiatic (Munda, Khasic, Nicobarese) (c. 1.2%), or the Tibeto-Burman (c. 0.6%) families, with some languages of the Himalayas still unclassified. The SIL Ethnologue lists 461 living languages for the Indian Republic.

Hindustani is the most widespread language of India. The Indian census takes the widest possible definition of "Hindi" as the broad variety of the Hindi languages. The native speakers of Hindi so defined account for 39% of Indians. Bengali is the second most spoken language in the subcontinent, found in both Bangladesh and Indian states of West Bengal, Tripura and Assam. The International Mother Language Day was created by UNESCO to commemorate the Bengali language. Sanskrit is a highly used Dharmic liturgical language, made co-official in 2 states. Other notable languages include Odia, Telugu, Punjabi, Marathi, Tamil, Urdu, Sindhi, Kannada, Pashto, Malayalam, Maithili, Meitei (Manipuri), Konkani, and Tulu.

Thirteen languages account for more than 1% of Indian population each, and between themselves for over 95%; all of them are the "scheduled languages of the Constitution".

Scheduled languages spoken by less than 1% of Indians are Santali (0.64%), Meitei (Manipuri) (0.14%), Bodo (0.13%), Dogri (0.01%, spoken in Jammu and Kashmir). The largest language that is not "scheduled" is Bhili (0.95%), followed by Gondi (0.27%), Tulu (0.17%) and Kurukh (0.099%)

The languages of the Andaman Islands form another group:

- the Great Andamanese languages, comprising a number of extinct, and one highly endangered language Aka-Jeru.
- the Ongan family of the southern Andaman Islands, comprising two extant languages, Önge and Jarawa, and one extinct language, Jangil.

Sentinelese is thought likely to be related to the above languages.

In addition, the Ahom language, a Southwestern Tai language, had been once the dominant language of the Ahom Kingdom in modern-day Assam, but was later replaced by the Assamese. Some Kra Dai languages are still spoken like Tai Phake, Tai Aiton and Tai Khamti.

A Bantu language, Sidi, was spoken until the mid-20th century in Gujarat by the Siddi. There are some isolates like Nihali and Burushaski.

The enigma Arunachali languages like Hrusish, Puroik, Koro, Digarish etc, which were long assumed to be Sino-Tibetan languages due to proximity, may actually be language isolates. Some still consider them to be really divergent Sino Tibetan languages with heavy substrata influences and archaic Proto Sino Tibetan retentions.

=== Maldives ===
Divehi is the national language of the Maldives, spoken by 95% of the population. Arabic is considered as the religious language, and English is medium of instruction for education and international purposes such as tourism.

=== Nepal ===
Most of the languages of Nepal either fall under Indo-Aryan languages or Sino-Tibetan languages. The official language of the country is Nepali, earlier known as Gorkhali in the Kingdom of Nepal, which is part of the Indo-Aryan group and is the spoken by majority of the population.

The Indo-Aryan languages spoken in Nepal include Maithili language, Bhojpuri language and Tharu language, which constitutes majority of the speakers in southern Nepal in the Terai region. The Sino-Tibetan languages include Tamang, Newari, Magar language, Gurung language, Kiranti languages and Sherpa language and are often spoken in central and northern Nepal in the hilly and mountainous regions.

=== Pakistan ===
Pakistan is a linguistically diverse country; it has many dozens of languages spoken as first languages. The major languages of Pakistan broadly fall under the category Indo-Iranian languages, with western regions of Pakistan (on the Iranian Plateau) speaking Iranic languages, and eastern regions (situated on the subcontinent) speaking Indo-Aryan languages; with the Indus River approximately dividing the families.

Other language families in Pakistan include Dravidian (Brahui spoken in Central Balochistan), Sino-Tibetan languages such as Balti and Purgi spoken in the north-east (In Baltistan region of Pakistan), Nuristani languages such as Kamkata-vari spoken in the north-west (In chitral region of Pakistan), Language isolate Burushaski spoken in the north (In Gilgit Division), Turkic languages are also spoken in Pakistan, by Kyrgyz native and migrant families in the North and Uzbeks and Turkmen in Khyber Pakhtunkhwa and by refugees from Afghanistan; and Uyghur refugees from China.

The lingua franca in Pakistan is Urdu, a Persianised register of the Hindustani language. The most-widely spoken first language in the country is Punjabi, spoken by the Punjabi people, forming a majority in the Punjab province and Islamabad Capital Territory. Punjabi is followed by Pashto, Sindhi, Saraiki, (Note: Seen by many as a variety of Punjabi) Hindko, Pahari-Pothwari, Urdu, and Balochi; while more than 70 other languages like Shina, Balti, Dari, Bengali, Kohistani languages etc. are also spoken.

=== Sri Lanka ===
Sinhala and Tamil are the official languages of Sri Lanka, with English as the link language. Tamil is a South-Dravidian language, and Sinhala belongs to the Insular Indic family (along with Dhivehi of the Maldives). Vedda is said to be an indigenous language of Sri Lanka that existed prior to the arrival of the Indo-Aryan and Dravidian speakers.

== See also ==
- Languages of Asia
- Languages of Bangladesh
- Languages of Bhutan
- Languages of India
  - Languages with official status in India
  - List of languages by number of native speakers in India
- Languages of Maldives
- Languages of Nepal
- Languages of Pakistan
- Languages of Sri Lanka
- Indosphere

== Citations ==
- "Indian Language Family". Central Institute of Indian Languages. Archived from the original on 15 June 2002.
- Data table of Census of India, 2001
- SCHEDULED LANGUAGES IN DESCENDING ORDER OF SPEAKERS' STRENGTH – 2001
- COMPARATIVE RANKING OF SCHEDULED LANGUAGES IN DESCENDING ORDER OF SPEAKERS' STRENGTH-1971, 1981, 1991 AND 2001
- Census data on Languages
