= Nupbi language =

East Bodish language of central Bhutan

Nupbikha
- Region: Bhutan
- Native speakers: 2,200 (2006)
- Language family: Sino-Tibetan: (Tibeto-Burman); Tibeto-Kanauri; Bodish; East Bodish; Nupbikha
- Writing system: Tibetan script

Language codes
- ISO 639-3: npb
- Glottolog: nupb1238
- ELP: Nupbikha

The Nupbi language (Dzongkha: nupba'i kha "Western language") is an East Bodish language spoken by about 2200 people in central Bhutan.

Historically, Nupbikha and its speakers have had close contact with speakers of Bumthang, Kurtöp and Kheng, nearby languages of central and eastern Bhutan, to the extent that they may be considered part of a wider collection of "Bumthang languages." The Nyen language, also related to the Bumthang languages, is more divergent, while the 'Ole language ("Black Mountain Monpa") is only distantly related.

== See also ==
- Languages of Bhutan
