= Kheng people =

Kheng
Total population
- 50,000+

Regions with significant populations
- Central Bhutan (Zhemgang, Trongsa, Mongar, Bumthang District), Dagana District

Languages
- Kheng or Bumthangkha, Dzongkha

Religion
- Buddhism, Bon

Related ethnic groups
- Ngalop, Sharchops

The Kheng people are found primarily in the Zhemgang, Trongsa, Bumthang, Dagana, and Mongar Districts of central Bhutan. They speak the Kheng language, a member of the extended Sino-Tibetan language family belonging to the East Bodish language group; it is mutually intelligible with the Bumthang language and Kurtöp language to the north. The Kheng people are ethnolinguistically same as the Bumthang people and Kurtöp people of central Bhutan. The Kheng people are indigenous populations of south central Bhutan. Linguist and ethnographer Dr. Tim Bodt notes that the people of Kheng, Bumthang, Kurtöe and Trongsa Mangdue have a deep, indigenous history in Bhutan. Archaeological evidence and linguistic timelines suggest that the people of Kheng, Bumthang, Kurtöe and Trongsa Mangdue have inhabited the central valleys and rugged landscapes of the country for more than 4000 years. SIL International estimates there are 50,000 Kheng speakers as of 2009.

The Kheng people are devout followers of Tibetan Buddhism, particularly of the Nyingma tradition. Before the arrival of buddhism, the Kheng people practiced the ancient Bon religion—a tradition rooted in shamanism and animism. Even today, a few Kheng elders preserve these ancient practices.

Kheng people are known for secular and religious noble families such as numerous Dung families who had small fiefdoms until the 17th century.

== See also ==
- Ethnic groups in Bhutan
- Kheng language
- Bumthang language
