= Bumthang people =

Bumthangpa
Total population
- 30,000+

Regions with significant populations
- Central Bhutan (Bumthang, Trongsa, Kurtoe or Lhuntse, and Zhemgang)

Languages
- Bumthangkha or Khengkha, Dzongkha

Religion
- Buddhism, Bon

Related ethnic groups
- Kheng, Ngalop, Sharchops

The Bumthangpa or Bumthang people are an ethnic group of central Bhutan primarily living in the four main valleys, namely Ura, Chumey, Tang and Choekhor in Bumthang district. They speak the Bumthangkha or Bumthang language, a member of the extended Sino-Tibetan language family. It is mutually intelligible with the Kheng language to the south and also to some extent with the Kurtöp language to the north. Linguist van Driem postulated that Khengkha, Bumthangkha, and Kurtöpkha are dialects of what he calls "a single Greater Bumthang" language.

Bumthangpa are ethnolinguistically same as the Kheng people and Kurtöp people of central Bhutan. They are devoted followers of Tibetan Buddhism and the Nyingma tradition is widely practised across the region. A renowned 14th century Buddhist saint, Pema Lingpa, was born in Bumthang. Similarly, there are a number of secular and religious noble families, of which the Dung family is the oldest.

== See also ==
- Ethnic groups in Bhutan
- Bumthang language
- Kheng language
