= Bumthang =

Bumthang may refer to:

- Bumthang District, a district in Bhutan
- Bumthang River, a river in Bhutan
- Bumthang people, an ethnic group living in central Bhutan
- Bumthang language, an East Bodish language spoken in Bhutan
- Bumthang Province, a historic province of Bhutan
- Bumthang Valley, a valley in the Bumthang district
- Jakar, a town, also known as Bumthang, in Bhutan
- Kingdom of Bumthang, a historic kingdom located in modern-day Bhutan
