= Gongdu =

Gongdu may refer to:

- Gongdu language (དགོང་འདུས་) - an endangered language of eastern Bhutan named after Gongdue Gewog
- Gongdu Gewog (དགོང་འདུས་) - a division of Mongar District in Bhutan
- The Chinese writer and poet Huang Zunxian (1848–1905) - Courtesy name Gongdu (公度)
