= Kheng =

Kheng may refer to:

- Kheng people, people of Bhutan
- Kheng language, the Bodish language of the Kheng people
- Benjamin Kheng (born 1990), Singaporean actor and singer
- Lork Kheng (born 1955), Cambodian politician
- Narelle Kheng (born 1993), Singaporean actress and singer
