= Chali language =

Bodish language spoken in Bhutan

Chali
- ཚ་ལི་ཁ, Tsha-li-kha
- Native to: Bhutan
- Native speakers: 1,500 (2011)
- Language family: Sino-Tibetan: Tibeto-Burman; Tibeto-Kanauri (?); Bodish; East Bodish; Chali
- Writing system: Tibetan script

Language codes
- ISO 639-3: tgf
- Glottolog: chal1267
- ELP: Chalikha

Chali (Dzongkha: ཚ་ལི་ཁ་; Wylie: Tsha-li-kha; also called Chalikha, Chalipkha, Tshali, and Tshalingpa) is an East Bodish language spoken by about 1,398 people in Wangmakhar, Gorsum and Tormazhong villages in Mongar District in eastern Bhutan, mainly around Chhali Gewog on east bank of Kuri Chhu River. Chalikha is related to Bumthangkha and Kurtöpkha.

== See also ==
- Languages of Bhutan
