= Gongduk language =

Endangered Sino-Tibetan language of Bhutan

Gongduk
- དགོང་འདུས་ Gongdukpa Ang
- Native to: Bhutan
- Region: Mongar District
- Native speakers: 2,000 (2006)
- Language family: Sino-Tibetan: Gongduk
- Writing system: Tibetan script

Language codes
- ISO 639-3: goe
- Glottolog: gong1251
- ELP: Gongduk
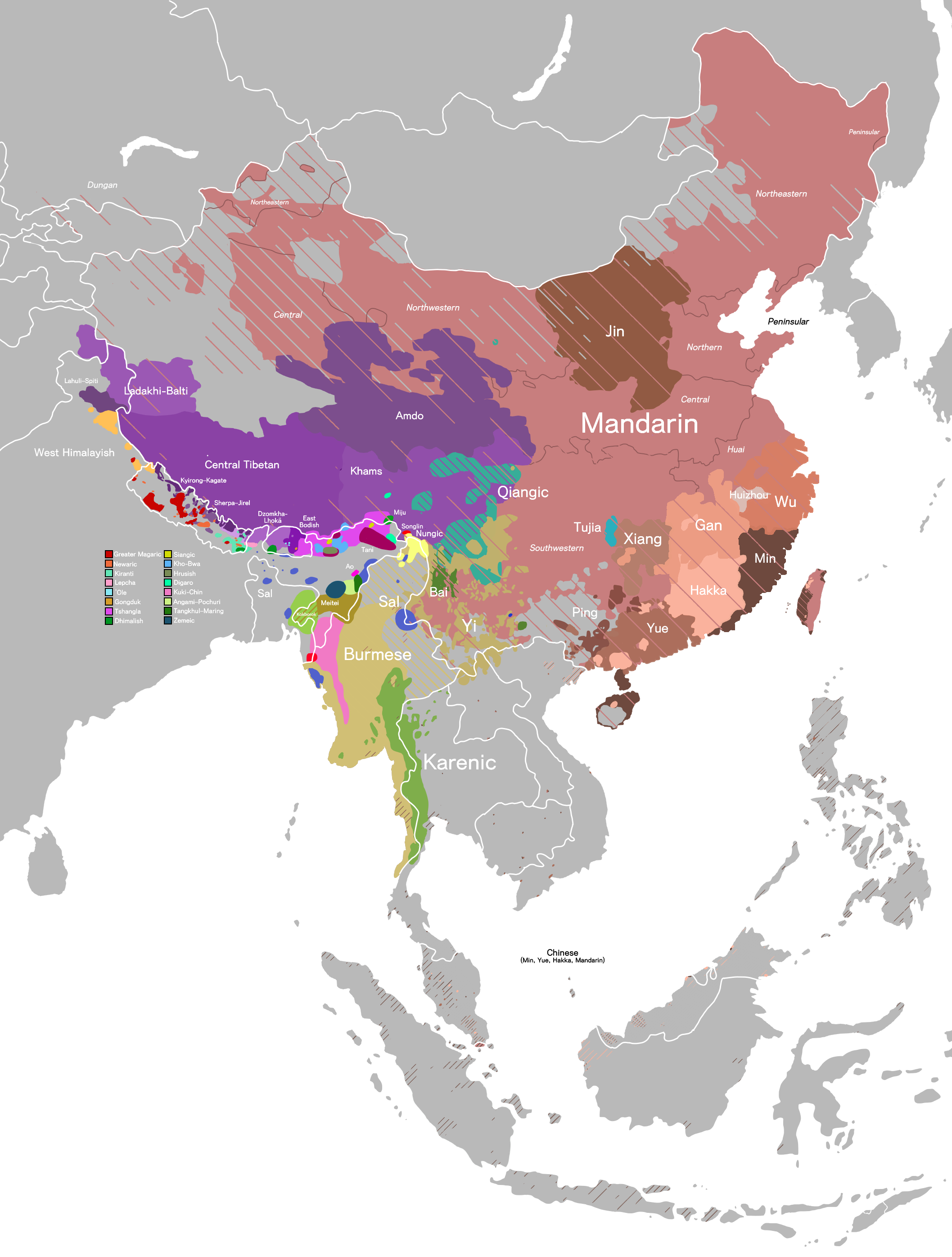
- Gongduk

Gongduk or Gongdu (Tibetan: དགོང་འདུས་, Wylie: Dgong-'dus) is an endangered Sino-Tibetan language spoken by about 1,000 people in a few inaccessible villages located near the Kuri Chhu river in the Gongdue Gewog of Mongar District in eastern Bhutan. The names of the villages are Bala, Dagsa, Damkhar, Pam, Pangthang, and Yangbari (Ethnologue).

== History ==
The language was only formally described by linguists in 1991. As of 2012, George van Driem is working towards the completion of a description of Gongduk based on his work with native speakers in the Gongduk area.

== Classification ==
Gongduk has complex verbal morphology, which Ethnologue considers a retention from Proto-Tibeto-Burman, and is lexically highly divergent. On this basis, it is apparently not part of any major subgroup and will probably have to be assigned to its own branch.

George van Driem (2001:870) proposes that the Greater Bumthang (East Bodish) languages, including Bumthang, Khengkha, and Kurtöp, may have a Gongduk substratum. Gongduk itself may also have a non-Tibeto-Burman substrate.

Gerber (2018) notes that Gongduk has had extensive contact with Black Mountain Mönpa. Gongduk also has many Tshangla loanwords. The following comparative vocabulary table from Gerber (2020) compares Gongduk, Black Mountain Mönpa, and Bjokapakha, which is a divergent Tshangla variety.

Gloss	Gongduk	Black Mountain Mönpa	Bjokapakha
hair (on head)	θɤm	guluŋ	tsham
tongue	dəli	líː	lɪ
eye	mik	mek ~ mik	miŋ
ear	nərəŋ	naktaŋ	nabali
tooth	ɤn	áː ~ waː	sha
bone	rukɤŋ	ɦɤtphok ~ yöphok	khaŋ
blood	winiʔ	kɔk	yi
hand/arm	gur	lɤk ~ lok	gadaŋ
leg/foot	bidɤʔ	dɤkpɛŋ ~ tɛ̤kɛŋ	bitiŋ
faeces	ki	cok	khɨ
water	dɤŋli	cö, khe	ri
rain	wɤ	ghö	ŋamtsu
dog	oki	cüla ~ khula	khu
pig	don	pɔk	phakpa
fish	kuŋwə	nye̤	ŋa
louse	dɤr	θæːk	shiŋ
bear	bekpələ	wɤm ~ wom	omsha
son	ledə	bæθaː	za
daughter	medə	bæmɛt	zamin
name	kət	mön ~ min	mɨŋ
house	kiŋ	mhiː̤ ~ mhe̤ː	phai
fire	mi	áːmik ~ áːmit	mɨ
to hear	lə yu-	goː-	nai tha-
to see	tɤŋ-	tuŋ-	thoŋ-
to look	məl- ~ mɤt-	mak-	got-
to sit	mi- ~ mu-	buŋ- ~ bæŋ-	laŋ-
to die	komθ-	θɛː- ~ θɛʔ-	shi-
to kill	tɤt-	θüt- ~ θut- ~ θit	she-

Comparison of numerals:
Gloss	Gongduk	Black Mountain Mönpa	Bjokapakha
one	ti	tɛk	thur
two	niktsə	nhü	ɲiktsiŋ
three	towə	sam	sam
four	piyə	blö	pshi
five	ŋəwə	lɔŋ	ŋa
six	kukpə	o̤ːk	khuŋ
seven	ðukpə	nyí	zum
eight	yitpə	jit [ʤit]	yɪn
nine	guwə	doːga	gu
ten	deyə	chö	se

Comparison of pronouns:
Pronoun	Gongduk	Black Mountain Mönpa	Bjokapakha
1SG	ðə	kö	jaŋ
2SG	gi	iŋ	nan
3SG	gon	hoʔma (MASC); hoʔmet (FEM)	dan
1PL	ðiŋ	ɔŋdat (INCL); anak (EXCL)	ai
2PL	giŋ	iŋnak	nai
3PL	gonmət	hoʔoŋ	dai

== Phonology ==
Consonants
		Labial	Dental	Retroflex	Palatal	Velar	Glottal
Plosive	oral	p b	t d	(ʈ) (ɖ)		k g	ʔ
Plosive	aspirated	pʰ	tʰ	(ʈʰ)		kʰ	
Affricate	oral		ts (dz)		tɕ dʑ		
Affricate	aspirated		(tsʰ)		tɕʰ		
Fricative			θ ð		ɕʲ		h
Nasal		m	n			ŋ	
Approximant		w	r, l		j		

- Consonants in parentheses are only found in loanwords.
- The velar stops /kʰ k g/ are in free variation with their uvular counterparts [qʰ q ɢ].
- The stops /p t k/ are glottalised and unreleased [ʔp̚ ʔt̚ ʔk̚] at the end of syllables.
- /ŋ/ can often be heard as a glottal stop [ʔ] in fast speech or following another nasal.
- /n/ and /ŋ/ are palatalized to [ɲ] before /i/ or /j/.

Vowels
	Front		Central	Back
	Unrounded	Rounded	Central	Back
High	i	(y)		u
Mid	e	(ø)	ɤ	o
Low	(ɛ)		ə	(ɔ)

- /y/ and /ø/ most often appear after palatal consonants and in loanwords.
- /ɛ/ and /ɔ/ may be in free variation with /e o/.
- /ə/ can often be heard as [ɐ~ɑ].
- /ɤ/ varies broadly between [ɨ~ɯ~ɤ~ɘ~ə].

== Grammar ==
=== Morphology ===
Gongduk has productive suffixal morphology (van Driem 2014).

-məˀtⁿ ‘plural suffix in human nouns’

Examples:

- oloˀŋməˀtⁿ ‘children’ < oloˀk ‘child’ + -məˀtⁿ
- ŋidɤməˀtⁿ ‘people’ < ŋidɤ ‘person’ + -məˀtⁿ
- aroˀŋməˀtⁿ ‘friends’ < aroˀk ‘friend’ + -məˀtⁿ

However, non-human plural nouns do not take on any suffixes, and remain the same:

- kurtə ‘horse, horses’
- kəitɤ ‘bird, birds’
- kiŋ ‘house, houses’

-e ~ -ðe ~ -θe ‘ergative and possessive suffix’

Examples:

- bɤʔlɤpə-e ‘the people of Bɤʔlɤ [ergative]’
- choŋnən-ðe me ‘the seed of the maize’
- nor-θe taɦ ‘meat of the cow [beef]’
- rek-θe rukɤŋ ‘head bone [skull]’
- aroʔk-te-θe ‘the friend [ergative]’
- əp drəkpə-e ‘Ap Drakpa [ergative]’
- θok-θe əkəm ‘egg of offering (sacrificial egg)’
- lei-ti-ðe juʔmə ‘after one month’

-gi ‘ablative suffix’

Examples:

- ðiŋ goŋduʔ-gi əna ‘We are from Gongduk’
- nikkələŋ-gi ‘by way of the stairs’
- dəkθə-gi ‘from Daksa’
- kidu-gi ‘as a kidu [government gift]’
- bɤʔlɤ-gi ‘from Bɤʔlɤ’
- deŋkəle wɤŋ-gi ‘from Dengkalé Dale’
- doʔmoŋ-gi ‘from "Black Roof" village’
- phəjoŋ pəm-gi ‘from Phajong Pam’

-gu ~ -go ~ -ku ~-ko ‘dative / locative suffix’

Examples:

- gərəŋ-go ‘to whom’
- ohaŋ duʔ-gu ‘in that village’
- rek-ko ‘to [his] head’
- ðə-go ‘to me’
- jə-go ‘to India’
- gaoŋ-go ‘whereto, where precisely’
- pəkpək-ko ‘at times, sometimes’
- thimphu-gu ‘to Thimphu’

=== Demonstratives ===
Gongduk demonstratives precede head nouns.

ohaŋ ‘that (demonstrative)’

Examples:

- ohaŋ ŋidɤ ‘that person’
- ohaŋ koŋ ‘that tree’
- ohaŋ duʔgu ‘in that village’

=== Personal pronouns ===
Personal pronoun paradigm
		absolutive		ergative & genitive	
		singular	plural	singular	plural
1st person	exclusive	ðə	ðiŋ	ðe	ðiŋ, ðiŋ ŋəŋpoe
1st person	inclusive	ðə	iθi, iθirəŋ gəŋpo	ðe	dei, dei gəŋpoe
2nd person		gi	giŋ	gi	giŋ, giŋ ŋəŋpoe
3rd person		gon	gonmə	gonðe	gonməe, gonma ŋəŋpoe

Van Driem (2014) compares the Gongduk first person singular personal pronoun ðə 'I, me' to Kathmandu Newar dʑiː ~ dʑĩ- 'I, me' and Tshangla dʑaŋ ~ dʑi- ~ dʑiŋ- 'I, me'. He also compares the Gongduk first person plural personal pronoun ðiŋ 'we, us' to Kathmandu Newar dʑʰai ~ dʑʰĩ- 'we, us'.

== Vocabulary ==
The Gongduk words and phrases below are from van Driem (2014).

=== Basic vocabulary ===
- rek ‘head’
- rukɤŋ ‘bone’
- əŋ ‘language, mouth’
- dɤŋli ‘water’
- wɤ ‘rain’
- yər ‘cliff’
- dɤ ‘salt’
- ɤn ‘tooth’
- koŋ ‘tree’
- diŋ ‘wood’
- me ‘seed’
- dola ‘cooked Setaria or rice’
- choŋnən ‘maize’
- ɤwɤ ‘banana’
- taɦ ‘meat’
- wərə ‘highland paddy, ghaiyā’
- khərəŋ ‘cooked Panicum or maize’
- don ‘pig’
- nor ‘cow’
- kurtə ‘horse’
- kəitɤ ‘bird’
- əkəm ‘egg’
- jə ‘day (24-hour period)’
- lei ‘month’
- oloʔk ‘child’
- ŋidɤ ‘person’
- aroʔk ‘friend’
- duʔ ‘village’
- kiŋ ‘house’
- nikkələŋ ‘stairs’
- θok ‘offering’
- goŋduʔ ‘Gongduk’

=== Numerals ===
- ti ‘1’
- niktsə ‘2’
- towə ‘3’
- diyə, piyə ‘4’
- ŋəwə ‘5’
- qukpə ‘6’
- ðukpə ‘7’
- yitpə, hetpə ‘8’
- ɢuwə ‘9’
- deyə ‘10’
- deθəti ‘11’
- deθəniktsə ‘12’
- deθətowə ‘13’
- khəe ‘score (20)’
- khəe ŋəwə ‘five score, i.e. one hundred’

=== Interrogative pronouns ===
- gərəŋ ‘who’
- gərəe ‘whose’
- θəpo ‘what’
- ko ‘when’
- gaoŋ ‘where, whither’
- qəti ‘how much, how many’
- gainəŋ ‘which, whence’
- qətigu ‘at what time’
- θəu, θəudi ‘why, how come’
- gora, gorapəm ‘how, in which way’
- ohaŋ ‘that (demonstrative)’

== See also ==
- Gongdue

== Bibliography ==
- Dzongkha Development Authority; Dasho Sangay Dorji; Col. Wangdi Tshering; Namgay Thinley; Gyembo Dorji; Phuntsho Wangdi; Lekyi Tshering; Sangay Phuntsho (2005). དགོང་འདུས་རྫོང་ཁ་ཨིན་སྐད་ཤན་སྦྱར་ཚིག་མཛོད། (Gongduk-Dzongkha-English Dictionary). Thimphu: Dzongkha Development Authority. p. 115. ISBN 99936-663-1-9.
- Gerber, Pascal. 2019. Gongduk agreement morphology in functional and diachronic perspective. Paper presented at the ISBS Inaugural Conference, Magdalen College, University of Oxford.
- van Driem, George L; et al. (Karma Tshering of Gaselô) (1998). Dzongkha. Languages of the Greater Himalayan Region. Leiden: Research School CNWS, School of Asian, African, and Amerindian Studies. pp. 32–33. ISBN 90-5789-002-X.
- van Driem, George L (2007). "Endangered languages of Bhutan and Sikkim". In Brenzinger, Matthias (ed.). Language diversity endangered. Trends in linguistics. Studies and monographs. Walter de Gruyter. pp. 314–15. ISBN 978-3-11-017050-4.
- van Driem, George. 2014. Gongduk Nominal Morphology and the phylogenetic position of Gongduk. Paper presented at the 20th Himalayan Languages Symposium, Nanyang Technological University, Singapore, 16 July 2014.
