= Chochangachakha language =

Sino-Tibetan language spoken in Bhutan

Chocha Ngacha
- Tsamang
- Region: Bhutan
- Native speakers: (20,000 cited 1993)
- Language family: Sino-Tibetan: Tibeto-Kanauri ?; Bodish; Tibetic; Dzongkha–Lhokä; Chocha Ngacha
- Writing system: Tibetan alphabet

Language codes
- ISO 639-3: cgk
- Glottolog: choc1275
- ELP: Chocangacakha

The Chocha Ngacha language or Chochangachakha (Dzongkha: ཁྱོད་ཅ་ང་ཅ་ཁ་ Wylie: Khyod ca nga ca kha "'You' and 'I' language"; also called "Kursmad-kha", "Maphekha", "rTsamangpa'i kha", and "Tsagkaglingpa'i kha") or Tsamang is a Southern Tibetic language spoken by about 20,000 people in the Kurichu Valley of Lhuntse and Mongar Districts in eastern Bhutan.

== Chocha Ngacha and Dzongkha ==
Chocha Ngacha is a "sister language" to Dzongkha.

the most closely related language to Dzongkha in the kingdom is spoken in the east of the country along the Kurichu and represents an ancient 'Ngalong Einwanderung in the east. [...] Cho-cha-nga-cha-kha is more conservative in its pronunciation of many words than Dzongkha [....] Most verbal suffixes are cognate to their Dzongkha counterparts, but Cho-cha-nga-cha-kha has adopted the Bumthang infinitival ending -mala[.]

Under pressure to assimilate into the mainstream Dzongkha-speaking Ngalop culture, this proximity has resulted in significant loss of its particularly distinctive Kurichu linguistic substrate.

Nicholas Tournadre writes:

Among the eighteen Tibeto-Burman languages (henceforth TB) found in Bhutan, seven belong to the Tibetic group ... which was earlier called “Central Bodish” (see Tournadre, 2014). These languages include Dzongkha རྫོང་ཁ, Chocha Ngacha ཁྱོ་ཅ་ང་ཅ་ཁ་, Lakha ལ་ཁ་, and Merak-Saktengkha མེ་རག་སག་ང་ཁ་, Layakha ལ་ཡ་ཁ, Durkha ȭར་ཁ་ and Trashigang Kham བཀྲ་ཤིས་Ȉང་ཁམས་ǰད་. Lakha, Merak-Saktengkha, Layakha and Durkha are remnants of yak-herding pastoralist communities, while Dzongkha and Chocha-ngachakha were traditionally cultivator communities. These seven languages are all derived from a form of Old Tibetan (hence OT) and are closely related to Classical Tibetan (hence CT) or CHOS SKAD (ཆོས་སྐད), as it is often referred to in Dzongkha. This proximity to CT makes it easy to transcribe most words using the Classical orthography. Despite their close genetic relationship, however, these languages do not allow for good mutual intelligibility.

== See also ==
- Dzongkha
- Kurtöp language
- Languages of Bhutan
- Language shift
