= Kurtöp language =

East Bodish language of Bhutan

Kurtöp
- Zhâke, Au Gemale
- ཀུར་ཏོཏ་པི་ཁ་, ཞཱ་ཀེ་, ཨའུ་གེ་མ་ལེ
- Native to: Bhutan
- Region: Kurtö region
- Ethnicity: Kurtöps
- Native speakers: ~4,500 (2025)
- Language family: Sino-Tibetan: Tibeto-Burman; Bodish; East Bodish; Kurtöp
- Early form: Proto-Kurtöp
- Writing system: Tibetan script; Latin script

Language codes
- ISO 639-3: xkz
- Glottolog: kurt1248
- ELP: Kurtokha
- Kurtöp

Kurtöp (Kurtöp: ཀུར་ཏོཏ་པི་ཁ་, Kurtotpikha), also known as Zhâke (ཞཱ་ཀེ་) or Au Gemale (ཨའུ་གེ་མ་ལེ), is an endangered East Bodish language spoken by about 4,500 people primarily in the Lhüntse District of Bhutan. It is spoken by the Kurtöps, a group of subsistence and dairy farmers in the traditional Kurtö region near the Bhutan–China border, though some local Kurtöps speak Dzala or Chocangacakha instead. The language is traditionally considered a dialect of Bumthang, but more recent research has categorized Bumthang and Kurtöp, along with Kheng and Nupbi, as distinct languages within a larger Bumthangic subfamily.

Kurtöp is an agglutinative language with head-initial compounding and a mostly subject–object–verb word order. It is generally described as having active–stative alignment, though elements of ergative–absolutive structures are also present. Phonologically, Kurtöp has a three-way stop distinction between voiced, unvoiced, and unvoiced aspirated stops, which is typical of East Bodish languages. The language departs from its cousins in having innovated retroflex consonants and having the fewest allowed consonant clusters at twelve, which are only found in fewer than 0.01% of attested words. The language is currently undergoing tonogenesis, or developing phonemic tone; it contrasts between high and low tones, though only in specific phonetic environments. Unlike other tonal languages, Kurtöp also has a stress accent, typically falling on the first syllable of the root.

In collaboration with the Bhutanese government, a team led by the American linguist Gwendolyn Hyslop has developed an orthography based on the Uchen form of Tibetan script. Linguistic literature, however, tends to prefer the form written in the Latin alphabet based largely on the Romanization of Dzongkha, Bhutan's national language.

The number of speakers has been dwindling for several years. In 2017, estimates numbered speakers around 15,000, but as of 2025, the number is thought to be around 4,500. Intergenerational transmission is extremely low, with one survey noting that, while over 90% speak the language with their parents, only 7.5% speak it with their own children.

== Name ==
The term Kurtöp (ཀུར་ཏོ་པ་) is the Dzongkha word for a native of the traditional Kurtö region of Bhutan, roughly coterminous with the modern-day Lhüntse District in northeastern part of the country. The Dzongkha speakers call the language Kurtöpkha or Kurtöbikha, but the native term is ཀུར་ཏོཏ་པི་ཁ་ (Kurtotpikha). The region's name and its derivatives have been compared with Classical Tibetan སྐུར་སྟོད་ (skurstod, 'upper Kuri Chhu'), possibly related to Old Chinese *gar (河, 'the Yellow River').

Kurtöp is not spoken by all Kurtöps; other languages like Dzala and Chocangacakha are also spoken and often referred to as Kurtöp as well. The term for 'where are you going' is often used as a designator for languages in Bhutan, and Kurtöp is sometimes referred to as Au Gemale (ཨའུ་གེ་མ་ལེ), as contrasted with Dzala, which is called I Ga Brok. The language may also be known as Zhâke to distinguish it from other languages in the Kurtö region. The term is bimorphemic; it is unclear what the first morpheme zhâ means, but the second morpheme ke has been connected to Tibetan སྐད་ (skad, 'voice'); this term, however, is probably a loan from Dzongkha or a related language and is largely rejected by Kurtöp speakers themselves as a designation.

== Speakers ==
Most Kurtöp speakers are subsistence and dairy farmers. The language is mostly spoken between the villages of Gorgan, which is just south of the Lhüntse District, and Naling, near the Bhutan–China border. There are also significant populations of speakers in Australia and Canada, with smaller clusters in the United States and Japan.

The language is endangered and the number of speakers has been rapidly declining; all speakers are either bilingual or multilingual, also speaking at the very least either Dzongkha or Chocangacakha, though most speakers are familiar with others, including Nepali, Hindi, or English. Recent generations of Kurtöp speakers have sought education in Thimphu, often staying there and raising their children to speak Dzongkha only. In 2017, Kurtöp was spoken by around 15,000 people; as of 2025, there are estimated to be as few as 4,500 speakers remaining. A 2025 survey of intergenerational transmission found that while over 90% of respondents spoke Kurtöp with their parents, only 7.5% spoke it with their children.

== Classification ==
Kurtöp is an East Bodish language, one of the least studied branches in the Sino-Tibetan family. As of 2017, Kurtöp is the only East Bodish language with a substantive grammatical description. The East Bodish languages comprise the conservative branch of the Bodish languages of the Himalayas – primarily in and around eastern Bhutan – which split from the more innovative Tibetic branch which includes modern Tibetan. East Bodish also includes Bumthang, Kheng, Dzala, and Chali, among others. Bumthang, Kheng, Nupbikha, and Kurtöp have previously been considered to be dialects of Greater Bumthang, as they are notably even more conservative than even Classical Tibetan in some respects. More recent research, however, suggests that Dzala and Kurtöp are actually quite divergent from one another within East Bodish despite sharing the same colloquial name. According to a 2016 analysis, the phylogenetic tree can be described thus: (Note: The location of Nupbikha is from van Driem (2007).)

- East Bodish
  - Interior Bhutanese
    - Upper Mangdep
    - Greater Bumthang
      - Chali
      - Bumthangic (Note: Sometimes simply called the "Bumthang languages".)
        - Kheng
        - Bumthang
        - Nupbi
        - Kurtöp
  - Takpa–Dzala
    - Dzala
    - Takpa

== Phonology ==
Pema speaking Kurtöp

=== Consonants ===
Kurtöp consonants
		Labial	Dental (Note: Hyslop (2017) uses the term "dental fricatives" and "dental affricates", but employs the symbols for the alveolar fricatives and affricates, respectively, throughout.)	Retroflex (Note: Note that the combining diacritic ྼ is used to mark retroflexion – instead of the typical /r/-combining diacritic ྲ – to distinguish Kurtöp usage from diachronic orthographic changes in Tibetan and Dzongkha. For example, ཀྲ written as /kra/ is pronounced [ʈa] in Dzongkha.)	Palatal	Velar	Glottal
Stop	voiced	b ⟨བ , b⟩	d ⟨ད , d⟩	ɖ ⟨དྼ , dr⟩	ɟ ⟨ཇ , j⟩ (Note: བྱ is used with the onset /bj/.)	g ⟨ག , g⟩	
Stop	unvoiced	p ⟨པ , p⟩	t ⟨ཏ , t⟩	ʈ ⟨ཏྼ , tr⟩	c ⟨ཅ , c⟩ (Note: པྱ is used with the onset /pj/.)	k ⟨ཀ , k⟩	(ʔ)
Stop	aspirated	pʰ ⟨ཕ , ph⟩	tʰ ⟨ཐ , th⟩	ʈʰ ⟨ཐྼ , thr⟩	cʰ ⟨ཆ , ch⟩ (Note: ཕྱ is used with the onset /pʰj/.)	kʰ ⟨ཁ , kh⟩	
Affricate	plain		t͡s ⟨ཙ , ts⟩				
Affricate	aspirated		t͡sʰ ⟨ཚ , tsh⟩				
Fricative	voiced		z ⟨ཟ , z⟩				
Fricative	unvoiced		s ⟨ས , s⟩		ç ⟨ཤ , sh⟩ (Note: The phoneme /ç/ may be represented with a འ in Tibetic and zh in Roman in some instances, representing a historical /ʝ/ phoneme, which now distinguishes tone.)		h ⟨ཧ , h⟩
Nasal		m ⟨མ , m⟩	n ⟨ན , n⟩		ɲ ⟨ཉ , ny⟩ (Note: མྱ is used with the onset /mj/.)	ŋ ⟨ང , ng⟩	
Lateral	voiced		l ⟨ལ , l⟩ (Note: In combining forms, the descender is composed of both the ླ (l) and ྭ (w) diacritics, stacked in that order (i.e., ླྭ), in the Tshui script.)				
Lateral	unvoiced		l̥ ⟨ལྷ , lh⟩				
Rhotic			r ⟨ར , r⟩				
Semivowel		w ⟨ཝ , w⟩			j ⟨ཡ , y⟩		

Stops in Kurtöp mark a three-way contrast between voiced, unvoiced unaspirated, and unvoiced aspirated. Examples of minimal pairs include ཀ (ka, 'snow'), ཁ (kha; 'mouth, language'), and ག (ga, 'saddle'). This tripartite distinction is found in all East Bodish languages, though this is the fewest in the family. The palatal stops /c/, /cʰ/, and /ɟ/ are often affricated to [t͡ɕ], [t͡ɕʰ], and [d͡ʑ], respectively. Whether to classify this series as stops or affricates is of some debate, though the typological alignment of the three-way contrast and some palatogram data showing palatal articulation suggest the stop classification is correct. Unlike other consonants, palatal stops only occur in onset, probably as a result of origins in consonant clusters, which could only occur in onset in earlier forms of the language.

Retroflex consonants are relatively new innovations; they are not widely seen in other East Bodish consonant inventories and are likely the result of Tibetan influence. They are generally the result of complex consonant clusters which include a rhotic consonant, as in Classical Tibetan སྒྲོ (sgro, 'feather') with Kurtöp དྼོ (dro), pronounced [ɖò]. The retroflex stops are sometimes pronounced with a following rhotic – meaning, for example, /ʈ/ may be pronounced as either as [ʈr] or [tɹ], with all three forms existing in free variation.

Kurtöp has a maximal syllable structure of either CCVC or CCVV. It allows the fewest complex onsets in the East Bodish family, constrained to just twelve possible clusters: /pr/, /pj/, /pʰj/, /pʰr/, /pl, /br/, /bj/, /bl/, /kw/, /kʰw/, /gw/, /mr/, and /mj/. Many of these clusters have complex variations; for example, especially among younger speakers, /pj/ is sometimes realized as [pc] or simply [c] and /mj/ is often realized as [ɲ]. While possible, complex onsets are exceedingly rare, comprising fewer than 0.01% of the recorded 10,000 word lexicon; the cluster /pl/ is only attested in one word: པླྭིཀ་ (plik, 'circumsize'). (Note: Michailovsky & Mazaudon (1994) describe another example, པླྭོཏ་ (plot, 'come off'), which Hyslop (2017) acknowledges but did not find attested during her research.)

Codae in Kurtöp comprise /p/, /t/, /k/, /m/, /n/, /ŋ/, /r/, /l/, and /s/. Words ending in /k/, /s/, and /l/ are comparatively rare; /l/ is constrained to loanwords, /s/ is found in some dialectal forms such as in Gangzur, and /k/ is typically deleted altogether, though the elision of /s/ and /k/ result in compensatory lengthening. Typically, /s/ in coda is either fortified to [t] or deleted before heterosyllabic consonants; deletion appears to be more common when the following consonant is homorganic. The surface pronunciation of [l] only occurs in coda in loans – such as ང་གེལ་ (ngagel, 'sin of pride') or ཟུམ་ཐྼུལ་ (zumthrul, 'supernatural powers'), both loans from Classical Tibetan – but evidence suggests that it may persist natively as an underlying phoneme since it affects the surface representations of certain verbal paradigms. Often, word-final /k/ may reappear in word-medial codae. The term ཏྼཱུ་ (trû, 'stir'), when affixed with the perfective/egophoric suffix, becomes ཤང་ (trukshang); in other cases, it may undergo voicing alternation as in ཏྼུ་གེ་ (truge), where it is affixed with the polite imperative suffix.

=== Vowels ===
Kurtöp vowels
	Front		Central		Back	
	short	long	short	long	short	long
Close	i ⟨ི , i⟩, (y)	iː ⟨ཱི , î⟩			u ⟨ུ , u⟩	uː ⟨ཱུ , û⟩
Mid	e ⟨ེ , e⟩, (ø)	eː ⟨ཱེ , ê⟩			o ⟨ོ , o⟩	oː ⟨ཱོ , ô⟩
Open			ɐ ⟨ཨ, (Note: Consonants without any diacritical markers are open syllables ending in /ɐ/.) a⟩	ɐː ⟨ཱ , â⟩		

Kurtöp has a five-vowel monophthong inventory with four diphthongs: /ɐu/, /iu/, /ui/, and /oi/. (Note: Hyslop (2014) describes /ɐ/ as /ɑ/, and its resulting diphthong /ɐu/ as /au/.) Vowel length is contrastive, though contrasts are relatively rare. Examples include ལྷ་ (lha, 'deities') against ལྷཱ་ (lhâ, 'excess'). A 1994 report found a fifth diphthong, /ai/, which alternated with /eː/, though more recent reports have not corroborated this. It is possible this data was conflated with other local East Bodish languages, such as Bumthang and Khengkha which both have /ai/ where Kurtöp has /e/, which may be the result of a relatively recent sound change in Kurtöp. In rapid speech, the diphthong /ɐu/ is often pronounced [o].

Educated speech sometimes includes the front rounded vowels [y] and [ø] under influence of Dzongkha and Tibetan, typically where they are found in Tibetan, as after a coronal consonant in coda, or in place of diphthongs. (Note: Dzongkha rounded vowels are also under influence of Tibetan.) Examples of this include ཟོན་ (zon, 'two'), pronounced as [zøn] instead of [zon] in educated speech. While this change is areal to the Himalayan sprachbund, the use of front rounded vowels in Kurtöp is considered a borrowed feature.

=== Tone and prosody ===
Kurtöp is currently undergoing tonogenesis, or developing phonemic tone. Tone is only contrastive in initial syllables with either a sonorant or a palatal fricative /ç/ is in onset. Examples of minimal pairs include ཉེ́་ཝ་ ('nyewa, 'hell') against ཉེ་ཝ་ (nyewa, 'relatives'), and ཤ་ (sha, 'meat'), pronounced [çá], against ཞ་ (zha, 'what'), pronounced [çà]. In other circumstances, voiceless onsets lead to high tone syllables whereas voiced onsets lead to low tone. Examples include voiceless high tone ཏ་ (ta, 'ax') and ཐ་ (tha, 'weaving pattern') against voiced low tone ད་ (da, 'expletive'). Codae also do not affect tone; ཐྼང་ (thrang, 'climb'), ཕཏ་ (phat, 'leech'), and ཟམ་ (zam, 'bridge') all have their expected tones based on onset alone – high, high, and low, respectively.

It appears that the origins of the tone lie in the loss of voiceless consonants in complex onsets. Contrasting Kurtöp words with their Classical Tibetan cognates shows that the elision of word-initial /s/ may have led to high tone, as in ངཱ́་ ('ngâ, 'pillow') against its Classical Tibetan counterpart ཕཏ་ (sŋas). The historical path of this tonogenetic change is likely that the word-initial /s/ devoiced the following sonorant, creating a high tone, before voiced and unvoiced sonorants later merged; in other words, the contrast between voiced and unvoiced sonorants was lost but the tone differentiation remained. A handful of counterexamples may contradict this view, including Tibetan cognates that appear to have begun with a /z/, though these may be the result of changes within the history of Classical Tibetan after its phylogenetic divergence with Kurtöp.

In the Tibetic orthography, high tones are marked with an acute-like accent above the vowel marker and are only written when tone is contrastive. In the Roman orthography, a low tone is unmarked, while the high tone is marked with an apostrophe at the beginning of the high syllable, as in 'na ('nose', pronounced [ná]).

Unlike many tonal languages, Kurtöp also has a stress accent. In general, stress falls on the first syllable, though when a word is prefixed, the tone moves to the prefix and the stress remains on the root.

== Orthography ==
While literacy among the Kurtöp has some historical precedent, most children in Bhutan begin learning to write Dzongkha at a young age. During the priu festival, Buddhist monks in the village of Jasabi recite a text known as the Priu Zhung, though the text is heavily inlaid with Classical Tibetan and not consonant with the modern colloquial language; local scholars could recognize it as Kurtöp, rather than Dzongkha or Tibetan, but only with considerable difficulty.

Through collaboration between a team led by the American linguist Gwendolyn Hyslop and the government of Bhutan, the language now has two variant writing systems: a Romanized alphabet and a Uchen-based orthography. Originally, discussion revolved around whether to use the Tshui or the Joyig script; ultimately Joyig was chosen as the starting script, in part as an indigenous form of the Tibetan script and in part to avoid offending local Buddhists since Tshui is considered sacred.

The Romanized alphabet is based on the work of the Dutch linguist George van Driem and the Bhutanese politician Karma Tshering, originally designed for the Romanization of Dzongkha. Despite the development of the Tibetic orthography, modern linguistic scholarship typically uses the Romanization.

== Morphology ==
Typologically, Kurtöp is an agglutinative language. In general, verbs are composed of two or three morphemes, rarely exceeding five syllables. Basic nouns are typically disyllabic and at most trisyllabic. The language is mostly suffixing in its agglutination though the two negating morphemes are prefixes. Similarly, clitics are only enclitics, not proclitics; that is, they only occur after their host. Particles, by contrast, are more difficult to qualify; they are distinct from affixes and clitics in that they do not necessarily interact with phonotactics nor are they necessarily linked to other words in the sentence, though in both cases they may. For example, in rapid speech the question particle ཡོ་ (yo) may behave as a clitic while in more careful speech it behaves more as a distinct word, as in the following two examples:

ཨའུ་ གེ་ཝ་ལ་ ཡོ་ ?
'Au gewala yo?
where go-PFV QP.COP
'Where did you go?'

ཨའུ་ གེ་ཝ་ལྱོ་ ?
'Au gewalyo?
where {go-PFV=QP.COP}
'Where did you go?'

Though often done through affixation, Kurtöp also uses compounding in word formation. Examples include སེང་ (seng, 'wood') and ལེཔ་ (lep, 'flat thing') merging into སེང་ལེཔ་ (senglep, 'shingle'). Kurtöp compounds are head-initial, as in བྲང་ས་མོང་ (brangsamong, 'woven-bamboo shelter'), composed of བྲང་ས་ (brangsa, 'shelter') and མོང་ (mong, 'woven bamboo'); the order cannot be reversed. As of 2017, however, little has been done to study nominal compounding.

Some verbs in Kurtöp, known as "light verb nominals", are those composed of a gerund and a helping verb. The nouns in these constructions behave as direct objects and always come before their governing verb, but they differ from other kinds of nouns in that syntactically they cannot be modified in any way. Examples of this include ཅེ་ཐུང་ (ce thung), which means 'to swim', but literally translates as 'to do swimming'.

Another strategy of word formation is through reduplication, which affects different classes of words, including demonstratives, adjectives, and adverbs which serve to intensify the word. The reduplication of numerals is associated with distributives, as in the following examples:

ནེཏ་ ཏི་རུ་ ཡ་ང་ བི་ཤང་།
Net tiru yanga bishang
1.PL.ABS money five give-PFV:EGO
'We gave five ngultrum [to the group].'

ནེཏ་ ཏི་རུ་ ཡ་ང་ ཡང་ བི་ཤང་།
Net tiru yanga yang bishang
1.PL.ABS money five five give-PFV:EGO
'We gave [each of them] five ngultrum.'

Verbs may be reduplicated to form adverbs, such as ཐྼང་ཐྼང་ (thrangthrang; 'directly, straight away') which is reduplicated from ཐྼང་ (thrang, 'to be straight'). Onomatopoeia are also often formed with reduplication or echo formation; the latter may also signal something akin to 'and whatnot' or 'and the like'. Examples include ཏང་ཀ་ལིང་ཏོང་ཀ་ལིང་ (tangkaling tongkaling), which indicates an assortment of sounds like "hard, non-spherical object[s] rolling down a paved road".

While not obligatory in Kurtöp, certain animate nouns can be marked for grammatical gender, typically through an alternation of an initial /m/ for feminine nouns and /p/ or /pʰ/ for masculine ones. Examples include feminine མོཔ་ཟང་ (mopzang; 'glamorous woman') against masculine ཕོཔ་ཟང་ (phopzang; 'handsome man') and feminine གན་མོ་ (ganmo; 'old woman') against masculine གཏ་པོ་ (gatpo; 'old man').

== Syntax ==
Kurtöp has a constituent word order of subject–object–verb; though there are elements of free word order based on pragmatic information, the language is typically verb-final. Like other languages with verb-final syntax, Kurtöp uses postpositions rather than prepositions and genitive markers precede their heads. The language regularly employs pro-drop structures, eliding arguments from sentences altogether when context allows. Within noun phrases, the order is typically determiner–genitive phrase–noun–adjective–numeral–clitic, as in the following example:

ཁི་རི་ ཇ་ཆུང་གི་ ཨུ́་ཤ་ ཇིཀ་པ་
Khiri jachunggi 'usha jikpa
3.REFL.GEN garuda=GEN hat.HON big
'his big garuda hat'

=== Alignment ===
Morphosyntactic alignment in Kurtöp is difficult to determine, but it is closest to an active–stative alignment, also known as "split S". A substantial part the difficulty in identifying the precise alignment is that the categories are defined mostly by their semantic relationships rather than their syntactic ones. The grammatical forms are often described in terms of ergative–absolutive alignment, though the precise semantics of the terms "ergative" and "absolutive" often differ substantially to their use in reference to other ergative–absolutive languages.

There are three kinds of arguments in Kurtöp: subject (S), which is used as the sole argument of an intransitive verb; agent (A), which is used as the "agent-like" argument of a transitive verb; and object, which is used as the "patient-like" argument of a transitive verb. In general, the language divides its syntactic use of verbs based on valency, either transitive, which takes two arguments, or intransitive, which takes only one, though no arguments necessarily be overtly stated when they can be intuited from context.

=== Relator nouns ===
Like other Tibeto-Burman languages, Kurtöp exhibits a class of adpositions which are derived from and in some ways behave like nouns called "relator nouns". These relator nouns cannot be modified like typical nouns, but they behave similarly to nouns in genitive phrases and can take case markers. For example, the སུ་ (su, (Note: The alternative form སུས་ (sus) is attested in Gangzur.) roughly 'bottom') may be used as the locative complement to a genitive phrase or alone in an adverbial sense as in the following examples, respectively:

བས་གི་ སུ་ཀོ་ གེ་ ངཀ་སི་ དོཏ་ ནི་ས་ལ་།
Basgi suko ge ngaksi dot nisala
bus=GEN RN=LOC go do-NF sleep stay-PFV
'[I] went under the bus and slept there.'

སུ་ཀོ་ ན་ཝལ་ སོ་སོ་ ལ་།
Suko nawal soso la
RN=LOC COP.EXIS different POL
'There is a different one at the base.'

== Vocabulary ==
Most Kurtöp words are of Tibeto-Burman origin, though extended interactions with nearby languages as well as an influx of English loans has led to substantial borrowing. There are several terms in Kurtöp that are clearly from Proto-Tibeto-Burman but not shared with Tibetan or other Central Bodish languages, including ཇུ་ (ju, 'breast') and ཞོང་ (zhong; 'bug, insect'). Classical Tibetan, being the liturgical language of the Kurtöp, has a large corpus of loans in the language and many of them are related to Buddhist religious concepts, including ཀེལ་ཆེན་ (kelchen, 'great eon'), from Classical Tibetan བསྐལ་ཆེན་ (bskalchen), and ཀ་ཉེལ་ (kanyel, 'difficulty'), from དཀའ་ངལ་ (dka'ngal). A handful of other words have been borrowed from other languages such as པ་རི་ཝ་ (pariwa, 'pigeon'), from Nepali परेवा (parewa); ཅ་པལ་ (capal; 'sandal, slipper'), from Hindi चप्पल (cappal); and བེས་ཀོཔ་ (beskop; 'movie'), from English bioscope.

Like modern Tibetan and Dzhongkha, Kurtöp employs two different registers known as zhesa (Classical Tibetan: ཞེ་ས་) and phelke (ཕལ་སྐད་, phalskad). Zhesa is the higher register and is composed exclusively of loans from Classical Tibetan. Examples the contrast include the word for 'eye' – zhesa ཅེན་ (cen) against phelke མཱི་ (mî) – and the word for 'to give' – zhesa ན́ང་ ('nang) against phelke བི་ (bi). In general, zhesa is supposed to be used to show deference or respect, either to the person they are talking to or the subject at hand. The pragmatics of usage are believed to be more complicated, though not much study has been done on Kurtöp zhesa speech in particular.
