= Gongdue Gewog =

Gongdue Gewog དགོངས་འདུས་
- Gewogs
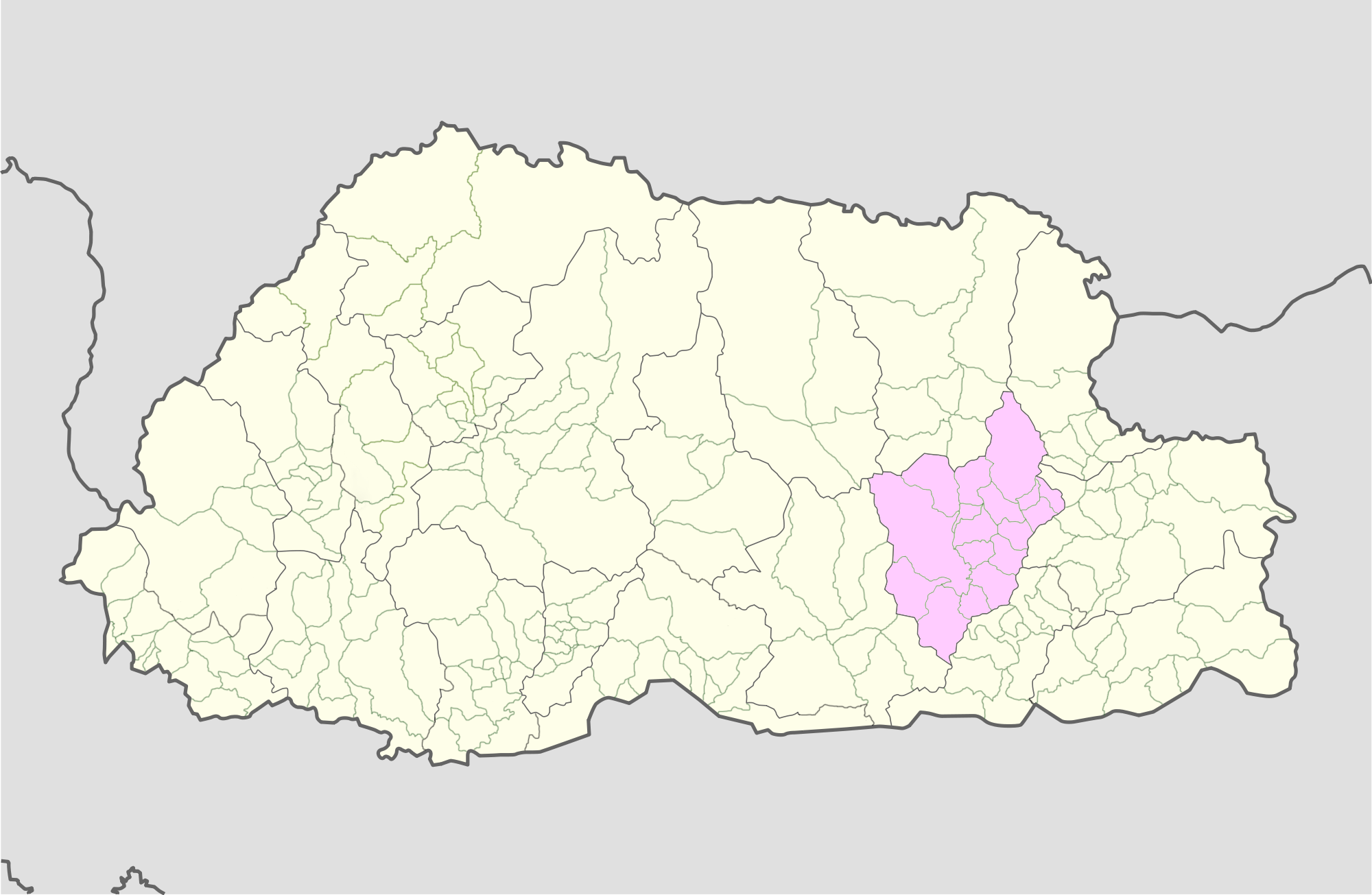
- Country: Bhutan
- District: Mongar District
- Time zone: UTC+6 (BTT)

Gongdue Gewog (Dzongkha: དགོངས་འདུས་) is a gewog (village block) of Mongar District, Bhutan.

== See also ==
- Gongduk language
