= Karma Tshering =

Bhutanese politician

Appointed member of the National Council of Bhutan
- Incumbent
- Assumed office 10 May 2018
- Preceded by: himself
- In office 2015–2018
- Succeeded by: himself

Karma Tshering is a Bhutanese politician who has been an appointed member of the National Council of Bhutan, since May 2018. Previously, he was an appointed member of the National Council of Bhutan from 2015 to 2018.
