= Takpa language =

Bodish language spoken in Tibet and Bhutan

Takpa
- Tawang Monpa
- དག་པ་ཁ་, dakpakha
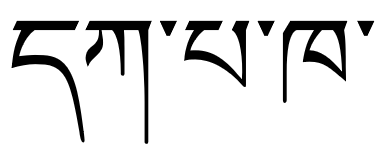
- Region: India; Bhutan; Lhoka, Tibet
- Ethnicity: Takpa
- Native speakers: 9,100 in India (2006); 2,000 in Bhutan (2011); 1,300 in China (2000 census)
- Language family: Sino-Tibetan: Tibeto-Burman?; Tibeto-Kanauri?; Bodish; East Bodish; Dakpa–Dzala; Takpa
- Writing system: Tibetan script

Language codes
- ISO 639-3: Variously: dka – Dakpa twm – Tawang Monpa tkk – Takpa (deprecated)
- Glottolog: dakp1242
- ELP: Dakpa; Takpa
- Takpa is classified as Vulnerable by the UNESCO Atlas of the World's Languages in Danger.

The Takpa or Dakpa language (Tibetan: དག་པ་ཁ་, Wylie: dak pa kha), Dakpakha, known in India as Tawang Monpa, also known as Brami in Bhutan, is an East Bodish language spoken in the Tawang district of Arunachal Pradesh, and in northern Trashigang District in eastern Bhutan, mainly in Kyaleng (Shongphu gewog), Phongmed Gewog, Dangpholeng and Lengkhar near Radi Gewog. Van Driem (2001) describes Takpa as the most divergent of Bhutan's East Bodish languages, though it shares many similarities with Bumthang. SIL reports that Takpa may be a dialect of the Brokpa language and that it been influenced by the Dzala language whereas Brokpa has not.

Takpa is mutually unintelligible with Monpa of Zemithang and Monpa of Mago-Thingbu. Monpa of Zemithang is another East Bodish language, and is documented in Abraham, et al. (2018).

Wangchu (2002) reports that Tawang Monpa is spoken in Lhou, Seru, Lemberdung, and Changprong villages, Tawang District, Arunachal Pradesh.

== Phonology ==
These tables represent the phonemes of the variety of Takpa spoken in China, in Tsona County.

=== Vowels ===
	Front	Central	Back
High	i i iː [iː] y y yː [yː]		u u uː [uː]
Mid	e [e] eː [eː]	ʌ ʌ ʌː [ʌː]	o o oː [oː]
Low	ɛ [ɛ] ɛː ɛː	a a aː [aː]	ɔ ɔ ɔː [ɔː]

=== Consonants ===
		Bilabial	Alveolar		Retroflex	Pal.-alv.	Velars		Glottal
		Bilabial	Median	Lateral	Retroflex	Pal.-alv.	Palatals	Velars	Glottal
Stops	Voiceless	p p	t t					k k	ʔ ʔ
Stops	Aspirated	ph pʰ	th tʰ					kh kʰ	
Stops	Voiced	b b	d d					ɡ ɡ	
Fricatives	Voiceless		s s	ɬ ɬ	ʂ ʂ	ɕ ɕ			h h
Fricatives	Voiced		z z			ʑ ʑ			
Affricates	Voiceless		ts t͡s		tʂ t͡ʂ	tɕ t͡ɕ	c͡ç c͡ç		
Affricates	Aspirated		tsh t͡sʰ		tʂh t͡ʂʰ	tɕh t͡ɕʰ	cçh c͡çʰ		
Affricates	Voiced		dz d͡z		dʐ d͡ʐ	dʑ d͡ʑ	ɟʝ ɟ͡ʝ		
Liquids			r r	l l					
Nasals		m m	n n		ɳ ɳ			ŋ ŋ	
Semivowel		w w				j j			

Monba is a tonal language, with four contour tones: 55, 53, 35, and 31.

== See also ==
- Languages of Bhutan
