= Nyen language =

Bodish language spoken in Bhutan

Nyenkha
- Native to: Bhutan
- Native speakers: 8,700 (2010)
- Language family: Sino-Tibetan: Tibeto-Burman; Tibeto-Kanauri?; Bodish; EastBodish; Nyenkha
- Writing system: Tibetan script

Language codes
- ISO 639-3: neh
- Glottolog: nyen1254
- ELP: Nyenkha

Nyenkha (Dzongkha: འནྱེན་ཁ་; Wylie: 'Nyen-kha; also called "'Nyenkha", "Henkha", "Lap", "Nga Ked", and "Mangsdekha") is an East Bodish language spoken by about 10,000 people in the eastern, northern, and western areas of the Black Mountains. Speakers live primarily between the Tang Chuu to the east and Mangde Chhu to the west, from the town of Trongsa in Trongsa District; along Black River passes in the Trongsa District villages of Taktse and Usar; to in Ridha and Tashiding villages, and Phobji, Dangchu, and Sephu Gewogs and surrounding villages in southeast Wangdue Phodrang District.

Nyenkha is related to the East Bodish Bumthangkha and Kurtöpkha, with 75–77% and 69% lexical similarity, respectively, however they are not mutually intelligible. Dialects within Nyenkha show variation in tone and vocabulary. Dialects are generally named for their villages, such that names for the overall language are largely confined to academia.

== Population ==
The 1991 census revealed 11,472 Nyenkha speakers in six gewogs of Bhutan. In 1993, the number of speakers was around 10,000 according to van Driem. A 2010 study showed about 8700 speakers in 10 gewogs, which had been redrawn several times since 1991. The decline in numbers may be attributed to population shifts as landless families and former slash-and-burn agriculturalists relocate to areas opened for settlement. In addition to migration and movement, modernization trends have served to limit the practicality of Nyenkha as a fully functional language. Despite the decline in numbers and a shift toward bilingualism, the majority of young people remain fluent in the language.

Many speakers of Nyen have extensive contact with other languages of Bhutan, often through trade. Traditionally, Nyen speakers raised sheep and other livestock for Labi speakers in exchange for cereals from lower altitudes. The communities also traditionally shared Bonpo orators.

== Vocabulary ==
Nyenkha basic vocabulary shows significant difference to Kurtöp (Zhake), a sister East Bodish language, and to Dzongkha, the national language.

Nyenkha	Kurtöp	Dzongkha	English
dasu	dasum/dusum	dari	today
dawl	dangla	khatsa	yesterday
naembae	yamba	naba	tomorrow
doe/doegyi	dodlai	nyaeda	sleep
zoo/zayee	zooye	za	eat
chhung	thrung	chhum	rice
nes	nad	naa	barley
zeng	kar	kaa	wheat
kapch	kebtang	kebta	bread
kheh	khoe	chhu	water

== Grammar ==
Nyenkha has no grammatical gender. Nouns and pronouns may be singular or plural.

Nyenkha personal pronouns
	Singular	Plural
1p	སྔ་ nga	ནེ་ ney
2p	གཡེ་ gye	ཡིད་ yid
3p	ཁི་ khi	བོས་ boe

Unlike Dzongkha and most other languages of Bhutan, Nyenkha verbs inflect according to subject number: སྔ་ལཱེག་དོ་ nga laeg-do, "I am going;" ནེ་ལཱ་ཆུག་དོ་ ney laachhug-do, "We are going;" ཁི་ལས་ཤི་ khi las-shi, "He/she has gone"; བོས་ལཱ་ཆུག་ཤི་ boe laachhug-shi, "They have gone."

== See also ==
- Languages of Bhutan
