= ʼOle language =

Sino-Tibetan language of western Bhutan

ʼOle
- Black Mountain Monpa
- Native to: Bhutan
- Region: Black Mountains
- Ethnicity: 150 ʼOle
- Native speakers: 1 (2016); L2: 2 (2016)
- Language family: Sino-Tibetan?
- Writing system: Tibetan script

Language codes
- ISO 639-3: ole
- Glottolog: olek1239
- ELP: Olekha
- ʼOle is classified as Definitely Endangered by the UNESCO Atlas of the World's Languages in Danger

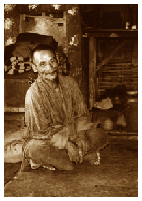
Rindzi Phup, one of the last speakers of the ʼOle Mönpa language. Photo by George van Driem

ʼOle, also called ʼOlekha or Black Mountain Monpa, is a moribund, possibly Sino-Tibetan language spoken natively by 1 person in the Black Mountains of Wangdue Phodrang and Trongsa Districts in western Bhutan. The term ʼOle refers to a clan of speakers.

== Geographic distribution ==
According to the Ethnologue, ʼOlekha is spoken in the following locations of Bhutan.

- Trongsa District: 3 enclaves west of Mangde river
- Wangdue Phodrang District: Adha, Jangji, Rukha, Thrumzur, and Wangling villages

Dialects are separated by the Black Mountains.

== Classification ==
ʼOle forms a distinct branch of Sino-Tibetan/Tibeto-Burman. It is not closely related to Tshangla language of eastern Bhutan, also called "Monpa" and predating Dzongkha in the region, which belongs to a different branch of the family.

The following comparative vocabulary table from Gerber (2020) compares Gongduk, Black Mountain Mönpa, and Bjokapakha, which is a divergent Tshangla variety.

Gloss	Gongduk	Black Mountain Mönpa	Bjokapakha
hair (on head)	θɤm	guluŋ	tsham
tongue	dəli	líː	lɪ
eye	mik	mek ~ mik	miŋ
ear	nərəŋ	naktaŋ	nabali
tooth	ɤn	áː ~ waː	sha
bone	rukɤŋ	ɦɤtphok ~ yöphok	khaŋ
blood	winiʔ	kɔk	yi
hand/arm	gur	lɤk ~ lok	gadaŋ
leg/foot	bidɤʔ	dɤkpɛŋ ~ tɛ̤kɛŋ	bitiŋ
faeces	ki	cok	khɨ
water	dɤŋli	cö, khe	ri
rain	wɤ	ghö	ŋamtsu
dog	oki	cüla ~ khula	khu
pig	don	pɔk	phakpa
fish	kuŋwə	nye̤	ŋa
louse	dɤr	θæːk	shiŋ
bear	bekpələ	wɤm ~ wom	omsha
son	ledə	bæθaː	za
daughter	medə	bæmɛt	zamin
name	kət	mön ~ min	mɨŋ
house	kiŋ	mhiː̤ ~ mhe̤ː	phai
fire	mi	áːmik ~ áːmit	mɨ
to hear	lə yu-	goː-	nai tha-
to see	tɤŋ-	tuŋ-	thoŋ-
to look	məl- ~ mɤt-	mak-	got-
to sit	mi- ~ mu-	buŋ- ~ bæŋ-	laŋ-
to die	komθ-	θɛː- ~ θɛʔ-	shi-
to kill	tɤt-	θüt- ~ θut- ~ θit	she-

Comparison of numerals:

Gloss	Gongduk	Black Mountain Mönpa	Bjokapakha
one	ti	tɛk	thur
two	niktsə	nhü	ɲiktsiŋ
three	towə	sam	sam
four	piyə	blö	pshi
five	ŋəwə	lɔŋ	ŋa
six	kukpə	o̤ːk	khuŋ
seven	ðukpə	nyí	zum
eight	yitpə	jit [ʤit]	yɪn
nine	guwə	doːga	gu
ten	deyə	chö	se

Comparison of pronouns:

Pronoun	Gongduk	Black Mountain Mönpa	Bjokapakha
1SG	ðə	kö	jaŋ
2SG	gi	iŋ	nan
3SG	gon	hoʔma (MASC); hoʔmet (FEM)	dan
1PL	ðiŋ	ɔŋdat (INCL); anak (EXCL)	ai
2PL	giŋ	iŋnak	nai
3PL	gonmət	hoʔoŋ	dai

== Dialects ==
Black Mountain Monpa is spoken in at least 6 villages. The variety spoken in Rukha village, south-central Wangdi is known as ʼOlekha. Out of a population of 100-150 people (about 15 households) in Rukha village, there is only one elderly female fluent speaker and two semi-fluent speakers of ʼOlekha.

George van Driem (1992) reports a Western dialect (spoken in Rukha and Reti villages) and Eastern dialect (spoken in Cungseng village).

According to Tournadre & Suzuki (2023), there are three dialects, spoken by 500 speakers in Tronsa ཀྲོང་སར་ and Wangdi Phodr’a དབང་འདུས་ཕོ་བྲང་ districts..

- western (in Riti and Rukha)
- northern (in Wangling, Jangbi, and Phumz’ur)
- southern (in Cungseng and Berti)

== History ==
ʼOle was unknown beyond its immediate area until 1990, and is now highly endangered, and was originally assumed to be East Bodish. George van Driem described ʼOle as a remnant of the primordial population of the Black Mountains.

More recently, Gwendolyn Hyslop (2016), agreeing with van Driem, has suggested that ʼOle is an isolate branch of the Sino-Tibetan family that has been heavily influenced by East Bodish languages. Because of the small number of cognates with East Bodish languages once loans are identified, Blench and Post provisionally treat ʼOle as a language isolate, not just an isolate within Sino-Tibetan.

== Phonology ==
Consonants
		Labial	Alveolar	Retroflex	Palatal	Velar	Uvular	Glottal
Plosive	oral	p b	t d	(ʈ) (ɖ)	c ɟ	k g		ʔ
Plosive	aspirated	pʰ	tʰ	(ʈʰ)	cʰ	kʰ		
Affricate	oral		ts (dz)					
Affricate	aspirated		(tsʰ)					
Fricative	sibilants		s z		ʃ ʒ		ʁ	h
Fricative	non-sibilants		ɬ		ç			
Nasal		m	n		ɲ	ŋ		
Approximant		w	r, l		j			

- Consonants in parentheses are only found in loanwords.
- /s z/ are realized as dental fricatives [θ ð] in eastern dialects.
- The stops /t k/ are glottalised and unreleased [ʔt̚ ʔk̚] at the end of syllables.

Vowels
	Front		Central	Back
	Unrounded	Rounded	Central	Back
High	i	y		u
Mid	e	ø	ɤ	o
Low	ɛ		a	ɔ

- /a/ can often be heard as [ɑ~ə].
- A distinction in vowel length can be attested, but it is not known whether it is phonemic.

Additionally, ʼOle has two tones; high and low.

== Vocabulary ==
Hyslop (2016) notes that ʼOlekha has borrowed heavily from East Bodish and Tibetic languages, but also has a layer of native vocabulary items. Numerals are mostly borrowed from East Bodish languages, while body parts and nature words are borrowed from both Tibetic and East Bodish languages. Hyslop (2016) lists the following ʼOlekha words of clearly indigenous (non-borrowed) origin.

- six: wok
- head: peː
- face: ék
- rain: gø
- earth: tʰabak
- ash: tʰækʰu
- stone: loŋ
- fire: ámik
- grandfather: tana
- grandmother: ʔɐˈpeŋ
- chicken: ˈkɤgɤ
- mustard: pekoŋ
- cotton: ʔɐˈpʰɪt
- eggplant: ˈpandala
- foxtail millet: ʔamet

The pronouns and lexical items for all foraged plants are also of indigenous origin. Additionally, the central vowel /ɤ/ and voiced uvular fricative /ʁ/ are only found in non-borrowed words.

Words whose origin is not certain (i.e., may or may not be borrowed) are:

- nose: ná (perhaps borrowed from East Bodish?)
- arm: lok (perhaps borrowed from Tibetic?)
- wind: lǿ
- water: cø
- mother: ʔɔmɔ
- father: ʔɔpɔ
- dog: tʃylɔ
- sheep: lu
- barley: nápʰa
- bitter buckwheat: máma

The cardinal numerals are:

1. tɛk
2. nhü
3. sam
4. blö
5. lɔŋ
6. o̤ːk
7. nyí
8. jit [ʤit]
9. doːga
10. chö
