= Bon in Bhutan =

Religion in Bhutan

Before the introduction of Buddhism in Bhutan, the prevalent religion was Bon. Some scholars assert that it was imported from Tibet and India, perhaps in the eighth century when Padmasambhava introduced his lineages of Vajrayana Buddhism into Tibet and the Himalayas. Some scholars hold that Bön doctrine became so strongly reinvigorated in Bhutan by Buddhism that by the eleventh century it reasserted itself as an independent school. Bön continues to be practiced in modern Bhutan.

Scofield (1976: p. 669), one of the first western journalists into Bhutan, outlined that:

One Sunday I watched the monks shape an elaborate offering of dough and colored butter and put it atop a roof...as a treat for the ravens. "All living things are sacred," a monk explained, "but especially the ravens. They spend their days repeating one of our holy syllables, 'Ah! Ah! Ah!'" Killing a raven, he informed me, would be as great a sin as slaughtering a thousand monks...

The dough offering is what is known as a torma. The sacred syllable a, the first letter and sound of the Sanskrit and Tibetan languages, is a bīja mantra about which volumes have been written in Hinduism, Bon and Vajrayana. Ravens are sacred in many traditions and for many peoples.

== Sources ==
- Karma Phuntsho (2013). The History of Bhutan. Nodia: Random House India. pp. 135–136. ISBN 9788184003116.
- Scofield, John (1976). Life Slowly Changes In A Remote Himalayan Kingdom. In National Geographic, November 1976.
