= Dzala language =

Bodish language spoken in Bhutan

Dzala
- Dzala 'Mat
- Region: Bhutan, Tibet
- Native speakers: 20,000-40,000 (2022)
- Language family: Sino-Tibetan: Tibeto-Burman?; Tibeto-Kanauri?; Bodish; East Bodish; Takpa–Dzala; Dzala
- Writing system: Tibetan script

Language codes
- ISO 639-3: dzl
- Glottolog: dzal1238

The Dzala language, also called Dzalakha, Dzalamat, or Yangtsebikha, is an East Bodish language spoken primarily in northeastern Bhutan, in the Lhuntse and Trashiyangtse Districts, and in Tibet. A 2022 study estimated that there are 40,000 speakers of Dzala.

== Classification ==
Map of Bhutan showing language distribution, based on van Driem 1993. Dzala is shown in tan in northeastern Bhutan.

Dzala is an East Bodish language, part of a family of seven languages that are primarily located in Bhutan, but extend into Tibet, and possibly into the Indian state of Arunachal Pradesh. The East Bodish languages are related to Classical Tibetan but are not believed to be directly descended from it. The current working hypothesis among researchers on the East Bodish languages is that they descended from a sister language of Classical Tibetan. An alternative possibility is that the similarities between East Bodish and Tibetan stems from language contact.

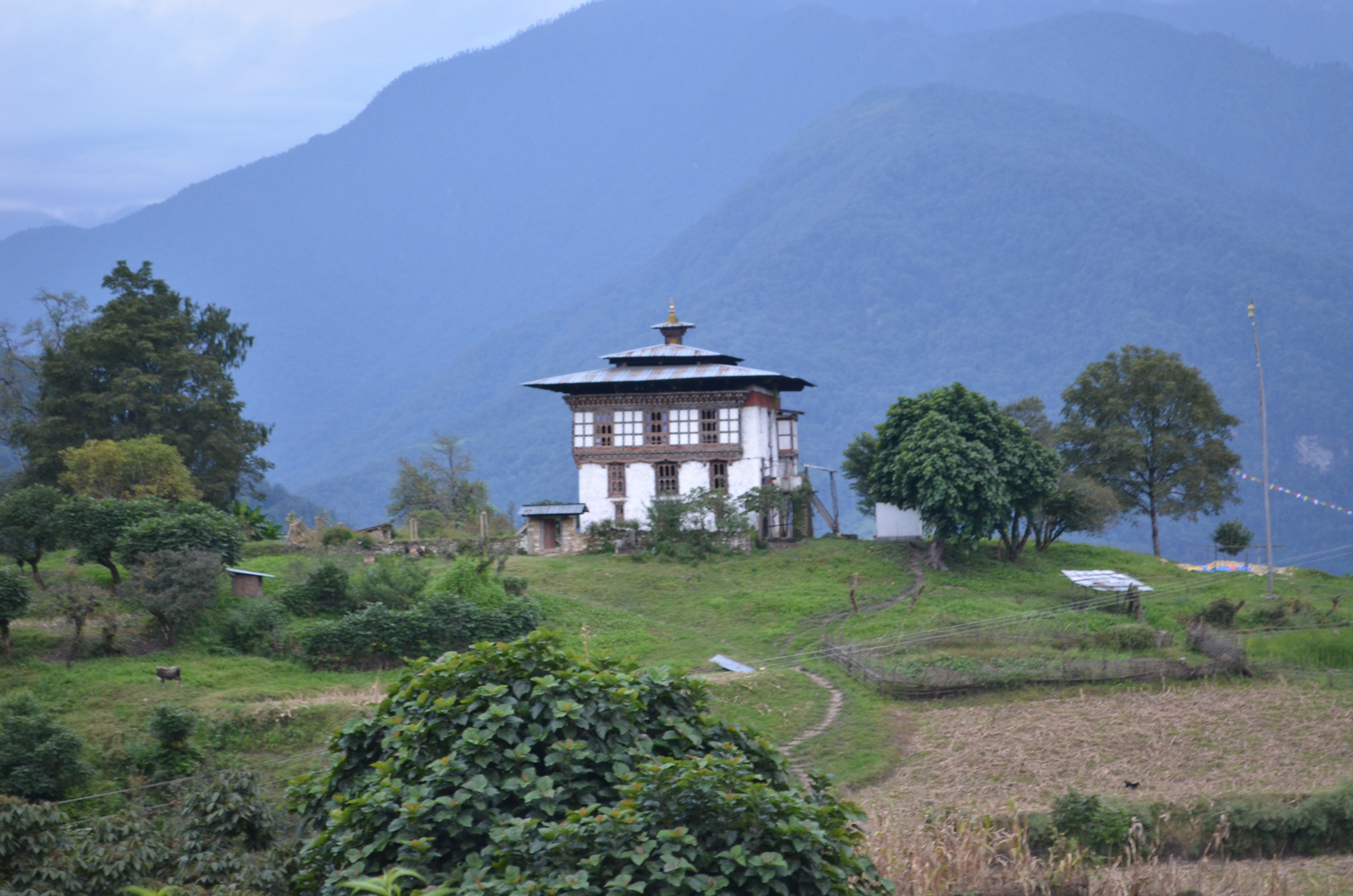
A house in the mountainous landscape of the Lhuntse district in Bhutan, where Dzala is spoken

Dzala is most closely related to Takpa, another East Bodish language in Bhutan, both located on the eastern edge of East Bodish languages. They have substantial overlap in their core vocabulary, and speakers of the languages share the intuition that they are closely related. Dzala has been less influenced by the Central Bodish languages than Takpa.

== Phonology ==
=== Consonants ===
Dzala, like the other extant East Bodish languages, has a three-way voicing distinction.

		Labial	Dental/ Alveolar	Post-alveolar	Velar	Uvular	Glottal
Nasal		m	n				
Stop	aspirated	pʰ	tʰ		kʰ		
Stop	voiced	b	d		ɡ		
Stop	ejective	pʼ	tʼ		kʼ	qʼ	
Affricate	aspirated		t͡sʰ	t͡ʃʰ			
Affricate	voiced		d͡z	d͡ʒ			
Affricate	ejective		t͡sʼ	t͡ʃʼ			
Fricative	voiceless		s	ʃ	x		h
Fricative	voiced	v	z	ʒ	ɣ		
Vibrant			r				
Lateral			l				

=== Vowels ===
	Front	Central	Back
Close	i		u
Mid	e		o
Open		a	

=== Tone ===
Like other East Bodish languages, Dzala has a developing tonal system. It has a high-low register tone distinction. Tone is contrastive following sonorants but predictable following obstruents (with high tone following voiceless obstruents).

== Grammar ==
=== Morphology ===
Dzala has a loosely-grammaticalized marking system for tense, aspect, and mood plus evidentiality. Ergativity is marked by the -gi suffix.

== Vocabulary ==
The vocabulary of Dzala provides evidence of a close relationship with Takpa, though there are notable differences between the languages. Kinship terms are clear examples of both the overlap and distinctiveness between the languages.

Selected lexical items in Dzala and Takpa (from van Driem 2007)
Dzala	Takpa	English gloss
kha	kha	mouth
khâma	khâ	hen
burmɪn	zhɔmu	daughter
zhomo	zhɔmu	younger sister
