= Kheng language =

Bodish language spoken in Bhutan

Kheng
- ཁེངས་ཁ་ or འཁྱེང་ཁ་
- Native to: Bhutan
- Ethnicity: Kheng
- Native speakers: 50,000 (2003); Total speakers: 65,000
- Language family: Sino-Tibetan: Tibeto-Burman; Tibeto-Kanauri?; Bodish; EastBodish; Kheng
- Writing system: Tibetan script

Language codes
- ISO 639-3: xkf
- Glottolog: khen1241
- ELP: Khengkha

The Khengkha language (Dzongkha: ཁེངས་ཁ་ or འཁྱེང་ཁ་), or Kheng, is an East Bodish language (non-Tibetic language) spoken by ~40,000 native speakers worldwide, in the Zhemgang, Trongsa, and Mongar districts of south–central Bhutan.

== Classification ==
Khengkha is a dialect found in the small Himalayan kingdom of Bhutan. Khengkha is part of the larger branch of Sino-Tibetan (also referred to as Trans-Himalayan) language family but falls into the subcategories of: Tibetio-Burman, Western Tubeto-Burman, Bodish, East Bodish, Bumthang, and Khengkha.

== Geographical distribution ==
Khengkha is an East Bodish language spoken in the south-central districts of Bhutan. Khengkha speakers are mainly found in the Zhemgang District but can also be found in southwest Mongar District, rural areas in southeast Trongsa District and in the Sarpang District.

=== Dialects ===
The three main dialects in Bumthang district are Bumthap (Lower Kheng), Khempa (Middle Kheng), and Kurtöp (Upper Kheng). Comprehension between the three dialects differs as Bumthap is the most similarly related language, however conversation with Kurthop is difficult.

== Phonology ==
=== Consonants ===
		Labial	Alveolar	Post- alveolar	Velar	Glottal
Nasal		m	n	(ȵ)	ŋ	
Plosive	voiceless	p	t		k	ʔ
Plosive	aspirated	pʰ	tʰ		kʰ	
Plosive	voiced	b	d		ɡ	
Affricate	voiceless		ts	tɕ ~ tʃ		
Affricate	aspirated		tsʰ	tɕʰ ~ tʃʰ		
Affricate	voiced		dz	dʑ ~ dʒ		
Fricative	voiceless		s	ɕ ~ ʃ		h
Fricative	voiced		z	ʑ ~ ʒ		
Rhotic			r ~ ɹ			
Approximant	central	w	r ~ ɹ	j		
Approximant	lateral		l			

- /r/ can be heard as either a trill [r] or an approximant [ɹ] in free variation.
- Alveolo-palatal sounds /tɕ, tɕʰ, dʑ, ɕ, ʑ/ can also range to palato-alveolar sounds [tʃ, tʃʰ, dʒ, ʃ, ʒ] in free variation.

Final consonants
	Labial	Alveolar	Velar	Glottal
Plosive	p	t	k	ʔ
Nasal	m	n	ŋ	
Fricative		(s)		
Rhotic		r		
Approximant		(l)		

=== Vowels ===
	Front	Central	Back
Close	i		u
Mid	e	(ø̈)	o
Open		a	
Diphthong		ai	

- A centralized rounded [ø̈] does appear, but is mostly borrowed from words in Dzongkha.
- /a/ can appear slightly back as [ʌ] or [ɑ] within diphthongs or codas.
- /i, e/ can be heard as [ɪ, ɛ] when in short form.

== Grammar ==
In most Khengkha sentences, it only marks grammatical relations through word order. The subject constituent precedes the object and the verb constituents follow it. Khengkha follows the same typology as Dzongkha. The example below demonstrates how the grammatical roles of each constituent are marked only by the position relative to the verb:

Ngai meng Dorji wenn.
My name Dorji is.
{} S O V
"My name is Dorji."

When nouns are addressed in Khengkha there are two ways it can be written, depending on the other.

1. Relatives before noun heads or articles.
2. Adjectives after noun heads.

Khengkha is an oral language without a writing system, making tones and nuances important during communication.

=== Language Use ===
Khengkha is a vigorous language in limited areas. Khengkha is not allowed to be taught in schools around Bhutan, making it only spoken at home, for commerce, local politics, and traditional religion. Due to the increasing modernization of Bhutan, there are negative attitudes towards those who speak Kheng instead of Dzongkha or the English. Lower Kheng is considered to be spoken backward, while Middle Kheng is seen as more prestigious. Middle Kheng region is the strongest and most developed economically, while lower Kheng is least developed.

=== Language Development ===
Since Khengkha is an oral language there is a low literacy rate for native Khengkha speakers in Dzongkha. There is literacy rate of 20% in Dzongkha.

== Common phrases ==
As there is no official English romanization of Dzongkha script, many words are spelled out phonetically. Therefore, there may be multiple spellings of the same word.

English	Khengkha	Dzongkha
Hello	Kuzu zangpo	Kuzu zangpo
How are you?	Wed ato nag yo?	Choe gadey be yoe?
My name is Dorji.	Ngai meng Dorji wenn	Ngegi ming Dorji 'ing.
It was nice meeting you.	Nga wed domsay nyeng gas a.	Chö dang je di sem ga-i.
Okay, I will see you again.	Kai nyeng dom.	Yaya, lok shu ley jel gey.
Sorry	Nyeng ma ja yai	Gom ma thay
Who	Aii yo	Ga
What	Ja yo	Gaci
When	Arba	Nam
Where	Aucu ta say/ Aun	Gate
Why	Jai bu say/ Ato bu say	Gaci bey
How	Ato	Gade
Where are you from?	Yoe ah nga yo?	Chö 'ü: gate le mo?
I am from Bumthang.	Nga Bumthang do when.	Nga Bumthang le 'ing.
I am thirsty.	Nga ka kampa	Kha khom chi.
I am hungry.	Nga tog pai say sa.	Toh ke chi.
Morning	Nga si	Droba
Afternoon	Nyen cha	Nyin-che
Evening	So suitlas	Chiru
Night	San	Numo

=== Numerical ===
Khengkha counting system is written in Dzongkha script but pronounced differently. Below is a comparison of Khengkha and Dzongkha numbers.

#	Khengkha		Dzongkha
1	༡	Thak	༡	Ci:
2	༢	Zoom	༢	Nyi:
3	༣	Sum	༣	Sum
4	༤	Blay	༤	Zhi
5	༥	Ya-Nga	༥	Nga
6	༦	Grog	༦	Dru
7	༧	Ngee	༧	Dün
8	༨	Jat	༨	Gä
9	༩	Dogo	༩	Gu
10	༡༠	Choe	༡༠	Cutham
11	༡༡	Chowouray	༡༡	Cuci:
12	༡༢	Chowazone	༡༢	Cu-'nyi
13	༡༣	Chowasum	༡༣	Cusum
14	༡༤	Choebloy	༡༤	Cuzhi
15	༡༥	Choenga	༡༥	Ce-'nga
16	༡༦	Choegrok	༡༦	Cudru
17	༡༧	Choerngyee	༡༧	Cupdün
18	༡༨	Cheorjat	༡༨	Copgä
19	༡༩	Choedogo	༡༩	Cugu
20	༢༠	Nyeesho	༢༠	Khe Ci:/ Nyishu
30	༣༠	Khaidehichoe	༣༠	Sumchu
40	༤༠	Khaizone	༤༠	Zhipcu
50	༥༠	Khaizone Choe	༥༠	Ngapcu
60	༦༠	Khaisum	༦༠	Drupcu
70	༧༠	Khaisum ni Choe	༧༠	Düncu
80	༨༠	Khaiblay	༨༠	Gäpcu
90	༩༠	Khaiblay ni Choe	༩༠	Gupcu
100	༡༠༠	Khai Nga	༡༠༠	Cikja
200	༢༠༠	Kai Choe	༢༠༠	Nyija
300	༣༠༠	Khai Choe Nga	༣༠༠	Sumja
400	༤༠༠	Nyeeshy Theg/Shipja	༤༠༠	Zhipja
500	༥༠༠	Ngabja	༥༠༠	Ngapja
600	༦༠༠	Drukja	༦༠༠	Drupja
700	༧༠༠	Dinja	༧༠༠	Dünja
800	༨༠༠	Nyeesho Zone/Gopja	༨༠༠	Gäpja
900	༩༠༠	Gupja	༩༠༠	Gupja
1000	༡༠༠༠	Thonthra Theg/Chigtong	༡༠༠༠	Cikthong

External audio
- Khengzha numbers
- Dzongkha numbers

== Writing system ==
Khengkha is an oral language without its own written system. But it unofficially borrows from the Tibetan script and Uchen style of writing. Khengkha and Dzongkha numerical script are written the same.

== Related languages ==
Historically, Kheng and its speakers have had close contact with speakers of the Kurtöp, Nupbi and Bumthang languages, nearby languages of central and eastern Bhutan, to the extent that they may be considered part of a wider collection of "Bumthang languages".

== See also ==
- Languages of Bhutan
- Kheng people

== Bibliography ==
- Yangdzom, Deki; Arkesteijn, Marten (n.d.). Khengkha Lessonbook: Khengkha-English / English-Khengkha Wordlist. Thimphu: SNV, Bhutan.
- van Driem, George (2001). Languages of the Himalayas: An Ethnolinguistic Handbook of the Greater Himalayan Region: Containing an Introduction to the Symbiotic Theory of Language. Brill. p. 1412. ISBN 90-04-12062-9.
- van Driem, George (2007). "Endangerd Languages of Bhutan and Sikkim: East Bodish Languages". In Moseley, Christopher (ed.). Encyclopedia of the World's Endangered Languages. Routledge. pp. 295, 331. ISBN 978-0-7007-1197-0.
- Namgyel, Singye. The Language Web of Bhutan. Thimphu: KMT.
- van Driem, George L; Karma Tshering (1998). Dzongkha. Languages of the Greater Himalayan Region. Leiden: Research School CNWS, School of Asian, African, and Amerindian Studies. ISBN 90-5789-002-X.
