= East Bodish languages =

Language group in Bhutan

East Bodish
- Geographic distribution: Bhutan
- Ethnicity: Monpa people etc.
- Linguistic classification: Sino-Tibetan: Tibeto-Burman; Tibeto-Kanauri (?); Bodish; East Bodish

Language codes
- Glottolog: main1269

The East Bodish languages are a small group of non-Tibetic Bodish languages spoken in eastern Bhutan and adjacent areas of Tibet and Tawang. They include:

- Dakpa (Tawang Monpa)
- Dzala
- Nyen, including Mangde and Phobjib
- Chali
- Bumthang
- Kheng
- Kurtöp

== Overview ==
"Bod" (བོད) is the endonym for Tibet.

The term "East Bodish" first appeared in Shafer (1955). He classified "Dwags" (Takpa) into the "East Bodish Unit" within the Bodish Branch of Sino-Tibetan.

- Bodic Section
  - Bodish Branch
    - West Bodish Unit
    - Central Bodish Unit
    - South Bodish Unit
    - East Bodish Unit
  - Gurung Branch
  - Tshangla Branch
  - Rgyalrong Branch

Michael Aris mentioned the "Bum-thang" language spoken in areas such as "Tongsa", "Mangdelung", Kheng, and "Kurtö", which retains "the most archaic features of all the Bhutanese languages" George van Driem states that Bumthang, Kheng and Kurtöp could be considered dialects of a single language. Bhutanese anthropologist Kelzang Tashi treats Bumthang, Kheng, and Kurtöp as dialects of the language spoken by Üchogpa, which translates to the people of Central Bhutan

The East Bodish languages do not share certain lexical innovations with Old Tibetan (e.g. Tibetan bdun; Takpa nis for 'seven'). The branch is not a subgroup of Tibetic as defined by Nicolas Tournadre.

George van Driem initially proposed that 'Ole belonged to the group, but later decided that it belonged to a group of its own.

Although the East Bodish languages are closely related, Tshangla and related languages of eastern Bhutan, also called "Monpa" and predating Dzongkha, form a sister branch not to the East Bodish group, but to its parent Bodish branch. Thus the ambiguous term "Monpa" risks separating languages that should be grouped together, whereas grouping languages together that are quite distinct. Zakhring is apparently also related, though strongly influenced by Miju or a similar language.

Timotheus Bodt excludes Dakpa and Dzala, which he considers to be a single language, from the East Bodish languages. He finds Dakpa–Dzala to be closer to Tibetan than to other East Bodish languages. His resulting taxonomy is as follows:

- Bodic
  - Central Bodic
    - Dakpa–Dzala
    - "Bodish" (i.e. Tibetic)
  - East Bodic (non‑exhaustively)
    - Bumthang
    - Kheng
    - Kurtöp

=== Common characteristics in Bumthang, Kheng and Kurtöp ===
Bodt lists the following phonetic innovations undergone in Bumthang, Kheng, and Kurtöp in contrast to Dakpa–Dzala and Tibetan. Exceptions to these sound laws may be attributed to Tibetic contact.

==== Vowel height swaps ====
- Proto-Bodic *u became o in open syllables, but also conversely Proto-Bodic *o became u in most syllables (including open syllables).
- Proto-Bodic *i became e in open syllables.
- Any Proto-Bodic vowel following a palatalized consonant became /i/.

==== Changes to lateral consonants and clusters ====
- *l̥, which Bodt believes to be an outright /ɬ/, assibilated to /ɕ/.
- *l became /j/ before *a, *o and *u.
- *bl- became /(b)dʑ/, possibly through an intermediate /bj/.
- *kl- simplifies to *l-.
- *gl- becomes /ʑ/ and kʰl- becomes /ɕ/.
- *pl- does not have a consistent outcome; it can in one word develop an affricate or fricative but in another word remain unchanged.

==== Other changes ====
- *sw- > *kw- (in Bumthang, the *w is absorbed by the following vowel to form a rounded vowel and then lost).

==== Shared retentions ====
- Bumthang, Kheng and Kurtöp preserve onset *w, instead of changing it to /j/ like in Tibetan.
- They also do not palatalize *s before *i.

== Internal classification ==
Languages of Bhutan, including the East Bodish languages

Hyslop (2010) classifies the East Bodish languages as follows.

- East Bodish
  - Dakpa–Dzala
    - Dakpa
    - Dzala
  - (core branch)
    - Phobjip
    - Chali–Bumthang
      - Chali
      - Bumthangic
        - Bumthang
        - Kheng
        - Kurtöp

She regards the Dakpa–Dzala and Bumthangic subgroups as secure, and the placement of Phobjip and Chali as more tentative.

Lu (2002) divides the "Menba language" (门巴语) into the following subdivisions:

- Menba language
  - Southern: 30,000 speakers in Cona County, Lhoka (Shannan) Prefecture, Tibet
    - Mama dialect 麻玛土语: Mama Township 麻玛乡 (or 麻麻乡), Lebu District 勒布区
    - Dawang dialect 达旺土语: Dawang Township 达旺镇, Mendawang District 门达旺地区
  - Northern: 5,000 speakers in Mêdog County, Nyingchi Prefecture, Tibet
    - Wenlang dialect 文浪土语: Wenlang Township 文浪乡, Dexing District 德兴区
    - Banjin dialect 邦金土语: Bangjin District 邦金地区

== Reconstruction ==
Hyslop (2014) reconstructs the following Proto-East Bodish forms.

- *kwa 'tooth'
- *kra 'hair'
- *kak 'blood'
- *kʰrat 'waist'
- *lak 'hand'
- *ná 'nose'
- *pOskOm (?) 'knee'
- *rOs 'bone'
- *gO- 'head'
- *mE- 'eye'
- *kram 'otter'
- *ta 'horse'
- *kʰa- 'hen'
- *wam 'bear'
- *kʰwi 'dog'
- *kʰaça 'deer'
- *zV 'eat'
- *ra 'come'
- *gal 'go'
- *lok 'pour'
- *dot 'sleep'
- *bi 'give'
- *kʰar 'white'
- *mla 'arrow'
- *gor 'stone'
- *kʰwe/*tsʰi 'water'
- *rO (?) 'wind'
- *On (?) 'baby'
- *daŋ 'yesterday'
- *néŋ 'year'
- *da- 'today'
- *tʰek 'one'
- *sum 'three'
- *ble 'four'
- *laŋa 'five'
- *grok 'six'
- *nís 'seven'
- *gʲat 'eight'
- *dOgO 'nine'
- *kʰal(tʰek) 'twenty'
- *ŋa '1.SG'
- *i/*nVn '2.SG'
- *kʰi/*ba '3.SG'
- *-ma 'FUT'
- *lo 'Q.COP'

Additional reconstructions can be found in Hyslop (2016).
