= Bumthang language =

East Bodish language of north-central Bhutan

Bumthang
- Native to: Bhutan
- Native speakers: 20,000 (2011)
- Language family: Sino-Tibetan: Tibeto-Burman; Tibeto-Kanauri?; Bodish; EastBodish; Bumthang

Language codes
- ISO 639-3: kjz
- Glottolog: bumt1240
- Linguistic map of Bhutan, showing the location where Bumthang is spoken

The Bumthang language (Dzongkha: བུམ་ཐང་ཁ་, Wylie: bum thang kha; also called Bhumtam, Bumtang(kha), Bumtanp, Bumthapkha, and Kebumtamp) is an East Bodish language spoken by about 20,000 people in Bumthang and surrounding districts of Bhutan. Van Driem (1993) describes Bumthang as the dominant language of central Bhutan.

== Related languages ==
Historically, Bumthang and its speakers have had close contact with speakers of the Kurtöp, Nupbi and Kheng languages, nearby East Bodish languages of central and eastern Bhutan, to the extent that they may be considered part of a wider collection of "Bumthang languages."

Bumthang language is largely lexically similar with Kheng (98%), Nyen (75%–77%), and Kurtöp (70%–73%); but less so with Dzongkha (47%–52%) and Tshangla (40%–50%, also called "Sharchop"). It is either closely related to or identical with the Tawang language of the Monpa people of Tawang in India and China.

== Orthography ==
Bumthang is either written with the Tibetan or Romanized Dzongkha scripts.

Tibetan script	Romanization	Phonetic value
ཀ་	k	[k]
ཁ་	kh	[kʰ]
ག་	g	[g]
ང་	ng	[ŋ]
ཅ་	c	[c]
ཆ་	ch	[cʰ]
ཇ་	j	[ɟ]
ཉ་	ny	[ɲ]
པ་	p	[p]
ཕ་	ph	[pʰ]
བ་	b	[b]
མ་	m	[m]
ཏ་	t	[t̪]
ཐ་	th	[t̪ʰ]
ད་	d	[d̪]
ན་	n	[n̪]
ཏྲ་	tr	[ʈ]
ཐྲ་	thr	[ʈʰ]
དྲ་	dr	[ɖ]
ཙ་	ts	[t͡s]
ཚ་	tsh	[t͡sʰ]
ཛ་	dz	[d͡z]
ས་	s	[s]
ཟ་	z	[z]
ཤ་	sh	[ʃ]
ཞ་	zh	[ʒ]
ཤྲ་	shr	[r̥]
ཧྲ་	hr	[rʰ]
ཞྲ་	zhr	[ɼ]
ཝ་	w	[w]
ཡ་	y	[j]
ལ་	l	[l]
ལྷ་	lh	[l̥]
ར་	r	[r]
ཧ་	h	[h]
ཧྱ་	hy	[hʲ]
འ་	a	à
ཨ་	'a	á
འ་ེ	e	è
ཨ་ེ	'e	é

== Phonology ==
Bumthang consonants
		Bilabial	Dental	Alveolar	Retroflex	Palatal	Velar	Glottal
Plosive	voiceless	p	t̪ ⟨t⟩		ʈ ⟨tr⟩	c	k	
Plosive	voiced	b	d̪ ⟨d⟩		ɖ ⟨dr⟩	ɟ ⟨j⟩	g	
Plosive	aspirated				ʈʰ ⟨thr⟩	cʰ ⟨ch⟩	kʰ ⟨kh⟩	
Affricate				t͡s t͡sʰ ⟨tsh⟩ d͡z				
Fricative	voiceless			s		ʃ ⟨sh⟩		h hʲ ⟨hy⟩
Fricative	voiced			z		ʒ ⟨zh⟩		
Approximant		w				j ⟨y⟩		
Nasal		m	n̪ ⟨n⟩			ɲ ⟨ny⟩	ŋ ⟨ng⟩	
Lateral				l l̥ ⟨lh⟩				
Trill				r̥ ⟨shr⟩ r rʰ ⟨hr⟩	ɽ ⟨zhr⟩			

There are also thirteen vowels:

Bumthang vowels
	Front	Back
Close	i iː ⟨î⟩ yː ⟨ü⟩	u uː ⟨û⟩
Mid	e eː ⟨ê⟩ œː ⟨ö⟩	o oː ⟨ô⟩
Open	æ ⟨ä⟩	ɑ ⟨a⟩ ɑː ⟨â⟩

There is a high register tone and a low register tone. Syllables with a high register tone are preceded by a ' mark.

== Grammar ==
Bumthang is an ergative–absolutive language. The ergative case is not used on every transitive subject, but, like in many other languages of the region shows some optionality, discussed in detail by Donohue & Donohue (2016). Using the ergative denotes a high degree of agentivity of the subject.

Personal pronouns in Bumthang
	Absolutive		Ergative		Genitive		Dative	
	singular	plural	singular	plural	singular	plural	singular	plural
1st	ngat	nget	ngai (ngaile)	ngei (ngeile)	ngae (ngale)	nge (ngele, ngegi)	ngado	ngedo
2st	wet	yin	wi (wile)	yinle	we (wele)	yinde	wedo	yindu
3rd	khit	bot	khi (khile)	boi (boile)	khi (khile)	böegi (boeli)	khidu	bodo

The plural suffix in nouns is -tshai. Adjectives follow nouns. The ergative suffix in nouns is -le, while in personal pronouns it is -i. The ergative suffix may follow the collective suffix gampo. The genitive may take on the suffix -rae (e.g. we-rae 'your own'). The telic suffix -QO, where both Q (realized as [k], [g], [ng], [t], or [d]) and O take on a different value based on the final consonant and vowel of a word, denotes the goal of a situation which the word is directed to (e.g. Thimphuk-gu 'to Thimphu', yam-do 'on the way'). Distinct from the telic, the locative suffix -na (e.g. yak-na 'in the hand').

=== Numeral system ===
The numeral system of Bumthang is largely base-20. The numeral thek 'one' is also used to denote 'a/an, a certain one'.

Bumthang numerals
Numeral	Bumthang	Numeral	Bumthang	Numeral	Bumthang
1	thek	11	chwaret	21	khaethek neng thek
2	zon	12	chwa'nyit	22	khaethek neng zon
3	sum	13	chusum	40	khaezon
4	ble	14	cheble	60	khaesum
5	yanga	15	chänga	400	nyishuthek
6	grok	16	chöegrok	420	nyishuthek neng tsathek
7	nyit	17	cher'nyit	440	nyishuthek neng tsazon
8	jat	18	charjat	481	nyishuthek neng tsable doma thek
9	dogo	19	chöedogo	800	nyishuzon
10	che	20	khaethek	8000	khaechenthek

=== Verbs ===
The finite verb is inflected for tense, aspect, and evidentiality. Mood is usually marked by an auxiliary. TAM categories include the present, the experienced past, the inferred past, the experienced imperfective, the periphrastic perfect, the infinitival future, the volitional future, the supine, the gerund, the adhortative, and the optative.

==== Present ====
Present-tense (incompletive in Donohue's system) forms are formed with a suffix containing a coronal consonant followed by a. Each dialect has wildly differing, but generally phonologically conditioned systems governing exactly which consonant does the present suffix begin with.

Van Driem also notes a "hard" vs. "soft" stem among open syllables, with "hard" open syllables taking different ending allomorphs than "soft" ones.

Bumthang present-tense formations by dialect
Dialect	Condition	Suffix
Chogor	After closed syllables and hard open syllables	-da
Chogor	After soft open syllables	-tda
Tang	After -p, -k, -m, or -ng	-sa
Tang	After soft open syllables or -t	-ta
Tang	After hard open syllables	-za
Tang	After -n	-da
'Ura	After a voiceless final consonant	-sa
'Ura	Elsewhere	-za
Chunmat	After -p, -t, -k, -m, or -ng	-sa
Chunmat	After soft open syllables	-ta
Chunmat	After hard open syllables or -n	-za

The present form is negated by preceding the verb root with me (mi in Chunmat).

==== Experienced past ====
The experienced past (or personal perfective in Donohue's notation) is used to express past events that the speaker (or second-person addressee) themselves personally witnessed or experienced happening.

The experienced past is marked with either -s or no ending attached to the verb root; the distribution of the two markers varies by dialect. Root-final -k is also deleted in the experienced past in many dialects.

Bumthang experienced past formations by dialect
Dialect(s)	Condition	Suffix
Chogor and Chutö	After root-final velar consonants (-k is deleted)	(no ending)
Chogor and Chutö	Elsewhere	-s (root-final -t is deleted)
'Ura and non-Chutö Tang	Everywhere (root-final -t is deleted)	-s
Chunmat	After -t or soft open stems (root-final -t is deleted)	-s
Chunmat	Elsewhere (root-final -k is deleted)	(no ending)

The experienced past in -s cannot be negated. Instead, to form a negative experienced past form with the negative prefix ma, -t is suffixed to the verb root after soft open stems. After other types of stems, no suffix is attached.

In non-'Ura dialects, the verb gai "to go" irregularly forms its experienced past with -e. On the other hand, in 'Ura, gai simply takes the regular -s.

Examples of experienced past formations in Bumthang
Verb root	Meaning	Dialect			Negative forms
Verb root	Meaning	Chogor	'Ura	Chunmat	Negative forms
bi	"to give"	bi-s	bi-s	bi-s	ma-bi-t
zu	"to eat"	zu-s	zu-s	zu-s	ma-zu-t
tshü	"to seek"	tshü-s	tshü-s	tshü	ma-tshü
khrak	"to arrive"	khra	khrak-s	hra	ma-khrak
thong	"to drink"	thong	thong-s	thong	ma-thong
lap	"to say"	lap-s	lap-s	lap	ma-lap
dot	"to sleep"	do-s	do-s	do-s	ma-dot
gai	"to go"	gai-e	gai-s	gai-e	ma-gai

==== Inferred past ====
The inferred past (impersonal perfective in Donohue's work) is used to indicate a past event that the speaker did not personally witness occurring, but can infer to have happened based on leftover evidence. In all verbs, the inferred past is formed with the suffix -na (in Chogor and Chunmat), -zumut ('Ura) or -simut (non-Chutö Tang) after the verb root. The inferred past is negated by having ma precede the affirmative form.

The contrast between experienced and inferred past forms can be exemplified as follows, with both phrases translating to "he has eaten" and featuring the verb zu "to eat":

- Chit zus, in the experienced past, implies that the speaker saw the subject eat something.
- Chit zuna, in the inferred past, implies the speaker did not see the subject eat something but can deduce that eating had occurred, e.g. due to the disappearance of food the subject had eaten.

==== Experienced imperfective ====
The experienced imperfective is formed by suffixing -sa or -ba to the verb root; the former occurs after soft open-syllable verbs, and the latter elsewhere. The suffix -ba may be lenited to -wa in fast speech. The experienced imperfective cannot be negated; instead the negative experienced past form is used.

==== Nominalizer -i ====
The nominalizer -i can be attached to the experienced imperfective to form what Van Driem calls the past participle. In negative phrases, -i becomes -i-gi after soft open-stem verbs and -gi elsewhere.

The past participle has two functions:

- To create verbal modifiers for nouns;
- To create periphrastic constructions with the copulas wen (in the affirmative) and min (in the negative). They denote perfect aspect, and are also used in phrases declaring the identity of the perpetrator of a past event.

The nominalizer -i can also be suffixed to the infinitival future to allow the infinitival future to modify a noun.

==== Infinitival future ====
The infinitival future (or personal irrealis in Donohue's work) is formed with the suffix -mala (in Chogor and Chunmat) or -sang (in 'Ura and some of Tang). It is used to denote events that may happen in the future.

The infinitival future can be followed by the copula wen to indicate a planned event.

==== Volitional future ====
The volitional future, in contrast to the infinitival future, indicates an action that the subject either intends to do or is confident will happen in the future. It is formed with the suffix -ge. Van Driem exemplifies the contrast between the two futures with the following pair:

Wet nyit-mala, wen-na?
you stay-FUT.INF COP-INTERR
"You're going to stay on, aren't you?"

Wet nyit-ge, wen-na?
you stay-FUT.VOL COP-INTERR
"You intend to stay on, aren't you?"

The negative volitional future is formed with the negative prefix me (or mi in Chunmat). The suffix -ge is omitted in the negative unless the evidential marker -na is present.

==== Supine ====
The supine (or infinitive in Donohue's work) is formed with a suffix in the shape -CV (a consonant followed by a vowel) whose form varies depending on the phonetics of the verb root.

- The vowel of the suffix is o everywhere except after a high vowel /i/ or /u/; in that case the suffix vowel becomes u.
- The consonant of the suffix is:
  - -g- after -k, e.g. pok-go "to beat (someone) up".
  - -ng- after -ng, e.g. thong-ngo "to drink" and yung-ngu "to fetch".
  - -t- after -p, e.g. thap-to "to argue" and tup-tu "to cut".
  - -r- after soft open-syllable roots, like in zu-ru "to eat" and se-ro "to die".
  - -d- elsewhere.

The supine is used to form verbal complements to verbs like gai "to go", tshuk "can, to be able", and 'nyam "to feel like (doing)". Examples from Van Driem include:

lap-to gai-ge
tell-INF go-FUT.VOL
"we'll go tell them"

ngat churma thong-ngo me-tshuk-sa
1SG beer drink-INF NEG-be.able-PRES
"I can't drink beer"

gai-do 'nyam-da
go-INF feel.like-PRES
"I feel like going"

==== Imperative ====
The imperative mood, used to express commands, is indicated via a suffix that is underlyingly -lae (which may be contracted to -lä in rapid speech). This suffix has many allomorphs:

- Root-final -t is deleted in the imperative, so dot "to sleep" and sut "to kill" form do-lae "sleep!" and su-lae "kill!".
- -lae becomes -mae after -m, e.g. in num "to sniff, smell" with imperative num-mae "sniff!".
- The -l- in the imperative suffix is lost after -ng, -k, and -p. -k and -p, in turn, become voiced to -g- and -b-. For instance:
  - yang "to stand" forms the imperative yang-ae "stand up!"
  - pok "to beat" forms the imperative pog-ae "beat!"
  - tup "to cut" forms the imperative tub-ae "cut!"
- Soft open-syllable verbs have particularly volatile imperative formation. Donohue posits an underlying -e suffix.
  - This suffix may be lost if the root vowel is already e, or coalesce into a diphthong ye like in se "to die", where Donohue reports imperatives sye and se.
  - If the soft-stem verb ends in a i or u, Donohue and Van Driem do not agree on the result. Van Driem observes that the verb root vowel is changed to e or ö, respectively. On the other hand, Donohue says that i soft-stem verbs are suffixed with -ye, while u/o soft-stem verbs have the u or o of the root coalesce with the -e suffix to form -we.
  - -e fuses with -a to form -ai. Thus, tsha "to see" forms the imperative tshai "see!".
- Irregular imperatives include wai (for o "to bring"), hrai (for ra "to come"), and ga-lae (for gai "to go").

==== Gerund ====
The gerund (or sequential in Donohue's work) is used to mark events that occurred at the same time as, or just immediately before, the action of the main verb. It is also used to form the verbal complement of zat "to finish". It is marked with the suffix -se (or in Chunmat, -si or -zi) after the verb root.

Examples of the gerund include:

Mai hram-se gai-e.
house demolish-GER go-PST.EXP
"After they demolished the house, they left."

Yigu dri-se za-s.
letter write-GER finish-PST.EXP
"I am done writing."

==== Adhortative ====
The ending -kya is suffixed to verb roots to form adhortative phrases that encourage others to do something. For example, gai "to go" forms the adhortative gai-kya "let's go".

==== Optative ====
The optative mood is indicated with an ending -ga in most dialects. Some dialects instead have the optative ending -(n)ja, which manifests as -nja after open syllables (both hard and soft) and -ja after other syllables.

==== Hearsay evidential ====
Bumthang has two particles that mark hearsay that follow the verb; they are shu for interrogative phrases and re for non-interrogative phrases.

== See also ==
- Languages of Bhutan
- Bumthang District
- Bumthang Province
- Kingdom of Bumthang

== Bibliography ==
- van Driem, George (1995). Grammar of Bumthang - A Language of Central Bhutan. Dzongkha Development Commission.
- van Driem, George. 2015. Synoptic grammar of the Bumthang language. Himalayan Linguistics. Open access
