= Ethnic groups in Bhutan =

Numerous ethnic groups inhabit Bhutan, with the Ngalop people who speak the Dzongkha language being a majority of the Bhutanese population. The Bhutanese are of four main ethnic categories, which themselves are not necessarily exclusive – the politically and culturally dominant Ngalop of western and northern Bhutan, the Sharchop of eastern Bhutan, the Lhotshampa concentrated in southern Bhutan, and Bhutanese tribal and aboriginal peoples living in villages scattered throughout Bhutan.

== Ngalop ==
The Ngalop (meaning "earliest risen" or "first converted" according to folk etymology) are people of Tibetan origin who migrated to Bhutan as early as the 9th century. The Ngalop introduced Tibetan culture and Buddhism to Bhutan and are the dominant political and cultural element in modern Bhutan. Their language, Dzongkha, is the national language and is descended from Old Tibetan. The Ngalop are dominant in western and northern Bhutan, including Thimphu and the Dzongkha-speaking region.

== Sharchop ==
The Sharchop (meaning "easterner"), are the populations of mixed Tibetan and Southeast Asian descent who mostly live in the eastern districts of Bhutan. Van Driem (1993) indicates the Sharchop and closely related aboriginal Monpa (Menba) are descendants of the plurality ethnicity of Bhutan and the principal pre-Tibetan (pre-Dzongkha) peoples of that country. The Sharchop account for most of the population of eastern Bhutan. Although long the biggest single ethnic group in Bhutan, the Sharchop have been largely assimilated into the Tibetan-Ngalop culture. Most Sharchop speak Tshangla, a Tibeto-Burman language. They traditionally practice slash-and-burn and tsheri agriculture, planting dry rice crops for three or four years until the soil is exhausted and then moving on, but the practice has been officially banned since 1969.

== Lhotshampa ==
The Lhotshampa (southern borderlanders ) in Bhutan are a diverse umbrella community rather than a single homogeneous group, encompassing multiple subgroups with roots across both Indo-Aryan and Tibeto-Burman language families.

The Lhotshampa community includes both Indo-Aryan and Tibeto-Burman ethnic groups, each with its own language.

Indo-Aryan Communities in southern Bhutan—such as the Bahun (Brahmin) and Chhetri speak Nepali (an Indo-Aryan language) as their mother tongue.

Tibeto-Burman Communities in southern Bhutan—such as the Gurung, Rai, Limbu, Magar, Lepcha, Tamang and Sherpa—belong to the Tibeto-Burman language family. Historically, each of these groups spoke its own distinct language.

Over time, however, the majority of Tibeto-Burman communities in southern Bhutan have lost their mother tongues and adopted Nepali, the mother tongue of the Bahun and Chhetri communities, as their primary language.

The Lhotshampa are generally classified as Hindus. This is an oversimplification, as many groups that include the Tamang and the Gurung are largely Buddhist; the Kiranti groups that include the Rai and Limbu are largely animist followers of Mundhum (these latter groups are mainly found in south western Bhutan).

Traditionally, Lhotshampa have been involved mostly in sedentary agriculture.The most divisive issue in Bhutan in the 1980s and early 1990s was the accommodation of the Nepalese Hindu minority. The government traditionally attempted to limit immigration and restrict residence and employment of Nepalese to the southern region. Liberalization measures in the 1970s and 1980s encouraged intermarriage and provided increasing opportunities for public service. More in-country migration by Nepalese seeking better education and business opportunities was allowed. However, through the late 1980s and 1990s, as many as 107,000 Lhotshampa were forcibly deported or fled Bhutan for Nepal in fear of persecution though the exact numbers are debated and questionable. Many Bhutanese refugees still reside in UNHCR refugee camps in Nepal, though many have been resettled to western countries.

== Indigenous and tribal groups ==
Small aboriginal or indigenous tribal peoples live in scattered villages throughout Bhutan. They include the Brokpa and Doya tribes as well as the descendants of slaves brought to Bhutan from similar tribal areas in India. Some like the Black Mountain Monpa are said to represent the aboriginal people of Bhutan, while some like the Brokpa probably originally migrated from Tibet. Together, the Ngalop, Sharchop, and tribal groups constituted up to 72 percent of the population in the late 1980s according to official Bhutanese statistics. The CIA Factbook, however, estimates Ngalop and Sharchop populations together to total about 50 percent, with indigenous and migrant tribes constituting 15 percent – or 65 percent altogether.

== Tibetans ==
Bhutan also had a sizable modern Tibetan refugee population, although there are no Tibetan communities or villages in the country. The total Tibetan population stood at 10,000 in 1987. The major influx of 6,000 persons came in 1959 in the wake of the 1959 Tibetan Rebellion. The Tibetan expatriates became only partially integrated into Bhutanese society. Perceiving a lack of allegiance to the state on the part of Tibetans, the government decided in 1979 to expel those who refused residency. India, after some reluctance, acceded to the move and accepted more than 3,100 Tibetans between 1980 and 1985. The Tibetans were separated into three groups. The first two groups of Tibetans were sent to India and have found their own community. However the third group is still in Bhutan. They do not have a Bhutanese passport because they were part of a group that wanted to leave Bhutan. However, there are other Tibetans who have Bhutanese residency because they accepted the offer to live in Bhutan instead of going to India. Although Bhutan traditionally welcomed refugees—and still accepted a few new ones fleeing the 1989 unrest in Tibet—official governmental policy in the late 1980s was to refuse more Tibetan refugees.

1. Ngalop people and Sharchop people (63.0%)
2. Lhotsampas (also known as Nepalis) (22.0%)
3. Indigenous or migrant ethnic groups (15.0%)

== See also ==
- Ngalop
- Sharchop
- Lhotshampa
- Lepcha
- Demographics of Bhutan
- Languages of Bhutan
- Immigration in Bhutan
- Bhutanese refugees
