= Immigration to Bhutan =

Immigration to Bhutan has an extensive history and has become one of the country's most contentious social, political, and legal issues. Since the twentieth century, Bhutanese immigration and citizenship laws have been promulgated as acts of the royal government, often by decree of the Druk Gyalpo on advice of the rest of government. Immigration policy and procedure are implemented by the Lhengye Zhungtshog (Council of Ministers) Ministry of Home and Cultural Affairs, Department of Immigration. Bhutan's first modern laws regarding immigration and citizenship were the Bhutanese Citizenship Act 1958 and subsequent amendments in 1977. The 1958 Act was superseded by the Bhutanese Citizenship Act 1985, which was then supplemented by a further Immigration Act in 2007. The Constitution of 2008 included some changes in Bhutan's immigration laws, policy, and procedure, however prior law not inconsistent with the 2008 Constitution remained intact. Bhutan's modern citizenship laws and policies reinforce the institution of the Bhutanese monarchy, require familiarity and adherence to Ngalop social norms, and reflect the social impact of the most recent immigrant groups.

== Historical overview ==
Historically, there have been at least five distinct waves of human migration into Bhutan. Before Tibetans settled in Bhutan, the area was populated by aboriginal people referred to as "Monpa". The first record of human movement into Bhutan is the settlement of the region by Tibetan Buddhists, who were thoroughly established by 600 CE. Their current autonym is "Ngalop".

The second wave is represented by the Sharchops, who arrived from Burma or Assam sometime in the first millennium.

The third wave of human migration was that of Nepalis and Indians as craftsmen, migrant workers, and slaves in the late nineteenth and early twentieth centuries.

A fourth, much smaller wave of Tibetans came to Bhutan, beginning in 1959, followed fifth by continued immigration from India and Nepal during Bhutan's development projects in the 1960s despite a government ban in 1958.

== Immigration law and policy ==
Toward the end of the reign of the second King Jigme Wangchuck in the 1950s, the numbers of new immigrants had swelled causing tension between the King and the Dorji family in the Bhutan House. Amnesty was given through the Citizenship Act of 1958 – Bhutan's first modern laws regarding immigration and citizenship – for all those who could prove their presence in Bhutan for at least 10 years prior to 1958. On the other hand, the government also banned further immigration in 1958. The Act was pronounced by the Druk Gyalpo King Jigme Dorji Wangchuck among a series of legal and social reforms in 1958 designed to begin modernizing Bhutan, including the abolition of slavery. The 1958 Act defined Bhutanese citizenship in patrilineal terms, and provided a basic framework for the process of naturalization in Bhutan. Initially, applicants other than wives of Bhutanese citizens were required to show a ten-year residency, five years of service to the government, and ownership of agricultural land. The 1958 Act originally defined no procedural framework for immigration. It also allowed the King to make ad hoc changes to the law, and left decisions largely to the discretion of the King and government officials.

In 1977, an amendment lengthened the residency requirement for naturalization to 20 years (15 years if in service to Bhutan), and the requirement of owning agricultural land was eschewed. Deprivation of citizenship as a punishment for sedition was expanded to associates and family relatives of seditious citizens. The amendment introduced other requirements, such as knowledge of Dzongkha and adherence to Ngalop customs. The amendment also introduced a procedural framework for citizenship and naturalization; namely it codified procedural requirements for census registration and births abroad and designated the Ministry of Home Affairs as the government agency to oversee immigration matters. The 1958 Act and 1977 amendments were superseded by the Bhutanese Citizenship Act 1985, though much of the procedural framework established in 1977 remains de jure in effect because it was not overridden.

Since the Bhutanese Citizenship Act of 1985 and subsequent Immigration Act of 2007, immigration policy and procedure have been implemented by the Lhengye Zhungtshog (Council of Ministers), Ministry of Home and Cultural Affairs, Department of Immigration. Procedural safeguards for both naturalization and bona fide citizenship remained largely absent: applicants could be rejected for no reason at all, such decisions were final and binding, and even bona fide Bhutanese citizens faced deprivation of citizenship for sedition. Placement and maintaining one's placement in the national census registry is of central importance to legitimizing and proving one's citizenship. Placement by government workers into census registry categories, which ranged from "Genuine Bhutanese" to "Non-nationals: Migrants and Illegal Settlers," has been arbitrary, and could be arbitrarily changed. In some cases members of the same family have been, and still are, placed in different categories. Furthermore, only the entries recorded at the Dzongkhag (second highest) level are deemed valid; official local Dungkhag, Gewog, Chewog or other civil records are disregarded. Under the latest Immigration Act of 2007, department-level immigration officers were given a mandate, and left wide discretion, to enter private premises; examine documents, persons, and things; seize items; and arrest persons. These officers are immunized under the 2007 Act for all wrongful acts and omissions committed in good faith in the discharge of their duty.

Bhutanese immigration policy, as reflected in its citizenship laws, can be described as highly assimilatory, requiring familiarity with the dominant Ngalop culture and allegiance to the Ngalop King of Bhutan. Its broader citizenship policy toward both immigrants and citizens alike can also be described as assimilatory, and on its face, a tool against dissent.

== History ==
Historically, there have been at least five distinct waves of human migration into Bhutan: two ancient and three since the 19th century. These migrant groups have, to varying degrees, shaped Bhutanese society, culture, and politics. They have also assimilated into the dominant Tibetan-Ngalop culture to varying degrees, one of the foremost concerns of modern Bhutanese immigration policy.

=== Indigenous peoples and ancient migrations ===
Before Tibetans settled Bhutan, much of the region was populated by the aboriginal Monpa who practiced the shamanistic Bön religion. Earliest records to the area which the Monpas inhabited today indicated the existence of a kingdom known as Monyul or Lhomon from 500 BC to 600 AD. Monyul spanned the areas of Eastern Bhutan, Tawang, Kameng and Southern Tibet. However, it remained thinly populated throughout its history. By the 7th century, Monyul had come under increasing Tibetan political and cultural influence. King Songtsen Gampo, who ruled Tibet from AD 627–649, was responsible for the construction of Bhutan's oldest surviving Buddhist temples, the Kyichu Lhakhang in Paro and the Jambay Lhakhang in Bumthang.

The Sharchop (meaning "easterner"), are thought to have migrated next from Assam or Burma during the past millennium. Sharchop is a collective term for the populations of mixed Southeast Asian and South Asian descent found in the eastern districts of Bhutan.

A few other indigenous groups, however, remained largely beyond the pale of Tibetan settlement and cultural influence. Among these are the Tibetan Buddhist Lhop and Hindu Toto people in the southwest. In the north the Tephoos, who immigrated from what is now known as India are a distinct community of the Hindu Koches and are found in the north of Bhutan. The Oraon are a Dravidian language speaking tribal group found in southwestern Bhutan.

In the seventeenth century, a Tibetan expatriate Drukpa monk, Ngawang Namgyal established a theocratic government independent of political influence from Tibet proper, and premodern Bhutan emerged. Ngawang Namgyal arrived in Bhutan in 1616 seeking refuge from the domination of the Gelugpa sect led by the Dalai Lama in Lhasa. He established a new base in western Bhutan, founding Cheri Monastery at the head of Thimphu valley. In 1627 he built Simtokha Dzong at the entrance to Thimphu valley. From this dzong he exerted control over traffic between the powerful Paro valley to the west and Trongsa valley to the east. In the 1634 Battle of Five Lamas, Ngawang Namgyal prevailed over the Tibetan and Bhutanese forces allied against him and was the first to unite Bhutan into a single country. He took the title shabdrung, becoming the temporal and spiritual leader of Bhutan under a dual system of government. He promulgated a code of law, the Tsa Yig, and built a network of impregnable dzongs, a system that helped bring local lords under centralized control and strengthened the country against Tibetan invasions. Thus, more than 1,000 years of Tibetan influence and migration into the region brought about the formation of Bhutan.

Today, the term Ngalop refers to those Bhutanese of ancient Tibetan descent who came to dominate Bhutan culturally and politically. The Ngalop are concentrated in the western and central valleys of Bhutan. They practice mostly Tibetan Buddhism and speak Dzongkha. The Sharchop comprise most of the population of eastern Bhutan. Although long the biggest ethnic group in Bhutan, the Sharchop have largely assimilated into the Tibetan-Ngalop culture.

=== Immigration from Nepal and India ===
Since Bhutan emerged as an independent state, the most significant immigrant groups have been from Nepal and India. These people are collectively called Lhotshampa (meaning "southerner"), though a collective name may present an oversimplification because of the diversity within the group. The first reports of people of Nepalese origin in Bhutan was around 1620, when Shabdrung Ngawang Namgyal commissioned Newar craftsmen from the Kathmandu valley in Nepal to make a silver stupa to contain the ashes of his father Tempa Nima. The Newar are an ethnic group distinct from the Bahuns, Tamangs, Gurungs, Rais that form the Lhotsampa community.

The next small groups of Nepalese emigrated primarily from eastern Nepal under British Indian auspices in the late nineteenth and early twentieth centuries. Members of many ethnic groups, including forefathers of Lhotshampa and others from Sikkim, the Assam Duars, and West Bengal, were brought into Bhutan as slaves (the institution was abolished in 1958). Seasonal migrants commonly worked in the Bhutan Duars, and began to settle in the 1880s. During the late 19th Century, contractors working for the Bhutanese government began to organise the settlement of Nepali-speaking people in uninhabited areas of southern Bhutan in order to open those areas up for cultivation. The south soon became the country's main supplier of food. By 1930, according to British colonial officials, much of the south was under cultivation by a population of Nepali origin that amounted to some 60,000 people.

Settlement in Bhutan of large numbers of people from Nepal happened for the first time in the early 20th century. This settlement was encouraged by the Bhutan House in Kalimpong for the purpose of collecting taxes for the government. In the 1930s, the Bhutan House settled 5,000 families of Nepali workers in Tsirang alone. In the 1940s, the British Political Officer Sir Basil Gould was quoted as saying that when he warned Sir Raja Sonam Topgay Dorji of Bhutan House of the potential danger of allowing so many ethnic Nepalese to settle in southern Bhutan, he replied that "since they were not registered subjects they could be evicted whenever the need arose." Furthermore, Lhotshampa were forbidden from settling north of the subtropical foothills. The beginning of Nepalese immigration largely coincided with Bhutan's political development: in 1885, Druk Gyalpo Ugyen Wangchuck consolidated power after a period of civil unrest and cultivated closer ties with the British in India. In 1910, the government of Bhutan signed a treaty with the British in India, granting them control over Bhutan's foreign relations.

=== Tibetan refugees in Bhutan (1959) ===
In 1959, Bhutan granted asylum to several thousand refugees after the Chinese took control of Tibet. The Tibetan refugees were fleeing famine, uprising, suppression, and persecution during Chinese Chairman Mao Zedong's Great Leap Forward. Chinese demographers have estimated that 90,000 Tibetans became refugees. The people of Bhutan deeply sympathized with the refugees and extended assistance as much as possible within their capacity. Those Tibetan refugees renounced the right to return to Tibet were granted Bhutanese citizenship, however the majority told Bhutanese authorities they would like to return to Tibet one day. As a result, they remained refugees.

In 1981, many Tibetan refugees in Bhutan chose to permanently resettle in India and they were allowed to do so. About half of the initial Tibetan refugees chose to remain in Bhutan and continued to live in these in seven settlements located across Bhutan. The seven Tibetan settlements in Bhutan are: Khunpheling (village of Karche), Namling (village of Badgarnang), Yidmonling (village of Lhongtso), Raptenling, Kunga Rabtenling, Kelsangling, and Kungaling. Most of settlements have a small monastery, a primary school, and a small heath clinic.

In 1998, there were about 1,500 Tibetans living in Bhutan, and in 2007 there were about 1,883.

Life remains relatively difficult for Tibetan refugees in Bhutan. Without a security clearance — something they claim is virtually impossible to obtain — Tibetans cannot get government jobs, enrol their children in higher education or obtain licenses to run private business. Many get around that rule by renting shop licenses off native Bhutanese, but it leaves them in an uncomfortable limbo.

=== Immigration from Nepal and India (1959–present) ===
Immigrants from Nepal and India continued to enter Bhutan during the 1960s when Bhutan's first modern 5-year plans began. Like the prior Nepalese immigrants, they came to be called Lhotshampa, blurring the line between citizens, legal residents, and persons illegally present.

From 1961 onward, with Indian support, the government began planned developmental activities consisting of significant infrastructure projects. Uncomfortable with India's desire to bring in large numbers of workers from India, the government initially tried to prove its own capacity by insisting that the planned Thimphu-Phuntsholing highway be done with its own workforce. However, the import of workers from India was inevitable; most Bhutanese worked as farmers and were unwilling to take up the major infrastructure projects. Thus, most development and infrastructure laborers were of Nepali origin.

The government traditionally attempted to limit immigration and restrict residence and employment of Nepalese to the southern region. Liberalization measures in the 1970s and 1980s encouraged intermarriage and provided increasing opportunities for public service. The government allowed more internal migration by Nepalese seeking better education and business opportunities. Large-scale assimilation into Tibetan-Ngalop culture, however, has not occurred among the Nepalese as it did among other groups.

By the late 1980s, the Bhutanese government estimated 28 percent of the Bhutanese population were of Nepalese origin, though without distinguishing between earlier and later immigrants. Unofficial estimates of the ethnic Nepalese population ran as high as 30 to 40 percent, constituting a majority in the south. The number of legal permanent Nepalese residents in the late 1980s may have been as few as 15 percent of the total Nepalese population, however.

==== Bhutanese refugees ====
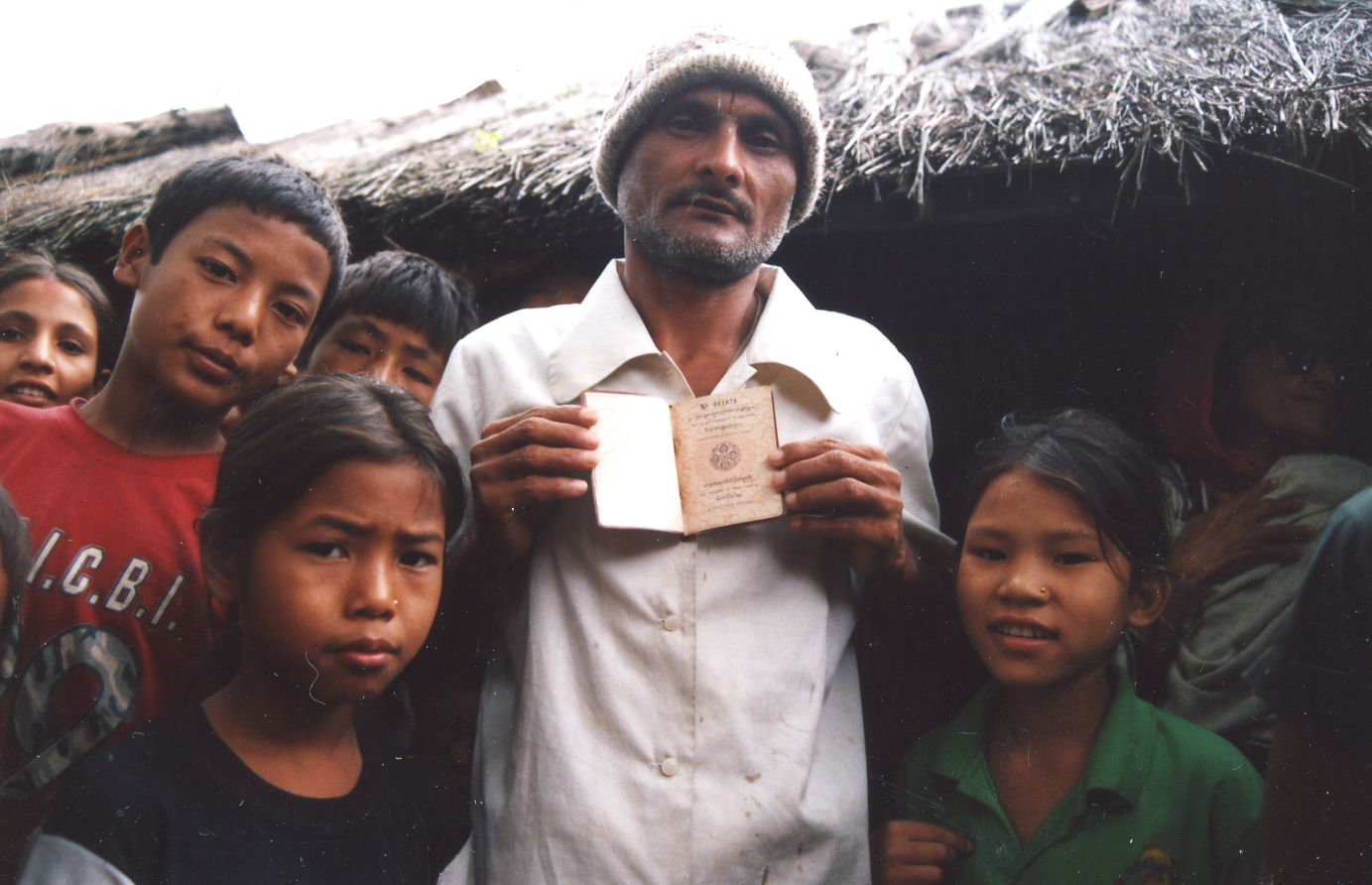
Bhutanese refugees

In 1988, the government census revealed that the "Ngalop" population were very close to becoming the minority in the country in comparison to the "Lhotshampa".The results of the 1988 census led the government to adopt "Ngalop" cultural traditions as the National norm in order to preserve the existing culture. In 1989, the Bhutanese government enacted reforms that directly impacted the Lhotshampa. First, it elevated the status of the national dress code of the Driglam namzha from recommended to mandatory. All citizens including the Lhotshampa were required to observe the Ngalop dress code in public during business hours. This decree was resented by the Lhotshampa, who voiced complaints about being forced to wear the clothing of the Ngalop majority. Second, the government removed Nepali as a language of instruction in schools in favor of Dzongkha, the national language. This alienated the Lhotshampa, many of whom knew no Dzongkha at all.

In 1990, violent ethnic unrest and anti-government protests occurred in southern Bhutan, pressing for greater democracy and respect for minority rights. That year, the Bhutan Peoples' Party, whose members are mostly Lhotshampa, began a campaign of violence against the Bhutanese government. In the wake of this unrest, thousands fled Bhutan. The people who were exiled or fled consist not only of the "Lhotshampa" individuals but also many "Ngalop" individuals who aided in the violence against the government. Many of them have either entered Nepal's seven refugee camps (on January 20, 2010, 85,544 refugees resided in the camps) or are working in India. According to U.S. State Department estimates, about 35 percent of the population of Bhutan is Lhotshampa, if the displaced refugees are counted as citizens.

== See also ==
- Illegal immigration to Bhutan
- Demographics of Bhutan
  - Monpa people
  - Ngalop
  - Sharchop
  - Lhotshampa
- Tibetan diaspora
- Slavery in Bhutan
- Bhutanese refugees
- Politics of Bhutan
- Bhutanese Citizenship Act 1985
- Cultural assimilation
- Bhutanese diaspora
