= Slavery in Bhutan =

Slavery in Bhutan was a common legal, economic, and social institution until its abolition in 1958. In historical records, unfree labourers in Bhutan were referred to as slaves, coolies, and serfs. These labourers originated mostly in and around Bhutan, Assam, and Sikkim, and were the backbone of Bhutan's pre-money feudal economy.

Bhutan abolished slavery as part of modernization reforms at the behest of the Third Druk Gyalpo Jigme Dorji Wangchuck, who ascended to the throne in 1952 at the age of 25. In breaking with slavery and feudalism, King Jigme Dorji enacted legal reforms, awarding citizenship and outright ownership of land to former slaves.

== History ==
Before the introduction of a money economy in the 19th century and modernization programs in the mid-20th century, the economy of Bhutan was based entirely on payment in kind and in labour, including unfree labour. In the feudal land tenure system, in which all land was held by the sovereign and populated by tenants, serfdom and service to mesne lords was commonplace. Ordinary citizens, for their part, were bound by the driglam namzha to do work such as dzong construction as part of their tax obligation to the state. The gradual transition to a feudal money economy was prompted by Bhutanese military and territorial losses to the East India Company, which resulted in annual cash subsidies to the Bhutanese government. These money revenues eventually replaced unfree labour as the backbone of the Bhutanese economy.

Bhutan had an underclass of prisoners of war and their descendants, who were generally treated as serfs or even as slaves. This class of slave was the most common, however many others were aboriginal or indigenous tribal peoples originally living in scattered villages throughout Bhutan. Criminal freemen facing capital punishment were sometimes spared and made slaves for life. Slave status was inherited, and the value of slaves varied according to age, caste, and sex; an adult high-caste male cost about 20 Rupees at market, while a low-caste female could sell for 3 Rupees. During the 18th century, hundreds of Brahmins were imported as slaves into Bhutan every year.

By the 19th century, Bhutan had developed a slave trade with Sikkim and Tibet. During this time, the kidnapping of British subjects as slaves, as well as the repatriation of escaped Bhutanese slaves, became major points of contention amid rising hostilities between Bhutan and the British Empire. The position adopted by Britain was to allow enslaved British subjects to return of their own free will, but refrain from repatriating escaped Bhutanese slaves back to Bhutan. (Cf. non-refoulement)

During the 19th century, the British government also grappled with slavery in neighboring Sikkim and Cooch Behar. By 1877, slaves from Bhutan were regarded by the British government as Bhutanese refugees. Meanwhile, the slave trade remained a lucrative source of profit to local Bhutanese officials near the Indian border.

In the early 20th century, Bhutan limited the slave trade as it developed laws reflecting the chattel nature of slaves. King Ugyen Wangchuck's 1916 reforms of the Tsa Yig legal code prohibited the sale and purchase of slaves, and limited the use of coolies by state officers to occasions where the health of the officer required such. Otherwise, the institution of slavery was left intact despite reform: slaves attempting to escape were to be detained, and anyone who harbored an escaped slave was to "make good the slave." However, if one returned an escaped slave, the owner faced a legal obligation to compensate him for his time and effort.

=== Slave demography ===
Slaves originated from multiple sources, both inside and outside Bhutan. Tribal areas of central, southern, and eastern Bhutan (e.g., Lhop, Lepcha, and Monpa) as well as prisons in Ngalop areas of western Bhutan were domestic sources of slaves. Outside Bhutan proper, various ethnic groups of the Assam Duars including the Mechi were subject to taxation and slaving such that entire villages were abandoned when the British government surveyed the region in 1865. Slaves acquired from Indian Assam, where slaves constituted 5–9% of the total population, were often born slaves or already enslaved as condemned criminals.

Culturally and linguistically part of the populations of West Bengal or Assam, these slaves were mostly caste Hindus and practiced wet-rice and dry-rice agriculture. Indian slaves were generally brought to Bhutan from tribal areas. Many slaves who arrived since the 1800s were the forefathers of modern Lhotshampa, a heterogeneous community of Nepalese origin in southern Bhutan.

As slaves of the state, many slave communities were concentrated in traditional population centres such as Thimphu and Punakha.

=== Treatment of slaves ===
The majority of slaves in Bhutan were bound to government service. Others cleared the humid malarial jungles of south Bhutan to develop the nation's agricultural lands. Foremost, slaves were the primary source of government labour in and around dzongs, which served as administrative centres. Although slaves had no personal or professional liberty, they filled military and administrative ranks within the government, including high posts, a silver lining of upward mobility. The Royal Government placed male youths in the service of the palace and in provincial administrative centers. This provided generations of technically competent, politically dependable cadres serving lifelong roles. Female slaves, however, were used mainly as sex slaves in brothels.

There was no substantial difference between the state and treatment of feudal serfs and chattel slaves in pre-modern Bhutan. Slaves and servile classes attached to land grants were regularly traded as a showing of goodwill among rulers of neighboring states.

== Abolition and legacy ==
As part of King Jigme Dorji Wangchuck's modernization efforts, land reform was accompanied by the abolition of slavery and serfdom. After abolition, many ex-slave communities were near traditional population centres because it was there that they had been pressed into service to the state. Many of these former slaves and their descendants have remained in urban centres, supporting and joining an emerging rentier class.

Rural slaves including many Lhotshampa, who had developed malarial jungles into productive agricultural lands, feared eviction and deportation. With the enactment of land reform and the Nationality Act of 1958, they were granted citizenship and began to prosper. In part because the manumission of slaves and serfs was accompanied by land redistribution awarding them outright ownership, slavery left no legacy in Bhutan comparable to that of African Americans in the United States and Brazil.

The Nationality Act of 1958 was repealed by the Citizenship Act of 1985. After this the first nationwide census was implemented from 1988. The largest group within the country affected by the enforcement of the Citizenship Act were the Lhotshampa people; this group, a generalized term for those of Nepalese descent, comprised 43% of the total population of Bhutan in 1988. Bhutanese security forces moved through the southern regions of the country, home to most of the Lhotshampa, forcing them from their homes and across the southern borders into Nepal. Because most of the people exiled did not speak Dzongkha, they were classified as illegal aliens, thus able to be removed from the country. In total, between 100,000 and 150,000, 1/6 of Bhutan's population in 1988, ended up in Nepalese refugee camps. By 2015 over 100,000 Bhutanese refugees in Nepal were settled in third nations.

== See also ==
- History of Bhutan
- Human rights in Bhutan
- Immigration in Bhutan
- Rentier capitalism
- Rentier state
- Slave trade
- Slavery in China
  - Serfdom in Tibet controversy
- Slavery in India
- Citizenship Act of 1985
