= Sharchop =

Sharchop may refer to:

- Sharchop people
- Sharchop language
