= Bhotiya =

Tibetic peoples of the Transhimalayan region

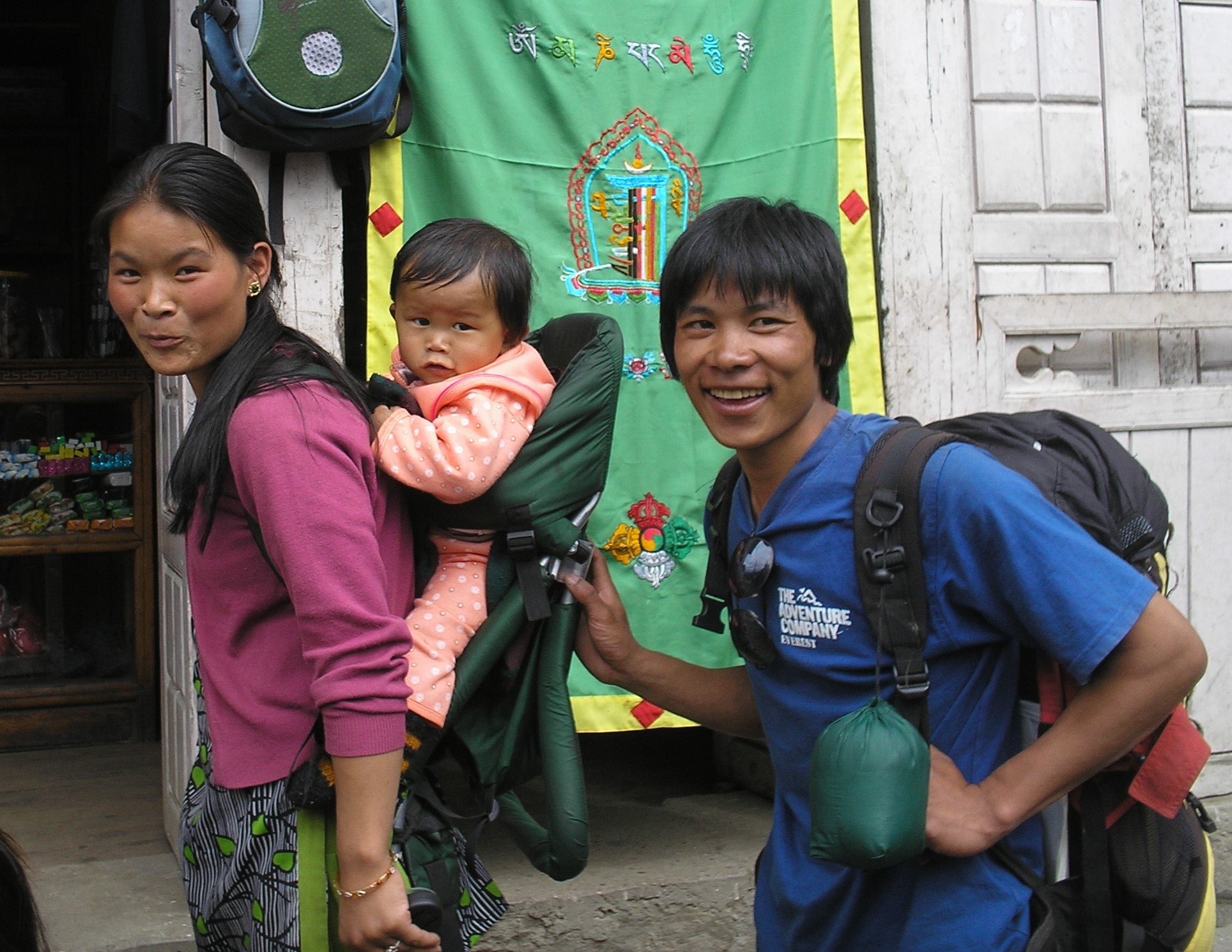
- A Bhotiya family

Total population
- 13,397 (2011)

Regions with significant populations
- Nepal and India
- Nepal: 13,397 (2011)

Languages
- Ladakhi, Sherpa, Standard Tibetan and other Tibetic languages, also Nepali and Hindi

Religion
- Buddhism; Hinduism; Christianity; Islam

Related ethnic groups
- Bhutia; Sherpa; Ladakhis; Tibetan; Uttarakhand Bhotiya; Ngalop; Tshangla

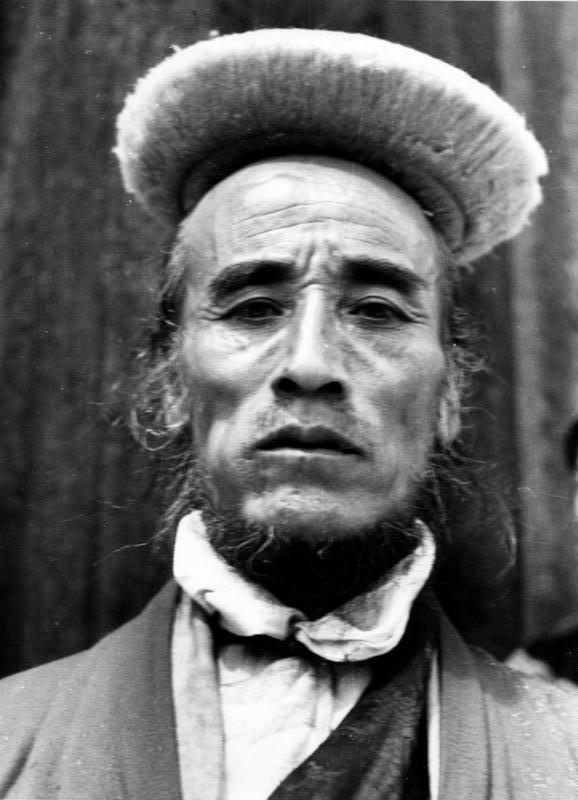
A senior official in Sikkim, ethnic Bhotiya, 1938

Bhotiya or Bhote (Nepali: भोटिया or भोटे) is an Indian and Nepalese exonym used to refer to various ethnic groups speaking Tibetic and Tibeto-Burman languages across the Transhimalayan borderlands dividing South Asia from Tibet. The word Bhotiya or Bhote comes from the classical Tibetan local name for Tibet, Bod (བོད). These communities speak numerous languages including Ladakhi, Drejongke, Yolmo, Sherpa, etc. In India, Bhotia is an official Scheduled Tribe, and communities are campaigning to add their shared language, Bhoti, included in the Constitution's Eighth Schedule. In Nepal, the label Bhote is often rejected due to historical social stigma; instead, the government recognizes these communities by their individual names, such as Sherpa, Yolmo, Lopa, Dolpo, etc as Janajati groups.

== Background ==
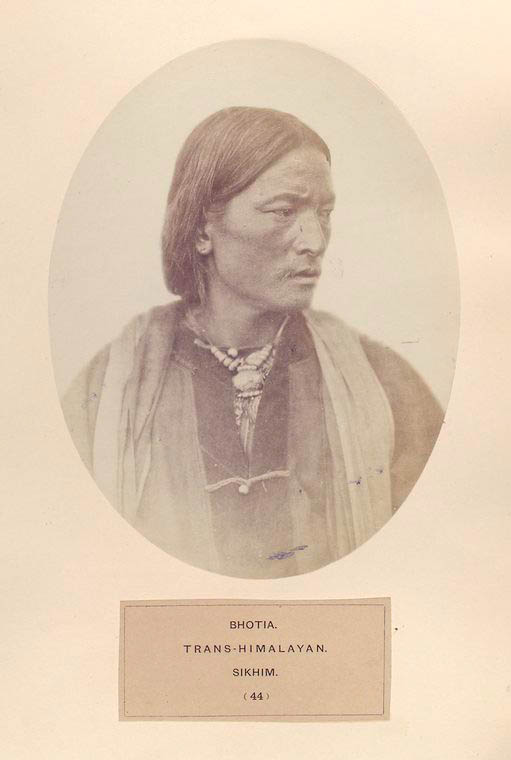
Bhotia, trans-Himalayan, Sikhim

The Bhotiyas of Himachal Pradesh and Uttarakhand identify as Raghuvanshi Rajput and prefer to be referred as Thakur or Rajvanshi. The Bhotiya may be the original immigrants to north Oudh in the period of Nawab Asaf-Ud-Dowlah (1775 to 1797).

The Bhotiya people are closely related to several other groups and ethnic boundaries are porous. One group is the Bhutia, the main ethnolinguistic group of the northern part of the Indian state of Sikkim. A second is the Uttarakhand Bhotiya of the upper Himalayan valleys of the Kumaon and the Garhwal divisions of Uttarakhand. These include the Shauka tribe of Kumaon, the Tolchhas and the Marchhas of Garhwal, Gyagar Khampa of Khimling, Bhidang. A third related group are the Dzongkha speaking Ngalop people, the main ethnolinguistic group of Bhutan. The Bhotiya are also related to several dispersed groups in Nepal and the adjacent areas of India including the Tibetans and Sherpas.

In Nepal, Bhotiya is 0.1 percent of the population. They live in villages throughout the Himalayas.

== Language ==
The language of the Bhotiya people is called "Bhoti" or "Bhotia", but is in fact a cover term for a wide variety of Tibeto-Burman languages spoken in India. It is usually written in the Tibetan script. Bhoti and Bhotia is spoken in Himachal Pradesh, Sikkim, Uttarakhand, Arunachal Pradesh, Bhutan, Nepal, Tibet, and parts of Pakistan and West Bengal. Bhoti is not included in the languages with official status in India.

== Population ==
The Bhotiya, tribe people are native (indigenous) people belonging to Himalayan Belt. In Nepal they live in the northern and eastern regions of Nepal, where they and other Tibetans are the region's autochthonous (indigenous) people. By the 2001 census of Nepal, they number 27,230. (Note: Includes Bhote (19,261) and Bote (7,969).)

The Bhotiya also live in the Indian states of Jammu and Kashmir, Himachal Pradesh, Uttarakhand, Uttar Pradesh, West Bengal, Sikkim, Assam, Arunachal Pradesh and Tripura. In Uttar Pradesh, the Bhotiya live in the Bahraich, Gonda, Lakhimpur, Lucknow, Barabanki, Kanpur Nagar, Kanpur Dehat, and Kheri districts.

Bhotiya have six recognizable sub-groups: the Bhot, Bhotiya, the Bhutia of Sikkim, the Tibbati (of Sikkim and Arunachal Pradesh), the Bhut, the Gyakar Khampa of Khimling, Bhidang of Uttarakhand.

In the Indian states of Jammu and Kashmir, Himachal Pradesh, Uttarakhand, Uttar Pradesh, West Bengal, Sikkim, and Arunachal Pradesh, the Bhotiya people have Scheduled Tribe status.

In Uttarakhand, the Bhotiya are a Scheduled Tribe under the "Schedule caste order 1950, the constitutional Scheduled tribe (Uttar Pradesh) 1967 SC/ST." The Constitution of India recognizes the Bhotiya.

== Traditions ==
=== Weddings ===
Bhotiya marriages are similar to Hindu weddings. When the bride's palanquin arrives at her husband's house, gods are worshipped and then she is admitted to the house. Rice, silver or gold is put in the hands of the bridegroom, which he passes on to the bride. She places them in a winnowing fan, and hands them as a present to the wife of the barber. This ceremony is known as Karj Bharna. A man may have not more than three wives. The first wife is the head wife, and she inherits an additional one tenth of the husband's estate.

=== Funerals ===
The Bhotiyas have distinctive funerary traditions. Young children who die of cholera or snakebite are buried while others are cremated. There is no fixed burial ground, and no ceremonies are performed at the time of burial. The wealthy keep the ashes for lowal to several streams, while others bury them. After cremation, a stalk of kusha (grass) is fixed in the ground near a tank of water and sesamum is poured on it for ten days. This makes it a refuge for the deceased's spirit until the rites are completed.

== Economy ==
In Uttarakhand, particularly Chamoli, Pithoragarh and Uttarkashi, the Bhotiya are semi-nomadic, migratory pastoralists, moving about the border lands between India and Tibet.

They are also traders in the Himalayas for products such as cereal, wool, and salt. Now, some are farmers and others are merchants of stones, gems, and herbs.

The Bhotiya are experienced in the use of medicinal plants. The local fermented beverages are jan (a local beer), and daru. A local fermented food stuff is sez. The traditional catalyzing agent used in the preparation of fermented foods and beverages is called balam in the Kumaon Division and balma in Garhwal Division.

A cottage wool industry employs many Bhotiya. Women weave pattu, a coarse woolen serge. Plants are collected to make natural dyes for coloring the wool.

== In Nepal ==
The Central Bureau of Statistics of Nepal classifies the Bhotiya (called Bhote in the Nepal census) as a subgroup within the broader social group of Mountain/Hill Janajati. At the time of the 2011 Nepal census, 13,397 people (0.1% of the population of Nepal) were Bhotiya. The frequency of Bhotiya people by province was as follows:

- Karnali Province (0.1%)
- Koshi Province (0.1%)
- Sudurpashchim Province (0.1%)
- Bagmati Province (0.0%)
- Gandaki Province (0.0%)
- Lumbini Province (0.0%)
- Madhesh Province (0.0%)

The frequency of Bhotiya people was higher than national average (0.1%) in the following districts:

- Manang (6.9%)
- Sankhuwasabha (2.2%)
- Bajura (1.0%)
- Dolpa (0.7%)
- Mugu (0.6%)
- Taplejung (0.4%)
