= Mönpa =

Mönpa or Monpa may refer to:

- The Monpa people, an ethnic group in Bhutan, China and India.
- the ambiguous name for the diverse so-called Monpa languages spoken by the Monpa people, among which:
  - ʼOle, or Black Mountain Monpa, a highly endangered language of Bhutan
  - Kalaktang Monpa
  - Tawang Monpa
