= Khengkher District, Bhutan =

Khengkher is one of the most remote villages under the Mongar District, Bhutan. It consists of 27 villages and 424 households. Until 2011 it was three days' walk from three days' hike from Mongar town.

== Languages and origin ==
The common language spoken in Khengkhar is Tshangla which is spoken throughout eastern Bhutan. Tshangla is believed to be part of the Tibeto-Burman language family.

== Livelihood ==
Khengkher as a community has relatively few landholdings, which has implication for both subsistence and commercial agriculture. The water shortage in the area makes it difficult for farmers there to grow crops even at subsistence level. However, maize, wheat, beans and millet are grown for home consumption. The communities in these area make high-quality altar pieces and wooden masks. Women from Khengkher are known for weaving.

== Food ==
Maize is the stable food. Its often prepared and eaten with rice, ground into flour for dough and sometimes boiled and eaten. Pumpkin, radish and chili are common vegetables grown and eaten in the community.

== Life-cycle celebration ==
People of Khengkher celebrate the Chunyipa losar, or new year, on the first day of the 12th Bhutanese month with local sports, games, feasting and dance. It's a time where whole family gets together. Birth is likewise joyous occasion. Three days after a child is born, an astrologer is consulted to prepare keytsea birth chart indicating the child's astrologically determined tendencies during his or her life. Upon death village astrologer fixes the day for crimination.

== Development and social change ==
The block has two schools, khengkher lower secondary school and Udric community school. It also has one basic health unit. Recently the gewog blockhas constructed farm road.
