= Lhokpu language =

Sino-Tibetan language of southwestern Bhutan

Lhokpu
- Lhobikha, Taba-Damtoe-Bikha
- Native to: Bhutan
- Region: southwest Bhutan (Samtse, Chukha)
- Ethnicity: Lhop people
- Native speakers: (2,500 cited 1993)
- Language family: Sino-Tibetan: Tibeto-Burman; Lhokpu

Language codes
- ISO 639-3: lhp
- Glottolog: lhok1238
- ELP: Lhokpu
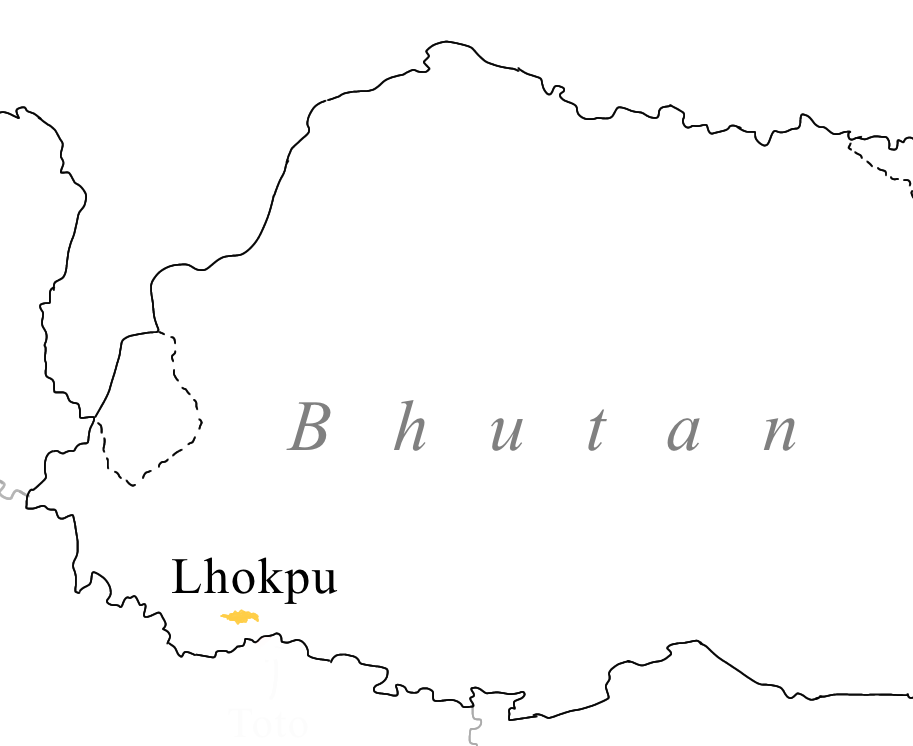
- Map of the Lhokpu language

- Lhokpu is classified as Definitely Endangered by the UNESCO Atlas of the World's Languages in Danger.

Lhokpu, also Lhobikha or Taba-Damtoe-Bikha, is a Sino-Tibetan language spoken by the Lhop people. It is spoken in southwestern Bhutan along the border of Samtse and Chukha Districts. Van Driem (2003) leaves it unclassified as a separate branch within the Sino-Tibetan language family.

== Phonology ==
=== Vowels ===
	Front	Back
Close	i	u
Mid	e	o
Open	a	ɒ

=== Consonants ===
		Bilabial		Alveolar		Palatal	Velar	Glottal
		plain	aspirated	plain	aspirated	Palatal	Velar	Glottal
Stop	voiceless	p	pʰ	t	tʰ	c	k	
Stop	voiced	b	bʱ	d	dʱ	ɟ	ɡ	
Fricative				s				h
Nasal		m		n			ŋ	
Approximant				l		j	w	
Trill				r				

== Classification ==
Lhokpu is a Sino-Tibetan languages spoken by the Lhop people in Bhutan.

Grollmann & Gerber (2017) consider Lhokpu to have a particularly close relationship with Dhimal and Toto.

== Name ==
Lhokpu is spoken by the Lhop—a Dzongkha term meaning "Southerners"—, who "represent the aboriginal [gdung] Dung population of western Bhutan.

== Geographic distribution ==
According to the Ethnologue, Lhokpu is spoken in Damtey, Loto Kuchu, Lotu, Sanglong, Sataka, and Taba villages, located between Samtsi and Phuntsoling, in Samtse District, Bhutan.

== Culture ==
The Lhop people are animists rather than Buddhists, burying their dead rather than cremating them as Buddhists do. Their society is matrilineal and matrilocal.

== See also ==
- Languages of Bhutan
- Dhimalish comparative vocabulary list (Wiktionary)
