= Bhutanese Citizenship Act =

The Bhutanese Citizenship Act may refer to:

- The Bhutanese Citizenship Act 1958
- The Bhutanese Citizenship Act 1985
