= Illegal immigration to Bhutan =

On January 6, 1989, the Bhutanese king proclaimed a policy of “One Nation, One People.” This royal edict, called the Driglam namzha, states that all Bhutanese have to dress and speak like Drukpas. Bhutanese citizens of Nepali descent were deemed illegal immigrants.

The Bhutanese government have been criticised for its human rights record in its treatment of Immigrants. The Bhutan government claim they are merely trying to streamline their immigration policy.

According to Bhutanese National Council members, illegal immigration to Bhutan is on the rise due to hydropower projects.

== See also ==
- Immigration to Bhutan
