= Lhop people =

Lhop (Doya) (ལྷོབ༌ ཡང་ན་ དྲོ་ཡ)
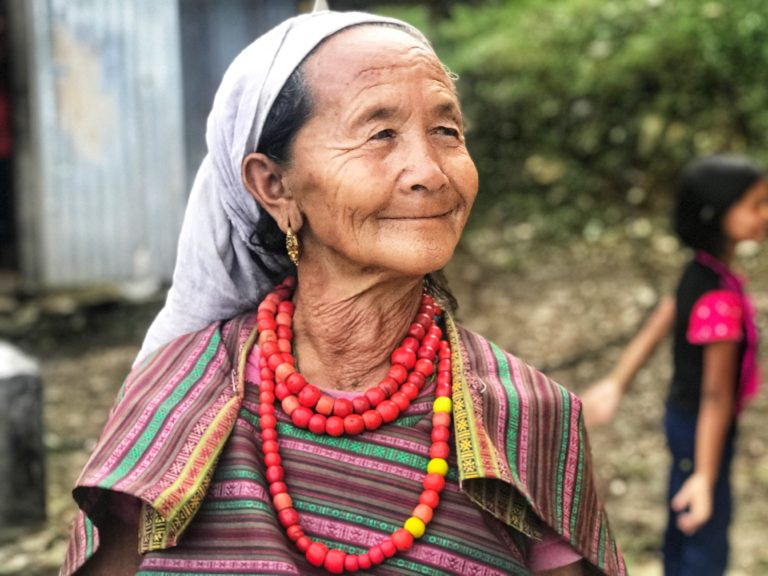
- Lhop elderly women

Total population
- 2,500 (1993)

Regions with significant populations
- Southwestern Bhutan (Samtse District)

Languages
- Lhokpu, Dzongkha

Religion
- Buddhism

Related ethnic groups
- Lepcha • hazaras

The Lhop or Doya people (Dzongkha: ལྷོབ་ ་ཡང་ན་ དྲོ་ཡ) are a little-known tribe of southwest Bhutan. The Lhop are found in the low valleys of Dorokha Gewog and near Phuntsholing in the Duars. The dress of the Lhop resembles the Lepcha, but they bear little similarity with the Bhutia in the North and the Toto in the west. The Doya trace their descent matrilineally, marry their cross cousins, and embalm the deceased who are then placed in a foetal position in a circular sarcophagus above the ground. They follow a blend of Tibetan Buddhism mixed with animism.

== See also ==
- Ethnic groups in Bhutan
- Sharchop
