= Toto language =

Sino-Tibetan language

Toto
- 𞊒𞊪𞊒𞊪, টোটো
- The word "Toto" in Toto and Bengali script
- Region: West Bengal
- Ethnicity: Toto
- Native speakers: 1,411 (2014)
- Language family: Sino-Tibetan: Tibeto-Burman; Kiranti (?); Dhimalish; Toto
- Writing system: Bengali script and Toto script

Language codes
- ISO 639-3: txo
- Glottolog: toto1302
- ELP: Toto
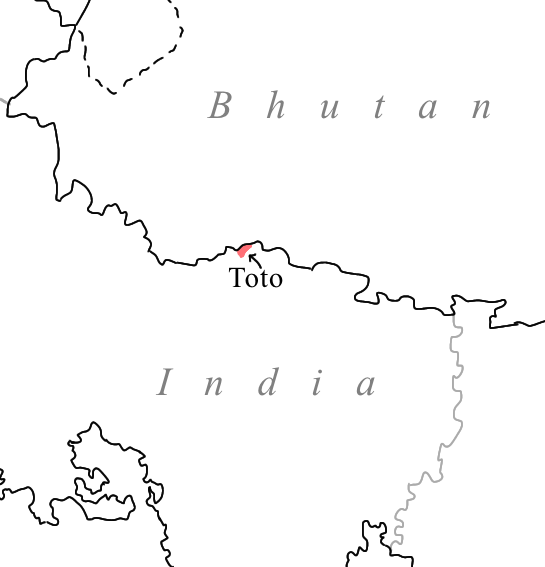
- Map of the Toto language

- Toto is classified as Critically Endangered language by the UNESCO Atlas of the World's Languages in Danger

Toto (Bengali: টোটো, Toto: 𞊒𞊪𞊒𞊪) is a Sino-Tibetan language spoken on the border of India and Bhutan by the Toto people. The Toto are an Indigenous community originating from Totopara, West Bengal along the border with Bhutan. It is also spoken in Subhapara, Dhunchipara, and Panchayatpara hillocks in Jalpaiguri district, West Bengal.

== Status ==
Toto is listed as a critically endangered language by UNESCO, with perhaps 1,000 speakers residing in Totopara in West Bengal bordering Bhutan. Most families in the community speak Toto at home. Most children learn Toto at home while using Bengali in school.

Anthropological Survey of India (AnSI) set out to conduct a study on language of the Toto tribe, whose population has dwindled to 1,536, they did not realize that the language is more endangered than the tribe itself. Researchers as well the members of the Toto community admit that the language is under threat and the influence of other languages, particularly Nepali and Bengali, is increasing day by day.

In 2023, Bhakta Toto compiled Toto Shabda Sangraha, a trilingual dictionary published by the Calcutta Comparatists 1919 that records Toto words in the Bengali script with meanings in both Bengali and English. Toto has survived through oral tradition. Although a script was devised in 2015 by community leader Dhaniram Toto, most speakers continue to use the Bengali script, or write directly in Bengali.

The Himalayan Languages Project is working on the first grammatical sketch of Toto. Adamas University is developing an AI-driven Toto–Bangla–English trilingual language learning application to support digital archiving and promote revitalization through accessible, technology-based tools.

== Phonology ==
Toto consists of 25 segmental phonemes, of which 19 are consonants and six are vowels. The phonemes of this language are as follows:

=== Vowels ===
There are six vowel phonemes in the Toto language: /i/, /e/, /ə/, /a/, /o/, /u/. They can be classified:

- horizontally into three groups as front unrounded, central unrounded and back rounded vowels;
- vertically into four groups as close, close-mid, open-mid and open.

There are eight diphthongs realized in Toto, these are:

- /eu/ — occurring in initial and medial positions,
- /au/, /ou/ — occurring only in the medial position,
- /ei/, /əi/, /ai/, /oi/ — occurring in medial and final positions, and
- /ui/ — occurring in all positions.

The following minimal pairs establish the phonetics status of the vowel:

/i/~/e/
/iŋ/ 'brother in-law', vs. /eŋ/ 'ginger'
/ciwa/ 'tear', vs. /cewa/ 'cut' (cloth)
/i/~/a/
/guJi/ 'owl', vs. /guJa/ 'pocket'
/nico/ 'fire', vs. /naco/ 'two'
/i/~/u/
/Jiya/ 'rat', vs. /Juya/ 'bird'
/ei/~/əi/
/e/~/a/
/lepa/ 'brain', vs. /lapa/ 'jungle betel leaf'
/kewa/ 'birth', vs. /kawa/ 'sound'
/e/~/o/
/je/ 'grass', vs. /jo/ 'breast'

=== Consonants ===
With regards to consonants, Toto has an inventory of seven sonorants (nasals and liquids) and twelve obstruents (stops and fricative), eight of which are contrastive in voicing. It also distinguishes the voiceless obstruents /t/ and /p/ with their aspirated equivalents /tʰ/ and /pʰ/, respectively.

		Bilabial		Alveolar		Palatal	Velar	Glottal
		plain	aspirated	plain	aspirated	Palatal	Velar	Glottal
Stop	voiceless	p	pʰ	t	tʰ	c	k	
Stop	voiced	b		d		ɟ	ɡ	
Fricative				s				h
Nasal		m		n			ŋ	
Approximant				l		j	w	
Trill				r				

== Vocabulary ==
Below are some Toto words from van Driem (1995), who uses these words to suggest that Toto may be a Sal language.

- aŋ- 'to drink'
- bɔcɔŋ 'shoulder'
- yoti 'cooking pot' (second syllable), cf. Dzongkha dî 'jug'
- uŋtí 'seed'
- haní 'today'
- tarí 'moon'
- lip- 'fall' (cf. Benedict's PTB *lip 'dive, sink, drown')
- tɛ́bo 'big' (first syllable)
- así 'shit'
- daŋkre 'right' (vs. 'left')
- buibé 'stomach' (first syllable); the second syllable -be is cognate with Toto biyá 'meat'
- biyá 'meat'
- wɔteŋ 'bamboo species' (first syllable), Nepali ḍhuṅgre ko ghās
- maʔoŋ 'paddy'
- bagreŋ 'wing'
- saní 'sun'
- jâr- 'stand'
- anji 'yesterday'
- böidi 'navel'
- lâru- 'bring'
- em- 'to shit'
- jiŋ- 'sleep'
- cici 'urine'
- kiya 'dog'
- miŋ 'name'
- daŋ 'horn'
- maibe 'flower'
- pǘyɔ 'snake'
- luŋtü 'stone'
- lɛbɛ́ 'tongue'
- maŋbü- 'to dream'
- nanuŋ 'ear'
- mico 'eye'
- ŋaya 'fish'
- musa 'body hair'
- ka 'I'
- taŋpa 'sole of the foot'
- paká 'pig'
- nati 'thou'
- satáŋ 'tooth'
- si- 'die'
- ca- 'eat'
- the- 'be sweet, taste sweet'
- toise 'mango' (suffix: -se)
- daŋse 'jackfruit' (suffix: -se)
- sâ- 'kill'
- dai- 'dig'
- köitü 'egg'
- yuŋ- 'sit, stay'
- ti 'water'
- mití 'tear'
- totí 'spit'
- wɛtí 'rain'
- yutí 'blood'
- yutí 'milk'
- dikɔ́ 'buffalo'
- ü- 'come down, descend'
- ŋɛtɔ́ŋ 'neck'
- to pa- 'weave'
- kai- 'cry'
- ŋɔká 'monkey'
- jüwɔ́ 'mouse, rat'

=== Pronouns ===
The Toto personal pronouns are (van Driem 1995):

	singular	plural
first person	ka	kibi
second person	nati	natibi
third person	aku	abi

=== Numerals ===
The Toto numerals are (van Driem 1995):

English numeral	bare stem for counting	counting humans	counting animals	inanimate objects
one	i	iccɔ	ippu	icce
two	ni	niso	nipu	nise
three	suŋ	sumcɔ	suŋpu	suŋse
four	di	dicɔ	dipu	dise
five	ŋa	ŋacɔ	ŋapu	ŋase
six	tu	tukcɔ	tukpu	tuse
seven	ni	nícɔ	nípu	níse
eight	yâ	yấcɔ	yấpu	yấse
nine	ku	kucɔ	kupu	kuse
ten	tâ	tâcɔ	tâpu	tâse
eleven	eghâra	eghârcɔ	eghârpu	eghârse
twelve	bâra	bârcɔ	bârpu	bârse
twenty	ikai	ikai cɔ	ikai pu	ikai se
twenty-one	ikai-so i	ikai-so iccɔ	ikai-so ippu	ikai-so icce
thirty	ikai-so tâ	ikai-so tâcɔ	ikai-so tâpu	ikai-so tâse
forty	nikai	nikai cɔ	nikai pu	nikai se
fifty	nikai-so tâ	nikai-so tâcɔ	nikai-so tâpu	nikai-so tâse
sixty	suŋkai	suŋkai cɔ	suŋkai pu	suŋkai se

== Writing system ==
Toto script 𞊒𞊪𞊒𞊪 𞊫𞊠𞊐𞊭𞊑𞊦𞊒
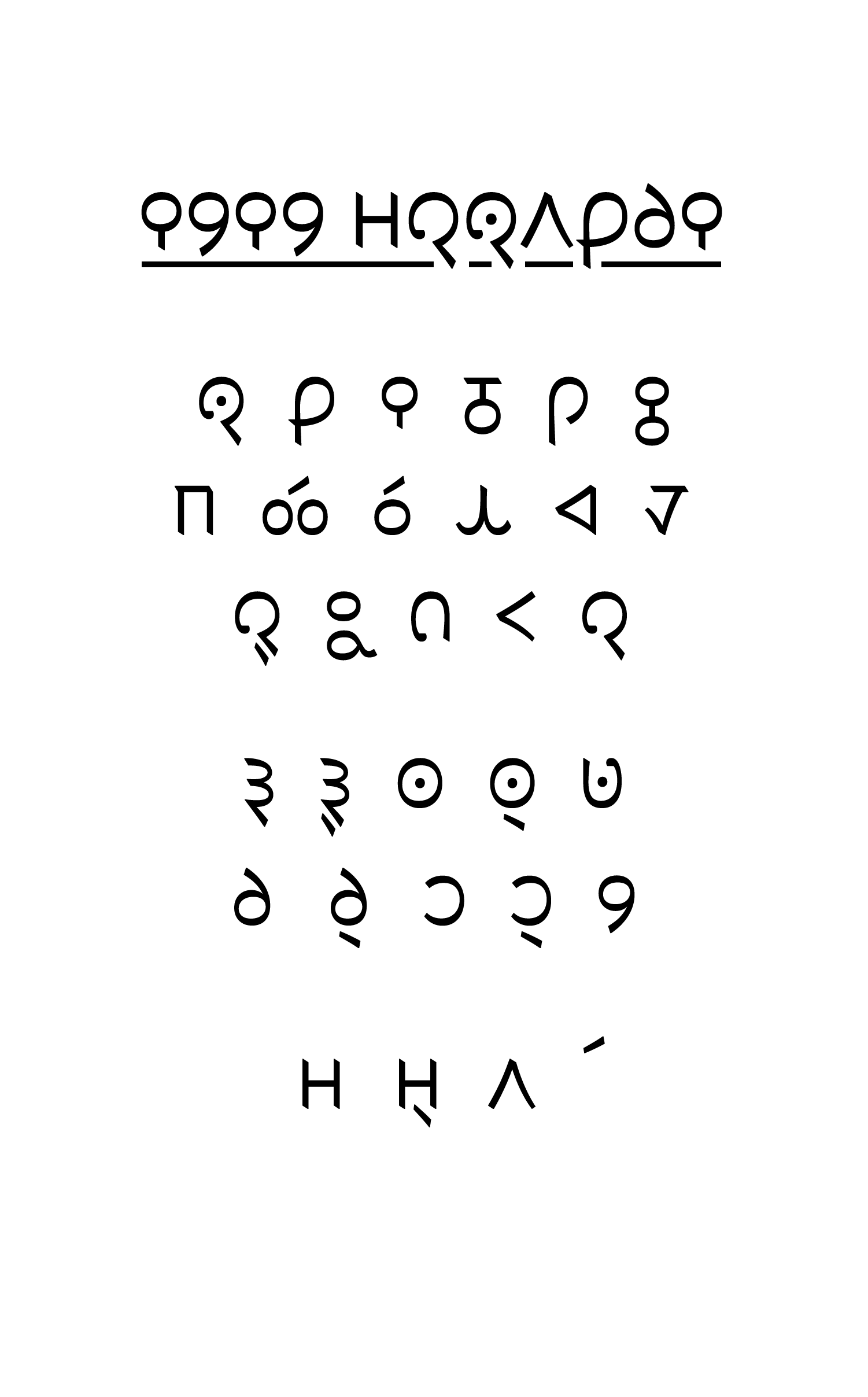
- Toto Alphabet Chart
- Script type: Alphabet
- Creator: Dhaniram Toto
- Published: 2015
- Period: 2015 - present
- Region: Bengal
- Languages: Toto

Related scripts
- Parent systems: Original invention: Toto script

ISO 15924
- ISO 15924: Toto (294), Toto

Unicode
- Unicode alias: Toto
- Unicode range: U+1E290–U+1E2BF

An alphabetic script developed for the language by community elder and author, Dhaniram Toto, was published in 2015, and has seen limited but increasing use in literature, education, and computing; most significantly, the Toto alphabet was added to the Unicode Standard in September, 2021. Prior to the publication of this script, Dhaniram Toto and other members of the community (whose literacy rate as per sample survey carried out in 2003 was just 33.64 per cent) penned books and poems in the Bengali script.

=== Unicode ===
The Toto alphabet was added to the Unicode Standard in September, 2021 with the release of version 14.0.

The Unicode block for Toto is U+1E290–U+1E2BF:

Toto^{[1]}^{[2]} Official Unicode Consortium code chart (PDF)
	0	1	2	3	4	5	6	7	8	9	A	B	C	D	E	F
U+1E29x	𞊐	𞊑	𞊒	𞊓	𞊔	𞊕	𞊖	𞊗	𞊘	𞊙	𞊚	𞊛	𞊜	𞊝	𞊞	𞊟
U+1E2Ax	𞊠	𞊡	𞊢	𞊣	𞊤	𞊥	𞊦	𞊧	𞊨	𞊩	𞊪	𞊫	𞊬	𞊭	𞊮	
U+1E2Bx																
Notes 1.As of Unicode version 18.0 2.Grey areas indicate non-assigned code points

== See also ==
- Dhimalish comparative vocabulary list (Wiktionary)
