= Demographics of Bhutan =

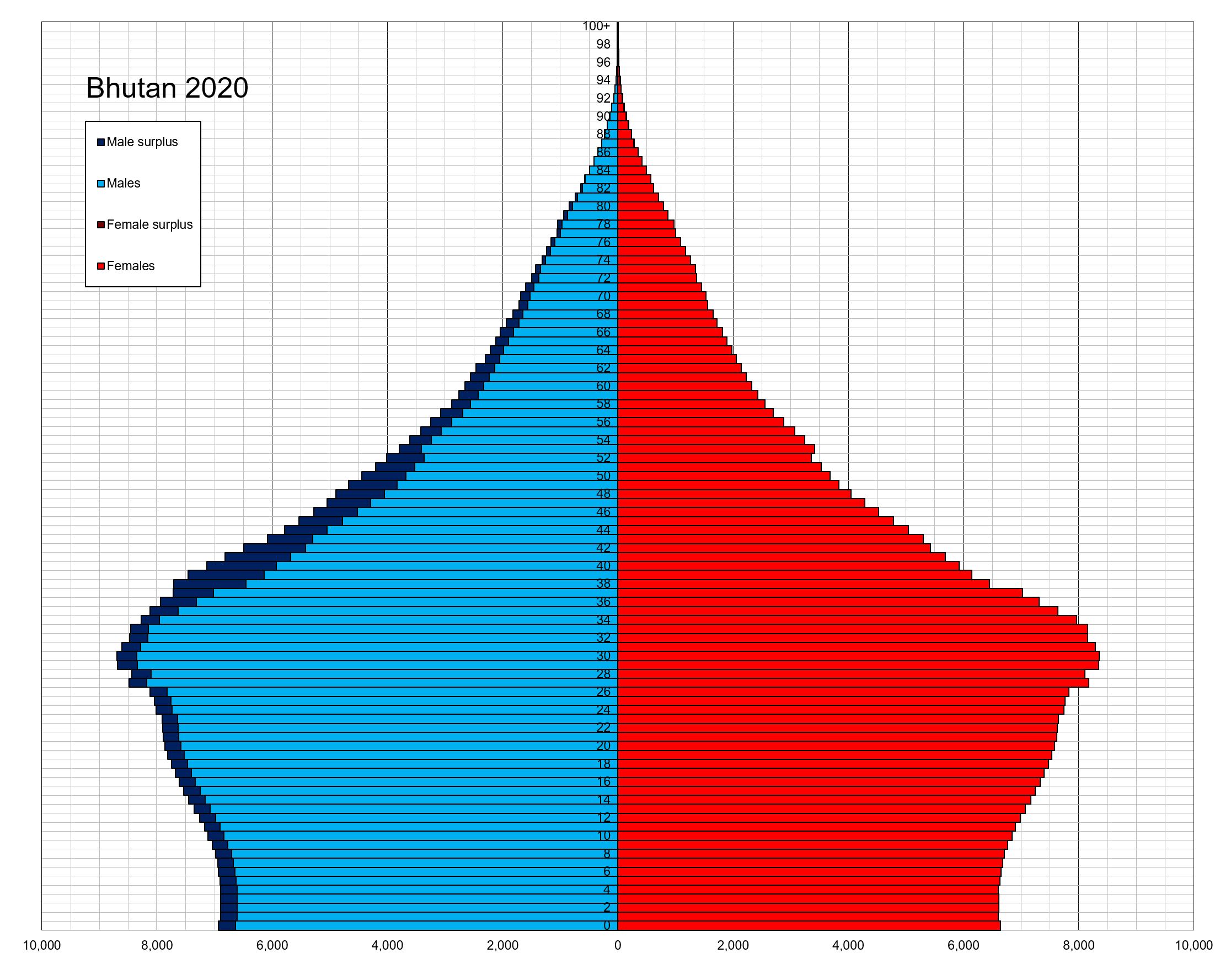
- Population pyramid of Bhutan in 2020
- Population: 786,387 (2023)
- Birth rate: 12.66 births/1,000 population (2023)
- Death rate: 6.11 deaths/1,000 population (2023)
- Life expectancy: ▲74.9 years (2021)
  - male: ▲73.9 years (2021)
  - female: 75.9 years (2021)
- Fertility rate: ▼1.44 children born/woman (2025)
- Infant mortality: 19.3 deaths/1,000 live births (2023)
- Immigrant share: 14.2% (2024)

Nationality
- Major ethnic: Tibeto-Burman (96.60%); Dzongkha-speaking Ngalop (Bhutia) (35.67%); Sharchops (30.41%); ▼ Lhotshampa (Nepali) (24.32%); Other Tibeto-Burmans (e.g., Brokpa, Layap) (6.20%)
- Minor ethnic: Indo-Aryan (2.64%); Nepali speakers (non-Lhotshampa) (1.88%); Other Indo-Aryans (e.g; Assamese) (0.76%); Others (0.76%); Dravidian (e.g., Tamil) (0.30%); Other Ethnicities (e.g., foreigners, minor groups) (0.46%)

This is a demography of the population of Bhutan including population density, ethnicity, education level, health of the populace, economic status, religious affiliations and other aspects of the population.

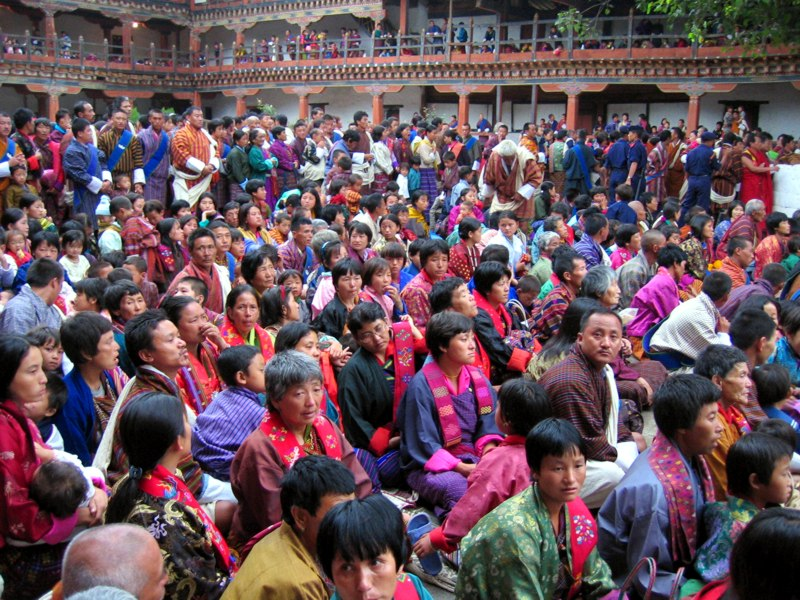
Bhutanese people in national dress at the Wangdi Phodrang festival

The Royal Government of Bhutan listed the country's population as 752,700 in 2003.

The Bhutanese numbers can be reconstructed from their 9th Five Year Plan documents, which lists the exact number of households in each gewog. If the Bhutanese refugee advocate groups are correct, a spot check of a southern gewog should show a massive under-reporting of population.

The CIA World Fact book number has since been adjusted with a note of former inconsistencies, and attributes the difference to the government not including the "first modern census of Bhutan, conducted in 2005". In the 1970s Bhutan was one of the most isolated countries in the world and nobody knew how many people lived there since no census had ever been taken.

== Demographic statistics ==
The following demographic statistics are from the CIA World Factbook, unless otherwise indicated.

== Population ==
708,427 (July 2011 est.)
716,896 (July 2012 est.)
750,125 (July 2016 est.)

=== Population by Sex and Age Group ===
Population Estimates by Sex and Age Group (01.VII.2013) (Data refer to projected figures based on the Population and Housing Census 2005 (district projection)):

Age group	Male	Female	Total	%
Total	381 582	351 421	733 004	100
0-4	42 725	41 999	84 724	11,56
5-9	38 396	37 725	76 121	10,38
10-14	32 169	31 593	63 762	8,70
15-19	35 432	34 403	69 835	9,53
20-24	36 526	34 745	71 271	9,72
25-29	35 433	32 065	67 498	9,21
30-34	33 279	28 491	61 770	8,43
35-39	28 766	24 060	52 827	7,21
40-44	23 774	19 545	43 319	5,91
45-49	19 391	16 213	35 604	4,86
50-54	15 245	13 209	28 455	3,88
55-59	12 257	10 806	23 063	3,15
60-64	9 602	8 645	18 247	2,49
65-69	7 268	6 741	14 009	1,91
70-74	5 169	4 956	10 124	1,38
75-79	3 338	3 313	6 651	0,91
80+	2 812	2 912	5 724	0,78
Age group	Male	Female	Total	Percent
0-14	113 290	111 317	224 607	30,64
15-64	249 705	222 182	471 887	64,38
65+	18 587	17 922	36 509	4,98

Population by Sex and Age Group (Census 30.V.2017) (Excluding 8408 non-Bhutanese/tourists found in hotels on the census reference day.):

Age group	Male	Female	Total	%
Total	380 453	346 692	727 145	100
0–4	29 176	28 298	57 474	7.90
5–9	32 035	30 956	62 991	8.66
10–14	34 656	34 296	68 952	9.48
15–19	34 679	33 607	68 286	9.39
20–24	41 075	34 340	75 415	10.37
25–29	42 802	36 478	79 280	10.90
30–34	35 059	30 121	65 180	8.96
35–39	29 689	25 860	55 549	7.64
40–44	22 274	19 221	41 495	5.71
45–49	18 865	16 668	35 533	4.89
50–54	15 456	13 861	29 317	4.03
55–59	12 379	11 519	23 898	3.29
60–64	10 498	10 213	20 711	2.85
65-69	7 585	7 069	14 654	2.02
70-74	5 876	5 592	11 468	1.58
75-79	3 965	3 906	7 871	1.08
80-84	2 651	2 746	5 397	0.74
85-89	1 262	1 338	2 600	0.36
90-94	338	439	777	0.11
95-99	120	143	263	0.04
100+	13	21	34	<0.01
Age group	Male	Female	Total	Percent
0–14	95 867	93 550	189 417	26.05
15–64	262 776	231 888	494 664	68.03
65+	21 810	21 254	43 064	5.92

Population Estimates by Sex and Age Group (30.VII.2020) (Estimates or projections based on the 2017 Population Census.):

Age group	Male	Female	Total	%
Total	390 877	358 054	748 931	100
0–4	29 208	28 557	57 765	7.71
5–9	30 495	29 235	59 730	7.98
10–14	33 159	32 388	65 547	8.75
15–19	34 343	34 200	68 543	9.15
20–24	36 655	33 428	70 083	9.36
25–29	42 547	35 456	78 003	10.42
30–34	39 913	34 311	74 224	9.91
35–39	32 294	28 047	60 341	8.06
40–44	26 259	22 904	49 163	6.56
45–49	20 171	17 597	37 768	5.04
50–54	17 115	15 289	32 404	4.33
55–59	13 709	12 419	26 128	3.49
60–64	11 132	10 667	21 799	2.91
65-69	8 849	8 583	17 432	2.33
70-74	6 171	5 792	11 963	1.60
75-79	4 399	4 346	8 745	1.17
80-84	2 587	2 734	5 321	0.71
85+	1 871	2 101	3 972	0.53
Age group	Male	Female	Total	Percent
0–14	92 862	90 180	183 042	24.44
15–64	274 138	244 318	518 456	69.23
65+	23 877	23 556	47 433	6.33

Median age

Total: 27.2 years
Male: 27.7 years
Female: 26.6 years (2016 est.)

Urbanization

urban population: 38.6% of total population (2015)
rate of urbanization: 3.69% annual rate of change (2010-15 est.)

== Vital statistics ==
=== UN estimates ===
Below is a table of Bhutan vital statistics since 1950 published by the United Nations Department of Economic and Social Affairs.

Period	Live births per year	Deaths per year	Natural change per year	CBR^{1}	CDR^{1}	NC^{1}	TFR^{1}	IMR^{1}
1950–1955	9,000	5,000	4,000	47.9	27.1	20.8	6.67	184.8
1955–1960	10,000	6,000	5,000	49.0	26.8	22.3	6.67	181.4
1960–1965	12,000	6,000	6,000	48.5	25.7	22.8	6.67	174.1
1965–1970	13,000	7,000	7,000	47.8	24.1	23.8	6.67	163.1
1970–1975	16,000	7,000	8,000	47.0	22.0	25.1	6.67	149.3
1975–1980	18,000	8,000	10,000	45.8	19.6	26.2	6.67	133.2
1980–1985	20,000	8,000	12,000	42.7	17.1	25.6	6.39	117.1
1985–1990	21,000	8,000	13,000	40.4	15.0	25.3	6.11	104.0
1990–1995	19,000	7,000	12,000	35.2	12.5	22.7	5.27	87.5
1995–2000	16,000	5,000	11,000	29.2	9.9	19.3	4.13	69.7
2000–2005	15,000	5,000	11,000	25.2	7.9	17.2	3.30	52.8
2005–2010	15,000	5,000	10,000	21.5	7.2	14.4	2.61	44.4
^{1} CBR = crude birth rate (per 1000); CDR = crude death rate (per 1000); NC = natural change (per 1000); TFR = total fertility rate (number of children per woman); IMR = infant mortality rate per 1000 births

=== Registered births and deaths ===
	Population	Live births	Deaths	Natural change	Crude birth rate (per 1000)	Crude death rate (per 1000)	Natural change (per 1000)	Crude migration rate (per 1000)	Total fertility rate
2005	635,000	12,538	4,498	8,040	19.7	7.1	12.6		2.4
2006									
2007									
2008									
2009									
2010									
2011									
2012									
2013									
2014									
2015									
2016	726,596	9,718	3,541	6,177	13.4	4.9	8.5		1.7
2017	727,145	9,841	3,367	6,474	13.5	4.6	8.9	−8.15	1.7
2018	734,374	10,711	3,364	7,347	14.6	4.6	10.0	−0.16	1.83 (e)
2019	741,672	9,667	3,220	6,447	13.0	4.3	8.7	1.15	1.63 (e)
2020	748,931	9,769	3,109	6,660	13.0	4.2	8.8	0.80	1.62 (e)
2021	756,129	10,248	3,192	7,638	13.6	4.2	9.4	−0.58	1.69 (e)
2022	763,249	9,711	3,605	6,106	13.3	4.7	8.6	1.33	1.58 (e)
2023	770,276	8,988	3,579	5,409	11.7	4.6	7.1	2.10	1.45 (e)

Life expectancy in Bhutan

=== Life expectancy at birth ===
Total population: 70.2 years
Male: 68.8 years
Female: 71.7 years (2017 est.)

Life expectancy at birth is 70.2 years, which is an increase from 66.3 years in 2005. Women (71.7 years) live longer than men (68.8).

In 2018, Prime Minister Tshering Tobgay announced that the average life expectancy at birth has surpassed 70.

== Ethnic groups ==
1. Ngalop people and Sharchop people (63.0%)
2. Lhotsampas (also known as Nepalis) (22.0%)
3. Indigenous or migrant ethnic groups (15.0%)

== Religions ==
Religion in Bhutan, 2010
1. Buddhism (74.7%)
2. Hinduism (22.6%)
3. Bon (folk religion) (1.90%)
4. Christianity (0.50%)
5. Islam (0.20%)
6. Others (0.10%)

Bhutan is a Buddhist country by constitution and Buddhism plays a vital role in the country.

The official religion in Bhutan is Buddhism, which is practiced by 74.7% of the population. Hinduism is followed by 22.6% of the Population.

The freedom of religion is guaranteed by the King.

In the past, approximately 75% of the population of 770,000 followed either the Drukpa Lineage of the Kagyu school, the Nyingma school of Tibetan Buddhism or another school of Buddhism. Almost 22% of citizens (mainly Lhotshampas) practiced Hinduism.

== Languages ==
1. Tshangla (sometimes referred to as Sharchopkha) (28.0%)
2. Dzongkha (official) (24.0%)
3. Nepali (locally referred as Lhotshamkha) (22.0%)
4. Other (26.0%)
