= Dhaniram Toto =

Indian Toto language writer and Padma Shri awardee (born 1964)

- Born: 1964 (age 61–62); Totopara, Madarihat-Birpara CD Block, Alipurduar district, West Bengal, India
- Occupations: Government employee, writer, language activist
- Notable work: Dhanua Toto Kathamala; Dumra Thirte; Dhanua Nadir Tire; Uttal Torsa
- Spouse: Champa Toto
- Children: Sanjay Toto, Ranjay Toto, Dhananjay Toto, and one daughter
- Parent(s): Amepa Toto (father); Lakshmini Toto (mother)
- Awards: Padma Shri

Dhaniram Toto (born 1964) is an Indian writer, language activist and government employee from the Toto community of West Bengal. He is known for developing the script of the endangered Toto language and for his literary contributions in the language. In 2023, he was awarded the Padma Shri, India's fourth-highest civilian award, in the field of Literature and Education.

== Early life and education ==
Dhaniram Toto was born in Totopara village under the Madarihat-Birpara Community Development Block of Alipurduar district, West Bengal. He is the middle son of Amepa Toto and Lakshmini Toto. His father served as the last traditional head of the Toto community's indigenous council.

He studied up to Class X but could not continue regular education following the death of his father in 1976. He later completed his secondary education through the West Bengal Rabindra Mukta Vidyalaya Parishad. He subsequently joined the Backward Classes Welfare and Tribal Development Department of the Government of West Bengal and was later promoted to an official post.

== Literary career ==
Toto has written poetry, novels and essays in the Toto language. His notable works include:

- Uttal Torsa and Dhanua Toto Kathamala

== Creation of the Toto script ==
Although the Toto language belongs to the Sino-Tibetan family, it historically lacked an independent script and was written using the Bengali script. In 2005, Dhaniram Toto began efforts to develop a distinct writing system for the language.

He collaborated with Australian linguist Toby Anderson during the process. After nearly a decade of research and experimentation, the Toto script was formally introduced on 22 May 2015. The script consists of 22 consonants, 9 vowels and 6 diphthongs, totalling 37 characters.

The script has received international recognition, including registration under ISO 15924 (Code: Toto/294). His work is regarded as a significant step in safeguarding the linguistic identity of the Toto community.

== Awards ==
- Padma Shri in Literature and Education (2023)

== See also ==
- Toto language
