= Toto people =

Indian ethnic group

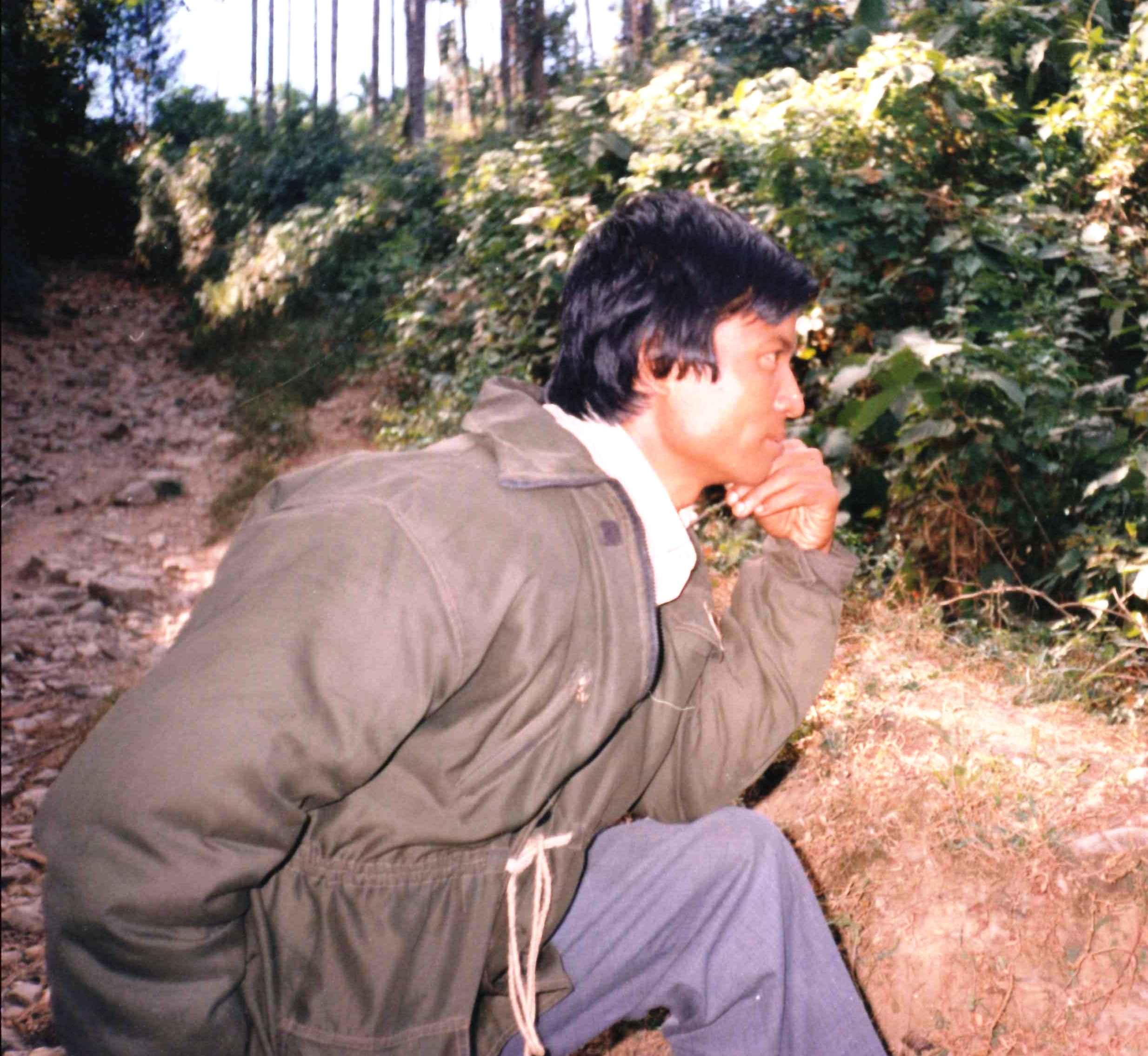
Dhaniram Toto, the first Padma Shri awardee from the Toto community Totopara Signboard

The Toto people are one of the world's smallest indigenous ethnic groups, living in a village of Totopara on India's border with Bhutan. (Note: Gurvinder Singh (2021): "The entire population of one of the world’s smallest indigenous groups, the Toto, live in a village on the India-Bhutan border.") Totos were nearly becoming extinct in the 1950s, but recent measures to safeguard their areas from being swamped with outsiders have helped preserve their unique heritage and also helped the population grow. The total population of Totos according to 1951 census was 321 living in 69 different houses at Totopara. In 1991 census, the Toto population had increased to 926 who lived in 180 different houses. In the 2001 census, their number had increased to 1184 — all living in Totopara.

Anthropologists agree that the Toto culture and language is totally unique to the ethnic group, and is clearly distinguished from the neighbouring Rajbongshis, Koch, Mech or the Bhutanese Sharchop ethnic groups.

== Toto culture ==
Toto language belongs to Tibeto-Burman family of sub-Himalayan group, as classified by Hodgson and Grierson. Until the start of the 21 century, the language did not have a script. A script was developed for the language by community elder Dhaniram Toto in 2015, and has seen limited but increasing use in literature, education, and computing; a proposal for encoding this script was accepted by the Unicode technical committee on October 8, 2019. It was added to the Unicode Standard with the release of version 14.0 in September 2021.

Toto family is patrilocal in nature dominated by nuclear type. However, joint family is not rare. Monogamy is common form of marriage among the Toto but polygamy is not prohibited. If a man's wife dies, he may marry the deceased wife's younger sister, but a woman cannot marry her deceased husband's brother. On the death of a spouse, the husband or wife must remain single for twelve months before he or she is free to remarry. There are various ways of acquiring mates viz., (1) marriage by negotiation (Thulbehoea), (2) marriage by escape (Chor-behoea), (3) marriage by capture (Sambehoea) and (4) love marriage (Lamalami). There is no custom of divorce among the Totos.

The Totos define themselves close to nature, they mainly perform Nature worship. The Totos have two main gods whom they worship:

1. Ishpa - He is supposed to live in the Bhutan hills, and causes sickness when displeased. The Totos offer him animal sacrifices and Eu.
2. Cheima - She keeps the village and its people safe from troubles and sicknesses. She is also offered rice, fowls and Eu. The Totos have priests, also offer their worship and sacrifices on their own. Ishpa is worshipped in the open outside the house and Cheima inside the house.

Of late, there are a few Christian converts among the ethnic group, largely attributed to Christian missionary works.

== Economic activities ==
Totos cultivate land. The Totos are not active farmers and hence do not cultivate a particular crop to a great extent. Every home has a kitchen garden surrounded by bamboo fences; in these gardens they grow vegetables, potatoes and bananas, among others. Sometimes they trade with traders from the outside world. Some Totos raise cows and pigs as an occupation.

At different stages of history, the Totos has been moving away from a subsistence economy to market economy. Further, the transformations of the village from community ownership of land to individual land holding and from isolated tribal group to a multi-ethnic habitat have also taken place in the recent past.

The sale of betel nuts is the primary source of income in Totopara.

== Totopara: The Toto village ==
The area of entire Toto country called Totopara is 1,996.96 acres (8.0814 km^{2}). It lies 22 km from Madarihat, the entrance of Jaldapara National Park. So, it can be safely assumed that the Totos live near the northern edges of this forest. The Toto localities of the village are sub-divided into six segments - Panchayatgaon, Mandolgaon, Subbagaon, Mitranggaon, Pujagaon and Dumchigaon. Totopara also has a settlement of Nepali-speaking people. A primary school was established in the village in 1990. Later in 1995, a high school with hostel facility was also established there. There is one primary healthcare centre in Totopara.

== See also ==
- Toto language
- Duarshi
