= Kalaktang Monpa language =

Sino-Tibetan language of India

Kalaktang Monpa
- Region: Arunachal Pradesh
- Native speakers: 8000 (2005)
- Language family: Sino-Tibetan: Tibeto-Burman?; Tibeto-Kanauri?; Kalaktang–Tshangla; Kalaktang Monpa

Language codes
- ISO 639-3: kkf
- Glottolog: kala1376

Kalaktang Monpa is an underdocumented Sino-Tibetan language spoken in West Kameng district, Arunachal Pradesh, India.

== Classification ==
Kalaktang Monpa should not be confused with the Takpa language known under the name Tawang Monpa in India. It is also distinct from the neighboring Dirang Monpa language. According to Roger Blench, Tshangla as spoken in Bhutan is the closest external relative of Kalaktang Monpa. Glottolog classifies Kalaktang Monpa under Tshanglic, a sub-branch of the Bodic languages.
