= Totopara =

- Village
- Location in West Bengal, India Totopara (India)
- Coordinates: 26.83°N 89.31°E
- Country: India
- State: West Bengal
- District: Alipurduar

Government
  - Type: Panchayati raj (India)
  - Body: Gram panchayat

Population (2011)
  - Total: 2,960
- Time zone: UTC+5:30 (IST)
- Postal code: 735220
- ISO 3166 code: IN-WB
- Vehicle registration: WB
- Website: wb.gov.in

Totopara is a village in the Madarihat-Birpara CD block in the Alipurduar subdivision of the Alipurduar district of West Bengal, India.

== Geography ==
Places and tea estates in the western portion of Alipurdar subdivision (including Madarihat-Birpara, Falakata and Alipuduar I CD blocks) in Alipurduar district
CT: census town, R: rural/ urban centre, N: neighbourhood, NP: national park/ wildlife sanctuary, TE: tea estate
Abbreviations used in names – TG for Tea Garden (town/village), TE for Tea Estate
Owing to space constraints in the small map, the actual locations in a larger map may vary slightly

=== Location ===
Totopara is located at 26.83°N 89.31°E.

Administratively, this village falls under the Madarihat police station. It is bounded by the foothills of Bhutan to the north, Torsa River to the east, and the Titi reserve forest on the south-west separated by the Hauri river. The nearest village is Ballalguri, which is about 5 km to the south of Totopara. There is a single lane motorable road leading to this village from the National Highway 31 through Hantapara. The area of the village is about 8.08 km^{2}. The village is about 22 km from Madarihat, which is the entry point of the famous Jaldapara National Park.

=== Area overview ===
Alipurduar district is covered by two maps. It is an extensive area in the eastern end of the Dooars in West Bengal. It is undulating country, largely forested, with numerous rivers flowing down from the outer ranges of the Himalayas in Bhutan. It is a predominantly rural area with 79.38% of the population living in the rural areas. The district has 1 municipal town and 20 census towns and that means that 20.62% of the population lives in urban areas. The scheduled castes and scheduled tribes, taken together, form more than half the population in all the six community development blocks in the district. There is a high concentration of tribal people (scheduled tribes) in the three northern blocks of the district.

Note: The map alongside presents some of the notable locations in the subdivision. All places marked in the map are linked in the larger full screen map.

== Demographics ==
As per the 2011 Census of India, Totopara had a total population of 2,960. There were 1,568 (53%) males and 1,392 (47%) females. There were 400 persons in the age range of 0 to 6 years. The total number of literate people in Totopara was 1,486 (58.05% of the population over 6 years).

== Education ==
In 1990 a primary school was opened to cater to the children of the village and since 1995, a high school with hostel facility was also opened. There is one primary health centre in the village.

== Culture ==
This village is home to the Toto tribe.
