= Bhutanese Citizenship Act 1958 =

Legislative Act of Bhutan

The Bhutanese Citizenship Act of 1958, officially the Nationality Law of Bhutan, 1958, is a decree by the Druk Gyalpo King Jigme Dorji Wangchuck, recognizing the definition of a Bhutanese citizen. The Act was amended in 1977 and then superseded by the Citizenship Act of 1985.

== Provisions of the 1958 Act ==
The preamble and first two articles of the Act describe its promulgation as a series of changes to the previous nationality law. It also states that King Jigme Dorji Wangchuck promulgated the Act on the advice of royal advisers, the Bhutanese people, and the monastic body. They also define its name and jurisdiction – the Kingdom of Bhutan.

=== Bona fide Bhutanese nationals ===
The Act's third article provides Bhutanese citizenship to residents whose fathers are Bhutanese nationals, and to children born anywhere after the enactment of the Act whose fathers are Bhutanese nationals at the time of the child's birth. This provision is an example of a patrilineal jus sanguinis, or blood-based, nationality law. The provisions of this article contain the only statements of citizenship as a matter of right within the Act.

=== Naturalization ===
The Act's fourth article provides a framework for two paths of naturalization. Foreigners who have reached the age of majority and are eligible may present a petition to an official appointed by the King and take an oath of loyalty "according to the rules laid down by the official" and be enrolled as a Bhutanese national. Eligibility for naturalization requires applicants be residents of Bhutan for more than fifteen years and own agricultural land within the kingdom.

Naturalization is also available to wives of Bhutanese nationals who submit a petition and take the oath of loyalty "to the satisfaction of the concerned official," provided that they have reached the age of majority and are otherwise eligible.

Those who have been deprived of, have renounced, or have forfeited Bhutanese nationality cannot become a Bhutanese national again unless the king gives his approval. The provisions of this article illustrate a high degree of discretion, particularly at the administrative level, in granting Bhutanese citizenship.

The Act's fifth article provides the basic process of naturalization as well as further conditions. Foreigners who submit a petition to the King may receive a Bhutanese Nationality Certificate provided they have served satisfactorily in Government service for at least five years in addition to the ten year residency requirement. Once the certificate is received, applicants may take the oath of loyalty "according to rules laid down by the Government" to be enrolled as a Bhutanese national. Applicants may receive a Nationality Certificate provided that in the opinion of the King their conduct and service as a Government servant are satisfactory. The provisions of this article illustrate a high degree of discretion at the highest levels of government in granting Bhutanese citizenship.

=== Loss of nationality ===
The Act's sixth article provides the grounds for forfeiture of citizenship. Bhutanese nationals who become citizens of foreign countries where they reside; who have renounced Bhutanese nationality having settled abroad; who claim to be citizens of a foreign country or who pledge an oath of loyalty to that country; who have naturalized but have since left their agricultural land or stopped residing in Bhutan; or who are bona fide nationals but have stopped residing in Bhutan or failed to observe the laws of Bhutan all forfeit their Bhutanese nationality. This provision emphasizes continual residency as a requirement for citizenship and discourages residency abroad.

The Act's seventh article provides further grounds for deprivation of citizenship. It states that the government may cancel Certificates of Nationality obtained on presentation of false information or omission of facts. It also provides that the government may deprive citizens of their citizenship without notice if they engage in activities or speech against the King or the people of Bhutan; if they conduct business with, correspond with, or aid enemies during war; and if they are imprisoned in any country for more than one year within five years of attaining Bhutanese nationality. Such a provision is an example of laws on fraud, sedition and treason as well as a policy against allowing serious criminals or convicted felons.

=== Further provisions ===
The Act's eighth article provides that the King may incorporate additional rules if necessary for the implementation of the Act. This article also illustrates a supreme degree of discretion and authority vested in the King, including his ability to enact ad hoc changes to the law.

The ninth article provides that the Act supersedes all previous laws, rules and regulations, ordinances relating to the acquisition and forfeiture of Bhutanese nationality.

== Amendments of 1977 ==
The 1958 Citizenship Act was altered by the Bhutanese royal government in 1977 through a series of amendments titled "Act on Grant of Citizenship in Bhutan". The 1977 Amendments supersede all conflicting prior law. The 1977 Amendments introduced both substantive and procedural changes in Bhutanese citizenship law, clarifying the role of the Ministry of Home Affairs. The Amendments enacted further conditions and procedures for naturalization, namely lengthening the residency requirement. They further clarified the status of certain bona fide Bhutanese citizens abroad and refined the requirements and procedures surrounding census registration. The Amendments also restate loss of citizenship as the penalty for sedition.

=== Naturalization ===
In Article KA (ཀ), the residency requirement for naturalization is lengthened to 15 years for those in the service of the Bhutanese government and 20 years for all other applicants. In addition, foreigners are required to show "some knowledge" of written and spoken Bhutanese and the history of Bhutan in order to apply to the Ministry of Home Affairs. After investigating, the Ministry forwards the application to the royal government.

Article KHA (ཁ) provides that the power to grant or reject applications rests solely with the royal government, and disclaims that the fulfillment of all conditions does not guarantee applicants' eligibility.

This Article also prohibits dual citizenship, naturalization of criminals, and naturalization of those "related to any person involved in activities against the people, the country and the King." This law is an example of a de jure imputation of political opinion.

Article KHA also requires naturalized citizens to register their names in the census record of the royal government from the date of naturalization, and to take an oath administered by the Home Minister.

This Article codifies a particular oath of citizenship, which pledges allegiance to the King alone, pledges to obey the law and to "observe all the customs and traditions of the people of Bhutan." The oath pledges "not [to] commit any act against the country, the people and the King." The oath is then solemnized in the name of Yeshey Goempo and with a promise to serve the country to the best of one's ability.

The next Article, GA (ག), permits a Special Grant of Citizenship to foreigners with "special or extraordinary qualifications" to be granted citizenship, waiving all conditions except for the administration of the oath. This is a significant substantive and procedural departure from the original 1958 Act.

=== Renouncement and reacquisition of citizenship ===
Article NGA (ང) requires citizens who leave Bhutan, return, and apply for citizenship to undergo "probation for a period of at least two years." If the applicant is successful, this Article grants citizenship for applicants provided they are "not responsible for any activities against the Royal Government." This is another significant substantive and procedural departure from the original 1958 Act. The maximum duration and exact investigatory nature of the probation period are undefined, however, apparently leaving much to discretion.

Naturalized Bhutanese citizens may renounce Bhutanese citizenship ("apply for permission to emigrate" from Bhutan) together with their family members. The government grants the request after an investigation. Thereafter, the same person may not re-apply for Bhutanese citizenship. Adult family members who wish to remain in Bhutan may apply to remain. After the Home Minister investigates the matter, the government permit adult family members to remain in Bhutan "after ascertaining that Bhutan's interest is not harmed." There are, however, no guidelines for approval, which thus appears highly discretionary.

This Article preemptively stays requests of both bona fide Bhutanese and naturalized Bhutanese citizens to emigrate during times of crises such as war.

=== Transmission of citizenship ===
Article CHA (ཅ) restates the patrilineal jus sanguinis law under the 1958 Act in explicit terms.

This Article also deprives Bhutanese citizenship from those who reside abroad outside the service of the royal government, private business, or religious practices, and who live abroad serving foreign governments and people, or who have settled abroad or hold official posts in a foreign government.

=== Registration procedure and authentication ===
Article CHHA (ཆ) requires all children of Bhutanese citizen fathers to be registered in the official record within one year of birth whether born inside or outside Bhutan. It also requires all children born within the country to be listed with the Dzongkhag or the Dungkhag of their birth. It further requires children of Bhutanese parents born abroad to be recorded at the Bhutanese Embassy, or through correspondence to the Home Ministry. It allows local authorities to apply to the Home Ministry for census registration on behalf of children over the age of one. The Ministry has the authority to investigate the matter, grant, and deny registration. This is a further significant substantive and procedural departure from the original 1958 Act, which did not address census registration of infants.

Article JA (ཇ) provides that all census records must bear the seal of the royal government and the signature of an officer no lower in rank than Dzongdag (district administrator; there are twenty in all Bhutan), and bars consideration of other records. This substantive addition to the law prevents the consideration of gewog, village, and other civil documentation.

Article NYA (ཉ) provides that all fraudulent Kashos (certificates) not granted by the King himself be investigated by the Home Minister and reported to the royal government.

=== Penalty for violations ===
The sole penalty is deprivation of citizenship. Article TA (ཏ) restates the 1958 law that punishes all citizens who are "involved in acts against the King or speaks against the Royal Government or associates with people involved in activities against the Royal Government" with deprivation of citizenship. This Article also punishes anyone who knowingly presents false information during naturalization with deprivation of citizenship "after due verification of the false information presented." On its face, this law represents a procedural safeguard, or an element of due process, on the tails of Bhutan's sedition and speech laws. This law is also an example of de jure imputation of political opinion by the government due to association.

== Repeal ==
The Act and its Amendments were superseded on June 10, 1985 by the Citizenship Act of 1985.

== See also ==
- Bhutanese nationality law
- Immigration in Bhutan
- Law of Bhutan
- Politics of Bhutan
- Bhutanese refugees
- Nationality law
- Jus sanguinis
- Bhutan
