= Ngalop people =

Tibetan origin people in Bhutan

Ngalop
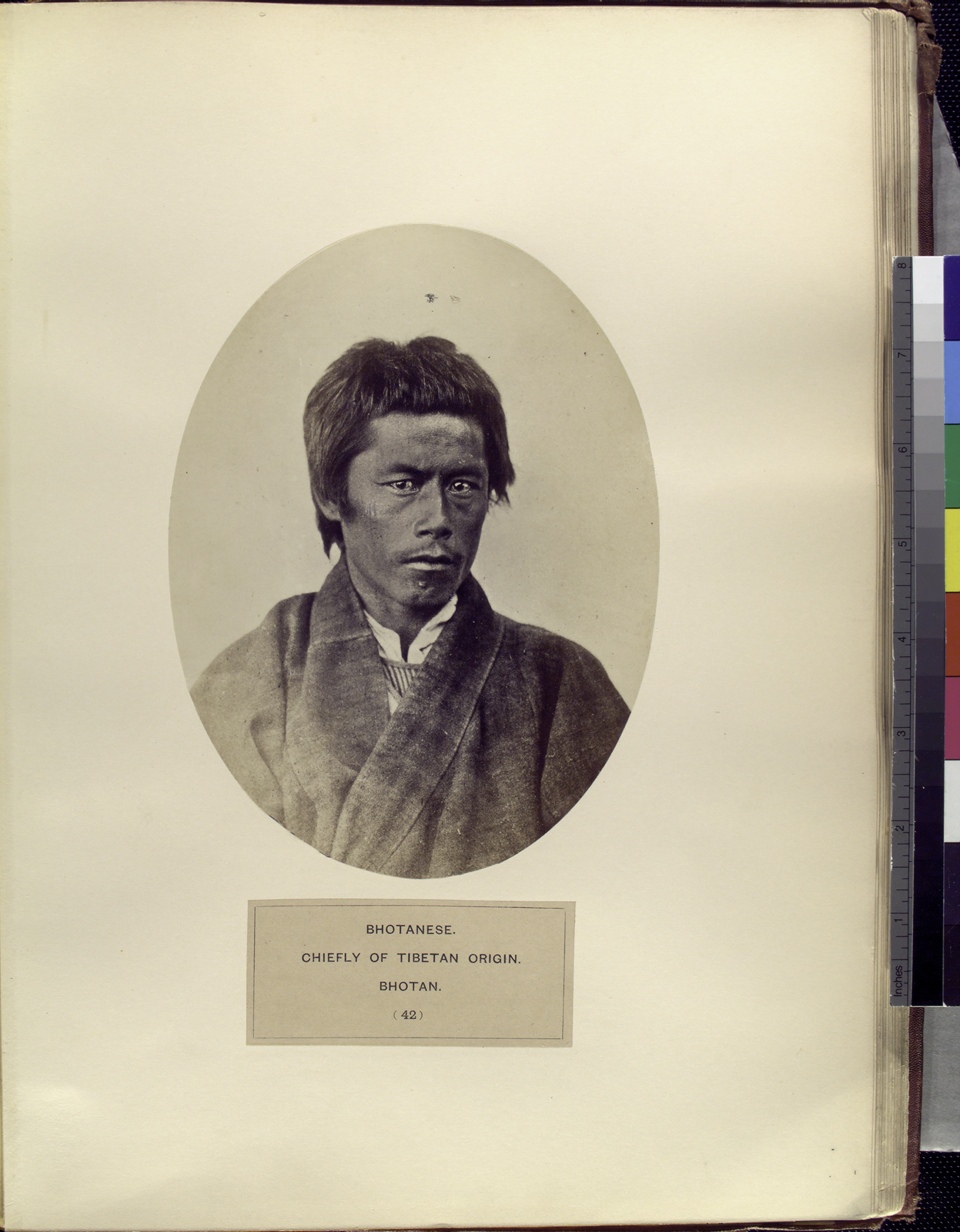
- Bhotanese Ngalop in 1868

Total population
- 708,500

Regions with significant populations
- Western, Northern and parts of South-East and South Bhutan (Thimphu, Gasa, Punakha, Wangdue Phodrang, Haa, Paro, Chukha)

Languages
- Dzongkha

Religion
- Tibetan Buddhist sect of Vajrayana Buddhism · Bon

Related ethnic groups
- Tibetans · Layaps · Monpa · Sharchop · Other Sino-Tibetan-speaking peoples

The Ngalop (Dzongkha: སྔ་ལོང་པ་ Wylie: snga long pa; "earliest risen people" or "first converted people" according to folk etymology) are people of ethnic Tibetan origin who migrated from Tibet to Bhutan as early as the ninth century. Orientalists adopted the term "Bhote" or Bhotiya, meaning literally "people of Bod (Tibet)", a term also applied to the Tibetan people, leading to confusion, and now is rarely used in reference to the Ngalop.

The Ngalop introduced Tibetan culture and Buddhism to Bhutan and comprise the dominant political and cultural element in modern Bhutan. Furthermore, cultural, ethnic, and linguistic identity in Bhutan are not always mutually exclusive. For these reasons, Ngalops are often simply identified as Bhutanese. Their language, Dzongkha, is the national language and is descended from Old Tibetan. The Ngalop are dominant in western and northern Bhutan, including Thimphu and the Dzongkha-speaking region. The term Ngalop may subsume several related linguistic and cultural groups, such as the Sharchop, Kheng people and speakers of Bumthang language.

== Population ==
The Ngalop are concentrated in the western and central valleys of Bhutan, whose total population in 2010 was about 708,500 (This is the total population of Bhutan, not the population of Ngalops. The population of Ngalops could be less than 250000) . Together the Ngalop, Sharchops and tribal groups constituted up to 72 percent of the population in the late 1980s according to official Bhutanese statistics. The 1981 census claimed Sharchops represented 30% of the population and Ngalops about 17%. The World Factbook estimates the "Bhote" Ngalop and Sharchop populations together to total about 50 percent, or 354,200.

== Language ==
Ngalops speak Dzongkha. As Ngalops are politically and culturally dominant in Bhutan, Dzongkha is the language of government and education throughout the kingdom. Other groups that identify as culturally Ngalop speak the Tshangla (Sharchop), Kheng and Bumthang languages.

== Religion ==
Ngalops largely follow Tibetan Buddhism, particularly the Drukpa Lineage of the Kagyu school of Vajrayana that is the state religion of Bhutan. A significant number also follow the Nyingma school, which was dominant in early Bhutanese history.

=== Bon ===
Bon practitioners are a minority, although the practices of the Ngalops, like that of most Bhutanese, are characterized by incorporated elements of the older ethnic religion that is also referred to by the term Bon.

== Lifestyle ==
The primary agricultural crops are Bhutanese red rice, potatoes, barley, and other temperate climate crops. Ngalop people build houses out of timber, stone, clay, and brick. The Ngalop are also known for building large fortress-monasteries known as dzongs that now serve as government offices. The Druk Gyalpo and most of the government are Ngalop, and all citizens of the country are required to follow the national dress code, the driglam namzha, which is Ngalop in origin.

The Ngalops follow matrilineal lines in the inheritance of land and livestock.

== See also ==
- Ethnic groups in Bhutan
- Bhutanese diaspora
