= Sharchops =

Sharchop
Total population
- 212,500

Regions with significant populations
- Eastern Bhutan (Lhuntse, Trashiyangtse, Mongar, Pemagatshel, Trashigang, Samdrup Jongkhar); Southwest China (Tibet Autonomous Region) Northeast India (Assam and Arunachal Pradesh (Monpa tribes: Khalaktang, Dirang; Memba tribe: Tuting))

Languages
- Tshangla · Monpa languages · Dzongkha · Tibetan Languages

Religion
- Tibetan Buddhism · Bon

Related ethnic groups
- Monpa · Ngalop · Tibetan people

The Sharchops (Dzongkha: ཤར་ཕྱོགས་པ, Wylie: shar phyogs pa; "Easterner") are the populations of mixed Tibetan and Southeast Asian descent that mostly live in the eastern districts of Bhutan.

== Ethnicity ==
The Sharchops people may or may not have migrated from Assam, Arunachal Pradesh, or possibly Burma, c. 1200 – c. 800 BC. Van Driem (1993) indicates that Sharchops are closely related to the Mönpa and that both are descendants of the indigenous Tibetic peoples (pre-Ngalop) of Bhutan. The Sharchops are the largest ethnic group in Bhutan.

== Population ==
The Sharchops comprise most of the population of eastern Bhutan, a country whose total population in 2010 was approximately 708,500. Although they have long been the largest single ethnic group in Bhutan, the Sharchop have been largely assimilated into the culturally and politically dominant Tibetic Ngalop culture. Together, the Ngalop, Sharchop, and tribal groups constituted up to 72 percent of the population in the late 1980s, according to official Bhutanese statistics. The 1981 census claimed that Sharchops represented 30% of the population, and Ngalops approximately 17%. The World Factbook, however, estimates that the Ngalop and the Sharchop ethnic groups together comprise approximately 50% of Bhutan's population, at 354,200 people. Assuming Sharchops still outnumber Ngalops at a 3:2 ratio, the total population of Sharchops in Bhutan is approximately 212,500.

== Language ==
Most Sharchops speak Tshangla, a Tibeto-Burman language. They also learn the national language, Dzongkha. Because of their proximity to Northeastern India, some speak Assamese. Bodo is also known to many of them because of socio cultural and trade relations.

Tshangla is also spoken by the Monpa (Menba) national minority across the border in China, distributed in Mêdog, Nyingchi and Dirang. Tshangla is similar to the Kalaktang and Dirang languages spoken by the Monpa of Arunachal Pradesh, India.

== Lifestyle ==
Sharchop peoples practice slash-and-burn and tsheri agriculture, planting dry rice crops for three or four years until the soil is exhausted and then moving on, however the practice has been officially banned in Bhutan since 1969.

Most of the Sharchops follow matrilineal lines in the inheritance of land and livestock.

== Religion ==
Most Sharchops follow Tibetan Buddhism with some elements of Bön, although those who live in the Duars follow Animism.

== See also ==
- Ethnic groups in Bhutan
  - Monpa people
  - Ngalop people
  - Lhotshampa
  - Toto people
- Demographics of Bhutan
