= Tshangla language =

Eastern language of Bhutan

Tshangla
- Native to: Bhutan, India, Tibet
- Ethnicity: Sharchops, Monpa, Pemako Tibetans
- Native speakers: (170,000 cited 1999–2007)
- Language family: Sino-Tibetan: Tibeto-Burman; Bodic Languages; Bodish Languages?; Kalaktang–Tshangla; Tshangla
- Dialects: Bhutan Tshangla (Trashigang); West Kameng (Kalaktang and Dirang, West Kameng, India); Pemako (Tibet)
- Writing system: none official; Tibetan used

Language codes
- ISO 639-3: Either: tsj – Tshangla kkf – Kalaktang Monpa (?)
- Glottolog: tsha1247
- Tshangla is classified as Vulnerable by the UNESCO Atlas of the World's Languages in Danger

Tshangla is a Sino-Tibetan language of the Bodish branch closely related to the Tibetic languages. Tshangla is primarily spoken in Eastern Bhutan and acts as a lingua franca in the region; it is also spoken in the adjoining Tawang tract in the Indian state of Arunachal Pradesh and the Pemako region of Tibet. Tshangla is the principal pre-Tibetic language of Bhutan.

== Classification ==
Tshangla is frequently assumed to be close to the Tibetic languages. Bradley (2002) includes in among the East Bodish languages. Van Driem (2011), however, leaves it unclassified within Sino-Tibetan, pending further research.

Bodt (2012:188-189) classifies Tshangla as a Bodish language, but notes that Tshangla (like East Bodish) is related to, but not directly descended, from Classical Tibetan.

Grollmann & Gerber (2023) note that Tshangla is not particularly closely related to Bodish at all and should be placed in a separate part of the Sino-Tibetan (also referred to as Trans-Himalayan) linguistic phylum.

== Varieties ==
Tshangla is a dialect cluster consisting of a few mutually unintelligible language varieties, including (Gerber 2018):

- Trashigang
- Dungsam
- Dirang
- Bjokapakha (Bjoka)

The Tshangla variety of Trashigang town is used as a lingua franca. Dungsam is conservative, while Dirang and Bjokapakha are divergent.

== Number of speakers and status of the language ==
Tshangla is primarily spoken in East and Southeast Bhutan, especially in the Trashigang district. The language is referred to as “Sharchopkha” meaning 'the people in the east' in Dzongkha, the national language of Bhutan.

It is also spoken in the Arunachal Pradesh of India, where it is sometimes referred to as “Central Monpa”, and in Southeast Tibet.

There are approximately 170,000 speakers of Tshangla, living in Bhutan (157,000), India (11,000) and Tibet (7000). It is not reported to be endangered in any way, as there are still many children learning it as their first language. Indeed, it is often described as being the majority language of eastern Bhutan, where it functions as something of a lingua franca. Andvic (2010: 4) reports that “most Bhutanese have at least some rudimentary knowledge of Tshangla”. In addition, it is common for Western Bhutanese to learn some Tshangla through classmates in the school system (Yang Gyeltshen, p.c.).

Despite its predominance in eastern Bhutan, Tshangla is described by Andvik (2010: 4) as “an unwritten language”, meaning that it “is not in any country standardized by governing fiat, taught in the schools, recognized as an official language, or even given status as a minority language.” However, Ethnologue reports that 47% of L1 speakers are literate, mainly using the Tibetan Uchen script. Though there are no official publications in Tshangla, the language is used in radio and television broadcasts. (It remains undetermined what kind of orthography is used for writing copy for those broadcasts; Yang Gyeltshen, p.c.)

The official national language of Bhutan is Dzongkha, which is derived from the Tibetan spoken by Lama Shabdrung and his followers, who left Tibet to found the nation of Bhutan in the 1600s. Tshangla, however, is one of Bhutan's many indigenous languages and is the most widely spoken of the indigenous Sino-Tibetan languages.

Tshangla is found scattered throughout eastern Himalayan ridges as well as the southern regions, spoken by around 175,000 people. Most of the Tshangla populace live in Eastern Bhutan (Trashigang, eastern Pemagatshel, Samdrup Jongkhar, eastern Mongar, and Trashiyangtse districts), where they formed a major ethnic group of the country, probably accounting for 25-30% of the total population. Scattered Tshangla speakers can also be found in neighbouring countries with different names.

In the Indian state of Arunachal Pradesh, they are called Kalaktang Monpa (and are lexically distinct). whereas about 7,000 Tshangla-speaking people also live in Pemako (Bomê and Mêdog County) in southeastern Tibet, China and India. There are about 8,000 Kalaktang Monpa speakers in Khalaktang, Balimu, and Tomko villages, Kalaktang administrative center, West Kameng district, Arunachal Pradesh, India (Ethnologue). About 1000 to 15000 Tsangla speakers are also live in Tuting Town, Kopu, Bona, Gelling, Bishing along the Tsangpo (Siang) river and Nyering, Payingdem, Nyukong, Yortong, Mankota, Tashigong, Singa along the Yangsang Chu river, Upper Siang District, Arunachal Pradesh, India.

The distantly related 'Olekha language of the Black Mountains, also called "Monpa" and predating Dzongkha, belongs to the Sino-Tibetan East Bodish languages. 'Olekha is most closely related to the Bumthang language; both are East Bodish languages. Tshangla and related languages form a sister branch not to the East Bodish group, but to its parent Bodish branch. Thus the ambiguous term "Monpa" risks separating languages that should be grouped together, while grouping languages together that are quite separate.

== Writing system ==
Tshangla is traditionally an unwritten language and has no official status in any country. When written by native speakers, it is most often rendered in Tibetan script, however grammarians have devised a romanized transcription system.

== Phonology ==
Below appears a table of Tshangla consonants according to Andvik (2010). Non-native phonemes, in parentheses, are contrasted only marginally with native sounds: /ɬ/ is often nativized to /l/; /dz/ becomes /z/; and /ʑ/ becomes /j/.

Tshangla consonants
		Labial	Alveolar	Retroflex	Palatal	Velar	Glottal
Approximant		w ⟨w ཝ⟩			j ⟨y ཡ⟩		h ⟨h ཧ⟩
Nasal		m ⟨m མ⟩	n ⟨n ན⟩		ɲ ⟨ny ཉ⟩	ŋ ⟨ng ང⟩	
Plosive	voiceless	p ⟨p པ⟩	t ⟨t ཏ⟩	ʈ ⟨tr ཏྲ⟩		k ⟨k ཀ⟩	
Plosive	aspirated	pʰ ⟨ph ཕ⟩	tʰ ⟨th ཐ⟩	ʈʰ ⟨thr ཐྲ⟩		kʰ ⟨kh ཁ⟩	
Plosive	voiced	b ⟨b བ⟩	d ⟨d ད⟩	ɖ ⟨dr དྲ⟩		ɡ ⟨g ག⟩	
Affricate	voiceless		ts ⟨ts ཅ⟩		tɕ ⟨tsh ཆ⟩		
Affricate	voiced		(dz ⟨dz ཛ⟩)		dʑ ⟨j ཇ⟩		
Fricative	voiceless		s ⟨s ས⟩		ɕ ⟨sh ཤ⟩		
Fricative	voiced		z ⟨z ཟ⟩		(ʑ ⟨zh ཞ⟩)		
Lateral	voiceless		(ɬ ⟨lh ལྷ⟩)				
Lateral	voiced		l ⟨l ལ⟩				
Flap			r ⟨r ར⟩				

The above table generally describes onset consonants. Consonant clusters in the onset position are limited to consonant plus /r/, with the exception of the syllable /pɕi/, used in only two contexts. (Note: The cluster /pɕi/ is used only in the words for "four" (/pɕi/) and "to fart" (/pɕi pʰule/).) Intervocalic positioning of aspirated onsets /pʰ/ /tʰ/, and /kʰ/ results in lenition to /ɸ/, /θ/, and /x/ or /h/, respectively, with some exceptions. Syllable-final consonants are limited to /p/, /t/, /k/, /s/, /m/, /n/, and /ŋ/.

Tshangla vowels appear in the chart below, following Andvik (2010). Vowels in parentheses appear in non-native words inherited from Tibetan, Dzongkha, and the latter's archaic liturgical form, Chöke. Non-native front rounded vowels may be nativized as front unrounded vowels.

Tshangla vowels
	Front		Central	Back
	unrounded	rounded	unrounded	rounded
Close	i ⟨i ི⟩	(y ⟨ü ུ⟩)		u ⟨u ུ⟩
Mid	e ⟨e ེ⟩	(œ ⟨ö ོ⟩)		o ⟨o ོ⟩
Open			a ⟨a⟩	

Vowel clusters native to the Tshangla lexicon are /ai/ and /au/, and in derived contexts /oi/ and /ui/ also appear (e.g. a verbal ending: /bu-i/, take-IMP). In these native contexts, final /i/ and /u/ are pronounced as if they were /y/ or /w/, respectively. In loanwords /iu/ and /eu/ rarely appear, and tend to be realized as /iwu/ and /ewu/, respectively.

Basic Tshangla words
	Spoken	Romanized
Hello		Kuzu zangpo
Goodbye		Lassola
House		Phai
Boy		Za
Girl		Zamin
Friend		Charo (Bhutan)/Tosang
Younger brother		Bonying
Younger sister		Usa (Bhutan)/Zi
Older brother		Ata
Older sister		Ana

Tshangla Basic Phrases
	Spoken	Romanized
How are you?		Hang ten cha ya
What is your name?		Na ga mingsho hang ya?
My name is Galey		Ja ga ming Galey gila
I live in Bhutan		Jang druk ga choncha
I know Tshangla		Ji tshangla sencha

Tshangla Basic Counting
Number	Tshangla	Number	Tshangla
1	Thur	11	Songthur
2	Niktsing	12	Songniktsing
3	Sum	13	Songsum
4	Phi	14	Songphi
5	Nga	15	Songnga
6	Khung	16	Songkhung
7	Zuum	17	Songzuum
8	Yen	18	Songyen
9	Guu	19	Songguu
10	Say	20	Songsay

== Tone ==
Most dialects of Tshangla do not make lexical distinctions according to tone, however, the language overall may be in the process of tonogenesis. Some dialects such as those of Central Monpa and Padma-bkod have replaced voiceless-voiced contrasts with a high-low tone distinction, respectively.

== Grammar ==
Tshangla grammar features nouns, adjectives, adverbs, and verbs. Word order is generally subject–object–verb (SOV). Its morphology is generally agglutinative, though most unmarked Tshangla lexicon comprises one or two syllables. Nouns are arranged into either head-first or head-last noun phrases. Demonstratives, relative clauses, and genitive phrases precede nouns, whereas markers for definiteness, number, topic, focus, case, and other particles follow the noun.

While adjectives comprise a lexically distinct category in their own right, some adjectival words are grammatically nouns. This dichotomy is complicated by equally common relative clauses that function as adjectives. For example, dukpu waktsa means "(the) badly poor child," and waktsa dukpu means "(the) child who is badly poor." Some combinations are strictly noun-adjective, however.

Tshangla is a pro-drop language, with two otherwise notable features. First, multi-valent verbs drop objects even though they are not recoverable from context, through which verbs reduce their valency (i.e. become intransitive). In other situations where the argument is topically important, and where confusion is impossible, a "zero" (impersonal) pronoun is used. Otherwise, personal pronouns are extensively used. They appear below:

Tshangla personal pronouns
	Singular	Dual	Plural
1p	jang	a-ching	ai
2p	nan	na-ching	nai
3p	ro	da-ching	rokte

When pronouns are followed by numbers, plurals are not used (e.g. ro nyiktsing, "the two of them").

Noun cases include absolutive (nominative), agentive (ergative)/instrumental (-gi), genitive (-ga-), ablative (-gai), and dative/locative (-ga). These suffices undergo devoicing in certain circumstances.

Verbs are generally transitive or intransitive. The transitivity of some verbs corresponds to lexical distinctions: yekpa means "to speak" in a transitive sense, but "to be called" in an intransitive sense. Similarly, lekpe means "to lick" in a transitive sense, but "to be licked" in an intransitive sense, with the agent suppressed.

The copula, which has many forms, is used extensively in marking Tshangla verbs. Verbs are marked differently depending on whether they are predicate (finite), or relative or participial (non-finite). Only finite verbs take personal conjugations, while various non-finite forms take different suffices. Adverbs appear as suffixes on non-final and participial verb forms.

Negation of adjectives, nouns, and verbs takes different forms. Sentence-final particles include interrogatory and non-declarative mood markers.

== Dialects ==
Tshangla dialects represent a continuum centered around the town of Trashigang, whose dialect is considered by Tshangla speakers to be the prestige dialect. Differences between dialects do not prevent mutual intelligibility, and many loanwords have come through Classical Tibetan (Chöke).

In Arunachal Pradesh, Tshangla is spoken by the Monpa tribe in the Kalaktang and Dirang area of West Kameng. The dialect there, called "Central Monpa", is spoken by some 6,000 people.

In Bhutan, Tshangla is virtually identical to the Tshangla (Chinese: 仓洛; pinyin: Cāngluò) of southeastern Tibet, also called "Mêdog (Bomê) Monpa". The Bomê County region of Tibet, formerly known as Padma-bkod or Pemako, contains remnants of these Tshangla communities separated by hundreds of miles.

== See also ==
- Tshangla comparative vocabulary list (Wiktionary)
- Languages of Bhutan
- Languages of China
