= Peopling of India =

Immigration patterns of different lineages of people of India

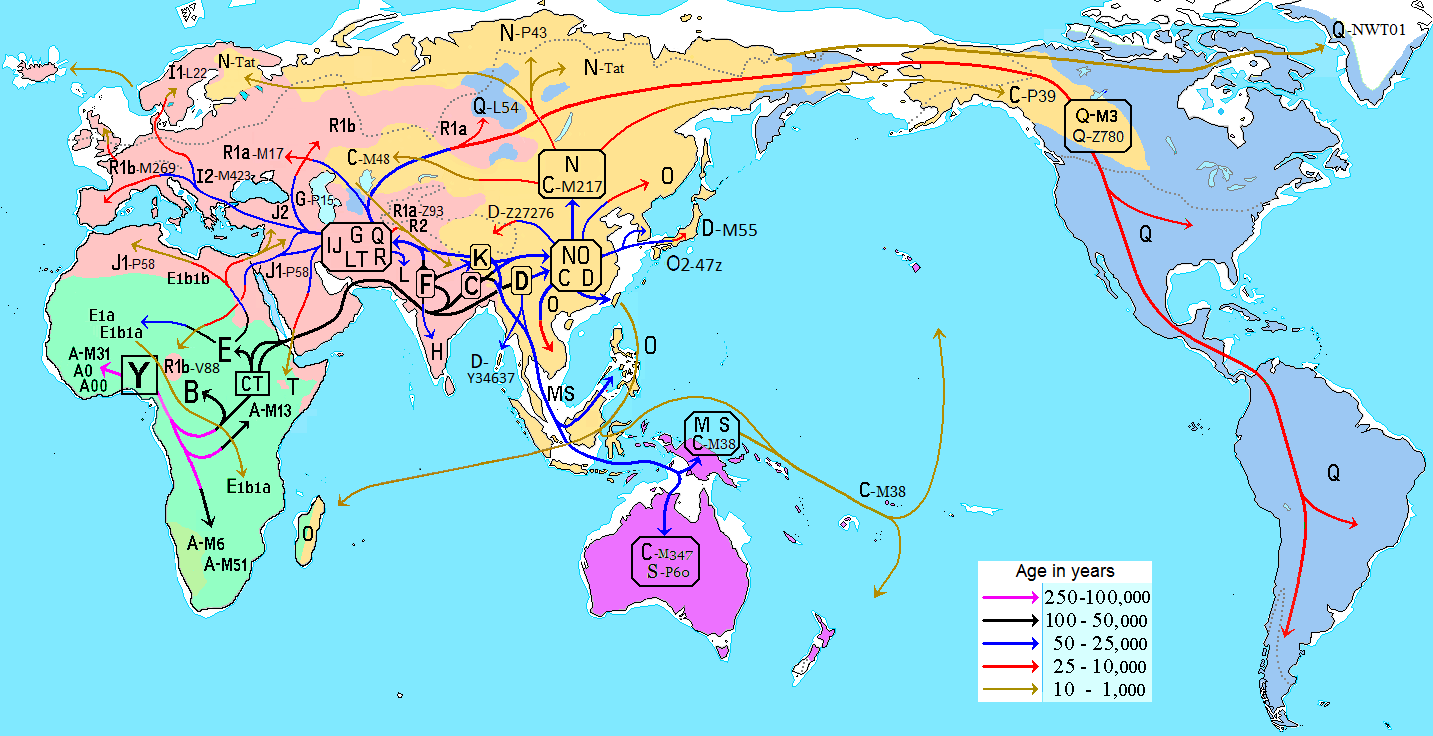
Successive dispersal of human lineages during the peopling of Afro-Eurasia.

The peopling of India refers to the migration of Homo sapiens into the Indian subcontinent. Anatomically modern humans settled India in multiple waves of early migrations, over tens of millennia. The first migrants came with the Coastal Migration/Southern Dispersal 65,000 years ago, whereafter complex migrations within South and Southeast Asia took place. West Asian Iranian hunter-gatherers migrated to South Asia after the Last Glacial Period but before the onset of farming. Together with ancient South Asian hunter-gatherers they formed the population of the Indus Valley Civilisation (IVC). The population of the IVC was the result of mixing between Iranian hunter gatherers and Ancient Ancestral South Indian (AASI).

With the decline of the IVC, and the migration of Indo-Europeans, the IVC-people contributed to the formation of both the Ancestral North Indians ("ANI"), who were related to contemporary West Eurasians, and the Ancestral South Indians ("ASI"), who were formed out of "Indus Periphery-related groups" who moved south and mixed further with local hunter-gatherers. These two ancestral populations, ASI and ANI, mixed somewhere between 1,900-4,200 years ago, after which a switch to endogamy took place. After the fall of the IVC there was significant southward migration of the IVC people, groups considered the ancestors of modern day Dravidians. The intermixing between ASI and ANI groups was substantial and affected both modern Indo-European populations as well as the Dravidian populations in the subcontinent. The migrations of the Munda people and the Sino-Tibetan-speaking people from East Asia also added new elements.

== First modern human settlers ==
=== Pre- or post-Toba ===
The dating of the earliest successful migration of modern humans out of Africa is a matter of dispute. It may have pre- or post-dated the Toba catastrophe, a volcanic super eruption that took place between 69,000 and 77,000 years ago at the site of present-day Lake Toba. According to Michael Petraglia, stone tools discovered below the layers of ash deposits in India at Jwalapuram, Andhra Pradesh point to a pre-Toba dispersal. The population who created these tools is not known with certainty as no human remains were found. An indication for post-Toba is haplogroup L3, that originated before the dispersal of humans out of Africa, and can be dated to 60,000–70,000 years ago, "suggesting that humanity left Africa a few thousand years after Toba."

==== Impact ====
It has been hypothesized that the Toba supereruption about 74,000 years ago destroyed much of India's central forests, covering it with a layer of volcanic ash, and may have brought humans worldwide to a state of near-extinction by suddenly plunging the planet into an ice-age that could have lasted for up to 1,800 years. If true, this may "explain the apparent bottleneck in human populations that geneticists believe occurred between 50,000 and 100,000 years ago" and the relative "lack of genetic diversity among humans alive today".

Since the Toba event is believed to have had such a harsh impact and "specifically blanketed the Indian subcontinent in a deep layer of ash", it was "difficult to see how India's first colonists could have survived this greatest of all disasters". Therefore, it was believed that all humans previously present in India went extinct during, or shortly after, this event and these first Indians left "no trace of their DNA in present-day humans" – a theory seemingly backed by genetic studies.

==== Pre-Toba tools ====
Research published in 2009 by a team led by Michael Petraglia of the University of Oxford suggested that some humans may have survived the hypothesized catastrophe on the Indian mainland. Undertaking "Pompeii-like excavations" under the layer of Toba ash, the team discovered tools and human habitations from both before and after the eruption. However, human fossils have not been found from this period, and nothing is known of the ethnicity of these early humans in India. Recent research also by Macauly et al. (2005) and Posth et al. (2016), also argue for a post-Toba dispersal. Early Stone Age hominin fossils have been found in the Narmada valley of Madhya Pradesh. Some have been dated to 200- 700,000 BP. It is uncertain what species they represent.

==== Post-Toba Southern Coastal dispersal ====
Map of the peopling of the world by early humans during the Upper Paleolithic.

By some 70-50,000 years ago, only a small group, possibly as few as 150 to 1,000 people, crossed the Red Sea. The group that crossed the Red Sea travelled along the coastal route around the coast of Arabia and Persia until reaching India, which appears to be the first major settling point. Geneticist Spencer Wells says that the early travellers followed the southern coastline of Asia, crossed about 250 kilometres (155 mi) of sea, and colonized Australia by around 50,000 years ago. The Aborigines of Australia, Wells says, are the descendants of the first wave of migrations.

The oldest definitively identified Homo sapiens fossils yet found in South Asia are Balangoda Man. Named for the location in Sri Lanka where they were discovered, they are at least 28,000 years old.

Theories around Indigenous Aryanism are popular among certain Hindutva circles, and do not have any support in peer-reviewed literature.

=== AASI ===
Narasimhan et al. (2018) introduced the term AASI, "Ancient Ancestral South Indian" (Note: ASI was synonymous to AASI before 2018.) (AASI) for these oldest human inhabitants, which were possibly distantly related to the common ancestors of East-Eurasians such as Andaman Islanders (such as the Onge), East Asians, and Australian Aboriginals. According to Narasimhan et al. (2019), "essentially all the ancestry of present-day eastern and southern Asians (prior to West Eurasian-related admixture in southern Asians) derives from a hypothetical single eastward spread, which gave rise in a short span of time to the lineages leading to AASI, East Asians, Onge, and Australians.", a lineage often referred to as "East-Eurasians".

==== Relation to Andaman Islanders ====
Several genetic studies have found evidence of a distant common ancestry between native Andaman Islanders and the AASI/ASI ancestral component found in South Asians. Modern South Asians have not been found to carry the paternal lineages common in the Andamanese, which has been suggested to indicate that certain paternal lineages may have become extinct in India, or that they may be very rare and have not yet been sampled. Chaubey and Endicott (2013) further noted that "Overall, the Andamanese are more closely related to Southeast Asian Negritos than they are to present-day South Asians." (Note: Chaubey and Endicott (2013): "these estimates suggest that the Andamans were settled less than ~26 ka and that differentiation between the ancestors of the Onge and Great Andamanese commenced in the Terminal Pleistocene." (p.167); "In conclusion, we find no support for the settlement of the Andaman Islands by a population descending from the initial out-of-Africa migration of humans, or their immediate descendants in South Asia. It is clear that, overall, the Onge are more closely related to Southeast Asians than they are to present-day South Asians." (p.167))

Shinde et al. 2019 found either Andamanese or East Siberian hunter-gatherers fit as proxy for AASI "due to shared ancestry deeply in time." According to Yelmen et al. (2019) the native South Asian genetic component (AASI) is distinct from the Andamanese and not closely related, and that the Andamanese are thus an imperfect and imprecise proxy for AASI. According to Yelmen et al, the Andamanese component (represented by the Andamanese Onge) was not detected in the northern Indian Gujarati, and thus it is suggested that the South Indian tribal Paniya people (who are believed to be of largely AASI ancestry) would serve as a better proxy than the Andamanese (Onge) for the "native South Asian" component in modern South Asians.

According to Narasimhan et al. (2019), the "AASI" component in South Asians shares a common root with the Andamanese (as exemplified by the Onge) and is distantly related to the Onge (Andamanese), as well as to East Asians, and Aboriginal Australians (with those groups and the AASI sharing a deep ancestral split around the same time), which would place them in the East-Eurasian lineage.

==== Relation to "Negritos" ====
The present-day Andamese are considered to be part of the "Negritos", several diverse ethnic groups who inhabit isolated parts of southeast Asia. Based on their physical similarities, Negritos were once considered a single population of related people, but the appropriateness of using the label 'Negrito' to bundle together peoples of different ethnicity based on similarities in stature and complexion has been challenged. Recent research suggests that the Negritos include several separate groups, as well as demonstrating that they are not closely related to the Pygmies of Africa.

According to Vishwanathan et al. (2004), the typical "negrito" features could also have been developed by convergent evolution. According to Gyaneshwer Chaubey and Endicott (2013), "At the current level of genetic resolution, however, there is no evidence of a single ancestral population for the different groups traditionally defined as 'negritos'." Basu et al. 2016 concluded that the Andamanese have a distinct ancestry and are not closely related to other South Asians, but are closer to Southeast Asian Negritos, indicating that South Asian peoples do not descend directly from "Negritos" as such.

=== Sri Lankan Vedda ===
Groups ancestral to the modern Veddas were probably the earliest inhabitants of Sri Lanka. Their arrival is dated tentatively to about 40,000–35,000 years ago. They are genetically distinguishable from the other peoples of Sri Lanka, and they show a high degree of intra-group diversity. This is consistent with a long history of existing as small subgroups undergoing significant genetic drift.

A 2013 study by Raghavan et al. showed that the Vedda are closely related to other groups in Sri Lanka and India, especially to Sinhalese and Tamils. They additionally found deep relations between the indigenous Vedda and other South Asian populations with the modern populations of Europe, the Middle East and Northern Africa.

== Latest Glacial Maximum ==
After the Last Glacial Period, human populations started to grow and migrate. With the invention of agriculture, the so-called Neolithic revolution, larger numbers of people could be sustained. The use of metals (copper, bronze, iron) further changed human ways of life, giving an initial advance to early users, and aiding further migrations, and admixture.

According to Silva et al. (2017), multiple waves of migration from western Eurasia took place after the last Ice Age, both before and after the advent of farming in South Asia. According to Narasimhan et al. (2019), people related to Iranian hunter-gatherers were present in South Asia before the advent of farming. They mixed with Ancestral Ancient South Asians (AASI) to form the Indus Valley population. With the decline of the IVC after 1900 BCE and the arrival of the Indo-Aryans, IVC-people mixed with incoming Indo-Aryans, forming the Ancestral North Indians (ANI). Other IVC-people mixed with AASI forming the Ancestral South Indians (ASI).

These two ancestral groups mixed in India between 4,200 and 1,900 years ago (2200 BCE – 100 CE), whereafter a shift to endogamy took place, possibly by the enforcement of "social values and norms" during the Hindu Gupta rule. Reich et al. stated that "ANI ancestry ranges from 39–71% in most Indian groups, and is higher in traditionally upper caste and Indo-European speakers".

Basu et al. (2016) note that mainland India harbors two additional distinct ancestral components which have contributed to the gene pools of the Indian subcontinent, (Note: Basu et al. (2016): "By sampling populations, especially the autochthonous tribal populations, which represent the geographical, ethnic, and linguistic diversity of India, we have inferred that at least four distinct ancestral components—not two, as estimated earlier have contributed to the gene pools of extant populations of mainland India.") namely Ancestral Austro-Asiatic (AAA) and Ancestral Tibeto-Burman (ATB).

== Pre-Indo Aryan West Eurasian ancestry ==
=== Pre-farming Iranian hunter-gatherers ===
Narasimhan et al. (2019) and Shinde et al. (2019) conclude that west Eurasian ancestry was already present before the advent of farming in South Asia. (Note: According to Narasimhan et al. (2019) Iranian farmer related people arrived before 6000 BCE in Pakistan and north-west India, before the advent of farming in northern India. They suggest the possibility that this "Iranian farmer–related ancestry [...] was [also] characteristic of northern Caucasus and Iranian plateau hunter-gatherers.")

Metspalu et al. (2011) detected a genetic component in India, k5, which "distributed across the Indus Valley, Central Asia, and the Caucasus". According to Metspalu et al. (2011), k5 "might represent the genetic vestige of the ANI", though they also note that the geographic cline of this component within India "is very weak, which is unexpected under the ASI-ANI model", explaining that the ASI-ANI model implies an ANI contribution which decreases toward southern India. According to Metspalu et al. (2011), "regardless of where this component was from (the Caucasus, Near East, Indus Valley, or Central Asia), its spread to other regions must have occurred well before our detection limits at 12,500 years."

Speaking to Fountain Ink, Metspalu said, "the West Eurasian component in Indians appears to come from a population that diverged genetically from people actually living in Eurasia, and this separation happened at least 12,500 years ago." (Note: Srinath Perur (December 2013), The origins of Indians. What our genes are telling us., Fountain Ink) (Note: Note that according to Jones et al. (2015), Caucasian Hunter Gatherers and "the ancestors of Neolithic farmers" split circa 25,000 years ago: "Caucasus hunter-gatherers (CHG) belong to a distinct ancient clade that split from western hunter-gatherers ~45 kya, shortly after the expansion of anatomically modern humans into Europe and from the ancestors of Neolithic farmers ~25 kya, around the Last Glacial Maximum. CHG genomes significantly contributed to the Yamnaya steppe herders who migrated into Europe B3,000 BC, supporting a formative Caucasus influence on this important Early Bronze age culture.") Moorjani et al. (2013) refer to Metspalu (2011) (Note: The reference is to a "recent study", and gives Kivisild et al. (1999). Kivisild (1999) does not mention the number 12,500, nor does it explicitly make such a statement. What it does state is that western-Eurasian and Indian mtDNA lineages overlap in haplogroup U; that the split between the western-Eurasian and Indian U2 lineages appeared circa 53,000 ± 4,000 years before present; and that "despite their equally deep time depth, the Indian U2 has not penetrated western Eurasia, and the European U5 has almost not reached India." They further note that wester-Eurasian mtDNA lineages did spread in India at the time of the spread of agricultural crops from the fertile Crescent. Metspalu et al. (2011) do refer to 12,500 years ago. Apparently, the reference to Kivisld (1999) is incorrect, and was not noticed by the authors.) as "fail[ing] to find any evidence for shared ancestry between the ANI and groups in West Eurasia within the past 12,500 years". CCMB researcher Thangaraj believes that "it was much longer ago", and that "the ANI came to India in a second wave of migration (Note: After the initial settlement of India by the ASI.) that happened perhaps 40,000 years ago."

=== Possible migration of Indian Neolithic farmers ===
Map of the world showing approximate centres of origin of agriculture and its spread in prehistory

According to Gallego Romero et al. (2011), their research on lactose tolerance in India suggests that "the west Eurasian genetic contribution identified by Reich et al. (2009) principally reflects gene flow to Iran and the Middle East." Gallego Romero notes that Indians who are lactose-tolerant show a genetic pattern regarding this tolerance which is "characteristic of the common Indian mutation." According to Romero, this suggests that "the most common lactose tolerance mutation made a two-way migration out of the Middle East less than 10,000 years ago. While the mutation spread across Europe, another explorer must have brought the mutation eastward to India – likely traveling along the coast of the Persian Gulf where other pockets of the same mutation have been found."

According to Broushaki et al. (2016), evidence indicates that the Neolithic farmer component forms the main ancestry of many modern South Asians. These Neolithic farmers migrated from the fertile crescent, most likely from a region near the Zagros Mountains in modern day Iran, to South Asia some 10,000 years ago.

Mehrgarh (7000 BCE to c. 2500 BCE), to the west of the Indus River valley, is a precursor of the Indus Valley Civilisation, whose inhabitants migrated into the Indus Valley and became the Indus Valley Civilisation. It is one of the earliest sites with evidence of farming and herding in South Asia. According to Lukacs and Hemphill, while there is a strong continuity between the Neolithic and Chalcolithic (Copper Age) cultures of Mehrgarh, dental evidence shows that the Chalcolithic population did not descend from the neolithic population of Mehrgarh, which "suggests moderate levels of gene flow." They further noted that "the direct lineal descendents of the Neolithic inhabitants of Mehrgarh are to be found to the south and the east of Mehrgarh, in northwestern India and the western edge of the Deccan Plateau", with Neolithic Mehrgarh showing greater affinity with Chalcolithic Inamgaon, south of Mehrgarh, than with Chalcolithic Mehrgarh.

=== Indus Valley Civilisation ===
Shinde et al. (2019) and Narasimhan et al. (2019), analysing remains from the Indus Valley civilisation (of parts of Bronze Age Northwest India and East Pakistan) and "outliers" from surrounding cultures, conclude that the IVC-population was a mixture people related to Iranian herders and AASI:

The only fitting two-way models were mixtures of a group related to herders from the western Zagros mountains of Iran and also to either Andamanese hunter-gatherers or East Siberian hunter-gatherers (the fact that the latter two populations both fit reflects that they have the same phylogenetic relationship to the non-West Eurasian-related component likely due to shared ancestry deeply in time)

According to Shinde et al. (2019) about 50–98% of the IVC-genome came from people related to early Iranian farmers, and from 2–50% of the IVC-genome came from native South Asian hunter-gatherers sharing a common ancestry with the Andamanese. Narasimhan et al. (2019) found the IVC-genome to consist of 45–82% Iranian farmer-related ancestry and 11–50% AASI (Andamanese-related hunter-gatherer) ancestry. Narasimhan et al. (2019) conclude that the Iranian farmer-related ancestry is related to but distinct from Iranian agri-culturalists, lacking the Anatolian farmer-related ancestry which was common in Iranian farmers after 6000 BCE. (Note: Narasimhan et al.: "[One possibility is that] Iranian farmer–related ancestry in this group was characteristic of the Indus Valley hunter-gatherers in the same way as it was characteristic of northern Caucasus and Iranian plateau hunter-gatherers. The presence of such ancestry in hunter-gatherers from Belt and Hotu Caves in northeastern Iran increases the plausibility that this ancestry could have existed in hunter-gatherers farther east." Shinde et al. (2019) note that these Iranian people "had little if any genetic contribution from ... western Iranian farmers or herders"; they split from each other more than 12,000 years ago. See also Razib Kkan, The Day of the Dasa: "it may, in fact, be the case that ANI-like quasi-Iranians occupied northwest South Asia for a long time, and AHG populations hugged the southern and eastern fringes, during the height of the Pleistocene.") Those Iranian farmers-related people may have arrived in India before the advent of farming in northern India, and mixed with people related to Indian hunter-gatherers c. 5400 to 3700 BCE, before the advent of the mature IVC.

The analysed samples of both studies have little to none of the "Steppe ancestry" component associated with later Indo-European migrations into India. The authors found that the respective amounts of those ancestries varied significantly between individuals, and concluded that more samples are needed to get the full picture of Indian population history.

==== Elamite-Dravidian hypothesis ====
While the IVC has been linked to the early Dravidian peoples, some scholars have suggested that their Neolithic farmer predecessors may have migrated from the Zagros Mountains to northern South Asia some 10,000 years ago. According to David McAlpin, the Dravidian languages were brought to India by immigration into India from Elam. Franklin Southworth also states that the Dravidian Languages originated in western Iran and that publications and research are "further evidence of [the relationship between Dravidian languages and Elamite] viability". According to Renfrew and Cavalli-Sforza, proto-Dravidian was brought to India by farmers from the Iranian part of the Fertile Crescent, (Note: Derenko: "The spread of these new technologies has been associated with the dispersal of Dravidian and Indo-European languages in southern Asia. It is hypothesized that the proto-Elamo-Dravidian language, most likely originated in the Elam province in southwestern Iran, spread eastwards with the movement of farmers to the Indus Valley and the Indian sub-continent." Derenko refers to: Renfrew (1987), Archaeology and Language: The Puzzle of Indo-European Origins; Renfrew (1996), Language families and the spread of farming. In: Harris DR, editor, The origins and spread of Agriculture and Pastoralism in Eurasia, pp. 70–92; Cavalli-Sforza, Menozzi, Piazza (1994), The History and Geography of Human Genes.) but more recently Heggerty and Renfrew (2014) noted that "McAlpin's analysis of the language data, and thus his claims, remain far from orthodoxy", adding that Fuller finds no relation of Dravidian language with other languages, and thus assumes it to be native to India. Renfrew and Bahn conclude that several scenarios are compatible with the data, and that "the linguistic jury is still very much out." (Note: The Elamite-hypothesis has drawn attention in the scholarly literature, but has never been fully accepted: According to Mikhail Andronov, Dravidian languages were brought to India at the beginning of the third millennium BCE.; Kivisild et al. (1999) note that "a small fraction of the West Eurasian mtDNA lineages found in Indian populations can be ascribed to a relatively recent admixture" at c. 9,300 ± 3,000 years before present, which coincides with "the arrival to India of cereals domesticated in the Fertile Crescent" and "lends credence to the suggested linguistic connection between the Elamite and Dravidic populations."; According to Palanichamy et al. (2015), "The presence of mtDNA haplogroups (HV14 and U1a) and Y-chromosome haplogroup (L1) in Dravidian populations indicates the spread of the Dravidian language into India from west Asia." According to Krishnamurti, Proto-Dravidian may have been spoken in the Indus civilization, suggesting a "tentative date of Proto-Dravidian around the early part of the third millennium." Krishnamurti further states that South Dravidian I (including pre-Tamil) and South Dravidian II (including Pre-Telugu) split around the eleventh century BCE, with the other major branches splitting off at around the same time.)

== Indo-Aryans ==
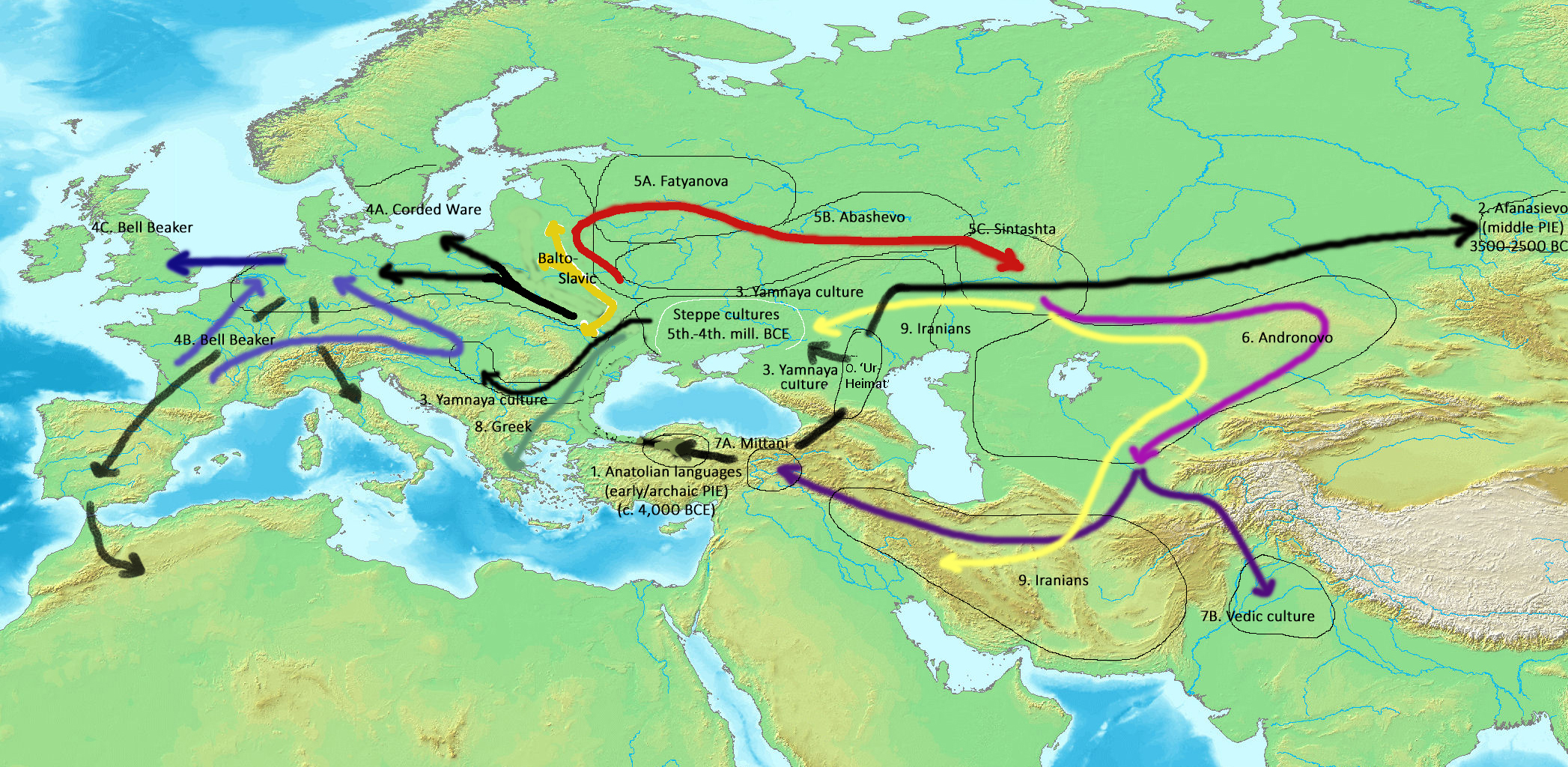
Scheme of the theoretical Indo-European migrations, of which the Indo-Aryan migrations form a part, from c. 4000 to 1000 BCE according to the Kurgan hypothesis.: Pontic–Caspian steppe area corresponds to the assumed Urheimat (Samara culture, Sredny Stog culture) and the subsequent Yamna culture.

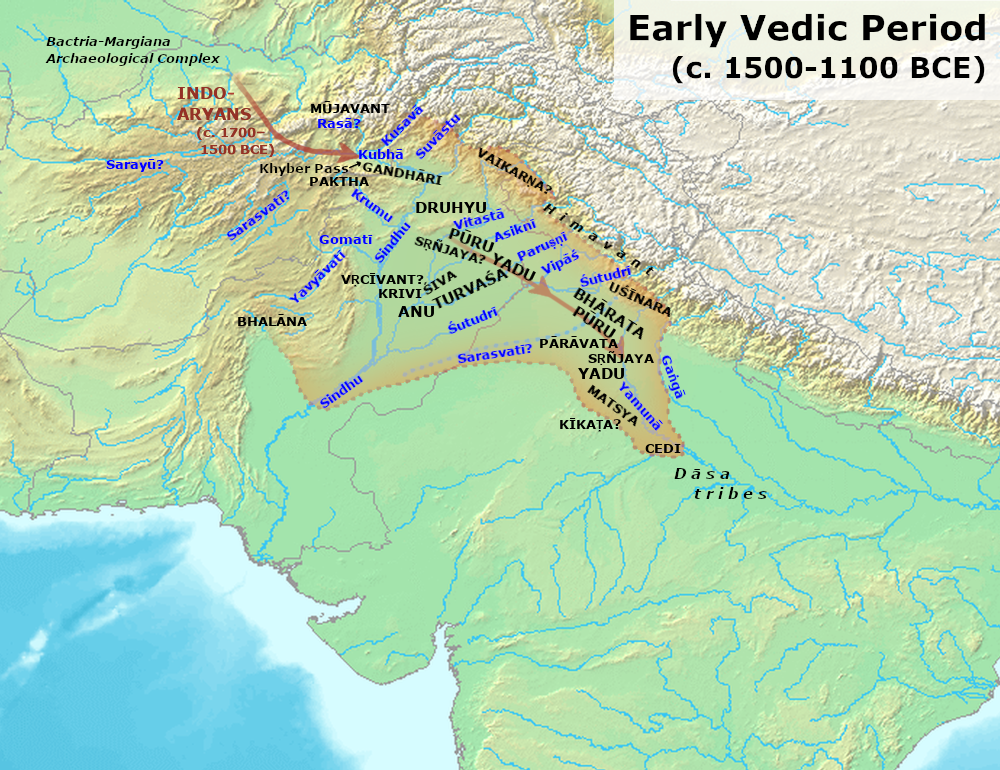
Migration of Arya tribes

In the second millennium BCE people from the Sintashta culture migrated through Bactria-Margiana culture and into the northern Indian subcontinent (modern day India, Pakistan, Bangladesh and Nepal). The Indo-Aryan migrations started in approximately 1,800 BCE, after the invention of the war chariot, and also brought Indo-Aryan languages into the Levant and possibly Inner Asia. (Note: Pathak et al. (2018) concluded that the Indo-Aryan speakers of Gangetic Plains and some Dravidian speakers in central India have significant Yamnaya Early-Middle Bronze Age (Steppe_EMBA) ancestry. The "North-Western Indian and Pakistani" populations (PNWI) showed additionally significant Steppe_MLBA ancestry along with Yamnaya (Steppe_EMBA) ancestry. The study also suggested that the Rors could be used as a proxy for the ANI.)

The Proto-Indo-Iranians, from whom the Indo-Aryans developed, are identified with the Sintashta culture (2100–1800 BCE), and the Andronovo culture, which flourished c. 1800–1400 BCE in the steppes around the Aral sea, in present-day Kazakhstan, Uzbekistan and Turkmenistan. The Proto-Indo-Aryans separated from the Iranians between 1800 and 1600 BCE and moved southward, passing through the area of the Bactria–Margiana Archaeological Complex (BMAC), while assimilating some of the BMAC's distinctive religious beliefs and practices; they subsequently migrated further south, reaching the Levant and northwestern India.

Genetically, Modern Indo-Aryan-speaking populations are descendants of a combination of Western Steppe Herders, Iranian hunter-gatherers, and, to a lesser extent, South Asian hunter-gatherers—commonly known as Ancient Ancestral South Indians (AASI). Steppe Middle and Late Bronze Age (Steppe MLBA) or Sintashta-related ancestry peaks in Northern Europe, particularly among Irish people, Norwegians, Swedes, Belarusians, Lithuanians, Scots and Icelanders. In South Asia, WSH ancestry reaches its highest levels in the northern Indian subcontinent, especially among Brahmin, Bhumihar, Ror, Jat, and Kalash.

== Post-IVC: ANI and ASI ancestral components in the Indian population ==
A series of studies from 2009 to 2019 have shown that the Indian subcontinent harbours two major ancestral components, formed in the 2nd millennium BCE, namely the Ancestral North Indians (ANI), which is closely related to contemporary West-Eurasians, and the Ancestral South Indians (ASI) which is distinct from any outside population. (Note: Basu et al. (2016) discern four major ancestries in mainland India, namely ANI, ASI, Ancestral Austro-Asiatic tribals (AAA) and Ancestral Tibeto-Burman (ATB).) ANI formed out of a mixture of IVC-people and migrants from the steppe, while ASI was formed out of IVC-people who moved south and mixed further with local hunter-gatherers.

These IVC-people did not carry steppe admixture and were instead a mixture of mostly Neolithic Iran-related ancestry and minor AASI (native South Asian hunter-gatherer) ancestry. According to Narasimhan et al. 2019, the genetic makeup of the ASI population consisted of about 73% AASI and about 27% from Iranian-related peoples. This estimate is similar to that of Reich et al., who in 2018 note that the ASI have a West-Eurasian ancestry component (derived from Iranian-related farmers) which Reich estimates at about 25% of their ancestry (not detected in his initial 2009 analysis), with the remaining 75% of the ancestry of the ASI deriving from native South Asian hunter-gatherers.

ANI formed out of a mixture of IVC-people and migrants from Bronze age steppe. Lazaridis et al. (2016) (Note: According to Lazaridis et al. (2016) ANI-related ancestry in South Asians can be modeled as a mix of ancestry related to both early farmers of Iran and to people of the Bronze Age Eurasian steppe (Yamnaya component).) notes that the demographic impact of steppe related populations on South Asia was substantial. According to the results, the Mala, a south Indian Dalit population with minimal Ancestral North Indian (ANI) along the 'Indian Cline' have nevertheless c. 18% steppe-related ancestry, showing the strong influence of ANI ancestry in all populations of India. The Kalash of Pakistan are inferred to have c. 50% steppe-related ancestry, with the rest being of Iranian farmers ancestry. (Note: Lazaridis et al. (2016) Supplementary Information, Table S9.1: "Kalash – 50.2 %, Tiwari Brahmins – 44.1 %, Gujarati (four samples) – 46.1 % to 27.5 %, Pathan – 44.6 %, Burusho – 42.5 %, Sindhi – 37.7 %, Punjabi – 32.6 %, Balochi – 32.4 %, Brahui – 30.2 %, Lodhi – 29.3 %, Bengali – 24.6 %, Vishwabhramin – 20.4 %, Makrani – 19.2 %, Mala – 18.4 %, Kusunda – 8.9 %, Kharia – 6.5 %.") Reich et al. stated that "ANI ancestry ranges from 39–71% in India, and is higher in traditionally upper caste and Indo-Aryan speakers". Compared to other adjoining groups, Ror are the modern population that is closest of the first prehistorical and early historical south Asian ancient samples near the Indus Valley, hence they are considered a realistic proxy for the Ancestral North Indian. The Ror population also harbour similar Steppe-related, AASI, EHG(and Neolithic Anatolian) ancestry, and they show less affinity with the Neolithic Iranians.The Ror population can plausibly be used as an alternative proxy for ANI in future demographic modeling of South Asian Population.

== Austroasiatic ==
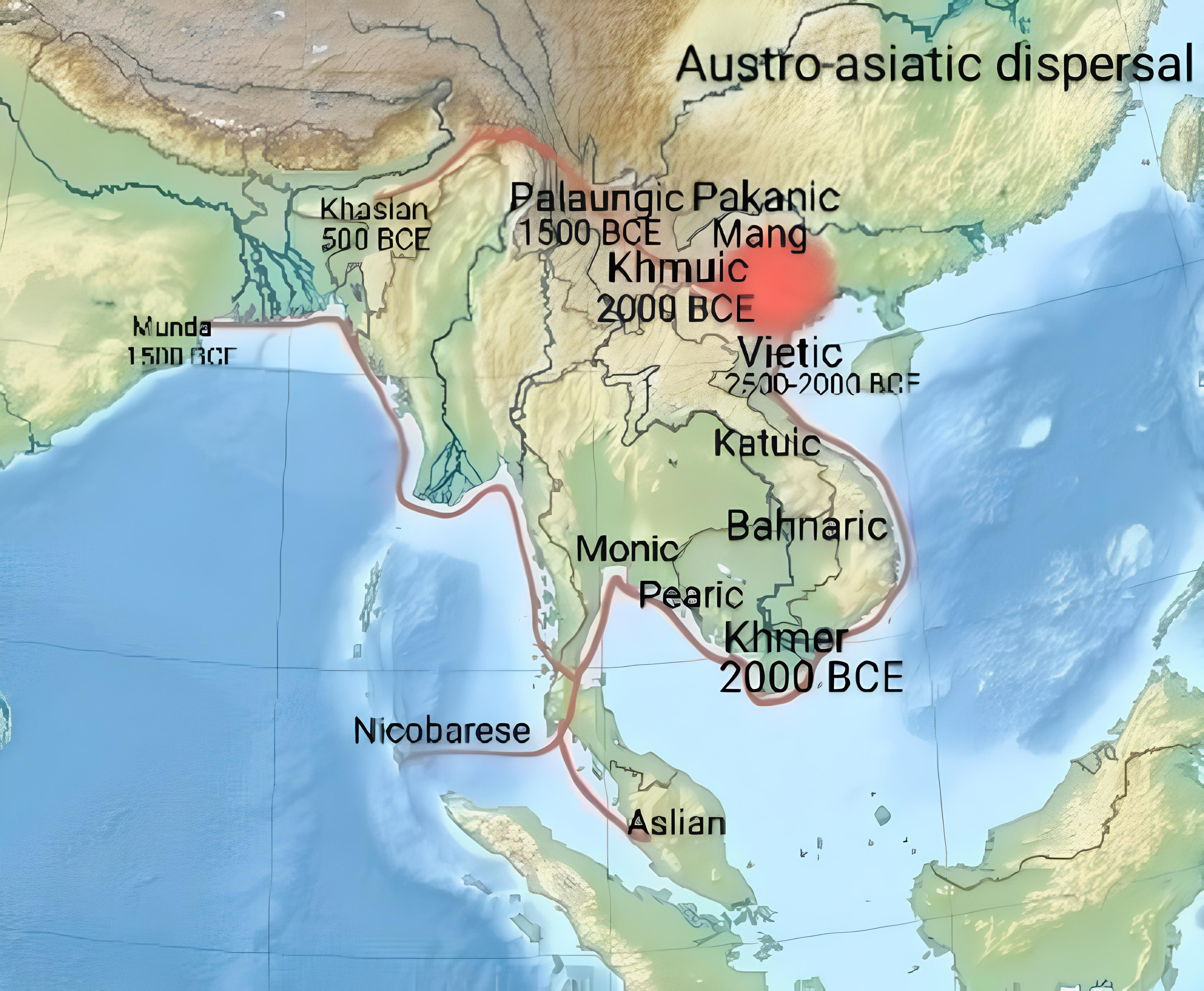
Austro-asiatic dispersal

According to Ness, there are three broad theories on the origins of the Austroasiatic speakers, namely northeastern India, central or southern China, or southeast Asia. Multiple researches indicate that the Austroasiatic populations in Central India are derived from (mostly male dominated) migrations from southeast Asia during the Holocene. (Note: Nevertheless, according to Basu et al. (2016), the AAA were early settlers in India, related to the ASI: "The absence of significant resemblance with any of the neighboring populations is indicative of the ASI and the AAA being early settlers in India, possibly arriving on the "southern exit" wave out of Africa. Differentiation between the ASI and the AAA possibly took place after their arrival in India (ADMIXTURE analysis with K = 3 shows ASI plus AAA to be a single population in SI Appendix, Fig. S2).) According to Van Driem (2007),

the mitochondrial picture indicates that the Munda maternal lineage derives from the earliest human settlers on the Subcontinent, whilst the predominant Y chromosome haplogroup argues for a Southeast Asian paternal homeland for Austroasiatic language communities in India.

According to Chaubey et al. (2011), "AA speakers in India today are derived from dispersal from Southeast Asia, followed by extensive sex-specific admixture with local Indian populations." (Note: See also: "Origin of Indian Austroasiatic speakers". Dienekes Anthropology Blog. 27 October 2010.; Khan R (2010). "Sons of the conquerors: the story of India?". Gene Expression. Archived from the original on 11 April 2016.; Khan R (2013). "Phylogenetics implies Austro-Asiatic are intrusive to India". Gene Expression. Archived from the original on 24 March 2016.) According to Zhang et al. (2015), Austroasiatic (male) migrations from southeast Asia into India took place after the latest Glacial maximum, circa 4000 years ago. According to Arunkumar et al. (2015), Y-chromosomal haplogroup O2a1-M95, which is typical for Austroasiatic speaking peoples, clearly decreases from Laos to east India, with "a serial decrease in expansion time from east to west", namely "5.7 ± 0.3 Kya in Laos, 5.2 ± 0.6 in Northeast India, and 4.3 ± 0.2 in East India". This suggests "a late Neolithic east to west spread of the lineage O2a1-M95 from Laos".

According to Riccio et al. (2011), the Munda people are likely descended from Austroasiatic migrants from southeast Asia. According to Ness, the Khasi probably migrated into India in the first millennium BCE.

According to a genetic research (2015) including linguistic analyses, suggests an East Asian origin for proto-Austroasiatic groups, which first migrated to Southeast Asia and later into India.

== Sino-Tibetan ==
According to Cordaux et al. (2004), the Sino-Tibetan possibly came from the Himalayan and north-eastern borders of the subcontinent within the past 4,200 years.

The ancient people, who lived in the upper-middle Yellow River basin about 10,000 years ago and developed one of the earliest Neolithic cultures in East Asia, were the ancestors of modern Sino-Tibetan populations. (Note: Bing Su (2012): "Furthermore, the extremely high frequency of H8, a haplotype derived from M122C, in the Sino-Tibetan speaking populations in the Himalayas including Tibet and northeast India indicated a strong bottleneck effect that occurred during a westward and then southward migration of the founding population of Tibeto-Burmans. We, therefore, postulate that the ancient people, who livedin the upper-middle Yellow River basin about 10,000 years ago and developed one of the earliest Neolithic cultures in East Asia, were the ancestors of modern Sino-Tibetan populations.") Haplogroup O2-M122 is primarily found among males of Sino-Tibetan ancestry in the Himalayas and Northeast India and which is generally absent among other linguistic families other than Northeast India. O-M134, a subclade of O-M122, has a high percentage, 86.6%, among Tamangs of Nepal, with similar frequencies, ~85%, among the northeastern Indian Tibeto-Burman groups, including Adi, Naga, Apatani, and Nyishi. In Assam, Tibeto-Burman expansion throughout Brahmaputra Valley associated with the patrilinial lineage of O-M134 (Note: BM Reddy (2007): "The presence of O-M134 in high frequency among the Tibeto-Burman populations, both from India and East/southeast Asia, strongly suggests possibility of its correlation with the migration and spread of Tibeto-Burman populations into India.") which occurs at a high frequency of 85% in Kachari (Boro Kachari) peoples and 76.5% in Rabha peoples. (Note: B.M. Das (1987): "Boro Kacharis: The Khacharis which form a Mongoloid tribe, are distributed all over Assam. The tribe has several divisions of which mention may be made of the Boro Kacharis, Dimasas, Sonowals, Thengals and Jahruas. The Dimasas are primarily a hill people and are concentrated in the North Kachar hills. The Sonowals, Jahruas and Thengals are met with in the plains district of Upper Assam. The Kacharis of Lower and Middle Assam are very often referred to as the Boro Kacharis or simply Kacharis." (p.330)) It has a significant presence among the Khasis (29%), despite being generally absent in other Austroasiatics of India, and it shows up at 55% among the neighbouring Garos, a Tibeto-Burmun group.

A wide variety of Sino-Tibetan languages are spoken on the southern slopes of the Himalayas. Sizable groups that have been identified are the West Himalayish languages of Himachal Pradesh and western Nepal, the Tamangic languages of western Nepal, including Tamang with one million speakers, and the Kiranti languages of eastern Nepal. The remaining groups are small, with several isolates.

The Newar language (Nepal Bhasa) of central Nepal has a million speakers and a literature dating from the 12th century, and nearly a million people speak Magaric languages, but the rest have small speech communities. Other isolates and small groups in Nepal are Dura, Raji–Raute, Chepangic and Dhimalish. Lepcha is spoken in an area from eastern Nepal to western Bhutan. Most of the languages of Bhutan are Bodish, but it also has three small isolates, 'Ole ("Black Mountain Monpa"), Lhokpu and Gongduk and a larger community of speakers of Tshangla.

== Crossovers in languages and genetic ancestry ==
One complication in studying various population groups is that genetic and linguistic affiliations in India only are partially correlated, especially in cases where Austric-related peoples have adopted languages from their non-Austric neighbors. For example, while the Oraons have Austric-related ancestry, their language, called Kurukh, is Dravidian. The Bhils and Gonds are frequently classified as "Austric" groups, yet Bhil languages are Indo-European and the Gondi language is Dravidian. On the other hand, the Khasis and the Nicobarese are considered to be a Mongoloid group, and the Mundas and Santals are "Austric" groups, but all four speak Austro-Asiatic languages.

== See also ==
- Genetics and archaeogenetics of South Asia
- Early Indians
- Early human migrations
- Andamanese peoples
- Irulas
- Immigration to India
- Indo-Aryan migrations
- List of R1a frequency by population

== Sources ==
Printed sources

- Andronov MS (2003). A Comparative Grammar of the Dravidian Languages. Otto Harrassowitz Verlag. ISBN 978-3-447-04455-4.
- Anthony DW (2007). The Horse The Wheel And Language. How Bronze-Age Riders From the Eurasian Steppes Shaped The Modern World. Princeton University Press.
- Appenzeller T (2012). "Human migrations: Eastern odyssey. Humans had spread across Asia by 50,000 years ago. Everything else about our original exodus from Africa is up for debate". Nature. 485 (7396).
- Arunkumar G, Wei LH, Kavitha VJ, Syama A, Arun VS, Sathua S, Sahoo R, Balakrishnan R, Riba T, Chakravarthy J, Chaudhury B, et al. (The Genographic Consortium) (2015). "A late Neolithic expansion of Y chromosomal haplogroup O2a1-M95 from east to west". Journal of Systematics and Evolution. 53 (6): 546–560. Bibcode:2015JSyEv..53..546A. doi:10.1111/jse.12147. S2CID 83103649.
- Basu A, Sarkar-Roy N, Majumder PP (February 2016). "Genomic reconstruction of the history of extant populations of India reveals five distinct ancestral components and a complex structure". Proceedings of the National Academy of Sciences of the United States of America. 113 (6): 1594–9. Bibcode:2016PNAS..113.1594B. doi:10.1073/pnas.1513197113. PMC 4760789. PMID 26811443.
- Beckwith CI (16 March 2009). Empires of the Silk Road: A History of Central Eurasia from the Bronze Age to the Present. Princeton University Press. ISBN 978-1-4008-2994-1.
- Bryant E (2001). The Quest for the Origins of Vedic Culture: The Indo-Aryan Migration Debate. Oxford University Press. ISBN 978-0-19-513777-4..
- Cavalli-Sforza LL, Menozzi P, Piazza A (1994). The History and Geography of Human Genes. Princeton University Press.
- Chaubey G, Metspalu M, Choi Y, Mägi R, Romero IG, Soares P, et al. (February 2011). "Population genetic structure in Indian Austroasiatic speakers: the role of landscape barriers and sex-specific admixture". Molecular Biology and Evolution. 28 (2): 1013–24. doi:10.1093/molbev/msq288. PMC 3355372. PMID 20978040.
- Coningham R, Young R (2015). The Archaeology of South Asia: From the Indus to Asoka, c.6500 BCE–200 CE. Cambridge University Press.
- Da Silva; et al. (2017), "A genetic chronology for the Indian Subcontinent points to heavily sex-biased dispersals", BMC Evolutionary Biology, 17 (1) 88, Bibcode:2017BMCEE..17...88S, doi:10.1186/s12862-017-0936-9, PMC 5364613, PMID 28335724
- Das, B.; Walter, H.; Gilbert, Korir; Lindenberg, P.; Malhotra, Kailash; Mukherjee, B.; Deka, R.; Chakraborty, R. (1 December 1987). "Genetic variation of five blood polymorphisms in ten populations of Assam India". Int J Anthropol. 2: 325–340. doi:10.1007/BF02443992. S2CID 83775262.
- Derenko M, Malyarchuk B, Bahmanimehr A, Denisova G, Perkova M, Farjadian S, Yepiskoposyan L (2013). "Complete mitochondrial DNA diversity in Iranians". PLOS ONE. 8 (11) e80673. Bibcode:2013PLoSO...880673D. doi:10.1371/journal.pone.0080673. PMC 3828245. PMID 24244704.
- Haak, Wolfgang; Lazaridis, Iosif; Patterson, Nick; Rohland, Nadin; Mallick, Swapan; Llamas, Bastien; Brandt, Guido; Nordenfelt, Susanne; Harney, Eadaoin; Stewardson, Kristin; et al. (2015). "Massive migration from the steppe was a source for Indo-European languages in Europe". Nature. 522 (7555): 207–211. arXiv:1502.02783. Bibcode:2015Natur.522..207H. doi:10.1038/nature14317. ISSN 1476-4687. PMC 5048219. PMID 25731166.
- Jones, Eppie R. (2016), "Upper Palaeolithic genomes reveal deep roots of modern Eurasians", Nature Communications, 6 8912, Bibcode:2015NatCo...6.8912J, doi:10.1038/ncomms9912, PMC 4660371, PMID 26567969
- Kivisild T, Bamshad MJ, Kaldma K, Metspalu M, Metspalu E, Reidla M, et al. (November 1999). "Deep common ancestry of indian and western-Eurasian mitochondrial DNA lineages". Current Biology. 9 (22): 1331–4. Bibcode:1999CBio....9.1331K. doi:10.1016/s0960-9822(00)80057-3. PMID 10574762. S2CID 2821966.
- Krishnamurti, Bhadriraju (2003). The Dravidian Languages. Cambridge Language Surveys. Cambridge: Cambridge University Press. ISBN 978-0-521-77111-5.
- Kuz'mina EE (2007). J. P. Mallory (ed.). The Origin of the Indo-Iranians. Brill. ISBN 978-90-04-16054-5.
- Lazaridis; et al. (2016). "The genetic structure of the world's first farmers" (PDF). Nature. Supplementary Information. 536 (7617): 419–424. Bibcode:2016Natur.536..419L. doi:10.1038/nature19310. PMC 5003663. PMID 27459054.
- Manickham SK (2009). "Africans in Asia: The Discourse of 'Negritos' in Early Nineteenth-century Southeast Asia". In Hägerdal H (ed.). Responding to the West: Essays on Colonial Domination and Asian Agency. Amsterdam University Press. pp. 69–79. ISBN 978-90-8964-093-2.
- Metspalu M, Romero IG, Yunusbayev B, Chaubey G, Mallick CB, Hudjashov G, et al. (December 2011). "Shared and unique components of human population structure and genome-wide signals of positive selection in South Asia". American Journal of Human Genetics. 89 (6): 731–44. doi:10.1016/j.ajhg.2011.11.010. PMC 3234374. PMID 22152676.
- Moorjani P, Thangaraj K, Patterson N, Lipson M, Loh PR, Govindaraj P, et al. (September 2013). "Genetic evidence for recent population mixture in India". American Journal of Human Genetics. 93 (3): 422–38. doi:10.1016/j.ajhg.2013.07.006. PMC 3769933. PMID 23932107.
- Narasimhan VM, Anthony D, Mallory J, Reich D (2019). "The formation of human populations in South and Central Asia". Science. 365 (6457) eaat7487. Bibcode:2019Sci...365t7487N. bioRxiv 10.1101/292581. doi:10.1126/science.aat7487. PMC 6822619.
- Narasimhan; et al. (2019), "The formation of human populations in South and Central Asia", Science, 365 (6457) eaat7487, Bibcode:2019Sci...365t7487N, doi:10.1126/science.aat7487, PMC 6822619, PMID 31488661
- Ness I (2014). The Global Prehistory of Human Migration.
- Palanichamy MG, Mitra B, Zhang CL, Debnath M, Li GM, Wang HW, et al. (June 2015). "West Eurasian mtDNA lineages in India: an insight into the spread of the Dravidian language and the origins of the caste system". Human Genetics. 134 (6): 637–47. doi:10.1007/s00439-015-1547-4. PMID 25832481. S2CID 14202246.
- Posth C, Renaud G, Mittnik A, Drucker DG, Rougier H, Cupillard C, et al. (March 2016). "Pleistocene Mitochondrial Genomes Suggest a Single Major Dispersal of Non-Africans and a Late Glacial Population Turnover in Europe". Current Biology. 26 (6): 827–33. Bibcode:2016CBio...26..827P. doi:10.1016/j.cub.2016.01.037. hdl:2440/114930. PMID 26853362. S2CID 140098861.
- Qian, Yaping; Qian, Binzhi; Su, Bing; Yu, Jiankun; Ke, Yuehai; Chu, Zhengtao; Shi, Lei; Lu, Daru; Chu, Jiayou; Jin, Li (1 April 2000). "Multiple origins of Tibetan Y chromosomes". Human Genetics. 106 (4): 453–454. doi:10.1007/s004390000259. ISSN 1432-1203. PMID 10830914. S2CID 34487549.
- Reddy, B. M.; Langstieh, B.; Kumar, V.; Nagaraja, T.; Reddy, A.; Meka, A.; Reddy, A. G.; Thangaraj, K.; Singh, L. (2007). "Austro-Asiatic Tribes of Northeast India Provide Hitherto Missing Genetic Link between South and Southeast Asia". PLOS ONE. 2 (11) e1141. Bibcode:2007PLoSO...2.1141R. doi:10.1371/journal.pone.0001141. PMC 2065843. PMID 17989774. S2CID 11759450.
- Ruhlen M (1991). A Guide to the World's Languages: Classification. Stanford University Press. ISBN 978-0-8047-1894-3.
- Parpola A (2010). "A Dravidian solution to the Indus script problem" (PDF). World Classical Tamil Conference. Archived from the original (PDF) on 4 July 2010.
- Parpola A (2015). The Roots of Hinduism. The Early Arians and the Indus Civilization. Oxford University Press.
- Reich D, Thangaraj K, Patterson N, Price AL, Singh L (September 2009). "Reconstructing Indian population history" (PDF). Nature. 461 (7263): 489–94. Bibcode:2009Natur.461..489R. doi:10.1038/nature08365. PMC 2842210. PMID 19779445.
- Shi, H.; Dong, Yong-li; Wen, B.; Xiao, C.; Underhill, P.; Shen, P.; Chakraborty, R.; Jin, Li; Su, B. (2005). "Y-chromosome evidence of southern origin of the East Asian-specific haplogroup O3-M122". American Journal of Human Genetics. 77 (3): 408–419. Bibcode:2005AmJHG..77..408S. doi:10.1086/444436. PMC 1226206. PMID 16080116. S2CID 45130020.
- Shinde; et al. (2019), "An Ancient Harappan Genome Lacks Ancestry from Steppe Pastoralists or Iranian Farmers", Cell, 179 (3): 729–735.e10, doi:10.1016/j.cell.2019.08.048, PMC 6800651, PMID 31495572
- Su, Bing; Xiao, Chunjie; Deka, Ranjan; Seielstad, Mark; Kangwanpong, Daoroong; Xiao, Junhua; Lu, Daru; Underhill, Peter; Cavalli-Sforza, Luca; Chakraborty, Ranajit; Jin, Li (2012). "Y chromosome haplotypes reveal prehistorical migrations to the Himalayas". Human Genetics. 107 (6): 582–590. doi:10.1007/s004390000406. PMID 11153912. S2CID 36788262.
- Truschke, Audrey (15 December 2020). "Hindutva's Dangerous Rewriting of History". South Asia Multidisciplinary Academic Journal (24/25). doi:10.4000/samaj.6636. ISSN 1960-6060.
- Van Driem GL (2007). "South Asia and the Middle East". In Moseley C (ed.). Encyclopedia of the World's Endangered Languages. Routledge. pp. 283–347. ISBN 978-0-7007-1197-0.
- Van Driem GL (2007b). "Austroasiatic phylogeny and the Austroasiatic homeland in light of recent population genetic studies" (PDF). Archived from the original on 3 March 2016.
- Van Driem GL (2011). "Tibeto-Burman subgroups and historical grammar". Himalayan Linguistics Journal. 10 (1): 31–39. Archived from the original on 12 January 2012.
- Vishwanathan H, Deepa E, Cordaux R, Stoneking M, Usha Rani MV, Majumder PP (March 2004). "Genetic structure and affinities among tribal populations of southern India: a study of 24 autosomal DNA markers" (PDF). Annals of Human Genetics. 68 (Pt 2): 128–38. doi:10.1046/j.1529-8817.2003.00083.x. PMID 15008792. S2CID 24230856.
- Wells S (2002). The Journey of Man: A Genetic Odyssey. Princeton University Press. ISBN 978-0-691-11532-0.
- * Wells S (2012). The Journey of Man: A Genetic Odyssey. Random House Publishing Group. ISBN 978-0-691-11532-0.
- Witzel M (2005). "Indocentrism". In Bryant E, Patton LL (eds.). TheE Indo-Aryan Controversy. Evidence and inference in Indian history. Routledge.
- Zhang X, Liao S, Qi X, Liu J, Kampuansai J, Zhang H, et al. (October 2015). "Y-chromosome diversity suggests southern origin and Paleolithic backwave migration of Austro-Asiatic speakers from eastern Asia to the Indian subcontinent". Scientific Reports. 5 15486. Bibcode:2015NatSR...515486Z. doi:10.1038/srep15486. PMC 4611482. PMID 26482917.

Web-sources
