= Chepangic languages =

Sino-Tibetan subfamily of central Nepal

Chepangic
- Geographic distribution: Nepal
- Linguistic classification: Sino-Tibetan: (Tibeto-Burman); Greater Magaric; Chepangic
- Subdivisions: Chepang; Bujhyal

Language codes
- Glottolog: chep1244

The Chepangic languages, Chepang and Bhujel, are Sino-Tibetan languages of uncertain affiliation spoken in Nepal. They are often classified as part of the Mahakiranti or Magaric families (van Driem 2001).

Until recently, the Chepang people were hunter-gatherers.

== Classification ==
Schorer (2016:293) classifies Chepangic as part of his newly proposed Greater Magaric group.

Greater Magaric

- Proto-Dura
  - Dura
  - Tandrange
- Magaric: Kham, Magar
- Chepangic-Raji
  - Chepangic: Chepang, Bhujel
  - Raji-Raute: Raji, Raute, Rawat
