= Greater Magaric languages =

Proposed branch of Sino-Tibetan spoken in Nepal

Greater Magaric
- Geographic distribution: Nepal
- Linguistic classification: Sino-Tibetan: Greater Magaric
- Subdivisions: Dura; Magaric; Chepangic; Raji-Raute

Language codes
- Glottolog: kham1285

The Greater Magaric languages are a branch of Sino-Tibetan languages proposed by Nicolas Schorer (2016). Schorer (2016: 286-287) considers Greater Magaric to be closely related to the Kiranti languages as part of a greater Himalayish branch, and does not consider Himalayish to be particularly closely related to the Tibetic languages, which include Tibetan and the Tamangic languages.

Matisoff (2015: xxxii, 1123-1127), in the final print release of the Sino-Tibetan Etymological Dictionary and Thesaurus (STEDT), has also proposed a Kham-Magar-Chepang language group.

== Classification ==
Schorer (2016:293) classifies the Greater Magaric languages as follows.

- Greater Magaric
  - Dura
    - Dura
    - Tandrange
  - Magaric
    - Kham
    - Magar
  - Chepangic-Raji
    - Chepangic
      - Chepang
      - Bhujel
    - Raji-Raute
      - Raji
      - Raute
      - Rawat
