= Magaric languages =

Proposed Sino-Tibetan subfamily of Nepal

Magar
- Geographic distribution: Nepal, India
- Linguistic classification: Sino-Tibetan: Greater Magaric; Magar
- Subdivisions: Magar; Kham

Language codes
- Glottolog: None

The Magar languages (or Magaric languages) are a small proposed family of Sino-Tibetan languages spoken in Nepal and India, notably including Magar and Kham. (Ethnologue considers each to be a cluster of languages.) They are often classified as part of the Mahakiranti family, and Van Driem (2001) proposes that they are close relatives of Mahakiranti.

Several neighboring languages with uncertain affiliation may prove to belong to a larger Magar family ("Greater Magaric"). These are Chepangic, and possibly also Raji–Raute and Dura languages.

Thurgood & LaPolla (2003) included Kham in LaPolla's speculative 'Rung' proposal, but found the inclusion of Magar and Chepang less probable, suggesting that the evidence for even a Magar–Kham connection is far from clear-cut.

The Kaike language is also spoken by the Magar people, but is a Tamangic rather than a Magaric language.

== Classification ==
Schorer (2016:293) classifies Magaric as part of his newly proposed Greater Magaric group.

- Greater Magaric
  - Proto-Dura
    - Dura
    - Tandrange
  - Magaric: Kham, Magar
  - Chepangic-Raji
    - Chepangic: Chepang, Bhujel
    - Raji-Raute: Raji, Raute, Rawat

== Bibliography ==
- George van Driem (2001) Languages of the Himalayas: An Ethnolinguistic Handbook of the Greater Himalayan Region. Brill.
- Thurgood, Graham (2003) "A subgrouping of the Sino-Tibetan languages: The interaction between language contact, change, and inheritance." In G. Thurgood and R. LaPolla, eds., The Sino-Tibetan languages, pp 14–17. London: Routledge.
