= Raji people =

Ethnic group in India and Nepal

Raji
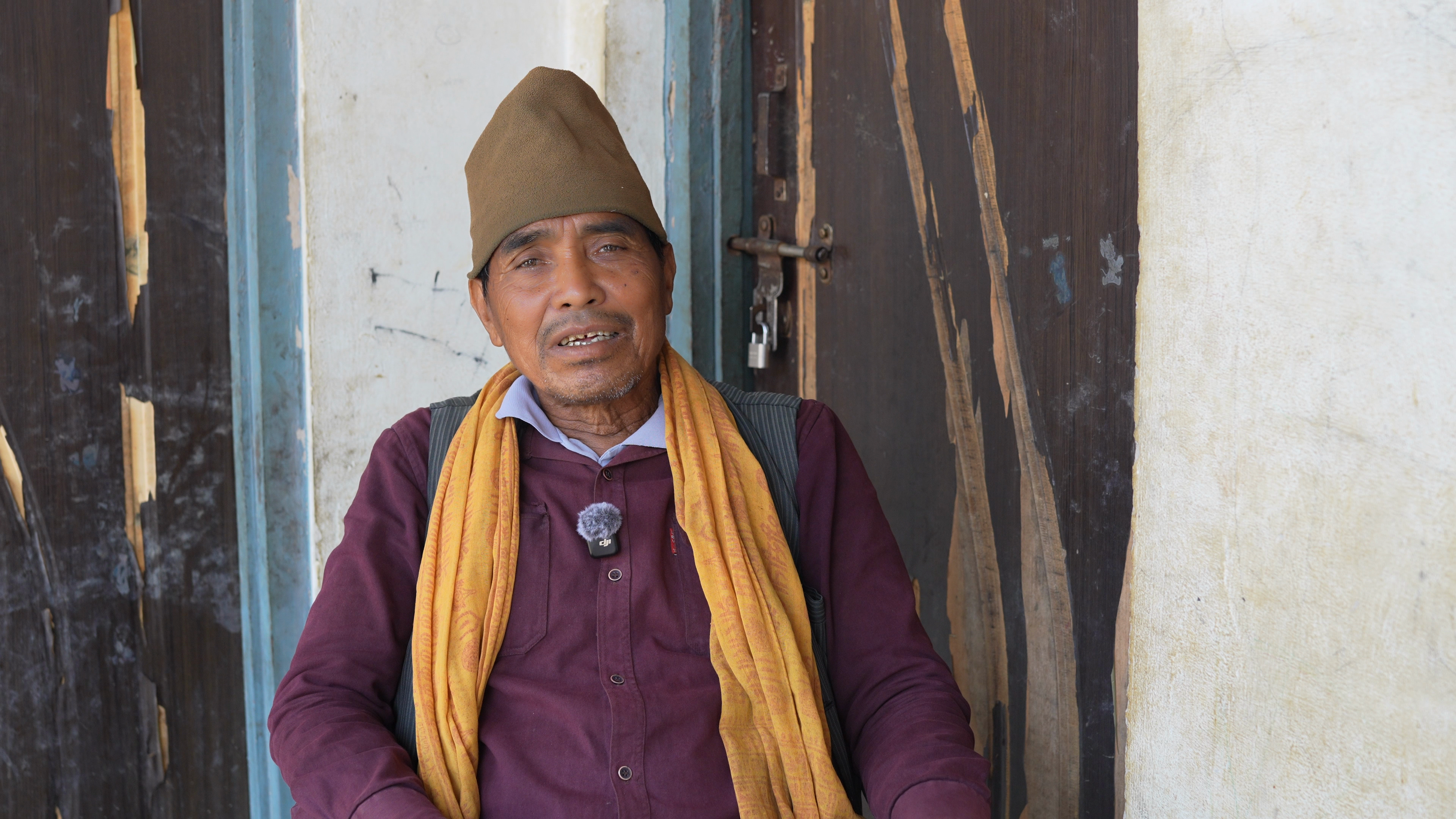
- Raji elder Kaliprasad Raji in 2026

Regions with significant populations
- Nepal

Languages
- Raji language

The Raji people are a community found in Uttarakhand, India and some parts of western Nepal. As of 2001, the Raji people are classified as a Scheduled Tribe under the Indian government's reservation program of positive discrimination. The Raji speak their native, Raji, language.

They call themselves Bot Tho while others also call them Forest Raji (Ban Raji), and Forest Rawat (Ban Rawat). They traditionally hunt for a living, especially porcupine and bats, and dig wild yams (Dioscorea spp) and other forest foods. Some families have a trade agreement with local traders (Bhotiya) to sell their handmade wooden bowls while others have branched out into carpentry, selling other woodenwares such as plowshares and house building planks.

Raji women have also been employed as rock crushers for construction projects. Households who were forcibly settled by the Government of India in the last generation mostly have subsistence-size garden plots and a few cattle as well.

== Language ==
A native Raji speaker introducing himself and discussing the every day use of his language in 2026

Raji speak Raji, Tibeto-Burman language which they call Bat-Kha among communities in the Pithoragarh region and Bot-Kha in the Champawat region of Uttarakhand. It is classified by linguists as Rawat (ISO 639-3 jnl; Glottocode Rawa1264). It is in the same language sub-group with the languages named Raji spoken in Nepal (ISO 639-3 rji; Glottocode Raji1240) and Raute (ISO 639-3 rau; Glottocode Raut1239) which is also spoken in Nepal. The three languages are currently classified in their own Sino-Tibetan language sub-group called Raji-Raute. This language sub-group shows some affinity to areal Mahakiranti group Himalayish languages such as Kham Magar and Dhut Magar.

== Raji people in Nepal ==
The Central Bureau of Statistics of Nepal classifies the Raji as a subgroup within the broader social group of Mountain/Hill Janajati. At the time of the 2011 Nepal census, 4,235 people (0.0% of the population of Nepal) were Raji. The frequency of Raji people by province was as follows:

- Karnali Province (0.1%)
- Sudurpashchim Province (0.1%)

The frequency of Raji people in Nepal was higher than the national average (0.0%) in the following districts:

- Kailali (0.3%)
- Surkhet (0.3%)
- Bardiya (0.2%)
- Jajarkot (0.1%)
