= Tandrang =

Tandrang may refer to:

- Tandrang, Gorkha, Nepal
- Tandrang, Lamjung, Nepal

== See also ==
- Tandrange language, Sino-Tibetan language spoken in Nepal
