= Raute =

Raute may refer to:

- Raute people, of Nepal
- Raute language, their Sino-Tibetan language
- Raji–Raute languages, Sino-Tibetan language subgroup of western Nepal and Uttarakhand, India
- Raute (company)
