= Rawat language =

Sino-Tibetan language spoken in India

Rawat
- Native to: India
- Region: Uttarakhand
- Ethnicity: Banrawats
- Native speakers: (670 cited 1998)
- Language family: Sino-Tibetan: Raji–Raute; Raute–Rawat; Rawat

Language codes
- ISO 639-3: jnl
- Glottolog: rawa1264

Rawat (Raute), or "Jangali" (Jungle), is a small Sino-Tibetan language of India. It is spoken in 9 villages north of Askot in Pithoragarh district, Uttarakhand, India (Ethnologue) as well as in several villages in Dadeldhura District, Nepal and Darchula District, Nepal.

Rawat (pronounced "raut") is a semi-agglutinative language, and features SOV sentences with either monosyllabic or less frequently di-syllabic noun heads and verb stems. Verbs are modified with various particles, including nominalizers, causatives, tense, aspect, person, number and other generally stem final particles. The noun heads have plurals, locatives, deictics, ergatives, reflexives and other generally word-final case markings. Prefixed morphemes similar to adjectives also modify nouns and root-initial voiced/voiceless alternations signal the transitivity of verbs. An example is geda hluw hwã-ha-re (geda=child hluw=bathe hwã=Copula ha=progressive re=present tense) "The child is bathing" (Fortier 2019:139).

Ethnologue (2013) reports that Rawat has borrowed recent loanwords from local Indo-Aryan languages for terms for modern semantic domains (modern house types for example). The exonyms "Rawat", "Raute", and "Raji" all may derive from Indic words referring to "Kings (of the forest)". The people's endonym, name for themselves, is Bat-Tou (in Pithoragarh, India) and Bot-Tho (in Champawat, India) and Bot-Tou (in Dadeldhura, Nepal).

The language Rawat is called Bat-Kha among communities in the Pithoragarh region and Bot-Kha in the Champawat region of Uttarakhand. It is classified by linguists as Rawat (ISO 639-3 jnl; Glottocode Rawa1264). It is in the same Raji-Raute language sub-group with the Nepalese languages, Raji (ISO 639-3 rji; Glottocode Raji1240) and Raute (ISO 639-3 rau; Glottocode Raut1239). This language sub-group shows some affinity to areal Mahakiranti group Himalayish languages such as Kham Magar and Magar Dhut.
