= Mahakiranti languages =

Proposed Sino-Tibetan branch of Nepal and India

Mahakiranti
- Greater Kiranti; Bahing–Vahu
- (retracted)
- Geographic distribution: Nepal and India (Sikkim, Darjeeling and Kalimpong)
- Linguistic classification: Sino-Tibetan: Mahakiranti
- Subdivisions: Kiranti; Newaric; ? Magaric; ? Chepangic

Language codes
- Glottolog: maha1306

The Mahakiranti or Maha-Kiranti ('Greater Kiranti') languages were a proposed intermediate level of classification of the Sino-Tibetan languages, consisting of the Kiranti languages and neighbouring languages thought to be closely related to them. Researchers disagreed on which languages belong in Mahakiranti, or even whether Mahakiranti was a valid group. The group was originally proposed by George van Driem, who retracted his proposal in 2004 after a field study in Bhutan.

== Conceptions of Mahakiranti ==
van Driem (2001) posits that the Mahakiranti languages besides Kiranti proper are Newar, Baram, and Thangmi. Baram and Thangmi are clearly related, but it is not yet clear if the similarities they share with Newar demonstrate a 'Para-Kiranti' family, as van Driem suggests, or if they are borrowings. He sees Lepcha, Lhokpu, and the Magaric languages (in the narrow sense, whether or not Chepangic proves to be Magar) as the Bodic languages closest to Mahakiranti.

van Driem's conception of Mahakiranti

- Mahakiranti
  - Kiranti
  - Newaric (Parakiranti)
    - Newar
      - Baram
      - Thangmi

Matisoff's Mahakiranti includes the Newar and the Magaric languages along with Kiranti. He groups Mahakiranti with the Tibeto-Kanauri languages (in which he includes Lepcha) as Himalayish.

Bradley (1997) adds Magar and Chepang to van Driem's Mahakiranti and calls the result Himalayan. This, along with his "Bodish" (equivalent to Tibeto-Kanauri), constitutes his Bodic family.

Ethnologue (15th ed.) posits Magaric, Chepang, and Newar alongside Kiranti; Mahakiranti is in turn posited to be related to Tibeto-Kanauri in a Himalayish branch, largely equivalent to other scholars' Bodic.

Benedict (1972) included Newar and Chepangic, but not Magaric. He mistakenly classified Vayu as Chepangic and thus named the family Bahing–Vayu.

== Retraction of the hypothesis by van Driem ==
After a field visit to Bhutan, van Driem, the original proponent of this hypothesis, collected data on the Gongduk language which made him realize morphological traits common between Kiranti and Newar are not unique to either Kiranti or Newar but a shared retention of a far older trait. He retracted his proposal in 2004.
