= Banrawats =

Ethnic group in India

The Banrawats (alt., Banrajis, Vanrawats, Vanrajis) are a native endangered ethnic minority group, originating and living in Uttarakhand, India. They are distributed in the districts of Pithoragarh, Champawat and Udham Singh Nagar and in a small area confined to Western Nepal. They are the smallest Himalayan tribal group related to a larger ethno-linguistic group of Raji people. They are basically nomadic hunter-gatherers, but also work as agriculture and forest labourers. They are mainly dependent on forests, and also practice shifting cultivation. Their existence is threatened by developmental and wildlife-related projects. They were placed in forced settlements by the Government of India beginning in the 1980s. Many continue to move in semi-nomadic camps, but most are now settled into villages along the Mahakali River area straddling India.

== Deities ==
Van Rawats worship supernatural beings that live in the forests and sky. The Sun, known as Diho, represents their major deity. They also worship a forest deity known as Kaiyu/Qaiyu. She is prayed to before hunting. The deity Masan is prayed to before fishing. Masan is seen as potentially malevolent while Kaiyu is benevolent. When supernaturals live in natural objects, they may be named as well. The Doliya/Dolia, for example, live in some stones.

A third major set of deities are the ancestral deities, known as Sey-da/Seda, a term that possibly derives from the Proto-Tibeto-Burman word for a dead person, *sǝy 'die'. They make one shake and go into an altered state of consciousness. One of the major ancestral deities is known as Samoji. There are many other ancestral deities based upon a particular clan ancestor.

Practising a form of religious syncretism, Ban Rawats also borrow Hindu deities and will alternatively call paternal ancestral deities by the local Hindu terms, Isht, Pichash, and the common local Hindu deity known as Bhaiyar, especially when speaking in front of outsiders.

A fourth set of major supernaturals are the supernatural forces (Hawa/Ha'wa) that live as animate forces, often of the weather. Latiya Bar/Ban (word-final sound is retroflex palatal nasal stop), for example, will cause people to become dumb (from the Kumaoni word for dumbness plus the indigenous term). Other gods of note include Daru/Dharu which comes along the wind; Bujergalog, a deity mentioned by an octogenarian living in one of the settlements near Askot, Pithoragarh.

== See also ==
- Kumauni people
