= Raji–Raute languages =

Sino-Tibetan branch of western Nepal and Uttarakhand, India

Raji–Raute
- Geographic distribution: Nepal, India
- Linguistic classification: Sino-Tibetan: Greater Magaric; Chepangic–Raji; Raji–Raute
- Subdivisions: Raji; Raute–Rawat

Language codes
- Glottolog: raji1239

Raji–Raute is a branch of the Sino-Tibetan language family that includes the three closely related languages, namely Raji, Raute, and Rawat. They are spoken by small hunter-gatherer communities in the Terai region of Nepal and in neighboring Uttarakhand, India.

Like some other Tibeto-Burman languages, Raji–Raute languages have voiceless sonorants.

== Classification ==
Raute and Rawat are closely related; Raji is more distantly related. Fortier classifies the Raji–Raute languages as follows. Note that language varieties that classify within the Rawat subgroup are known by various names; Raute of Dadeldhura/Darchula is taxonomically a Rawat language, and is not to be confused with Raute proper.

Raji–Raute

- Raute–Rawat
  - Raute (nomadic groups)
  - Rawat
    - Rajwar (spoken in Khirdwari)
    - Rawat
      - Rawat (also known as Ban Raji)
      - Raute of Dadeldhura/Darchula
- Raji
  - Naukule
  - Bandale, Purbia

=== Schorer (2016) ===
Schorer (2016:293) classifies Raji–Raute as part of his newly proposed Greater Magaric group.

Greater Magaric

- Dura
  - Dura
  - Tandrange
- Magaric: Kham, Magar
- Chepangic-Raji
  - Chepangic: Chepang, Bhujel
  - Raji-Raute

=== Fortier (2012) ===
A database of 700 words for items from households of Raute and Ban Rawat speakers (Fortier 2012) indicates a largely Sino-Tibetan language ancestry. Deep Root items include 58 words of Sino-Tibetan origin and 7 of Austroasiatic origin. Proto-family items include 281 morphemes of Proto-Tibeto-Burman origin. Meso-root, or subfamily items include 34 words of Proto-Kuki-Chin origin, 23 of Proto-Tani origin, 6 of Proto-Tangkulic origin, and 1 of Northern Chin origin. The database omits most loans of Indo-Aryan origin although 43 items were of Sanskrit origin. Work remains on identifying etymologies of the remaining 247 items in the Raute–Rawat database.

== Distribution ==
Raji-Raute varieties are spoken in the following areas of Nepal and India.

- Dadeldhura/Darchula Raute: Darchula District and Dadeldhura District, Nepal
- Ban Raji/Rawat: Pithoragarh District, Uttarakhand, India
- Khirdwari Rajwar: Champawat District, Uttarakhand, India
- Raute: nomadic, 10 districts of western Nepal
- Bandale Raji: Surkhet District and Kailali District, Nepal
- Naukule Raji: Kailali District, Nepal
- Purbia Raji: Bardia District, Nepal

== Vocabulary ==
The comparative vocabulary lists of Raji and Raute below are from Rastogi & Fortier (2005). Rastogi & Fortier (2005) also provide Purbia Raji and Janggali Raute forms.

=== Swadesh list ===
The following is a 100-word Swadesh list from Rastogi & Fortier (2005).

No.	English gloss	Rawati (Raji)	Khamci (Raute)
1	I	naa	ngaa
2	you, thou	nang	naa, nhhang
3	we	naani jammaa	ngaa, na, nani
4	this	ai	ii
5	that	aiyaa	he
6	who	chuin	'se; tse, nhhamʔ
7	what	hu	hai, hang
8	not	haa	nai, nā (as verb suffix: -re/rai)
9	all	jammaa ~ jammal	mwalyae
10	many	jikkal	bo-kani, bo, buoh
11	one	daa, ga	daa
12	two	nii ~ nhii	nhi
13	big	bai-inaa	ghaare
14	long	lang	
15	small	ʈuhaa, chui-ce	lhhaʔ
16	woman	maʈhialaa	umaakhala, umaa
17	man	manjha	ba, s'ye; s'yela, māukyaa
18	person	manca	mi: mur; murka, mukala
19	fish	boraa	gaah, gap
20	bird	gidhaa	bwaah, buaʔ
21	dog	kuii	kwui
22	louse	sira	shuhroh
23	tree	shiing	s'iu; tsiu, shing
24	seed	biye	
25	leaf	huwaah, huwaa-aa, khuaa	hwaah, waʔ
26	root	jadao	goy, nyuri (wild yams), dz'ra
27	bark	siing khallaw	thaapa, thakpa
28	skin	khallyai	kiri; kriakaa, kirikyae
29	flesh (meat)	sya	s'yaa, yaa, pyaa, s'iu, shiaeʔ
30	blood	khui	s'ui, ks'ap
31	bone	haɖang	haare, haar'm
32	grease		ge; gela
33	egg	anɖaa	bhi; bhibhiya, bhiya
34	horn	sioang	sikk'm
35	tail	pucheraa	muahta, mukyae
36	feather	pakhaa	phakaa, pwohx
37	hair	haamuu	rung
38	head	gaɽaa	garaah, g'rhha
39	ear	ghunaa, hunaa	gunaah
40	eye	mhiike, niike	mikaah; mhiiga
41	nose	shinaa	'sinaah, shinga
42	mouth	khaaber	chyu(re), mu
43	tooth	daaɽo	s'wāah, tshwa
44	tongue	jibaiɽo	laale, muuhm, mhhwOm
45	fingernail	nhiang	leehm, lhhel
46	foot	bhaa, panjaa	bhaah
47	knee	puhai	phukh, gaʈho
48	hand	hakai	aakhaa
49	belly (stomach)	laado	guduu, gudong, photo ('entrails')
50	neck	gardhan	manto, m'nthu, ghaature
51	breast	cucca	susi
52	heart		paatii, mutu
53	liver	mulyaa	kharabdaah, bara
54	drink	tung	jhum, jaaya, hum, ti-I, tì
55	eat	jaako, jale, jaa-aa	jaa; jaaku; jaaya, ka; kaare
56	bite	kai	ka; kaiyaa, k'I
57	see	guhe	bigaap, bighhae
58	hear	huung-ye	guno, gunaare
59	know	dahau	
60	sleep	iishe	s'ii; s'iyaah, she, kwih
61	die	shiiya	s'i; s'iya
62	kill	haate-ko	ath-oh
63	swim	raa pe	kha-buwa, bou-kha-buwa, bowti
64	fly	bo	bwaah (n.?), pharaei (v.?)
65	walk		hwaa-I, khwa
66	come	biir/hi-ir	bi; biye, bi-e, pi-ye
67	lie	jhuʈi-haa-syaa	lat (lie down)
68	sit	khuung yaa	sweh, sweh guni; aysapha, dzuye
69	stand	yeki	phuyo; phayaah, phuyu
70	give	bai-y, baiko	nyaa; bayaa, khaalu
71	say	neko	khaama (to speak); thi-i, shi dhaami
72	sun	diiho	bel, berh, dhāmu
73	moon	dunnaa	jhyunna, bair, berh (not exact terms for moon, not comp.)
74	star	taaraa	tui-tui
75	water	tii, chi	tsi
76	rain	barkhaa	s'gyae, tii-i
77	stone		
78	sand	ballyaa	bolyaa
79	earth	dexa	desha [< Nepali], samsar
80	cloud	diiho	dewaah, dewaʔ
81	smoke		dhukaāh, dhuma
82	fire	bhåoy / mhai	mhe:h, muhèi
83	ash	dhuli	kuhli, duhri, dhulo
84	burn	lung (vi.)	
85	path	yong	yaun-khyaa-nu, yung
86	mountain	biʈʈaa; dhaɽe (peak)	manam (hill); malam, kheɖ'
87	red	ʈulhariyaa	tui, sha
88	green	hariyo / hariya	hwaa (dark green - gagina), kamaiyo, k'm'iu
89	yellow	pero, piilè	byaalo, hwi-byelo, p'rhho
90	white	dhaurya	dhyaulyaa, dhyaurya, dhauɽia, ghouraya
91	black	tuknahaa	tokaanye, namaro
92	night	gaire	gadhir
93	hot	gamma [< IA]	chunu, ghohnohw
94	cold	ʈhanɖa [< IA]	jungha, dzung
95	full	bharata	jimai (filled), bwohb
96	new	nong	niu, nhu; n'u
97	good	nhikah	namar (person), lagalo
98	round	baʈulo	
99	dry	kaarau we (vi.)	karaao
100	name	naam	miĩhga

=== Body parts ===
Rastogi & Fortier (2005) list the following body part terms.

No.	English gloss	Rawati (Raji)	Khamci (Raute)
1	arm	pa:ti [< IA]	arkha:, wa:u
2	belly	la:do (Purbia Raji dang)	1. photo (belly); 2. gudu ~ gudong; (Janggali gudang) (“intestines”?)
3	blood	khui	1. s'ui:; 2. kshap (kshap recorded by C. Bandhu (pers. comm.))
4	breast	cucci	susi
5	ear	ghuna ~ huna	guna:
6	eye	ni:hke	mi:hka
7	finger	aguliya	hubela
8	fingernail	nihang	lem ~ le:hng ~ li:hm
9	foot	bhaa	bhaa
10	hair	haamu ~ hamo ~ ha ngo	[< Nepali]
11	hand	haake (Purbia Raji yak)	a:khaa, la:ku (Janggali ha:kai)
12	head	garaa	garaa
13	hip, buttocks		s'yi-li
14	goiter		kok
15	knee, joint	puhei ~ puhai ~ puher	phuk
16	leg		bhaa
17	lip	autha [< IA]	cyure; cyura
18	mouth	khaaber	1. cyure; 2. mu ~ mu:hm: ~ mum
19	neck	gardhan [< IA] (Purbia Raji tuk)	1. manto; mani; 2. ghaature [< Nepali]
20	nipple, breast		chuchu
21	nose	s'inna	tsinaa ~ sinaa
22	nostrils		dhodo
23	shoulders	kadhang [< IA]	kum [< Nepali]
24	skin	khallyai	kiriki ~ kiliki ~ kikaa
25	teeth, tooth	swaa	swaåh; chuwaa; miu
26	thighs	jangaa	1. kare, 2. bhaa
27	vulva		pi
