= Dhimalish languages =

Sino-Tibetan languages

Dhimalish
- Dhimal–Lhokpu–Toto
- Geographic distribution: India, Nepal
- Linguistic classification: Sino-Tibetan: Tibeto-Burman?; Kiranti?; Dhimalish
- Subdivisions: Dhimal; Lhokpu; Toto

Language codes
- Glottolog: dhim1247
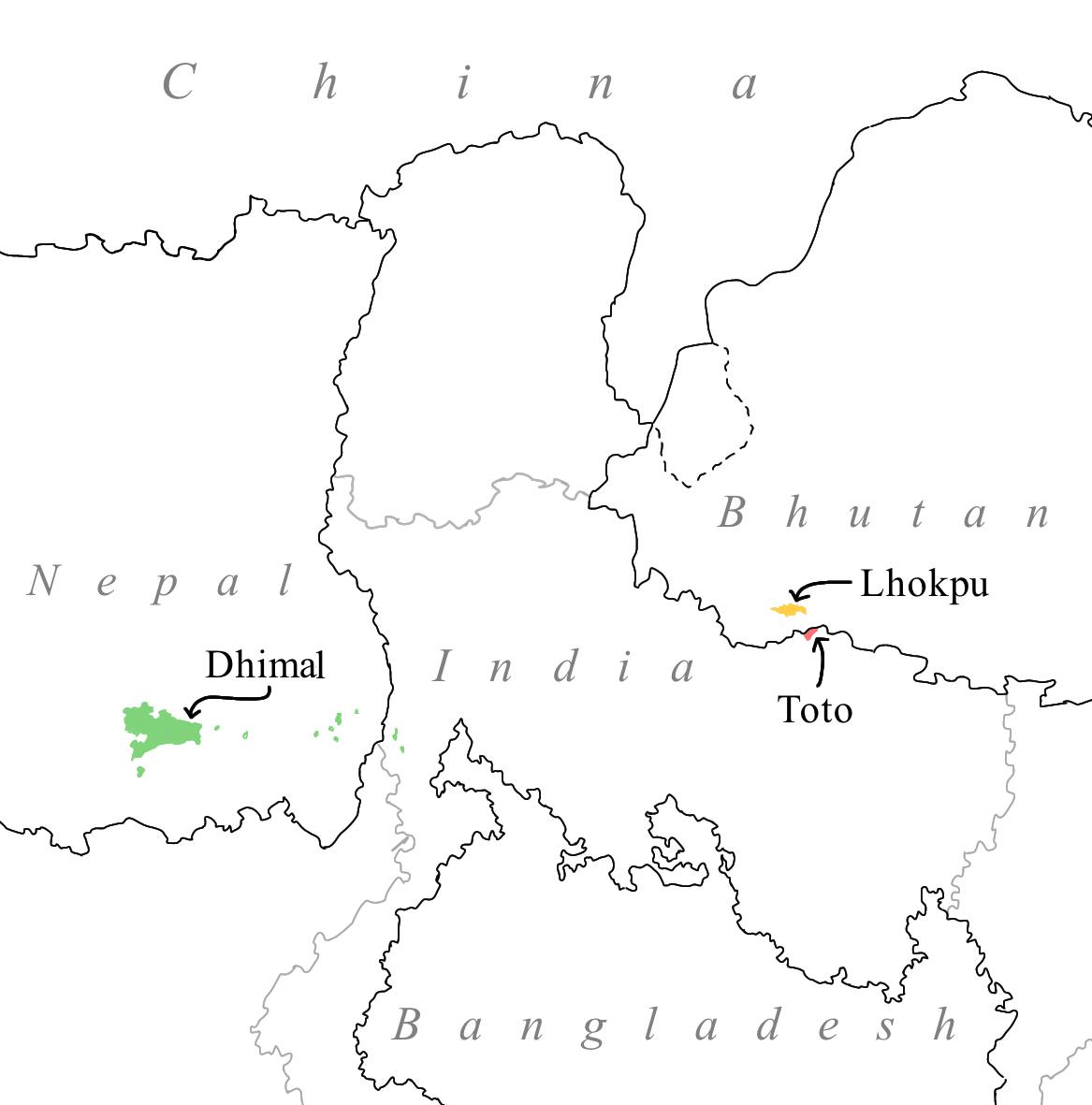
- Map of the Dhimalish languages

The Dhimalish languages, Dhimal and Toto, are a small group of Sino-Tibetan languages spoken in Nepal, Bhutan, and the Jalpaiguri division of West Bengal, India.

== Classification ==
Hammarström, et al. note in Glottolog that Dhimalish is best considered to be a separate Sino-Tibetan branch rather than as a subgroup of Brahmaputran (Sal), and consider Dhimalish as failing to show sufficient Brahmaputran diagnostic vocabulary. Sotrug (2015) considers Dhimalish to be particularly closely related to the Kiranti languages rather than to the Sal languages.

Grollmann & Gerber (2017) consider Lhokpu to have a particularly close relationship with Dhimal and Toto.

Gerber & Grollmann (2018) group Dhimal, Toto, and Lhokpu within Central-Eastern Kiranti.

== Comparative vocabulary ==
Sanyal (1973:77–81) provides a comparative word list of Toto from Sunder (1895) and George Abraham Grierson's Linguistic Survey of India, and Dhimal from Brian Houghton Hodgson.

English gloss	Toto (Sunder)	Toto (Grierson)	Dhimal (Hodgson)	Page no.
air	bingah	–	–	77
ass	–	pangbu	–	77
brother	eh	apu; e	yolla	77
belly	–	pa-ma	hemang	77
back	–	ju-ma	gandi	77
brinjal	bengini	–	–	77
bird	–	bakhi	jiha	77
behind	–	no	–	77
blood	viti	–	–	77
beat	–	sapu	–	77
before	–	dongangta	–	77
bullock	pekah-dambe	–	–	77
cat	minki	minki	dankha-menko	77
cock	odangpa	keka	dhangai-kai	77
come quickly	to-to-wa-wang	le-le	dhi-dhi	77
cow	–	pika	mahani-pia	77
daughter	memi-cheng	chai-me	chamdi	77
devil	–	jishang	–	77
duck	hangsa	hangsa	hangs	77
die	–	sipuna	sili	77
dog	kia	kia	khia	77
down	–	lijuing	–	77
door	lafoong	–	duar	77
eat	–	char	chabi	77
eye	michu	–	mi	77
eyebrow	mimu	–	–	77
elephant	hati	–	–	77
elder sister	anna	–	–	77
evening	jilong	–	–	78
ear	nanoong	–	naha-thong	78
far	–	hinda-mina	–	78
fire	meh	megue	mau	78
forehead	ting-ang	–	–	78
foot	tang-ba	–	kokoi	78
father	appa	apa	aba	78
of father	–	apak	–	78
two fathers	–	apa-nisa	–	78
fish	ngya	–	–	78
fever	haina	–	–	78
good	–	entana	–	78
give	–	picha	–	78
girl	chame	–	–	78
god	–	iswal	–	78
go north	enta-vatu	–	–	78
go east	nuta-vatu	–	–	78
go south	leta-vatu	–	–	78
go west	dita-vatu	–	–	78
go	vatu; hatu	chhapur	hadeli	78
hair	puring	puring	poshom	78
he	–	–	wa	78
he-goat	edang	–	–	78
horse	onyah	aia	–	78
high	–	hinda-nina	–	78
hand	kooe	kui	khur	78
his	uko	–	oko, wang	78
head	pudung	pudang	purin	78
house	–	sa	sa	78
I	kug-ve	kate	ka	78
iron	–	chaka	chir	78
jackfruit	dangse	–	–	79
jungle bamboo	–	–	–	79
lips	megoe	–	–	79
leg	kok-koi	–	khokoi	79
lime	churai	–	–	79
man	–	deya	waved	79
mother	aeu	aio	amma	79
mouth	noohgung	–	–	79
monkey	nokka	–	–	79
milk	yoti	–	–	79
moon	tari	tari	tali	79
morning	habkong	–	–	79
nose	nabboh	–	–	79
nails	kushing	–	–	79
near	–	abeto	–	79
night	lishong	–	–	79
no	–	ma-koe	–	79
orange	santra	–	–	79
our	kongo	–	king	79
pig	pakka	–	–	79
pan leaf	parai	–	–	79
plantain	eungpi	–	–	79
plantain tree	eungpi	–	–	79
paddy	mabe	–	–	79
river	tihana	–	–	79
rain	vathi	–	–	79
rice	unku	–	–	79
rice-beer	eu	–	–	79
run	–	tui	–	79
rupee	tanka	–	–	79
sister	–	ing	rima	79
sun	sani	chhani	bela	79
son	chung	chao, chaoa	chau	79
stand	–	lo-lo	–	79
star	puima	–	–	79
salt	ngi	–	–	80
sit	–	iyung	yongli	80
tiger	koogah	–	–	80
thigh	vybe	–	–	80
thou	–	na-ga	–	80
tree	singe	–	–	80
tooth	shitang	–	sitong	80
tongue	lebek	–	detong	80
up	–	jujuntaye	–	80
water	ti	ti	chi	80
we	–	na-te	kyel	80
woman	–	mem-bi	beval	80
wife	–	me	be	80
who	–	ha	jeti-siti	80
why	–	ha-ranga	haipali	80
younger sister	ing	–	–	80
yes	–	ke	he	80
you	naga	–	nye	80
1	eoo	che	e-long	80
2	nih-hu	ne	gne-long	80
3	soongu	sung	sum-long	80
4	diu	ji	dia-long	80
5	ngyu	nga	na-long	80
6	tuu	tu	tu-long	80
7	niu	dun	nhu-long	80
8	yau	ge, ne	ye-long	80
9	kuu	gu	kuha-long	80
10	thau	chu-tamba	te-long	80
20	chuniso	nisa	e-long-bisha	81
100	nakai	nga-kai	na-long-bisha	81

== See also ==
- Dhimalish comparative vocabulary list (Wiktionary)
