= Tandrang, Lamjung =

Tandrang, Lamjung तान्द्राङ
- Village development committee
- Country: Nepal
- Zone: Gandaki Zone
- District: Lamjung District

Population (1991)
  - Total: 2,293
- Time zone: UTC+5:45 (Nepal Time)

Tandrang, Lamjung is a village development committee in Lamjung District in the Gandaki Zone of northern-central Nepal. At the time of the 1991 Nepal census it had a population of 2293 people living in 453 individual households.

The Tandrange language is spoken in Tandrang village.
