= Raute language =

Sino-Tibetan of Nepal

Raute
- Region: Nepal
- Ethnicity: Raute people
- Native speakers: 460 (2011 census); 25 nomadic Raute (no date) are monolingual
- Language family: Sino-Tibetan: Raji–Raute; Raute–Rawat; Raute

Language codes
- ISO 639-3: rau
- Glottolog: raut1239
- ELP: Raute

Raute is a small Sino-Tibetan language of Dadeldhura District, Sudurpashchim Province, Nepal. Some speakers are nomadic.

Alternate names include Boto boli, Khamchi, Raji, Rajwar, Ra’te, Rautya, Rautye (Ethnologue).

== Geographical distribution ==
Ethnologue lists the following locations for historical and present locations of the Raute.

- Jogbudha and Sirsa VDC's, Dadeldhura District, Sudurpashchim Province: in Karnali and Mahakali (Kali) rivers watershed regions (800 settled)
- Former nomadic camp in Surkhet district, Karnali Province
- Midwest and far west forest regions (about 25 nomads).
