= Raji language =

Sino-Tibetan language of western Nepal and Uttarakhand, India

Raji
- राजी
- A native speaker of Raji introducing himself and discussing the every day use of his language in 2026
- Pronunciation: [ˈraji] (Raji)
- Region: Nepal, India
- Native speakers: 3,800 (2011 census)
- Language family: Sino-Tibetan: Raji–Raute; Raji
- Dialects: Barh Bandale; Naukule; Purbiya

Language codes
- ISO 639-3: rji
- Glottolog: raji1240
- ELP: Raji

Raji is a small Sino-Tibetan language of Nepal and Uttarakhand, India spoken by the Raji people. Speakers were until recently nomadic.

== Distribution ==
Raji is spoken in the following areas of southwestern Nepal:

- Lumbini Province: Banke and Bardiya districts
- Karnali Province: Surkhet
- Sudurpashchim Province: Kailali and Kanchanpur districts

It is also spoken by Raji people of Uttarakhand, India, primarily living in Pithoragarh district.

In Pithoragarh district, Rastogi (2015) reports that Raji is spoken in the hamlets of Kimkhola, Bhogtirua, Ganagaon, Chipaltara, Madanbori, Kutachaurani, Altodi, Jamtadi, Khirdwari and Chakarpur.

== Dialects ==
Khatri (2008) divides Raji into 3 main regional dialects, for which he also provides word lists.

- Barabandale: spoken in Jyotinagar, Katasi, Lalbojhi, Kuti, Bhuruwa, Solta, Khairehi, and Keodi of Kailali District; Sundarpur, Bandevi Sibir, Daiji, Krishanpur and Chela Sibir of Kanchanpur District; and Rajigaun, Galfa, and Babiyachaur of Surkhet District.
- Purbiya: Shankarpur, Machhagadh, Baniyabhar, Rambhapur, Dhakela, Dhadhawar, Sanoshree, Gulariya Municipality and Phanphena of Bardiya District.Also Speak in Chhinchu of Surkhet District.
- Naukule : Spoken in Jhil and Kuchaini of Chaumala, Shankarpur of Masuriya, Jarahi of Sadepani, Dhangaghi Municipality and Manera. All are located within Kailali District.

== Phonology ==
Consonants
		Labial	Alveolar	Retroflex	Palatal	Velar	Glottal
Plosive	plain	p b	t d	ʈ ɖ	tʃ dʒ	k g	
Plosive	aspirated	pʰ bʱ	tʰ dʱ	ʈʰ ɖʱ	tʃʰ dʒʱ	kʰ gʱ	
Fricative			s			x	h
Nasal	plain	m	n	ɳ		ŋ	
Nasal	preaspirated	ʱm	ʱn				
Approximant	plain	w	l	r	j		
Approximant	preaspirated		ʱl	ʱr	ʱj		

Vowels
	Front	Central	Back
High	i ĩ		u ũ
Mid	e ẽ	ə ə̃	o õ
Low	ɛ ɛ̃	a ã	
