= Dura language =

Extinct Sino-Tibetan language of central Nepal

Dura
- दुरा भुँ
- Native to: Nepal
- Ethnicity: 2,160 (2011 census)
- Speakers: L2: 1 (2013)
- Language family: Sino-Tibetan: Greater Magaric; Dura–Tandrange; Dura

Language codes
- ISO 639-3: drq
- Glottolog: dura1244
- Dura is an Extinct language according to the UNESCO Atlas of the World's Languages in Danger

Dura (Dura: दुरा भुँ, romanized: Durā bʰũ) is an extinct language of Nepal. It has been classified in the West Bodish branch of Tibetan languages, though more recent work separates it out as an independent branch of Sino-Tibetan. Many of the Dura have switched to speaking Nepali, and the Dura language has sometimes been thought to be extinct. Some of the people who have switched to Nepali for their daily speech still use Dura for prayer.

The Himalayan Languages Project is working on recording additional knowledge of Dura. Around 1,500 words and 250 sentences in Dura have been recorded. The last known speaker of the language was supposedly the 82-year-old Soma Devi Dura (Soma Maya Dura), although professor Madhav Pokharel claims she did not speak Dura, but rather a Nepali-based "argot". A second-language speaker named Muktinath Ghimire has also been reported.

== Classification ==
Schorer (2016:293) classifies Dura as part of his newly proposed Greater Magaric branch.

== Distribution ==
The ethnic Dura people mostly live in Lamjung District, with some in neighboring Tanahu District of Gandaki Province in central Nepal. They mostly live on farms in the hilly countryside. Different recent census counts have reported the number of Dura people anywhere from 3,397 to 5,676.

Dura villages include:

- बाँग्रे Bāṅgre
- बेसी बाँग्रे Besī Bāṅgre
- बेसी फाँट Besī Phā̃ṫ
- सिन्दुरे Sindure
- धुसेनी Dhusenī
- नस्के Naske (Dura majority)
- नेटा Neṭā
- चन्दि गाउँ Candigāũ
- भाँगु Bhāṅgu
- मालिङ Māliṅ
- आरीकोसे Ārīkose
- ठूलो स्वाँरा Ṭhūlo Svā̃rā (Dura majority)
- खजे गाउँ Khaje Gāũ
- तुर्लुङ Turluṅ (Dura majority)
- तान्द्राङ्कोट Tāndrāṅkoṫ
- Kunchha
- Bhorletar

Other ethnic groups in the Dura region include the Gurung, Brahmins, Chetrīs, Kāmī, and Damāi.

== Tandrange ==
A closely related language variety called Tandrange (Nepali: तानद्राङे Tāndrāṅe; IPA: tandraŋe) is spoken in a few Gurung villages. Tandrange is spoken in the villages of Tāndrāṅ (तान्द्राङ), Pokharī Thok (पोखरी थोक), and Jītā (जीता). However, Tandrange speakers adamantly consider themselves as not related to the stigmatized Dura people.

== Vocabulary ==
Schorer (2016:126-127) provides the following 125-word Swadesh list of Dura.

No.	Gloss	Dura
1.	I (1SG)	ŋi ~ ŋe
2.	you (2SG)	no
3.	we (inclusive)	ŋyāro
4.	this	ī
5.	that	huī
6.	Who?	su
7.	What?	hāde
8.	not	ma-, ta- (prohibitive)
9.	all (of a number)	dhāī
10.	many	bhāī
11.	one	kyau, nām, di-
12.	two	jʰim, ŋe-
13.	big	kātʰe
14.	long	kānu, remo ~ hreŋo
15.	small	ācʰirī
16.	woman (adult)	misā
17.	man (adult)	kalārā, bro
18.	person	bro
19.	fish (n)	ɖisyā, nāh ~ nāhõ ~ nāhũ ~ nāi
20.	bird; chicken	o
21.	dog	nākyu ~ nakyu ~ nakī, koka
22.	louse	syā
23.	tree	kepo ~ kemo
24.	seed (n)	ʈisro, hulu
25.	leaf	lyoī, lho
26.	root	-
27.	bark (of tree)	-
28.	skin	ke
29.	flesh	syo
30.	blood	hāyu
31.	bone	-
32.	grease, fat	duccʰu
33.	egg	odī, onī
34.	horn (of bull etc.)	soglo, sono
35.	tail	-
36.	feather	phya
37.	hair (human)	kra
38.	head	padʰe
39.	ear	naya, muni, rānu
40.	eye	mi
41.	nose	nu
42.	mouth	māsi, sũ
43.	tooth	sa ~ se
44.	tongue	li
45.	nail	se
46.	foot	sepe
47.	knee	-
48.	hand	kuru
49.	belly	kyu
50.	neck	kʰalī, po ~ põ
51.	breasts	nāmlo
52.	heart	māu
53.	liver	ciŋ
54.	to drink	kiu-
55.	to eat	co-
56.	to bite	-
57.	to see	do- ~ dõ-, mātā-
58.	to hear	tās-, tāu-, tānu-
59.	to know	syo-
60.	to sleep	tānu-
61.	to die	si-
62.	to kill	sā-, kāne-, kāde
63.	to swim	-
64.	to fly	ŋyau, hāsu-
65.	to walk	so-
66.	to come	hro
67.	to lie	-
68.	to sit	huni-
69.	to stand	decʰe-
70.	to give	hyo-
71.	to say	cʰi-
72.	sun	mamī
73.	moon	tālā
74.	star	-so (in compound)
75.	water	ti ~ ʈi
76.	rain (n)	ti ~ ʈi
77.	stone	thũ ~ tũ, kāno ~ kānu
78.	sand	-
79.	earth, soil	kācʰo, cʰuu
80.	cloud	-
81.	smoke (n)	ma-kʰu
82.	fire	mi
83.	ash(es)	ma-pʰu
84.	to burn (vi)	bani-
85.	path	lāutʰyo
86.	mountain	lgẽwarapʰa [sic]
87.	red	cʰāblī
88.	green	-
89.	yellow	kẽlo
90.	white	bintʰā
91.	black	keplo
92.	night	yāku
93.	hot	-
94.	cold	cʰiũ
95.	full	ʈʰyāmmay
96.	new	kācʰā
97.	good	cʰyāu- (v), cʰāblī (also ‘red’)
98.	round	burluŋ
99.	dry	-
100.	name	rāmī
101.	he (3SG)	hui
102.	he₂ (3SG)	ŋo ~ no
103.	you (2PL)	nāro(-nī)
104.	they (3PL)	hyāro
105.	three	sām
106.	four	pim
107.	five	kum (<‘hand’)
108.	where?	kālā
109.	when?	komo
110.	how?	kudinī
111.	other	agyu, rijā
112.	few	ācitī
113.	fruit	pokimuni
114.	flower	ŋepʰu ~ nepʰu
115.	grass	cʰĩ
116.	snake	kāuī
117.	worm	kʰātalī
118.	rope	rasarī
119.	river	kloi ~ klou
120.	to warm (vt)	tāle-u
121.	old	ʈe
122.	straight (not curved)	hopay
123.	sharp	mhyā- (v)
124.	wet	tʰo- (v)
125.	happy	kru- (v)

=== Numerals ===
Dura numerals are (Schorer 2016:146-147):

- 0. liŋa
- 1. nām, kyau, di-
- 2. jʰim
- 3. sām
- 4. pim
- 5. kum
- 6. cyām (Indo-Aryan loanword)
- 7. syām (Indo-Aryan loanword)
- 8. him
- 9. tum
- 10. tʰim
- 20. jʰim-tʰī
- 30. sām-tʰī
- 100. tʰiŋganā, kātʰerāgo
- 1,000. jena

=== Reconstruction of Proto-Dura ===
Schorer (2016:286-287) reconstructs the following Proto-Dura words.

- *hāyu ‘blood’
- *cʰiũŋ ‘cold’
- *kim ‘house’
- *ti ‘water’
- *krut ‘hand’
- *kyu ‘stomach’
- *yāku ‘night’
- *mamī ‘sun’
- *lām- ‘path’
- *luŋ ‘stone’
- *daŋ- ‘to see’
- *rā- ‘to come’
- *khāC- ‘to go’
- *yʱā ‘to give’
- *cʰi- ‘to say’

== See also ==
- Dura word list (Wiktionary)
- Schorer, Nicolas. 2016. The Dura Language: Grammar and Phylogeny. Leiden: Brill. https://brill.com/view/title/33670
- Pons, Marie-Caroline. 2021. Review: The Dura language: Grammar and phylogeny. Himalayan Linguistics, 20(1). http://dx.doi.org/10.5070/H920155279
