= Tandrange language =

Sino-Tibetan language spoken in Nepal

Tandrange
- Native to: Nepal
- Region: Lamjung District
- Ethnicity: Gurung
- Native speakers: <1,000 (2016)
- Language family: Sino-Tibetan: Greater Magaric; Dura–Tandrange; Tandrange

Language codes
- ISO 639-3: None (mis)
- Glottolog: None dura1244 Dura

Tandrange (Nepali: तान्द्राङे [tandraŋe]) is a Sino-Tibetan language spoken in a few ethnic Gurung villages of Lamjung District, Nepal. Tandrange is spoken in the villages of Tāndrāṅ (तान्द्राङ), Pokharī Thok (पोखरी थोक), and Jītā (जीता). It belongs to the Greater Magaric branch of the Sino-Tibetan language family.

According to Schorer (2016), the Tandrange language is closely related to the recently extinct Dura language, which was also spoken in Lamjung District. However, Tandrange speakers adamantly consider themselves as not related to the stigmatized Dura people.

== Numerals ==
The Tandrange numerals are:

- kiute 'one'
- nerki 'two'
- serkiu 'three'
- tari 'four'
- tarkiu 'five'
- naski 'six'
- kar 'ten'
