= Sino-Tibetan languages =

Language family native to Asia

Sino-Tibetan
- Trans-Himalayan
- Geographic distribution: Central Asia; East Asia; South Asia; Southeast Asia
- Native speakers: (undated figure of 1.4 billion)
- Linguistic classification: One of the world's primary language families
- Proto-language: Proto-Sino-Tibetan
- Subdivisions: Some 40 well-established subgroups, of which those with the most speakers are: Sinitic (Chinese · Bai); Tibeto-Burman (Lolo-Burmese · Tibetan · Sal · Karenic · Kuki-Chin · Meitei · Tamangic · Tani)

Language codes
- ISO 639-2 / 5: sit
- Glottolog: sino1245
- Linguasphere: 79-
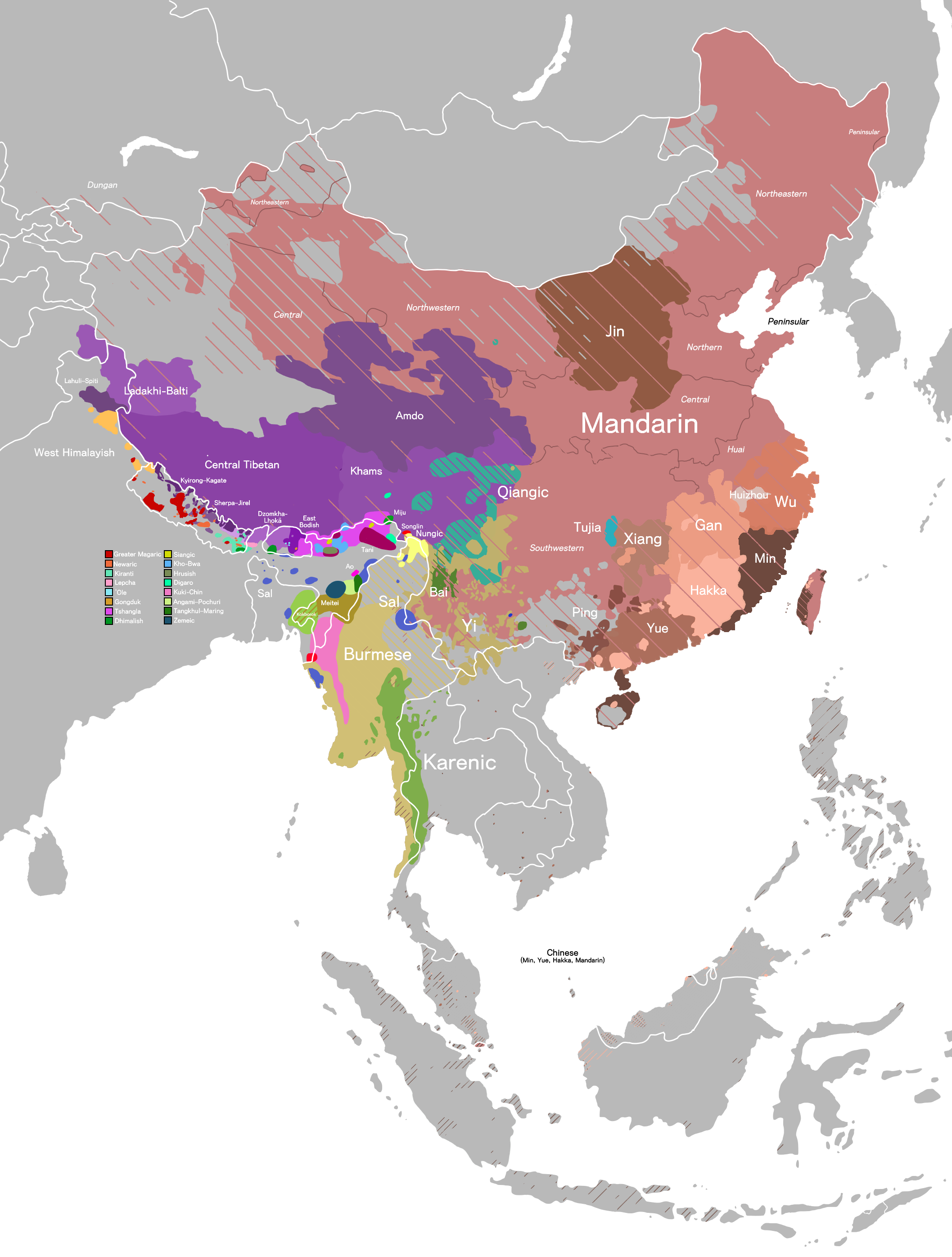
- Groupings of Sino-Tibetan languages

Sino-Tibetan (also referred to as Trans-Himalayan) is a family of more than 400 languages, second only to Indo-European in number of native speakers. Around 1.4 billion people speak a Sino-Tibetan language. The vast majority of these are the 1.3 billion native speakers of Sinitic languages. Other Sino-Tibetan languages with large numbers of speakers include Burmese (33 million) and the Tibetic languages (6 million). Other languages of the family are spoken in the Himalayas, the Southeast Asian Massif, and the eastern edge of the Tibetan Plateau. Most of these have small speech communities in remote mountain areas, and as such are poorly documented.

Several low-level subgroups have been securely reconstructed, but reconstruction of a proto-language for the family as a whole is still at an early stage, so the higher-level structure of Sino-Tibetan remains unclear. Although the family is traditionally presented as divided into Sinitic (i.e. Chinese languages) and Tibeto-Burman branches, a common origin of the non-Sinitic languages has never been demonstrated.

Early classifications included the Kra–Dai and Hmong–Mien languages in the Sino-Tibetan language family. This grouping continues to be supported by Chinese linguists, but has been rejected by the international community since the 1940s, who instead attribute the similarities to sprachbund effects of areal convergence and early borrowing. Several links to other Southeast Asian language families have been proposed, but none have broad acceptance.

== History ==
A genetic relationship between Chinese, Tibetan, Burmese, and other languages was first proposed in the early 19th century and is now broadly accepted. The initial focus on languages of civilizations with long literary traditions has been broadened to include less widely spoken languages, some of which have only recently, or never, been written. However, the reconstruction of the family is much less developed than for families such as Indo-European or Austroasiatic. Difficulties have included the great diversity of the languages, the lack of inflection in many of them, and the effects of language contact. In addition, many of the smaller languages are spoken in mountainous areas that are difficult to reach and are often also sensitive border zones. There is no consensus regarding the date and location of their origin.

=== Early work ===
During the 18th century, several scholars noticed parallels between Tibetan and Burmese, both languages with extensive literary traditions. Early in the following century, Brian Houghton Hodgson and others noted that many non-literary languages of the highlands of northeast India and Southeast Asia were also related to these. The name "Tibeto–Burman" was first applied to this group in 1856 by James Richardson Logan, who added Karen in 1858. The third volume of the Linguistic Survey of India, edited by Sten Konow, was devoted to the Tibeto–Burman languages of British India.

Studies of the "Indo-Chinese" languages of Southeast Asia from the mid-19th century by Logan and others revealed that they comprised four families: Tibeto-Burman, Tai, Mon–Khmer and Malayo-Polynesian. Julius Klaproth had noted in 1823 that Burmese, Tibetan, and Chinese all shared common basic vocabulary but that Thai, Mon, and Vietnamese were quite different. Ernst Kuhn envisaged a group with two branches, Chinese–Siamese and Tibeto-Burman. (Note: Kuhn (1889), p. 189: "wir das Tibetisch-Barmanische einerseits, das Chinesisch-Siamesische anderseits als deutlich geschiedene und doch wieder verwandte Gruppen einer einheitlichen Sprachfamilie anzuerkennen haben." (also quoted in van Driem (2001), p. 264.)) August Conrady called this group Indo-Chinese in his influential 1896 classification, though he had doubts about Karen. Conrady's terminology was widely used, but there was uncertainty regarding his exclusion of Vietnamese. Franz Nikolaus Finck in 1909 placed Karen as a third branch of Chinese–Siamese.

Jean Przyluski introduced the French term sino-tibétain as the title of his chapter on the group in Meillet and Cohen's Les langues du monde in 1924. He divided them into three groups: Tibeto-Burman, Chinese and Tai, and was uncertain about the affinity of Karen and Hmong–Mien. The English translation "Sino-Tibetan" first appeared in a short note by Przyluski and Luce in 1931.

=== Shafer and Benedict ===
In 1935, the anthropologist Alfred Kroeber started the Sino-Tibetan Philology Project, funded by the Works Project Administration and based at the University of California, Berkeley. The project was supervised by Robert Shafer until late 1938, and then by Paul K. Benedict. Under their direction, the staff of 30 non-linguists collated all the available documentation of Sino-Tibetan languages. The result was eight copies of a 15-volume typescript entitled Sino-Tibetan Linguistics. (Note: The volumes were: 1. Introduction and bibliography, 2. Bhotish, 3. West Himalayish, 4. West Central Himalayish, 5. East Himalayish, 6. Digarish, 7. Nungish, 8. Dzorgaish, 9. Hruso, 10. Dhimalish, 11. Baric, 12. Burmish–Lolish, 13. Kachinish, 14. Kukish, 15. Mruish.) This work was never published but furnished the data for a series of papers by Shafer, as well as Shafer's five-volume Introduction to Sino-Tibetan and Benedict's Sino-Tibetan, a Conspectus.

Benedict completed the manuscript of his work in 1941, but it was not published until 1972. Instead of building the entire family tree, he set out to reconstruct a Proto-Tibeto-Burman language by comparing five major languages, with occasional comparisons with other languages. He reconstructed a two-way distinction on initial consonants based on voicing, with aspiration conditioned by pre-initial consonants that had been retained in Tibetic but lost in many other languages. Thus, Benedict reconstructed the following initials:

TB	Tibetan	Jingpho	Burmese	Garo	Mizo	S'gaw Karen	Old Chinese (Note: Karlgren's reconstruction, with aspiration as 'h' and 'i̯' as 'j' to aid comparison.)
*k	k(h)	k(h) ~ g	k(h)	k(h) ~ g	k(h)	k(h)	*k(h)
*g	g	g ~ k(h)	k	g ~ k(h)	k	k(h)	*gh
*ŋ	ŋ	ŋ	ŋ	ŋ	ŋ	y	*ŋ
*t	t(h)	t(h) ~ d	t(h)	t(h) ~ d	t(h)	t(h)	*t(h)
*d	d	d ~ t(h)	t	d ~ t(h)	d	d	*dh
*n	n	n	n	n	n	n	*n ~ *ń
*p	p(h)	p(h) ~ b	p(h)	p(h) ~ b	p(h)	p(h)	*p(h)
*b	b	b ~ p(h)	p	b ~ p(h)	b	b	*bh
*m	m	m	m	m	m	m	*m
*ts	ts(h)	ts ~ dz	ts(h)	s ~ tś(h)	s	s(h)	*ts(h)
*dz	dz	dz ~ ts ~ ś	ts	tś(h)	f	s(h)	?
*s	s	s	s	th	th	θ	*s
*z	z	z ~ ś	s	s	f	θ	?
*r	r	r	r	r	r	γ	*l
*l	l	l	l	l	l	l	*l
*h	h	∅	h	∅	h	h	*x
*w	∅	w	w	w	w	w	*gjw
*y	y	y	y	tś ~ dź	z	y	*dj ~ *zj

Although the initial consonants of cognates tend to have the same place and manner of articulation, voicing and aspiration are often unpredictable. This irregularity was attacked by Roy Andrew Miller, though Benedict's supporters attribute it to the effects of prefixes that have been lost and are often unrecoverable. The issue remains unsolved today. It was cited together with the lack of reconstructable shared morphology, and evidence that much shared lexical material has been borrowed from Chinese into Tibeto-Burman, by Christopher Beckwith, one of the few scholars still arguing that Chinese is not related to Tibeto-Burman.

Benedict also reconstructed, at least for Tibeto-Burman, prefixes such as the causative s-, the intransitive m-, and r-, b- g- and d- of uncertain function, as well as suffixes -s, -t and -n.

=== Study of literary languages ===
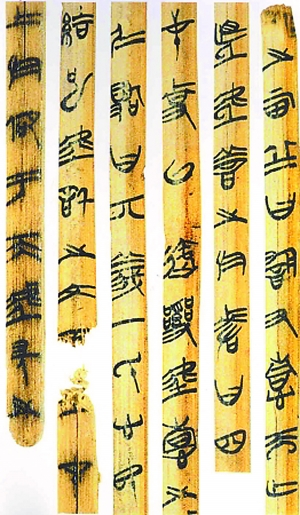
Ancient Chinese text on bamboo strips

Old Chinese is by far the oldest recorded Sino-Tibetan language, with inscriptions dating from around 1250 BC and a huge body of literature from the first millennium BC. However, the Chinese script is logographic and does not represent sounds systematically; it is therefore difficult to reconstruct the phonology of the language from the written records. Scholars have sought to reconstruct the phonology of Old Chinese by comparing the obscure descriptions of the sounds of Middle Chinese in medieval dictionaries with phonetic elements in Chinese characters and the rhyming patterns of early poetry. The first complete reconstruction, the Grammata Serica Recensa of Bernard Karlgren, was used by Benedict and Shafer.

Karlgren's reconstruction was somewhat unwieldy, with many sounds having a highly non-uniform distribution. Later scholars have revised it by drawing on a range of other sources. Some proposals were based on cognates in other Sino-Tibetan languages, though workers have also found solely Chinese evidence for them. For example, recent reconstructions of Old Chinese have reduced Karlgren's 15 vowels to a six-vowel system originally suggested by Nicholas Bodman. Similarly, Karlgren's *l has been recast as *r, with a different initial interpreted as *l, matching Tibeto-Burman cognates, but also supported by Chinese transcriptions of foreign names. A growing number of scholars believe that Old Chinese did not use tones and that the tones of Middle Chinese developed from final consonants. One of these, *-s, is believed to be a suffix, with cognates in other Sino-Tibetan languages.

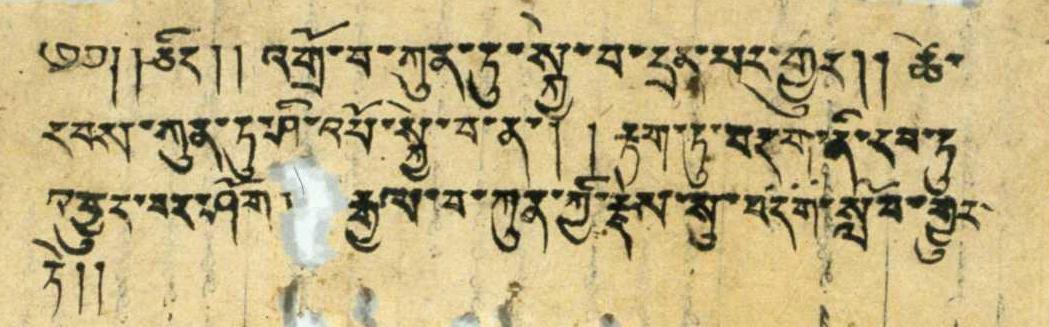
Old Tibetan text found at Turfan

Tibetic has extensive written records from the adoption of writing by the Tibetan Empire in the mid-7th century. The earliest records of Burmese (such as the 12th-century Myazedi inscription) are more limited, but later an extensive literature developed. Both languages are recorded in abugida scripts ultimately derived from the Brahmi script of Ancient India. Most comparative work has used the conservative written forms of these languages, following the dictionaries of Jäschke (Tibetan) and Judson (Burmese), though both contain entries from a wide range of periods.

There are also extensive records in Tangut, the language of the Western Xia (1038–1227). Tangut is recorded in a Chinese-inspired logographic script, whose interpretation presents many difficulties, even though multilingual dictionaries have been found.

Gong Hwang-cherng has compared Old Chinese, Written Tibetan, Burmese, and Tangut to establish sound correspondences between those languages, as he identifies these four languages as the most influential literary languages within the family for their abundance in textual evidence. He found that Tibetic and Burmese /a/ correspond to two Old Chinese vowels, *a and *ə. While this has been considered evidence for a separate Tibeto-Burman subgroup, Hill (2014) finds that Burmese has distinct correspondences for Old Chinese rhymes -ay : *-aj and -i : *-əj, and hence argues that the development *ə > *a occurred independently in Tibetan and Burmese.

Other languages with historical texts have also come to the attention of linguists more recently, such as Classical Newar, Loloish languages written in the Yi script, Lepcha, and Meiteilon. But higher-grade reconstructions for these languages and their subbranches are yet to be established.

=== Fieldwork ===
The descriptions of non-literary languages used by Shafer and Benedict were often produced by missionaries and colonial administrators of varying linguistic skills. Most of the smaller Sino-Tibetan languages are spoken in inaccessible mountainous areas, many of which are politically or militarily sensitive and thus closed to investigators. Until the 1980s, the best-studied areas were Nepal and northern Thailand. In the 1980s and 1990s, new surveys were published from the Himalayas and southwestern China. Of particular interest was the increasing literature on the Qiangic languages of western Sichuan and adjacent areas.

== Distribution ==
Distribution of the larger branches of Sino-Tibetan, with proportion of first-language speakers: Sinitic (94.3%) Lolo–Burmese (3.4%) Tibetic (0.4%) / Karenic (0.3%) others (1.6%)

Most of the current spread of Sino-Tibetan languages is the result of historical expansions of the three groups with the most speakers – Chinese, Burmese and Tibetic – replacing an unknown number of earlier languages. These groups also have the longest literary traditions of the family. The remaining languages are spoken in mountainous areas, along the southern slopes of the Himalayas, the Southeast Asian Massif and the eastern edge of the Tibetan Plateau.

=== Contemporary languages ===
The branch with the largest number of speakers by far is the Sinitic languages, with 1.3 billion speakers, most of whom live in the eastern half of China. The first records of Chinese are oracle bone inscriptions from c. 1250 BC, when Old Chinese was spoken around the middle reaches of the Yellow River. Chinese has since expanded throughout China, forming a family whose diversity has been compared with the Romance languages. Diversity is greater in the rugged terrain of southeast China than in the North China Plain.

Burmese is the national language of Myanmar, and the first language of some 33 million people. Burmese speakers first entered the northern Irrawaddy basin from what is now western Yunnan in the early ninth century, in conjunction with an invasion by Nanzhao that shattered the Pyu city-states. Other Burmish languages are still spoken in Dehong Prefecture in the far west of Yunnan. By the 11th century, their Pagan Kingdom had expanded over the whole basin. The oldest texts, such as the Myazedi inscription, date from the early 12th century. The closely related Loloish languages are spoken by 9 million people in the mountains of western Sichuan, Yunnan, and nearby areas in northern Myanmar, Thailand, Laos, and Vietnam.

The Tibetic languages are spoken by some 6 million people on the Tibetan Plateau and neighbouring areas in the Himalayas and western Sichuan. They are descended from Old Tibetan, which was originally spoken in the Yarlung Valley before it was spread by the expansion of the Tibetan Empire in the seventh century. Although the empire collapsed in the ninth century, Classical Tibetan remained influential as the liturgical language of Tibetan Buddhism.

The remaining languages are spoken in upland areas. Southernmost are the Karen languages, spoken by 4 million people in the hill country along the Myanmar–Thailand border, with the greatest diversity in the Karen Hills, which are believed to be the homeland of the group. The highlands stretching from northeast India to northern Myanmar contain over 100 highly diverse Sino-Tibetan languages. Other Sino-Tibetan languages are found along the southern slopes of the Himalayas and the eastern edge of the Tibetan plateau. The 22 official languages listed in the Eighth Schedule to the Constitution of India include only two Sino-Tibetan languages, namely Meitei (officially called Manipuri) and Bodo.

=== Homeland ===
There has been a range of proposals for the Sino-Tibetan urheimat, reflecting the uncertainty about the classification of the family and its time depth. Three major hypotheses for the place and time of Sino-Tibetan unity have been presented:

- The most commonly cited hypothesis associates the family with the Neolithic Yangshao culture (7000–5000 years BP) of the Yellow River basin, with an expansion driven by millet agriculture. This scenario is associated with a proposed primary split between Sinitic in the east and the Tibeto-Burman languages, often assigned to the Majiayao culture (5300–4000 years BP) in the upper reaches of the Yellow River on the northeast edge of the Tibetan Plateau. For example, James Matisoff proposes a split around 6000 years BP, with Chinese-speakers settling along the Yellow River and other groups migrating south down the Yangtze, Mekong, Salween and Brahmaputra rivers.
- George van Driem proposes a Sino-Tibetan homeland in the Sichuan Basin before 9000 years BP, with an associated taxonomy reflecting various outward migrations over time, first into northeast India, and later north (the predecessors of Chinese and Tibetic) and south (Karen and Lolo–Burmese).
- Roger Blench argues that agriculture cannot be reconstructed for Proto-Sino-Tibetan. Blench and Mark Post have proposed that the earliest speakers of Sino-Tibetan were not farmers but highly diverse foragers in the eastern foothills of the Himalayas in Northeast India, the area of greatest diversity, around 9000 years BP. They then envisage a series of migrations over the following millennia, with Sinitic representing one of the groups that migrated into China.

Zhang et al. (2019) performed a computational phylogenetic analysis of 109 Sino-Tibetan languages to suggest a Sino-Tibetan homeland in northern China near the Yellow River basin. The study further suggests that there was an initial major split between the Sinitic and Tibeto-Burman languages approximately 4,200 to 7,800 years ago (with an average of 5,900 years ago), associated with the Yangshao or the Majiayao culture, or with both. Sagart et al. (2019) performed another phylogenetic analysis based on different data and methods to arrive at an earlier root age of approximately 7,200 years ago, but were not able to identify the top-level split. They arrived at similar conclusions regarding the homeland, associating it with millet farmers of the late Cishan culture and early Yangshao culture. Both of these studies have been criticized by Georg Orlandi (2021) for their reliance on lexical items, which are not seen as robust indicators of language ancestry. Another study, seeking to identify horizontal diffusion rather than phylogenetic descent, also suggested dispersal from the upper Yellow River area.

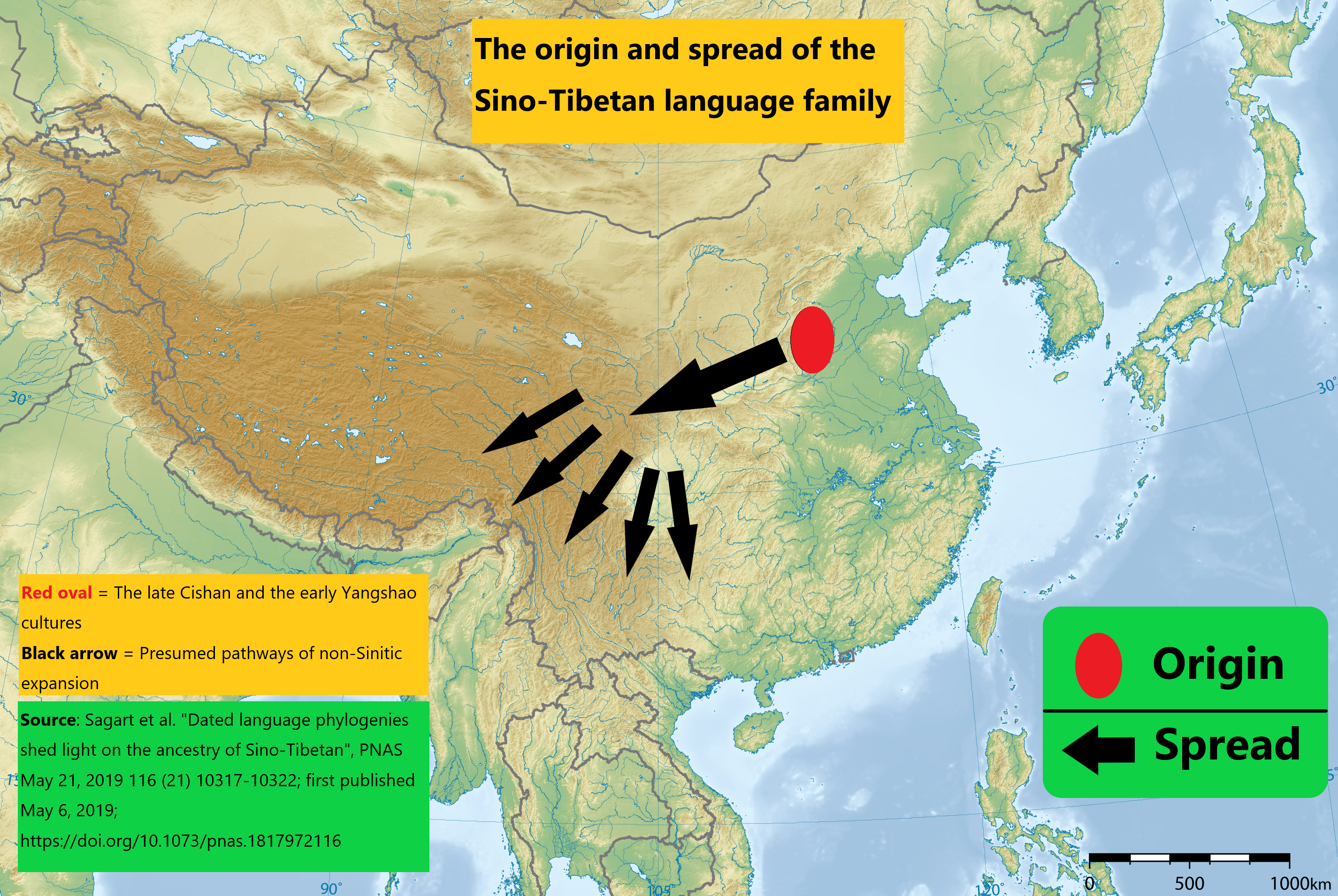
Hypothesised homeland and dispersal according to Sagart et al. (2019)

Hypothesised homeland and dispersal according to van Driem (2005)

Hypothesised homeland and dispersal according to Blench (2009)

== Classification ==
Several low-level branches of the family, particularly Lolo–Burmese, have been securely reconstructed, but in the absence of a secure reconstruction of a Sino-Tibetan proto-language, the higher-level structure of the family remains unclear. Thus, a conservative classification of Sino-Tibetan/Tibeto-Burman would posit several dozen small coordinate families and isolates; attempts at subgrouping are either geographic conveniences or hypotheses for further research.

=== Li (1937) ===
In a survey in the 1937 Chinese Yearbook, Li Fang-Kuei described the family as consisting of four branches:

- Indo-Chinese (Sino-Tibetan)
  - Chinese
  - Tai (later expanded to Kam–Tai)
  - Miao–Yao (Hmong–Mien)
  - Tibeto-Burman

Tai and Miao–Yao were included because they shared isolating typology, tone systems and some vocabulary with Chinese. At the time, tone was considered so fundamental to language that tonal typology could be used as the basis for classification. In the Western scholarly community, these languages are no longer included in Sino-Tibetan, with the similarities attributed to diffusion across the Mainland Southeast Asia linguistic area, especially since Benedict (1942). The exclusions of Vietnamese by Kuhn and of Tai and Miao–Yao by Benedict were vindicated in 1954 when André-Georges Haudricourt demonstrated that the tones of Vietnamese were reflexes of final consonants from Proto-Mon-Khmer.

Many Chinese linguists continue to follow Li's classification. (Note: See, for example, the "Sino-Tibetan" (汉藏语系 Hàn-Zàng yǔxì) entry in the "languages" (語言文字, Yǔyán-Wénzì) volume of the Encyclopedia of China (1988).) However, this arrangement remains problematic. For example, there is disagreement over whether to include the entire Kra–Dai family or just Kam–Tai (Zhuang–Dong excludes the Kra languages), because the Chinese cognates that form the basis of the putative relationship are not found in all branches of the family and have not been reconstructed for the family as a whole. In addition, Kam–Tai itself no longer appears to be a valid node within Kra–Dai.

=== Benedict (1942) ===
Benedict overtly excluded Vietnamese (placing it in Mon–Khmer) as well as Hmong–Mien and Kra–Dai (placing them in Austro-Tai). He otherwise retained the outlines of Conrady's Indo-Chinese classification, though putting Karen in an intermediate position:

- Sino-Tibetan
  - Chinese
  - Tibeto-Karen
    - Karen
    - Tibeto-Burman

=== Shafer (1955) ===
Shafer criticized the division of the family into Tibeto-Burman and Sino-Daic branches, which he attributed to the different groups of languages studied by Konow and other scholars in British India on the one hand and by Henri Maspero and other French linguists on the other. He proposed a detailed classification, with six top-level divisions: (Note: For Shafer, the suffix "-ic" denoted a primary division of the family, whereas the suffix "-ish" denoted a sub-division of one of those.)

- Sino-Tibetan
  - Sinitic
  - Daic
  - Bodic
  - Burmic
  - Baric
  - Karenic

Shafer was sceptical of the inclusion of Daic, but after meeting Maspero in Paris decided to retain it pending a definitive resolution of the question.

=== Matisoff (1978, 2015) ===
James Matisoff abandoned Benedict's Tibeto-Karen hypothesis:

- Sino-Tibetan
  - Chinese
  - Tibeto-Burman

Some more-recent Western scholars, such as Bradley (1997) and La Polla (2003), have retained Matisoff's two primary branches, though differing in the details of Tibeto-Burman. However, Jacques (2006) notes, "comparative work has never been able to put forth evidence for common innovations to all the Tibeto-Burman languages (the Sino-Tibetan languages to the exclusion of Chinese)" (Note: les travaux de comparatisme n'ont jamais pu mettre en évidence l'existence d'innovations communes à toutes les langues « tibéto-birmanes » (les langues sino-tibétaines à l'exclusion du chinois)) and that "it no longer seems justified to treat Chinese as the first branching of the Sino-Tibetan family," (Note: il ne semble plus justifié de traiter le chinois comme le premier embranchement primaire de la famille sino-tibétaine) because the morphological divide between Chinese and Tibeto-Burman has been bridged by recent reconstructions of Old Chinese.

The internal structure of Sino-Tibetan has been tentatively revised as the following Stammbaum by Matisoff in the final print release of the Sino-Tibetan Etymological Dictionary and Thesaurus (STEDT) in 2015. Matisoff acknowledges that the position of Chinese within the family remains an open question.

- Sino-Tibetan
  - Chinese
  - Tibeto-Burman
    - Northeast Indian areal group
      - "North Assam"
        - Tani
        - Deng
      - Kuki-Chin
      - "Naga" areal group
        - Central Naga (Ao group)
        - Angami–Pochuri group
        - Zeme group
        - Tangkhulic
      - Meitei
      - Mikir / Karbi
      - Mru
      - Sal
        - Bodo–Garo
        - Northern Naga / Konyakian
        - Jingpho–Asakian
    - Himalayish
      - Tibeto-Kanauri
        - Western Himalayish
        - Bodic
        - Lepcha
        - Tamangish
        - Dhimal
      - Newar
      - Kiranti
      - Kham-Magar-Chepang
    - Tangut-Qiang
      - Tangut
      - Qiangic
      - Rgyalrongic
    - Nungic
    - Tujia
    - Lolo–Burmese–Naxi
      - Lolo-Burmese
      - Naxi
    - Karenic
    - Bai

=== Starostin (1996) ===
Sergei Starostin proposed that both the Kiranti languages and Chinese are divergent from a "core" Tibeto-Burman of at least Bodish, Lolo–Burmese, Tamangic, Jinghpaw, Kukish, and Karen (other families were not analysed) in a hypothesis called Sino-Kiranti. The proposal takes two forms: that Sinitic and Kiranti are themselves a valid node or that the two are not demonstrably close so that Sino-Tibetan has three primary branches:

- Sino-Tibetan (version 1)
  - Sino-Kiranti
  - Tibeto-Burman
- Sino-Tibetan (version 2)
  - Chinese
  - Kiranti
  - Tibeto-Burman

=== Van Driem (1997, 2001) ===
George van Driem, like Shafer, rejects a primary split between Chinese and the rest, suggesting that Chinese owes its traditional privileged place in Sino-Tibetan to historical, typological, and cultural, rather than linguistic, criteria. He calls the entire family "Tibeto-Burman", a name he says has historical primacy, but other linguists who reject a privileged position for Chinese nevertheless continue to call the resulting family "Sino-Tibetan".

Like Matisoff, van Driem acknowledges that the relationships of the Kuki-Naga languages (Kuki, Mizo, Meitei, etc.), both amongst each other and to the other languages of the family, remain unclear. However, rather than placing them in a geographic grouping, as Matisoff does, van Driem leaves them unclassified. He has proposed several hypotheses, including the reclassification of Chinese to a Sino-Bodic subgroup:

- Tibeto-Burman
  - Western (Baric, Brahmaputran, or Sal): Dhimal, Bodo–Garo, Konyak, Kachin–Luic
  - Eastern
    - Northern (Sino-Bodic)
      - Northwestern (Bodic): Bodish, Kirantic, West Himalayish, Tamangic and several isolates
      - Northeastern (Sinitic)
    - Southern
      - Southwestern: Lolo-Burmese, Karenic
      - Southeastern: Qiangic, Jiarongic
  - Some other small families and isolates as primary branches (Newar, Nungish, Magaric, etc.)

Van Driem points to two main pieces of evidence establishing a special relationship between Sinitic and Bodic and thus placing Chinese within the Tibeto-Burman family. First, there are some parallels between the morphology of Old Chinese and the modern Bodic languages. Second, there is a body of lexical cognates between the Chinese and Bodic languages, represented by the Kirantic language Limbu.

In response, Matisoff notes that the existence of shared lexical material only serves to establish an absolute relationship between two language families, not their relative relationship to one another. Although some cognate sets presented by van Driem are confined to Chinese and Bodic, many others are found in Sino-Tibetan languages generally and thus do not serve as evidence for a special relationship between Chinese and Bodic.

=== Van Driem's "fallen leaves" model (2001, 2014) ===
Van Driem has also proposed a "fallen leaves" model that lists dozens of well-established low-level groups while remaining agnostic about intermediate groupings of these. In the most recent version (van Driem 2014), 42 groups are identified (with individual languages highlighted in italics):

- Bodish
- Tshangla
- West Himalayish
- Tamangic
- Newaric
- Kiranti
- Lepcha
- Magaric
- Chepangic
- Raji–Raute
- Dura
- 'Ole
- Gongduk
- Lhokpu
- Siangic
- Kho-Bwa
- Hrusish
- Digarish
- Midžuish
- Tani
- Dhimalish
- Brahmaputran (Sal)
- Pyu
- Ao
- Angami–Pochuri
- Tangkhul
- Zeme
- Meithei
- Kukish
- Karbi
- Mru
- Sinitic
- Bai
- Tujia
- Lolo-Burmese
- Qiangic
- Ersuish
- Naic
- Rgyalrongic
- Kachinic
- Nungish
- Karenic

He also suggested (van Driem 2007) that the Sino-Tibetan language family be renamed "Trans-Himalayan", which he considers to be more neutral.

Orlandi (2021) also considers the van Driem's Trans-Himalayan fallen leaves model to be more plausible than the bifurcate classification of Sino-Tibetan being split into Sinitic and Tibeto-Burman.

=== Blench and Post (2014) ===
Roger Blench and Mark W. Post have criticized the applicability of conventional Sino-Tibetan classification schemes to minor languages lacking an extensive written history (unlike Chinese, Tibetic, and Burmese). They find that the evidence for the subclassification or even ST affiliation in all of several minor languages of northeastern India, in particular, is either poor or absent altogether.

While relatively little has been known about the languages of this region up to and including the present time, this has not stopped scholars from proposing that these languages either constitute or fall within some other Tibeto-Burman subgroup. However, in the absence of any sort of systematic comparison – whether the data are thought reliable or not – such "subgroupings" are essentially vacuous. The use of pseudo-genetic labels such as "Himalayish" and "Kamarupan" inevitably gives an impression of coherence which is at best misleading.

— Blench & Post (2014), p. 3

In their view, many such languages would for now be best considered unclassified, or "internal isolates" within the family. They propose a provisional classification of the remaining languages:

- Sino-Tibetan
  - Karbi (Mikir)
  - Mruish
      - Tani
      - Nagish: Ao, Kuki-Chin, Tangkhul, Zeme, Angami–Pochuri and Meitei
      - Western: Gongduk, 'Ole, Mahakiranti, Lepcha, Kham–Magaric–Chepang, Tamangic, and Lhokpu
      - Karenic
      - Jingpho–Konyak–Bodo
      - Eastern
        - Tujia
        - Bai
        - Northern Qiangic
        - Southern Qiangic
          - Chinese (Sinitic)
          - Lolo-Burmese–Naic
          - Bodish
        - Nungish

Following that, because they propose that the three best-known branches may be much closer related to each other than they are to "minor" Sino-Tibetan languages, Blench and Post argue that "Sino-Tibetan" or "Tibeto-Burman" are inappropriate names for a family whose earliest divergences led to different languages altogether. They support the proposed name "Trans-Himalayan".

=== Menghan Zhang, Shi Yan, et al. (2019) ===
A team of researchers led by Pan Wuyun and Jin Li proposed the following phylogenetic tree in 2019, based on lexical items:

- Sino-Tibetan
  - Sinitic
  - Tibeto-Burman
      - Karenic
      - Kuki-Chin–Naga
      - Sal
          - Digarish
          - Tani
            - Himalayish
            - Nungish
            - Kinauri
                - Gurung-Tamang
                - Bodish
                  - Naic
                  - Ersuish, Qiangic, Rgyalrongic
                - Lolo-Burmese

== Typology ==
=== Word order ===
Except for the Chinese, Bai, Karenic, and Mruic languages, the usual word order in Sino-Tibetan languages is object–verb. However, Chinese and Bai differ from almost all other subject–verb–object languages in the world in placing relative clauses before the nouns they modify. Most scholars believe SOV to be the original order, with Chinese, Karen, and Bai having acquired SVO order due to the influence of neighbouring languages in the Mainland Southeast Asia linguistic area. This has been criticized as being insufficiently corroborated by Djamouri et al. 2007, who instead reconstruct a VO order for Proto-Sino-Tibetan.

=== Phonology ===
Contrastive tones are a feature found across the family although absent in some languages like Purik. Phonation contrasts are also present among many, notably in the Lolo-Burmese group. While Benedict contended that Proto-Tibeto-Burman would have a two-tone system, Matisoff refrained from reconstructing it since tones in individual languages may have developed independently through the process of tonogenesis.

=== Morphology ===
==== The structure of words ====
Sino-Tibetan is structurally one of the most diverse language families in the world, including all of the gradation of morphological complexity from isolating (Lolo-Burmese, Tujia) to polysynthetic (Gyalrongic, Kiranti) languages. While Sinitic languages are normally taken to be a prototypical example of the isolating morphological type, southern Chinese languages express this trait far more strongly than northern Chinese languages do.

==== Voice and Voicing alternation ====
Initial consonant alternations related to transitivity are pervasive in Sino-Tibetan; while devoicing (or aspiration) of the initial is associated with a transitive/causative verb, voicing is linked to its intransitive/anticausative counterpart. This is argued to reflect morphological derivations that existed in earlier stages of the family. Even in Chinese, one would find semantically-related pairs of verbs such as 見 'to see' (MC: kenH) and 現 'to appear' (ɣenH), which are respectively reconstructed as *[k]ˤen-s and *N-[k]ˤen-s in the Baxter-Sagart system of Old Chinese.

==== Ergativity ====
In morphosyntactic alignment, many Tibeto-Burman languages have ergative and/or anti-ergative (an argument that is not an actor) case marking. However, the anti-ergative case markings can not be reconstructed at higher levels in the family and are thought to be innovations.

==== Person indexation ====
Many Sino-Tibetan languages exhibit a system of person indexation. Notably, Gyalrongic and Kiranti have an inverse marker prefixed to a transitive verb when the agent is lower than the patient in a certain person hierarchy.

Hodgson had in 1849 noted a dichotomy between "pronominalized" (inflecting) languages, stretching across the Himalayas from Himachal Pradesh to eastern Nepal, and "non-pronominalized" (isolating) languages. Konow (1909) explained the pronominalized languages as due to a Munda substratum, with the idea that Indo-Chinese languages were essentially isolating as well as tonal. Maspero later attributed the putative substratum to Indo-Aryan. It was not until Benedict that the inflectional systems of these languages were recognized as (partially) native to the family. Scholars disagree over the extent to which the agreement system in the various languages can be reconstructed for the proto-language.

=== Evidentiality, mirativity, and egophoricity ===
Although not very common in some families and linguistic areas like Standard Average European, fairly complex systems of evidentiality (grammatical marking of information source) are found in many Tibeto-Burman languages. The family has also contributed to the study of mirativity and egophoricity, which are relatively new concepts in linguistic typology.

== Vocabulary ==
Sino-Tibetan numerals
gloss	Old Chinese	Old Tibetan	Old Burmese	Jingpho	Garo	Limbu	Kanauri	Tujia
"one"	一 *ʔi[t]	–	ac	–	sa	–	id	–
"one"	隻 *tek "single"	gcig	tac	–		thik	–	–
"two"	二 *ni[j]-s	gnyis	nhac	–	gini	nɛtchi	niš	ne⁵⁵
"three"	三 *s.rum	gsum	sumḥ	mə̀sūm	gittam	sumsi	sum	so⁵⁵
"four"	四 *s.li[t]-s	bzhi	liy	mə̀lī	bri	lisi	pə:	ze⁵⁵
"five"	五 *C.ŋˤaʔ	lnga	ṅāḥ	mə̀ŋā	boŋa	nasi	ṅa	ũ⁵⁵
"six"	六 *k.ruk	drug	khrok	krúʔ	dok	tuksi	țuk	wo²¹
"seven"	七 *[tsʰ]i[t]	–	khu-nac	sə̀nìt	sini	nusi	štiš	ne²¹
"eight"	八 *pˤret	brgyad	rhac	mə̀tshát	chet	yɛtchi	rəy	je²¹
"nine"	九 *[k]uʔ	dgu	kuiḥ	cə̀khù	sku	sku	sgui	kɨe⁵⁵
"ten"	十 *t.[g]əp	–	kip	–	–	gip	–	–
"ten"	–	bcu	chay	shī	chikuŋ	–	səy	–

== Proposed external relationships ==
Beyond the traditionally recognized families of Southeast Asia, some possible broader relationships have been suggested.

=== Austronesian ===
Laurent Sagart proposes a "Sino-Austronesian" family with Sino-Tibetan and Austronesian (including Kra–Dai as a subbranch) as primary branches. Stanley Starosta has extended this proposal with a further branch called "Yangzian" joining Hmong–Mien and Austroasiatic. The proposal has been largely rejected by other linguists who argue that the similarities between Austronesian and Sino-Tibetan more likely arose from contact rather than being genetic.

=== Dene–Yeniseian ===
The "Sino-Caucasian" hypothesis of Sergei Starostin posits that the Yeniseian languages form a clade with Sino-Tibetan, which he called Sino-Yeniseian. The Sino–Caucasian hypothesis has been expanded by others to "Dene–Caucasian" to include the Na-Dene languages of North America, Burushaski, Basque and, occasionally, Etruscan. A narrower binary Dene–Yeniseian family has recently been well received. The validity of the rest of the family, however, is viewed as doubtful or rejected by nearly all historical linguists. An updated tree by Georgiy Starostin now groups Na-Dene with Sino-Tibetan and Yeniseian with Burushaski (Karasuk hypothesis).

George van Driem does not believe that Sino-Tibetan (which he calls "Trans-Himalayan") and Yeniseian are related language families. However, he argues that Yeniseian speakers once populated the North China Plain and that Proto-Sinitic speakers assimilated them when they migrated to the region. As a result, Sinitic acquired creoloid characteristics when it came to be used as a lingua franca among ethnolinguistically diverse populations.

A link between the Na-Dene languages and Sino-Tibetan languages, known as Sino-Dene was first proposed by Edward Sapir. Around 1920, Sapir became convinced that Na-Dene was more closely related to Sino-Tibetan than to other American families. He wrote a series of letters to Alfred Kroeber where he enthusiastically spoke of a connection between Na-Dene and "Indo-Chinese". In 1925, a supporting article summarizing his thoughts, albeit not written by him, entitled "The Similarities of Chinese and Indian Languages", was published in Science Supplements. The Sino-Dene hypothesis never gained foothold outside of Sapir’s circle, though it was later revitalized by Robert Shafer and Morris Swadesh.

=== Indo-European ===
In the 20th century, R. Shafer put forward the conjecture of a Eurasial language super-family and listed hundreds of similar words between Tibeto-Burman and Indo-European languages. However, neither of these theories have been widely accepted by mainstream linguists.
