= Kaman =

Kaman may refer to:

- Kaman (surname)
- Kamein (Kaman), an ethnic group in Burma
- Kaman Aircraft, an American aerospace company and helicopter manufacturer
- Kaman Music Corporation, a company of several musical instrument manufacturers
- Kaman Road, a railway station on the Mumbai Suburban Railway in Mumbai, India
- Kamadeva, the Hindu god of human love
- Kaman (Miju) Mishmis, a people of northeastern India and Tibet
  - Kaman language or Miju Mishmi language, their Sino-Tibetan language

== Places ==
- Kaman, Iran, a village in Qazvin Province, Iran
- Kaman, Rajasthan, a city and municipality in the Bharatpur district of Rajasthan, India
- Kaman, Pakistan, town in Punjab, Pakistan
- Kaman, Kırşehir, a town of Turkey
- Kaman District, a district of Kırşehir Province, Turkey

== See also ==
- Kamman (disambiguation)
- Kamani (disambiguation)
- Miju (disambiguation)
