= Idu II =

23rd-century BC Egyptian official

Idu
- Nomarch of the 6th nome of Upper Egypt
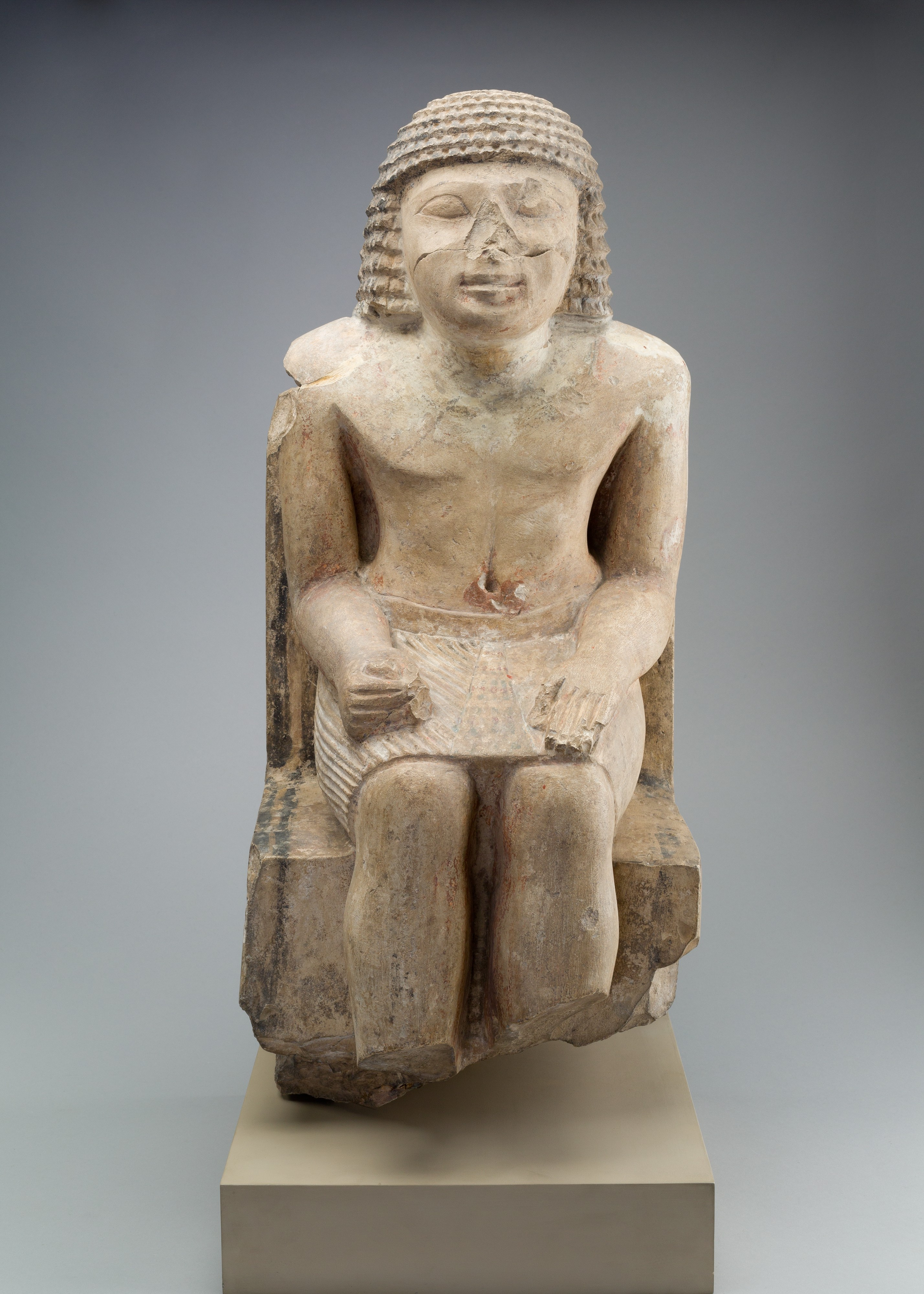
- Statue of Idu II, now New York, Metropolitan Museum
- Predecessor: Idu I (possibly)
- Successor: Tjauti (possibly)
- Dynasty: 6th dynasty

Idu II (more correctly just Idu, the numbering is modern) was an ancient Egyptian official who is known from his mastaba tomb at Denderah in Upper Egypt. He lived at the end of the 6th Dynasty and was perhaps the successor of Idu I.

Idu bore many important titles; most importantly he was governor of the Sixth Upper Egyptian nome, Iqer (the Egyptian title translates asː overlord of a province). Other titles include royal sealer, sole friend and lector priest.

His mastaba is a large mud brick building with an underground burial chamber excavated by William Matthew Flinders Petrie. It is placed next to the mastaba of Idu I and is just a little bit smaller. Here were found fragments of stelae and a statue. The stelae preserved the name and the titles of Idu II.

== Literature ==
- Henry George Fischer: Dendera in the third millennium B.C., down to the Theban domination of upper Egypt New York 1968
- William Matthew Flinders Petrie: Dendereh 1898. Egypt Exploration Fund, London 1900. online
