= IDU =

Idu or IDU may refer to:

- Indoor unit of an Australian National Broadband Network fixed wireless connection, see NTD (NBN)
- International Democracy Union, an international alliance of conservative political parties
- Idu, Iran, a village in Razavi Khorasan Province, Iran
- Idu, Abuja, a neighbourhood of Abuja, Nigeria
- Idu script, archaic writing system that represents the Korean language using hanja
- Idu Mishmi language, the language of the Idu Mishmi people
- Hongcheon Idu FC, South Korean football club
- Injecting drug user, see Drug injection
- Idu G7102, an official during the Sixth Dynasty of Egypt, buried in tomb G7102 of the Giza East Field
- Idu (novel), a 1970 novel by Flora Nwapa
- Izmir Democracy University, a public university located in Izmir, Turkey

== See also ==
- Idu Mishmi (disambiguation)
