= Tjauti (nomarch of Iqer) =

23rd-century BC Egyptian official

- Nomarch of the 6th nome of Upper Egypt
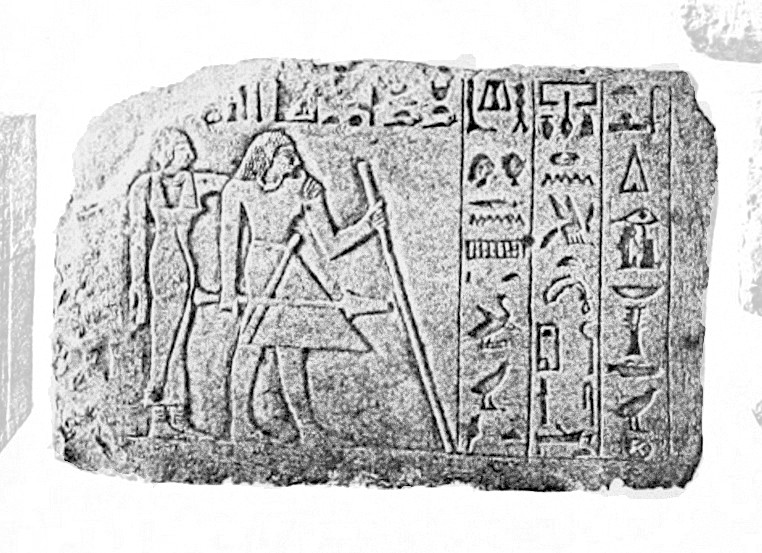
- Fragmentary stela of Tjauti, from Denderah
- Predecessor: Idu II (possibly)
- Dynasty: 6th Dynasty

Tjauti was an ancient Egyptian official who is known from inscriptions found at the cemetery at Denderah in Upper Egypt. He lived at the end of the 6th Dynasty and was perhaps the successor of Idu II as governor of the province.

Tjauti bears several titles, most importantly he was governor of the Sixth Upper Egyptian nome, Iqer (the Egyptian title translates asː overlord of a province). Other titles include royal sealer, sole friend, lector priest and ruler of the domain. He is known from several stelae. They were found at several places so that it is difficult to assign to Tjauti a specific mastaba tomb. Several mastabas has been proposed.

== Literature ==
- Henry George Fischer: Dendera in the third millennium B.C., down to the Theban domination of upper Egypt New York 1968
- William Matthew Flinders Petrie: Dendereh 1898. Egypt Exploration Fund, London 1900. online
