= Kamman =

Kamman may refer to:

- Doda Kamman, a village in Sultanpur Lodhi in Kapurthala district of Punjab State, India
- The Kamman Building, or The John F. Kamman Building, a historic commercial building in Buffalo, New York
- Kam Man Food, a Chinese American Chinese supermarket chain, also known as KM Food

== People with the surname ==
- Curtis Warren Kamman (born 1939), American career diplomat
- Effie F. Kamman (1868–1933), American composer, pianist, music teacher and vaudeville performer
- Leigh Kamman (1922–2014), American radio host
- Madeleine Kamman (1931–2018), French chef and restaurateur, cookery teacher and author

== See also ==
- Kaman (disambiguation)
