= Idu I =

23rd-century BC Egyptian official

Idu
- Nomarch of the 6th nome of Upper Egypt
- Successor: Idu II (possibly)
- Dynasty: 6th dynasty

Idu I (more correctly just Idu, the numbering is modern) was an ancient Egyptian official who is known from his mastaba tomb at Denderah in Upper Egypt. He lived at the end of the 6th Dynasty. His successor was most likely Idu II.

Idu bore many important titles; most importantly he was governor of the Sixth Upper Egyptian nome, Iqer (the Egyptian title translates asː overlord of a province) and he was also overseer of Upper Egypt. Another important title was ruler of the estate of Men-ank-Neferkere, that is the pyramid complex of king Pepy II (about 2272 BC–c. 2202 BC). The latter position indicates that he lived under this king. Other titles include royal sealer and lector priest. A woman called Bebi is depicted in his tomb as his wife.

His mastaba is a huge mud brick building with an underground burial chamber excavated by William Matthew Flinders Petrie. It is the largest tomb at the cemeteries of Denderah. Within the overground mastaba was a cult chapel that was decorated with paintings. The paintings show Idu hunting in the marshes; the captions provide many of his titles and the name of his wife Bebi.

== Literature ==
- Henry George Fischer: Dendera in the third millennium B.C., down to the Theban domination of upper Egypt New York 1968
- William Matthew Flinders Petrie: Dendereh 1898. Egypt Exploration Fund, London 1900. onlin
