= Miju =

Miju may refer to:

- Miju Mishmi tribe or Kaman, a people of northeastern India and Tibet
- Miju languages or Midzu and Kman, proposed Sino-Tibetan language family
  - Miju language or Midzu or Kman and Kaman, Sino-Tibetan language spoken in India and Tibet

== See also ==
- Mishmi (disambiguation)
- Kaman (disambiguation)
