= Mishmi =

Mishmi may refer to:

- Mishmi Hills, between Tibet, China and Arunachal Pradesh, India
- Mishmi people, of Tibet and Arunachal Pradesh
  - Digaro Mishmi people
  - Idu Mishmi people
  - Miju Mishmi people
- Mishmi languages (disambiguation), various Sino-Tibetan language of the above people including:
  - Digaro Mishmi language
  - Idu Mishmi language
  - Miju-Mishmi language

== See also ==
- Digaro Mishmi (disambiguation)
- Idu Mishmi (disambiguation)
- Miju (disambiguation)
- Mishmi Garra (Garra rupecula), a species of ray-finned fish
- Mishmi takin, an endangered goat-antelope native to India, Myanmar and the People's Republic of China
- All Idu Mishmi Students Union, Arunachal Pradesh, India
