= Iqer =

Nome in ancient Egypt

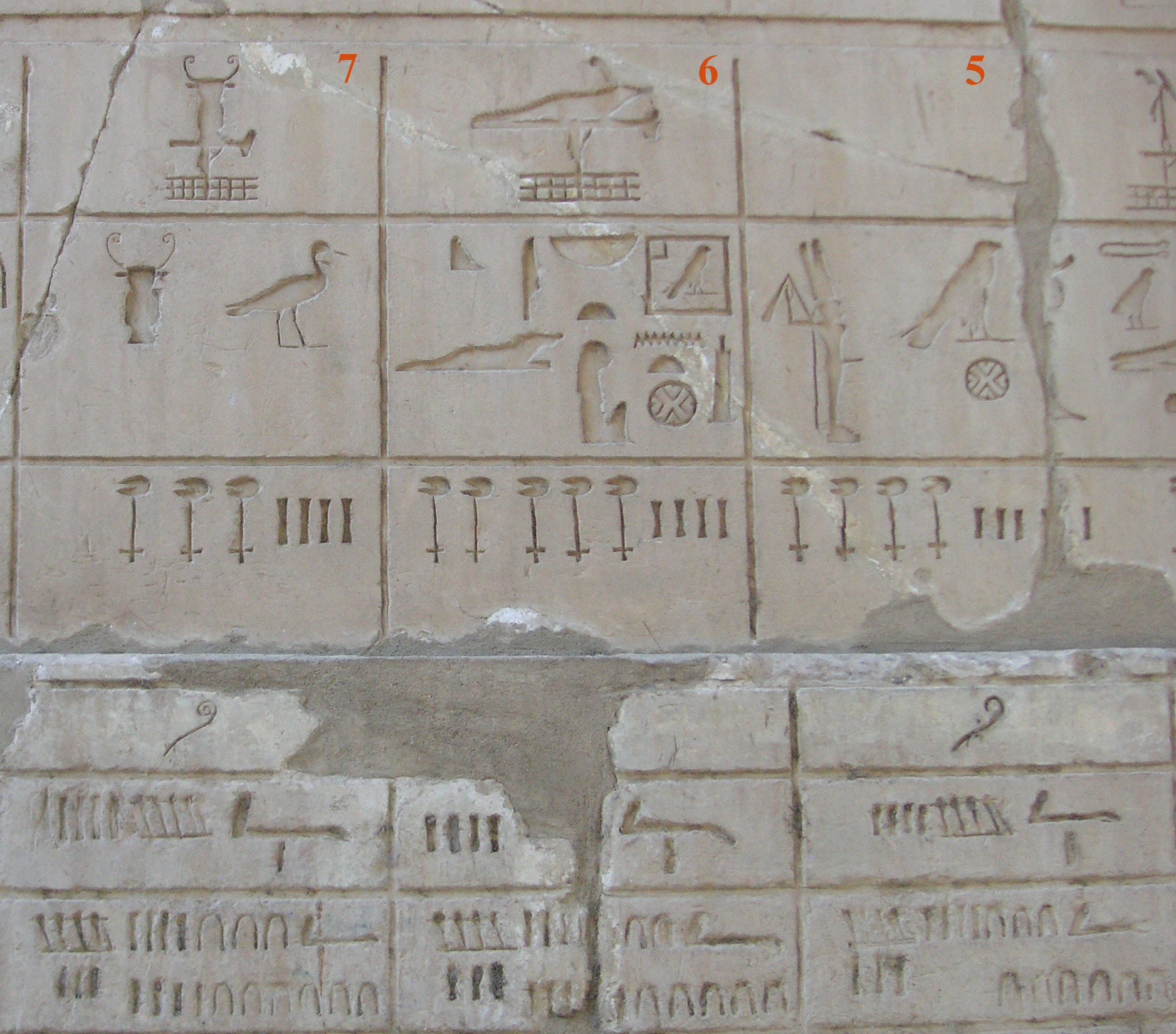
The Iqer nome on the White chapel of king Senusret I

Iqer was a nome in ancient Egypt, the sixth Upper province. Its capital was Iunet, modern Denderah. Next to Iunet, where Hathor was worshipped, a place called Shabet (identified by Henri Gauthier to be near modern Qena) was lying in the sixth Upper Egyptian nome, another place was Khadj. The exact locations of these towns is uncertain.

To the south it was bordered by the fifth nome centered on Coptos.

== History ==
=== Old Kingdom ===
In the 4th Dynasty, the nome is mentioned in an inscription dating to the reign of Sneferu. Khufu may have made foundations found at the Temple of Hathor.

In the 6th Dynasty, an early version of the Temple of Hathor may have been built by Pepi I and completed by Merenre.

- Governor Idu I is known from his mastaba at Dendera.
- Governor Idu II, from his mastaba at Dendera
- Governor Tauti, known from inscriptions found at Dendera
- Governor Meni, known from an inscription found at Dendera

=== Middle Kingdom ===
The name of the nome was written with the sign of a crocodile. The reading of this sign is not certain, Iq is another option. On the white chapel of Senusret I appears a list of all Egyptian nomes. Here the goddess Hathor is called lady of Iq.

=== Ptolemaic period ===
In the Ptolemaic (Greco-Roman) period, the nome was called Tentyrites, after Denderah, that appears in Greek sources as Tentyris. Several strategoi (governors) are known.
