= Idu Mishmi =

Idu Mishmi may refer to:

- Idu Mishmi people, of the Mishmi people of northeastern India and Tibet
- Idu Mishmi language, their Sino-Tibetan language

== See also ==
- IDU (disambiguation)
- Mishmi (disambiguation)
- All Idu Mishmi Students Union, Arunachal Pradesh, India
