= Digaro Mishmi =

Digaro Mishmi may refer to:

- Digaro Mishmi people, of the Mishmi people of northeastern India and Tibet
- Digaro languages or Northern Mishmi, a group of Sino-Tibetan languages of northeastern India and Tibet
  - Digaro Mishmi language or Taraon, Tawra and Darang, the Sino-Tibetan language of the above people

== See also ==
- Mishmi (disambiguation)
