= Idu (Ancient Egyptian official) =

- Tenure: c. 2310 BC
- Burial: G7102, Giza East Field
- Spouse: Meretyotes; Khenout
- Children: Qar, Idu, Hemi, Bendjet, and Iry

Idu (fl. c. 2310 BC) was an official during the Sixth Dynasty, buried in Giza East Field, tomb G7102. He probably lived and served during the reign of Pepi I. He is the father of Qar whose tomb is nearby and Bendjet, buried in G7215.

== Tomb ==
Idu lies in cemetery G7000, east of the related tomb of Qar. The mastaba exterior superstructure has disappeared.

== Family ==
The tomb depicts several members of his family:

- Wife: Meretyotes. Note than this woman is not the mother of Qar (G7101).
- Daughters: Bendjet (identified as the owner of G7215), Iry
- Sons: Qar, Idu, and Hemi

== Dependents ==
Several dependents of Qar were also represented with their most relevant titles:

- Indifiyni, steward (imy-rȝ pr).
- Isi, scribe (zš).
- idu, Ka servant (ḥm-kȝ).
- Idu,
- Ankhenf, Ka servant.
- Pehen-Path, scribe, inspector of the Ka servants (zš, sḥḏ ḥm(w)-kȝ).
- Nykhety, steward (wdpw).Nefermenekhet, singer (ḥst).
- Nekhet, scribe, steward.
- Qar, steward.
- Tidui, steward.

== Titles ==
His titles were:

Title	Translation	Index Jones
iwn knmwt	support of knmwt	22
imy-rȝ wp(w)t ḥtp(w)t-nṯr m prwy	overseer of the distribution of divine offerings in the two houses	403
imy-rȝ ḥwt-wrt	overseer of the great court/Hall of Justice	628
imy-rȝ zš(w) mrt	overseer of the scribes of the meret-serfs	795
wḏˁ-mdw	determiner of disputes	1507
mdw rḫyt	staff of the rekhyet-people	1698
ḥm-nṯr Mȝˁt	priest of Ma't	1930
ḥry-sštȝ n wḏˁ-mdw	counsellor in determining disputes.	2252
ḫnty-š Mn-nfr-ppy	land tenant of the town Pyramid of Pepy I	2531
ẖry-tp nzwt	king's liegeman/royal chamberlain	2874
smȝˁ (n) wḏˁ-mdw	one who sets right the judgement	3256
sḥḏ wˁb(w) ȝḫt-ḫwfw	inspector of the priests of Akhet-Khufu	3377
sḥḏ wˁb(w) Wr-ḫˁ.f-rˁ	inspector of the priest of (the pyramid), 'Great-is-Khafra'	3379
zš ˁ(w) (nw) nzwt	king's document scribe	3057
zš ˁ(w) (nw) nzwt ḫft-ḥr	king's document scribe in the presence	3063
zš mrt	scribe of the meret-serfs	3117
