= Idu, Iran =

Idu ايدو
- Village
- Location within Iran
- Coordinates: 34°09′38″N 58°35′47″E
- Country: Iran
- Province: Razavi Khorasan
- County: Gonabad
- Bakhsh: Kakhk
- Rural District: Kakhk

Population (2006)
  - Total: 64
- Time zone: UTC+3:30 (IRST)
  - Summer (DST): UTC+4:30 (IRDT)

Idu (Persian: ايدو, also Romanized as Īdū) is a village in Kakhk Rural District, Kakhk District, Gonabad County, Razavi Khorasan Province, Iran. At the 2006 census, its population was 64, in 23 families.
