= Kaman, Pakistan =

Coordinates: 31°2′30″N 73°9′0″E

- Town and union council
- Interactive map of Kaman, Pakistan
- Country: Pakistan
- Region: Punjab
- District: Okara District
- Time zone: UTC+5 (PST)

Kaman is a town and union council of Okara District in the Punjab province of Pakistan. It is located at 31°2'30N 73°9'0E at an altitude of 166 metres (547 feet).
