= Dendera =

Dendera ⲛⲓⲧⲛⲧⲱⲣⲉ ⲛⲓⲧⲉⲛⲧⲱⲣⲓ دندرة
- City
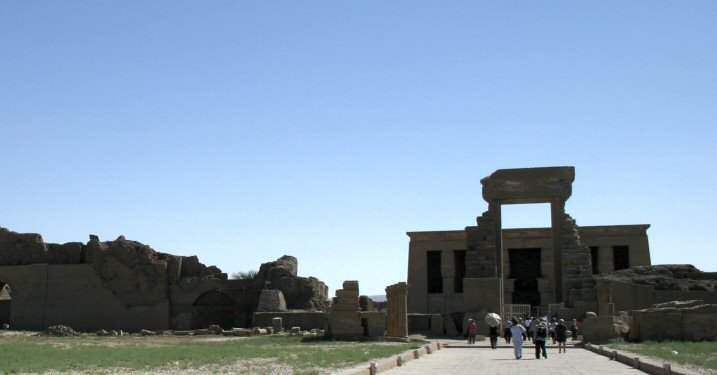
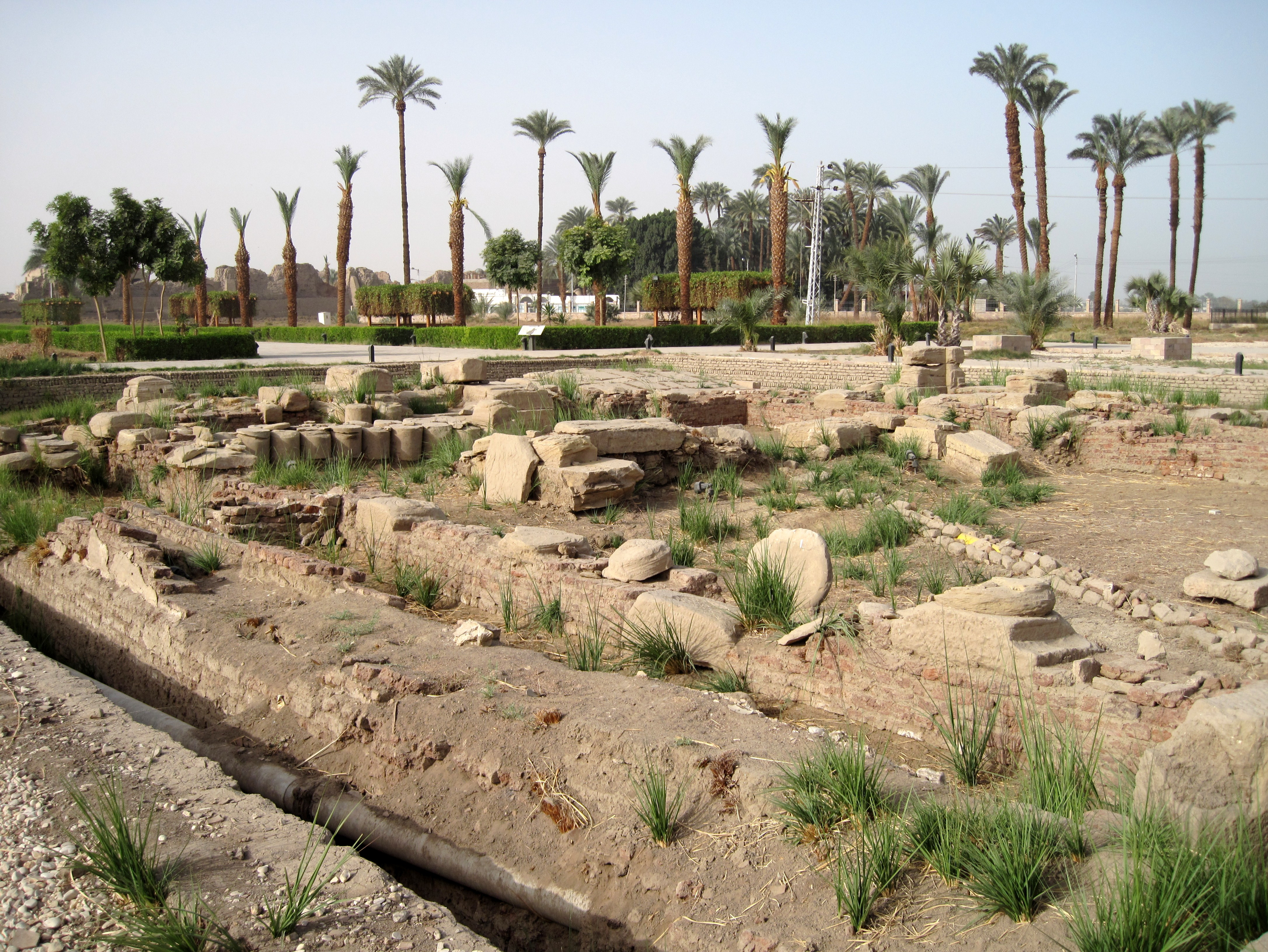
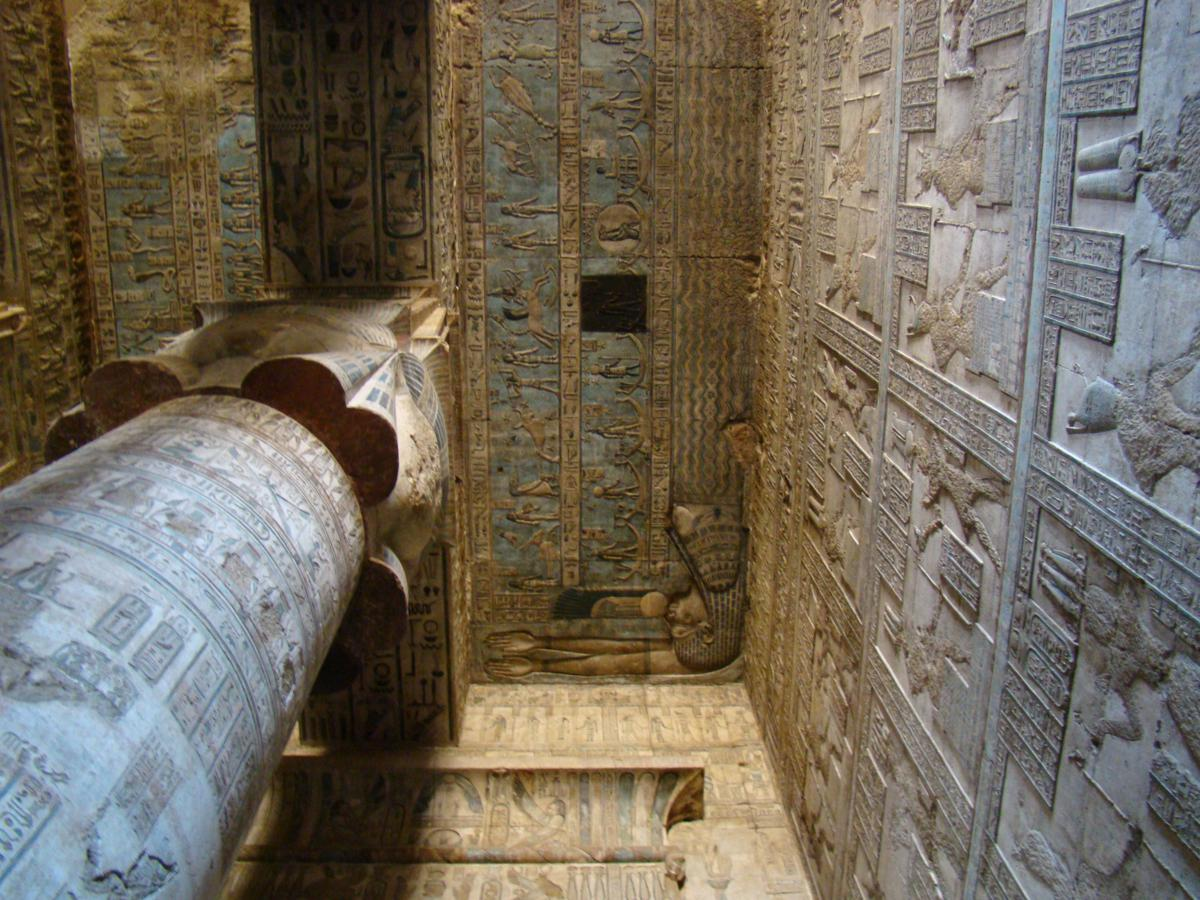
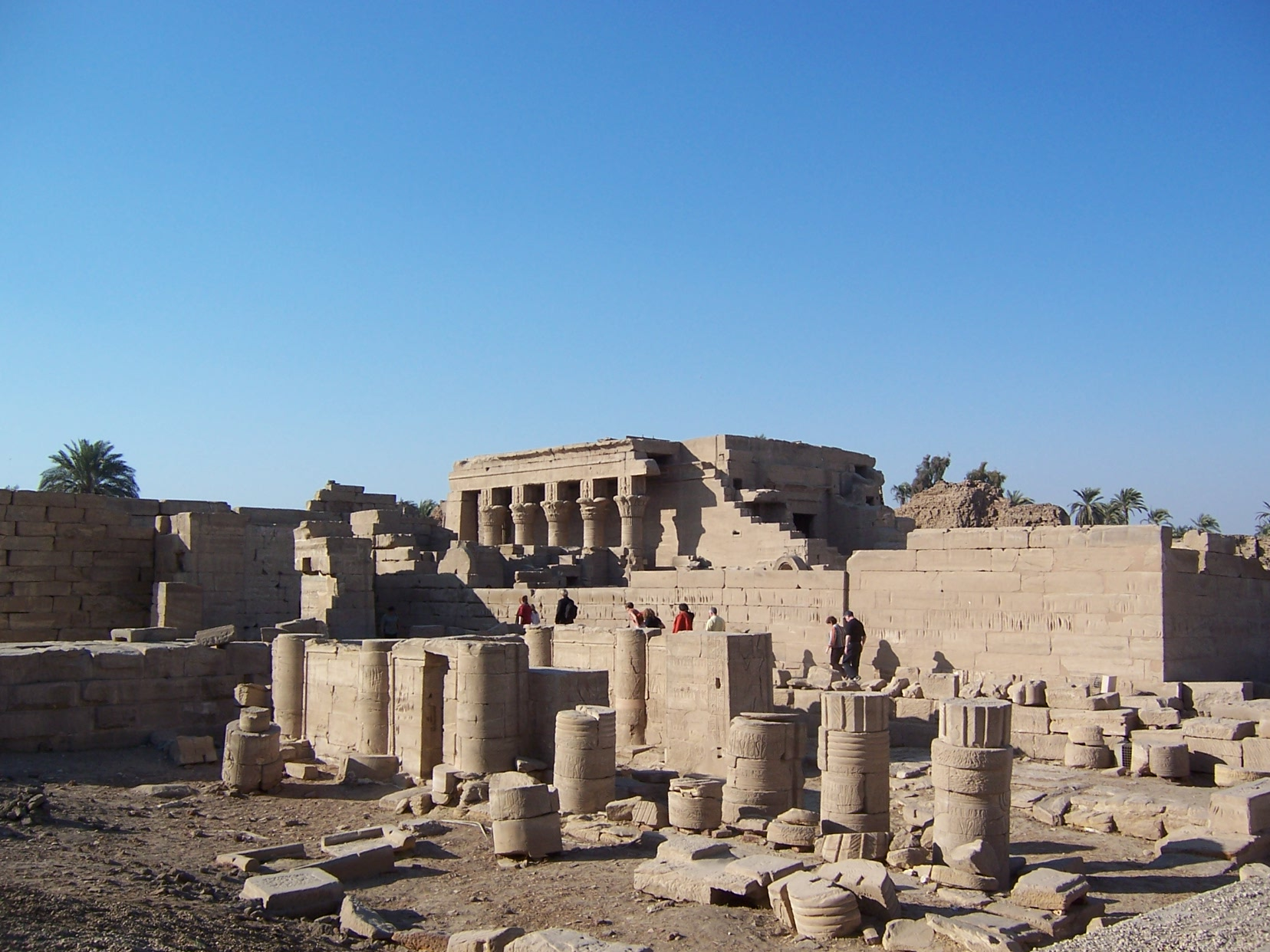
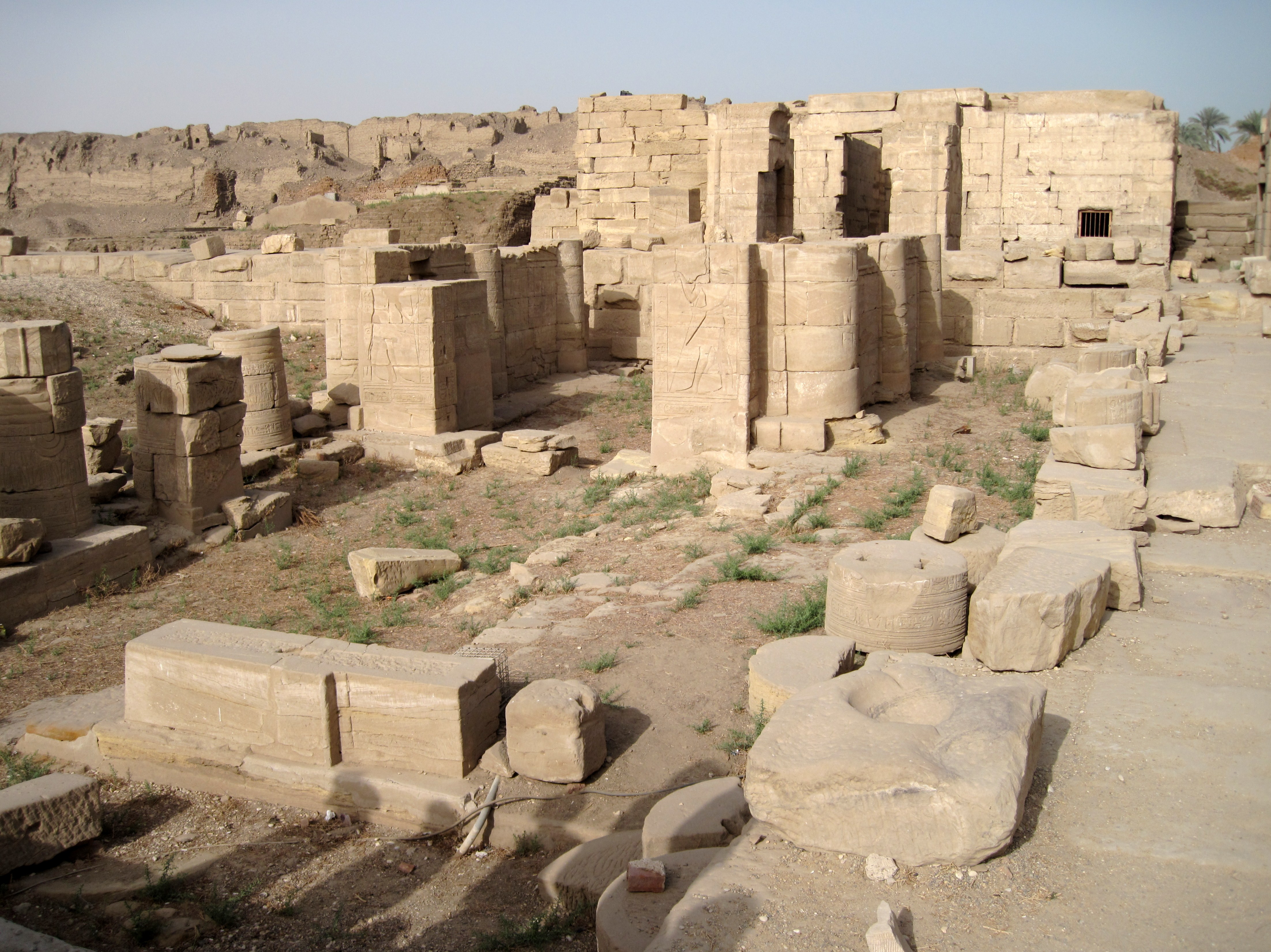
- Clockwise from top: Entrance to Dendera temple complex, Dendera Temple Complex, Inside Hathor Temple, Hathor Temple Complex

- Location in Egypt
- Coordinates: 26°10′05″N 32°39′22″E
- Country: Egypt
- Governorate: Qena
- Time zone: UTC+2 (EST)

Dendera (Egyptian Arabic: دَنْدَرة Dandarah; Ancient Greek: Τέντυρις or Τέντυρα; Bohairic Coptic: ⲛⲓⲧⲉⲛⲧⲱⲣⲓ, romanized: Nitentōri; Sahidic Coptic: ⲛⲓⲧⲛⲧⲱⲣⲉ, romanized: Nitntōre), also spelled Denderah, ancient Iunet 𓉺𓈖𓏏𓊖 “jwn.t”, Tentyris,(Arabic: Ewan-t إيوان-ة ), Tentyra, or Dandara, is a small town and former bishopric in Egypt situated on the west bank of the Nile, about 5 kilometres (3 mi) south of Qena, on the opposite side of the river. It is located approximately 60 kilometres (37 mi) north of Luxor and remains a Latin Catholic titular see. It contains the Dendera Temple complex, one of the best-preserved temple sites from ancient Upper Egypt.

In Ancient Egypt, Iunet (Dendera) was the capital of the Sixth Nome of Upper Egypt (Iqer). Sometimes its governor was the head of all of Upper Egypt, like Idu I who served in the late 6th dynasty.

== Etymology ==
iwn n t niwt
jwnt
in hieroglyphs
Era: Old Kingdom
(2686–2181 BC)

tA n tA r r t niwt or xpr N21 n tA Z1 N23 r r t niwt
t3 n t3 rr(t)
in hieroglyphs
Era: Ptolemaic dynasty
(305–30 BC)

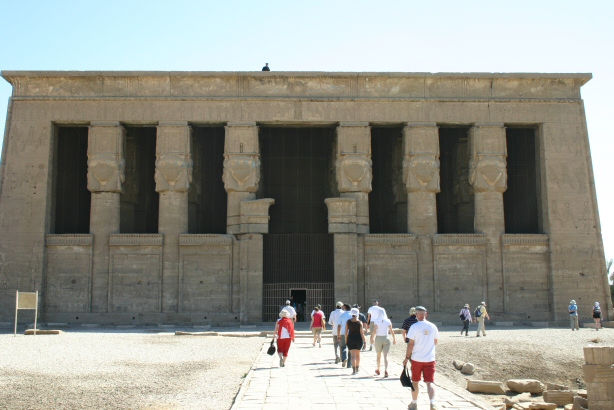
Entrance to the temple.

The original name of the town is Ancient Egyptian: ı͗wnt, the etymology of which is unknown. It was later complemented by the name of the chief goddess Hathor and became Egyptian Ancient Egyptian: ı͗wnt-tꜣ-ntrt, lit. 'ı͗wnt of the goddess' which is the source of Coptic: ⲛⲓⲧⲉⲛⲧⲱⲣⲓ, romanized: Nitentōri or just tꜣ-ntrt "of the goddess", which is the source of Koine Greek: Τεντυρις. The modern Arabic name of the town comes from either its Greek or Coptic name.

There is also an aberrant Coptic form ⲛⲓⲕⲉⲛⲧⲱⲣⲓ, which could be either dissimilation of a regular name or a confusion with Koine Κένταυροι.

== Temple complex ==
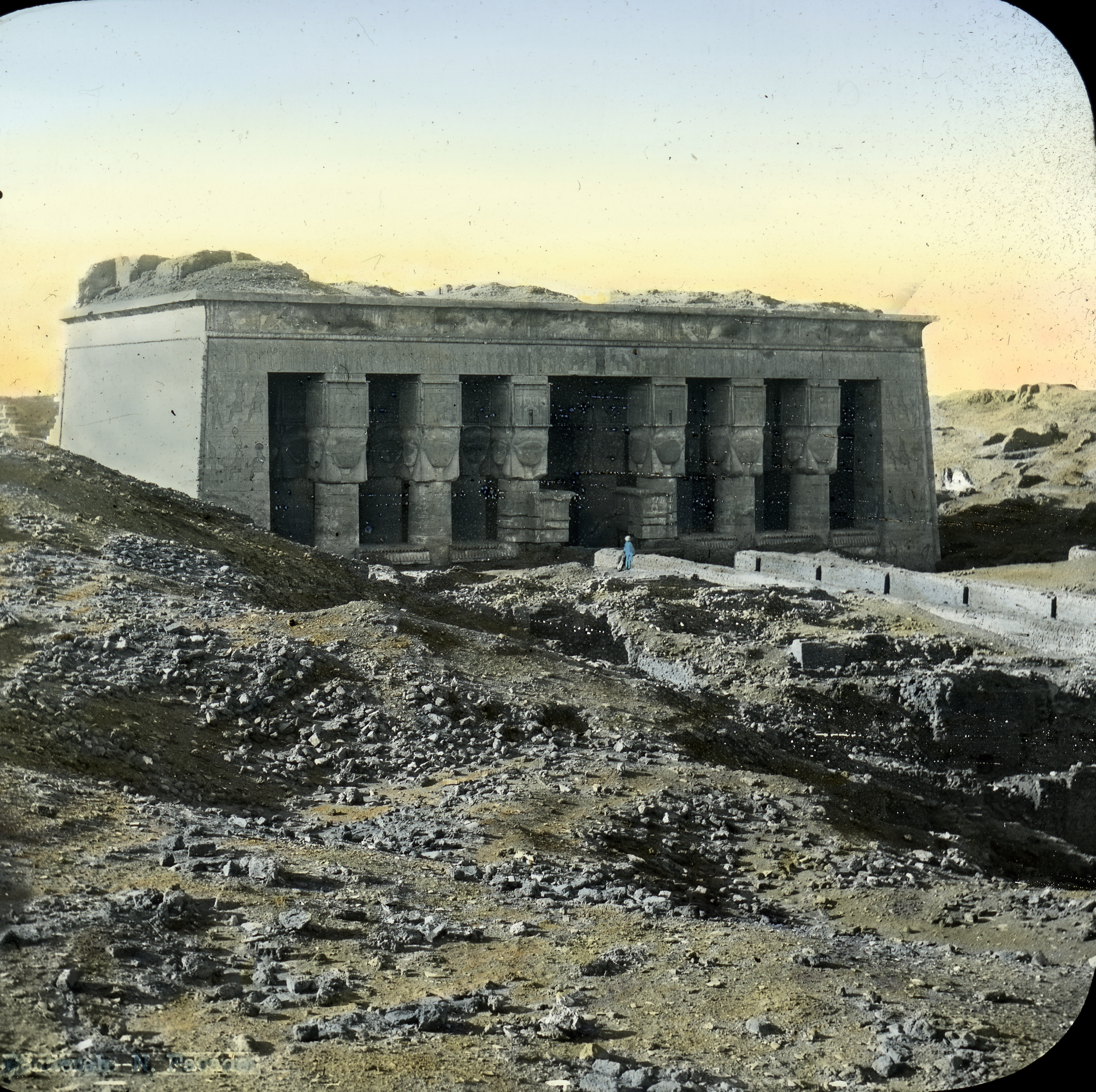
Egypt – Denderah

The Dendera Temple complex, which contains the Temple of Hathor, is one of the best-preserved temples, if not the best-preserved one, in all of Upper Egypt. The whole complex covers some 40,000 square meters and is surrounded by a hefty mud brick wall. The present Temple of Hathor dates back to July 54 BC, at the time of Ptolemy XII of the Ptolemaic dynasty, and was completed by the Roman emperor Tiberius, but it rests on the foundations of earlier buildings dating back at least as far as Khufu (known as the Great Pyramid builder Cheops, the second Pharaoh of the 4th dynasty [c. 2613–c. 2494 BC]) but it was the pharaoh Pepi I Meryre who built the temple.

It was once home to the celebrated Dendera zodiac, which is now displayed in the Louvre Museum in Paris. There are also Roman and pharaonic Mammisi (birth houses), ruins of a Coptic church and a small chapel dedicated to Isis, dating to the Roman or the Ptolemaic epoch.

In the vicinity of the temple complex a bakery dated to the First Intermediate Period was discovered by the French-Polish expedition from the Institut français d’archéologie orientale (IFAO) and the Polish Centre of Mediterranean Archaeology, University of Warsaw. Bread offered to Hathor was baked here. The team also excavated the so-called Eastern Temple in this area.

The area around the temple has been extensively landscaped and now has a modern visitor centre, bazaar and small cafeteria.

== Ecclesiastical history ==
After Egypt became a Roman possession, the city of Tentyris was part of the Late Roman province of Thebais Secunda. Its bishopric was a suffragan of Ptolemais Hermiou, the capital and metropolitan see of the province. Little is known of the history of Christianity in the place, as only the names of two ancient bishops are given:

- Pachomius the Great, generally recognized as the founder of Christian cenobitic monasticism
- Serapion or Aprion, a contemporary and friend of the monk Pachomius, whose diocese boasted the celebrated convent of Tabenna.

The town was given its present Arabic name of Denderah during the late Ottoman Empire and ruled 6000 inhabitants in Qena (Qeneh) district.

=== Titular see ===
Under the Latin name Tentyris, the episcopal see was nominally revived as a titular bishopric (in Curiate Italian repeatedly renamed) since 1902, but is vacant since 1972, having had the following incumbents of the fitting episcopal (lowest) rank :

- Matteo Gaughren, Missionary Oblates of Mary Immaculate (O.M.I.) (1902.01.13 – 1914.05.30)
- Emile-Marie Bunoz, O.M.I. (1917.06.13 – 1945.06.03)
- André van den Bronk, Society of African Missions (S.M.A.) (1946.07.30 – 1952.05.15)
- Teodoro Bensch (1956.12.01 – 1958.01.07)
- Jean-Rosière-Eugène Arnaud, Paris Foreign Missions Society (M.E.P.) (1958.03.02 – 1972.09.11).

== Climate ==
This area has a large amount of sunshine year round due to its stable descending air and high pressure. According to the Köppen climate classification system, Dendera has a hot desert climate, abbreviated "BWh" on climate maps.

== Sponsors ==
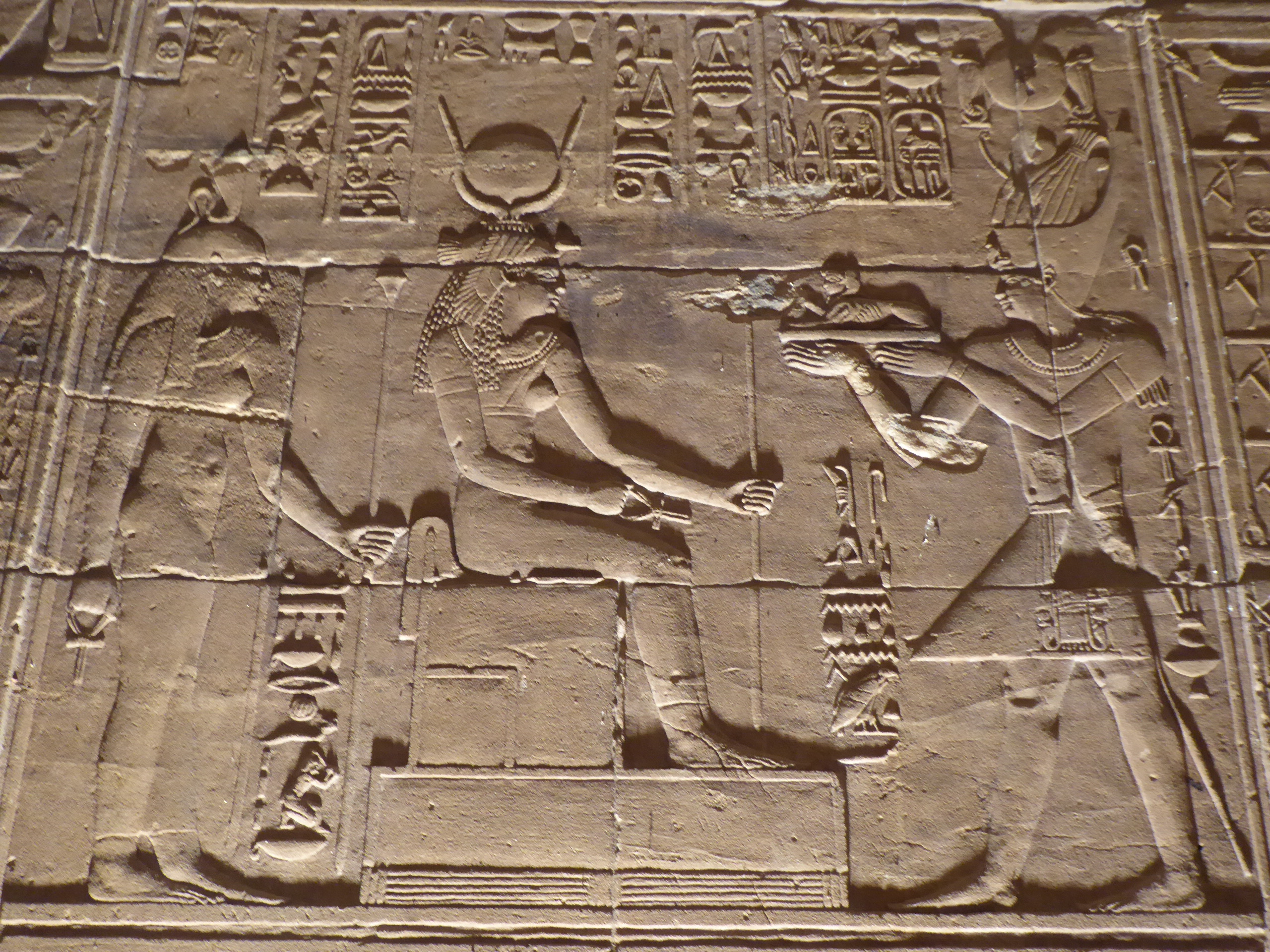
Ptolemy XII Auletes before Hathor and Isis (at Philae). Construction at Dendera began in 54 BC, under this Ptolemy.

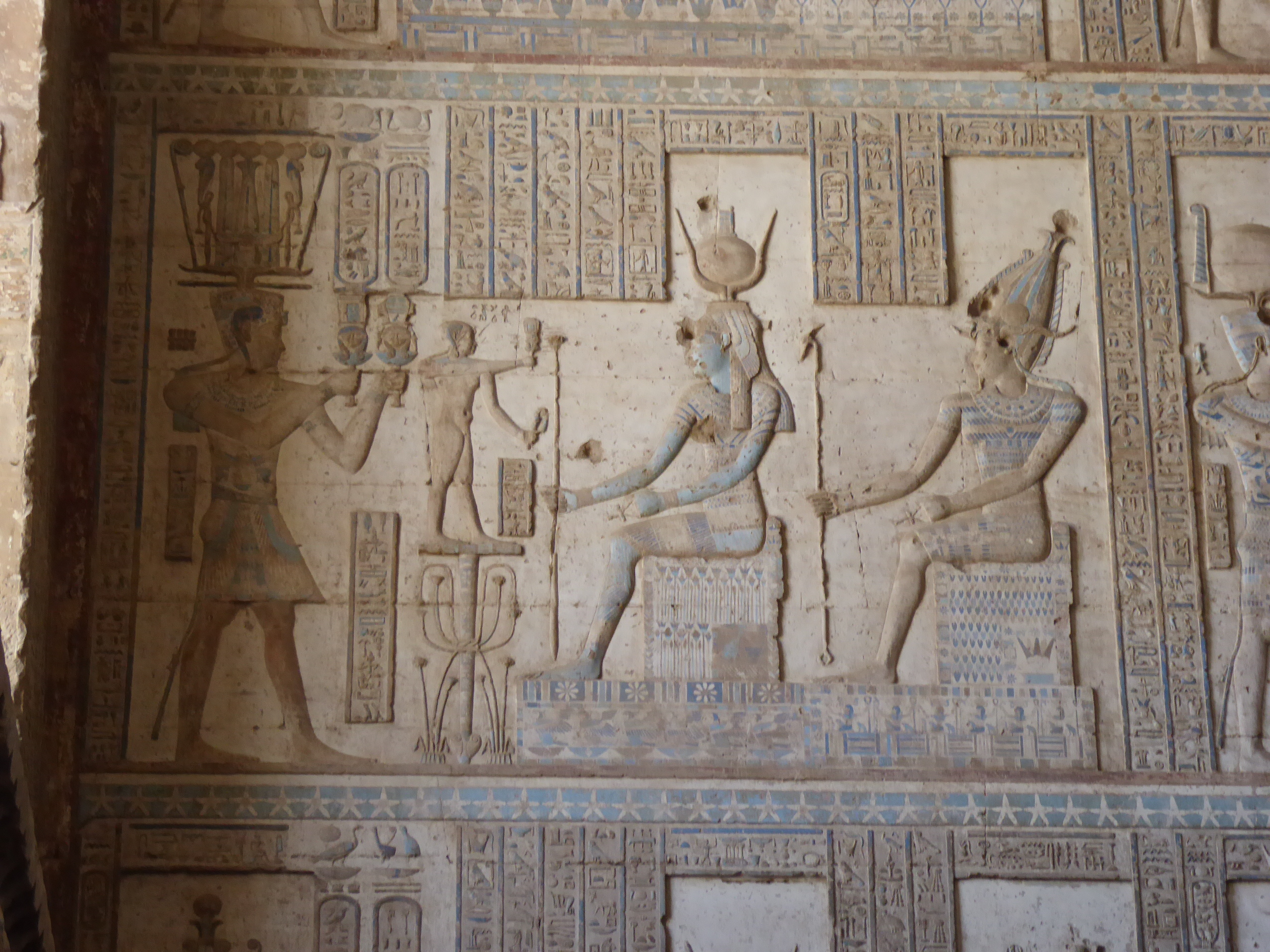
Ptolemy XII before Isis and Osiris, at the Hathor Temple, Dendera.

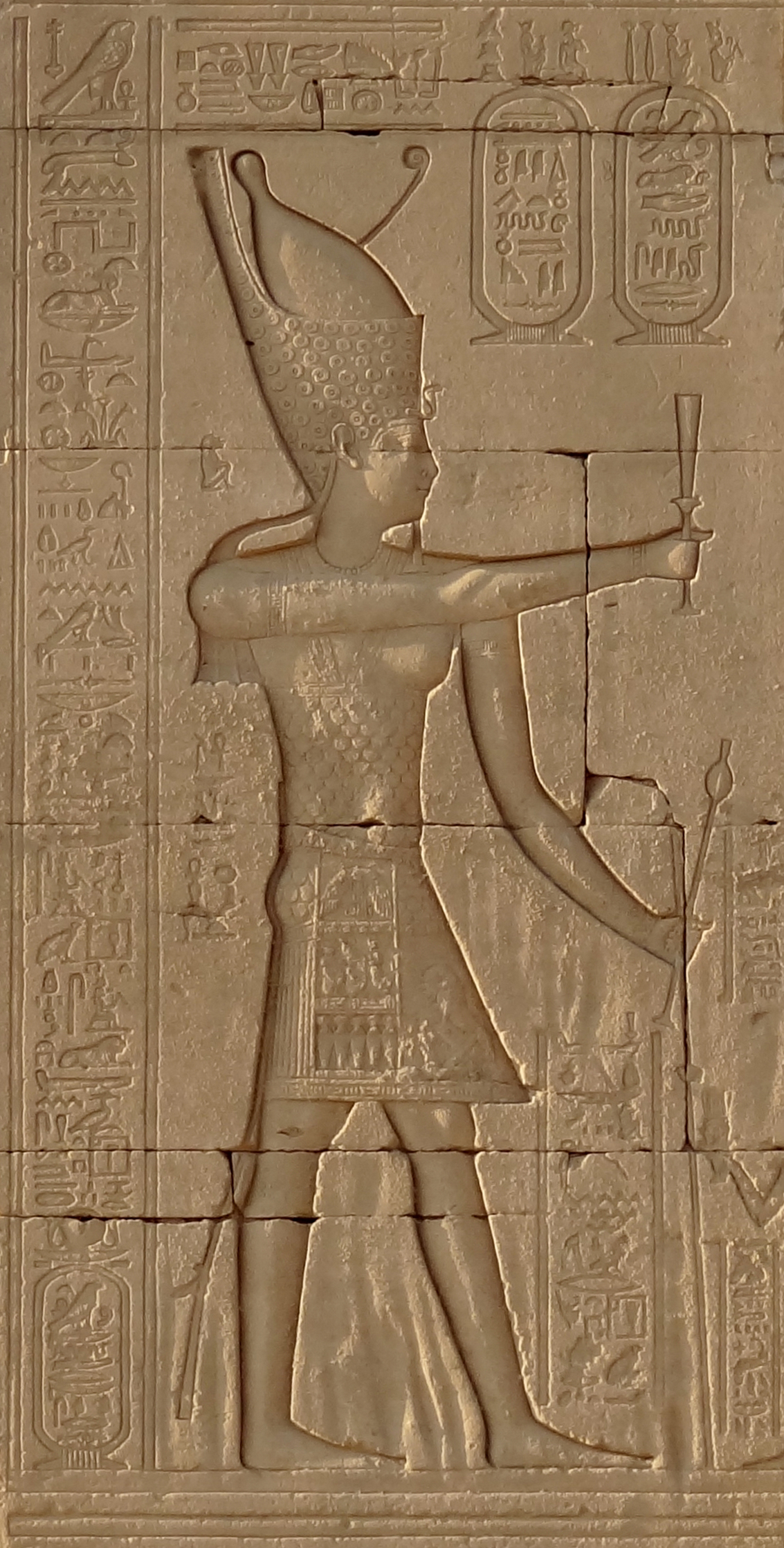
Roman Emperor Domitian on the northern gate of the Temple of Hathor.

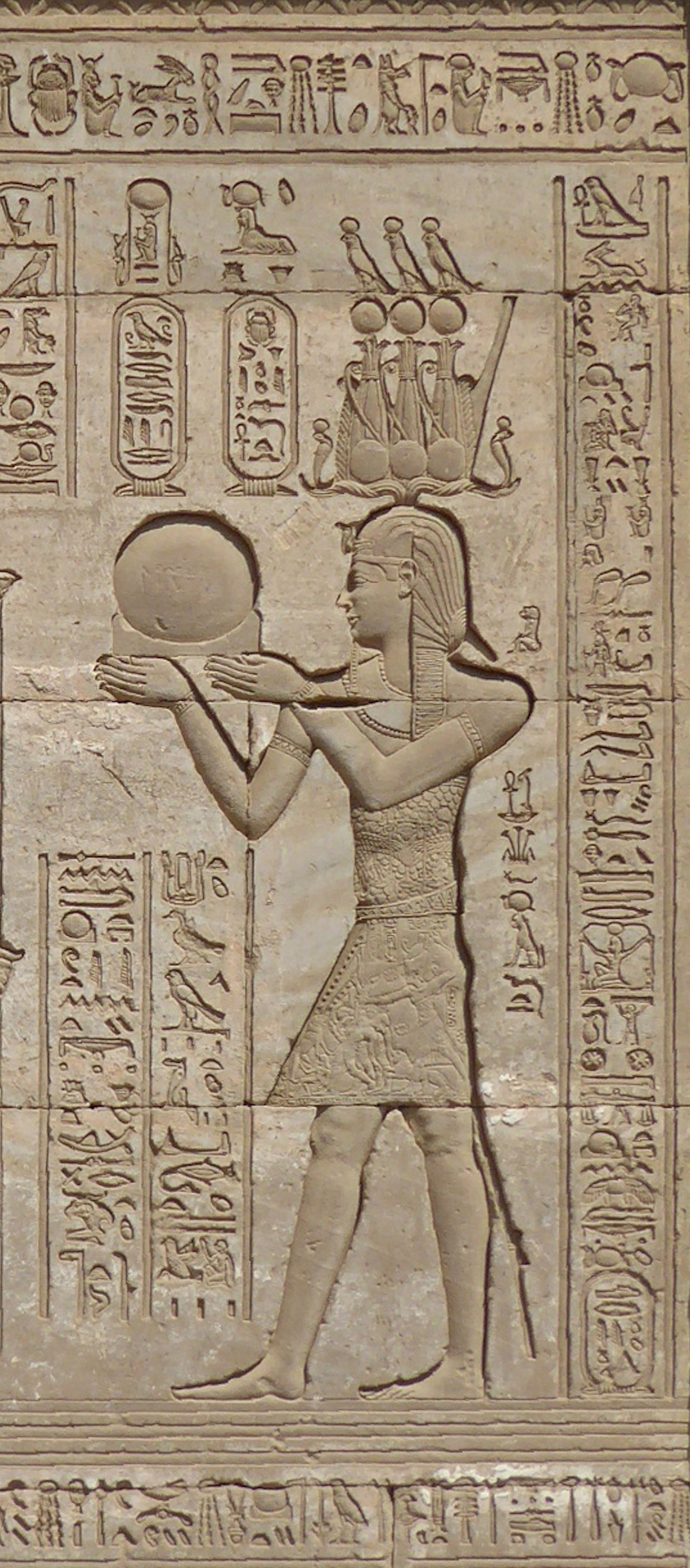
Roman Emperor Trajan at Dendera.

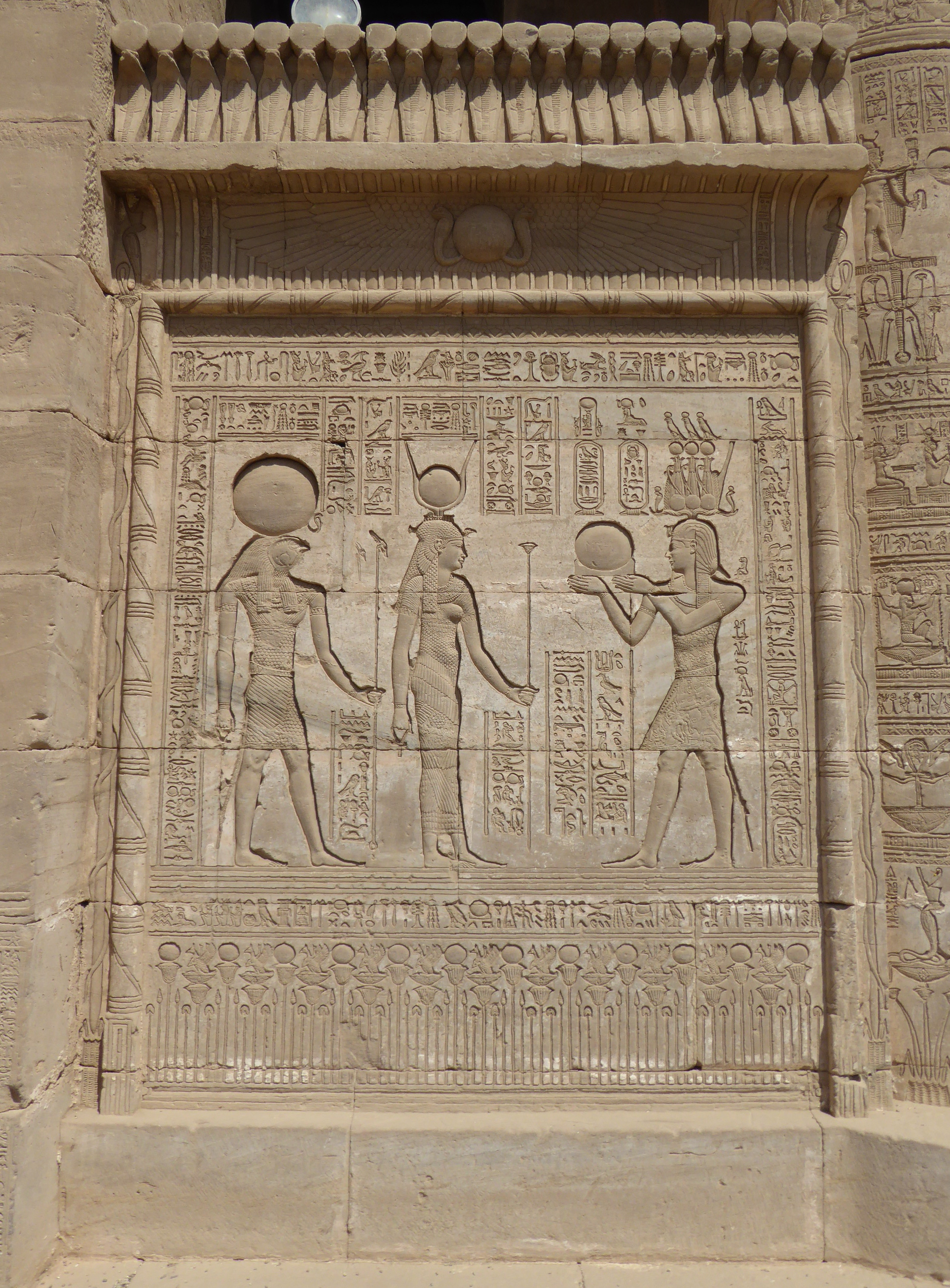
Roman Emperor Trajan offers to Hathor and Ra-Harakhte, Dendera.

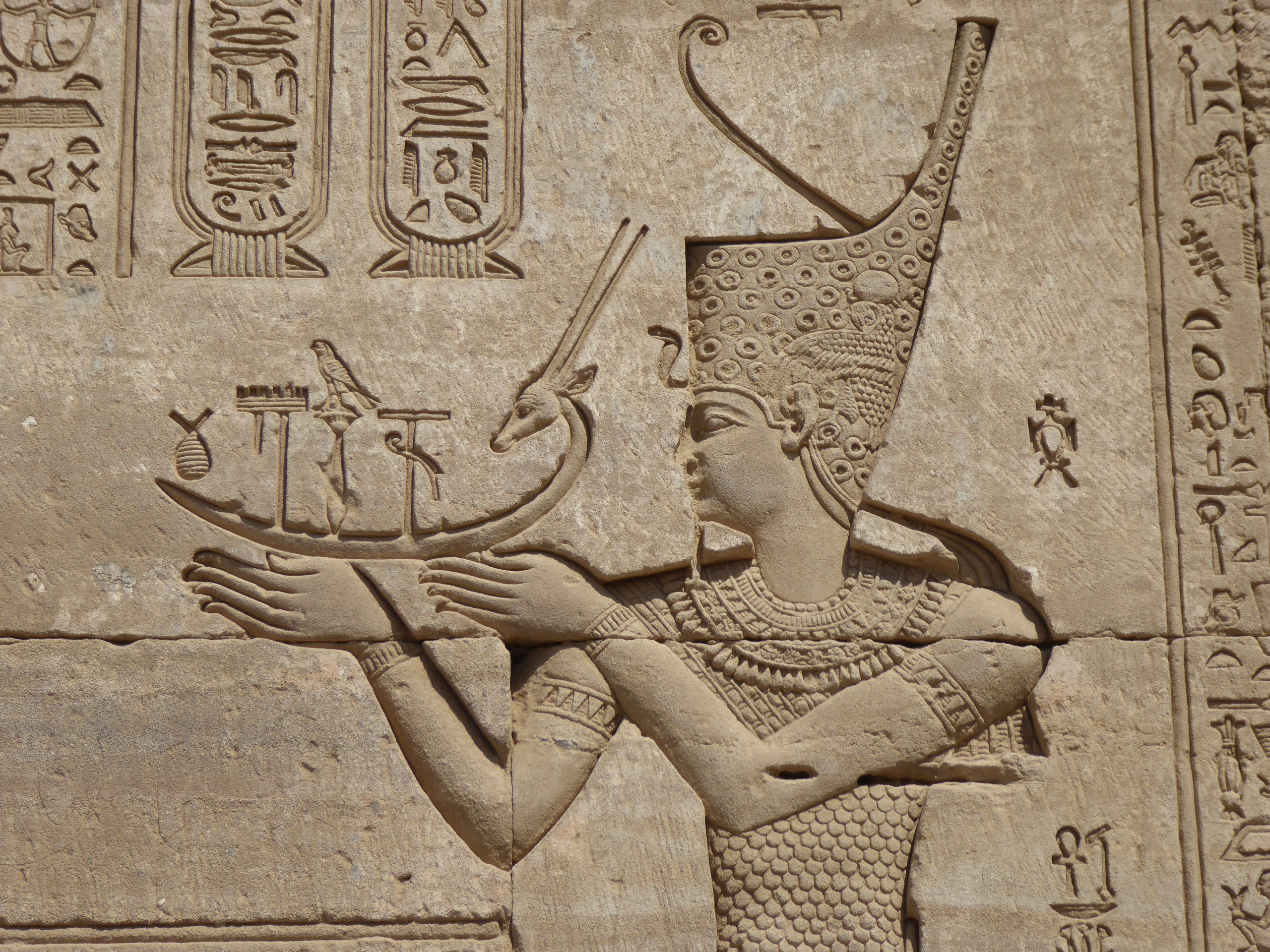
Emperor Trajan as a Pharaoh making an offering to the Gods, in Dendera.

== Monuments ==
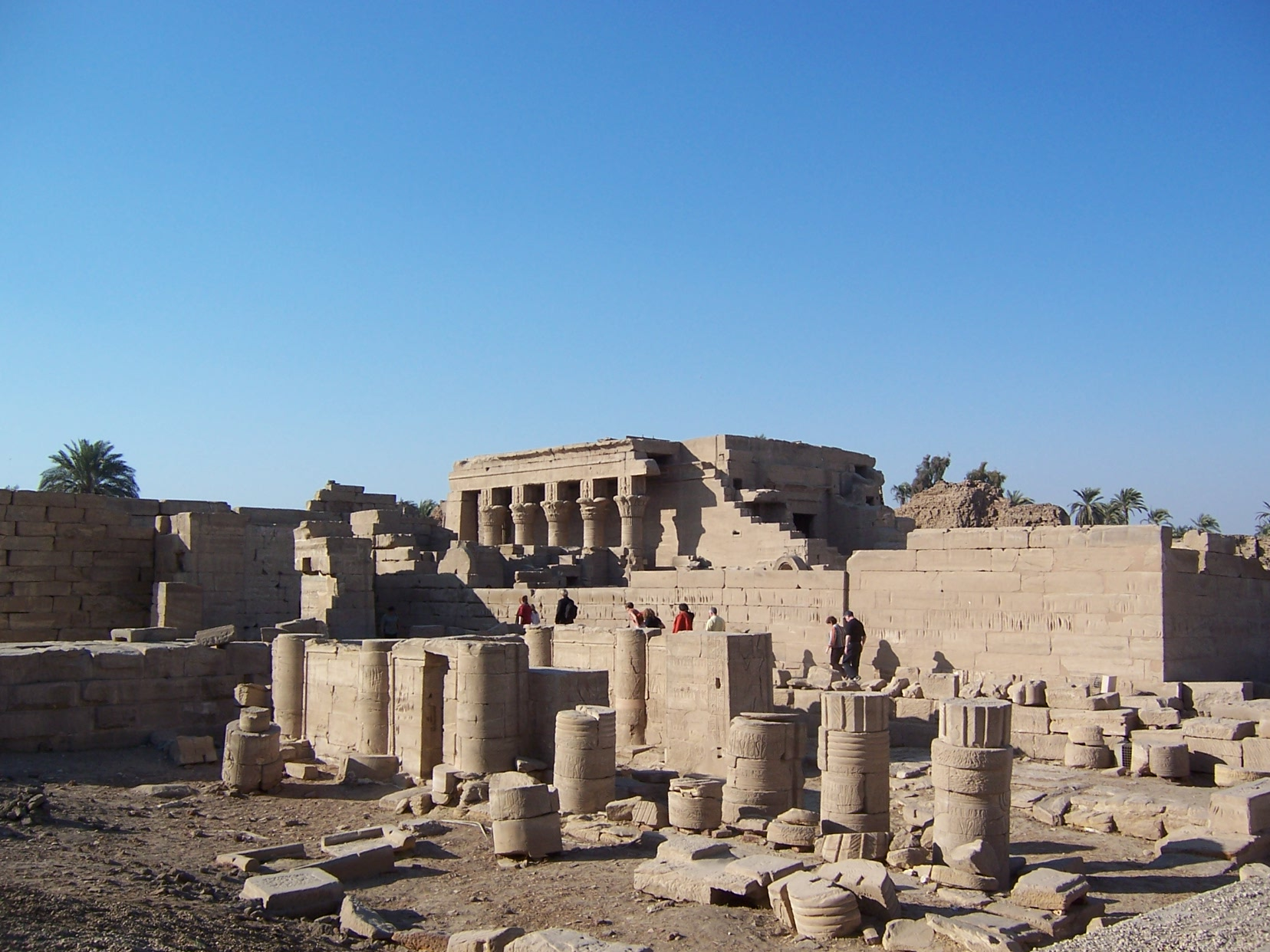
The temple complex.

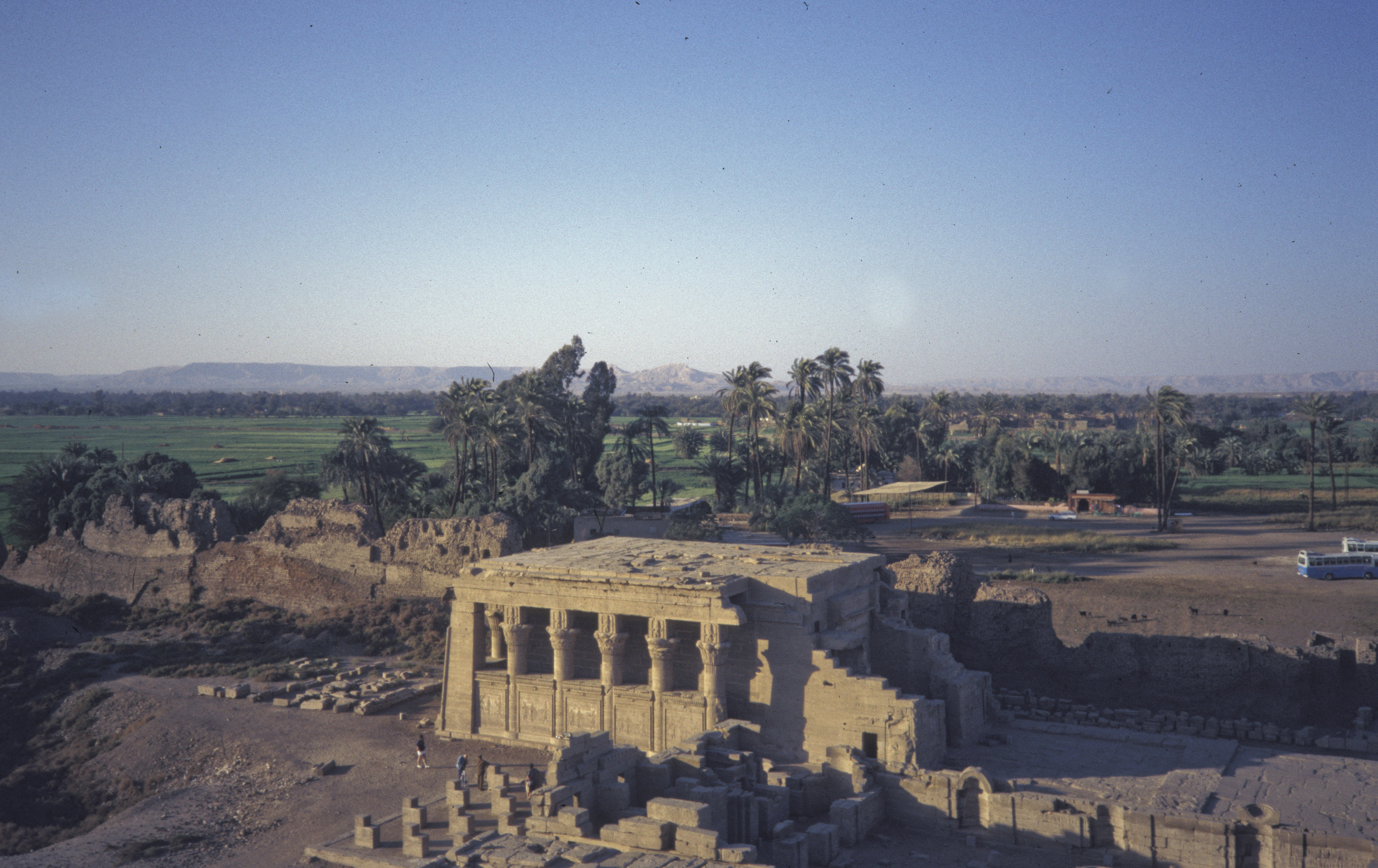
The Temple of Hathor.

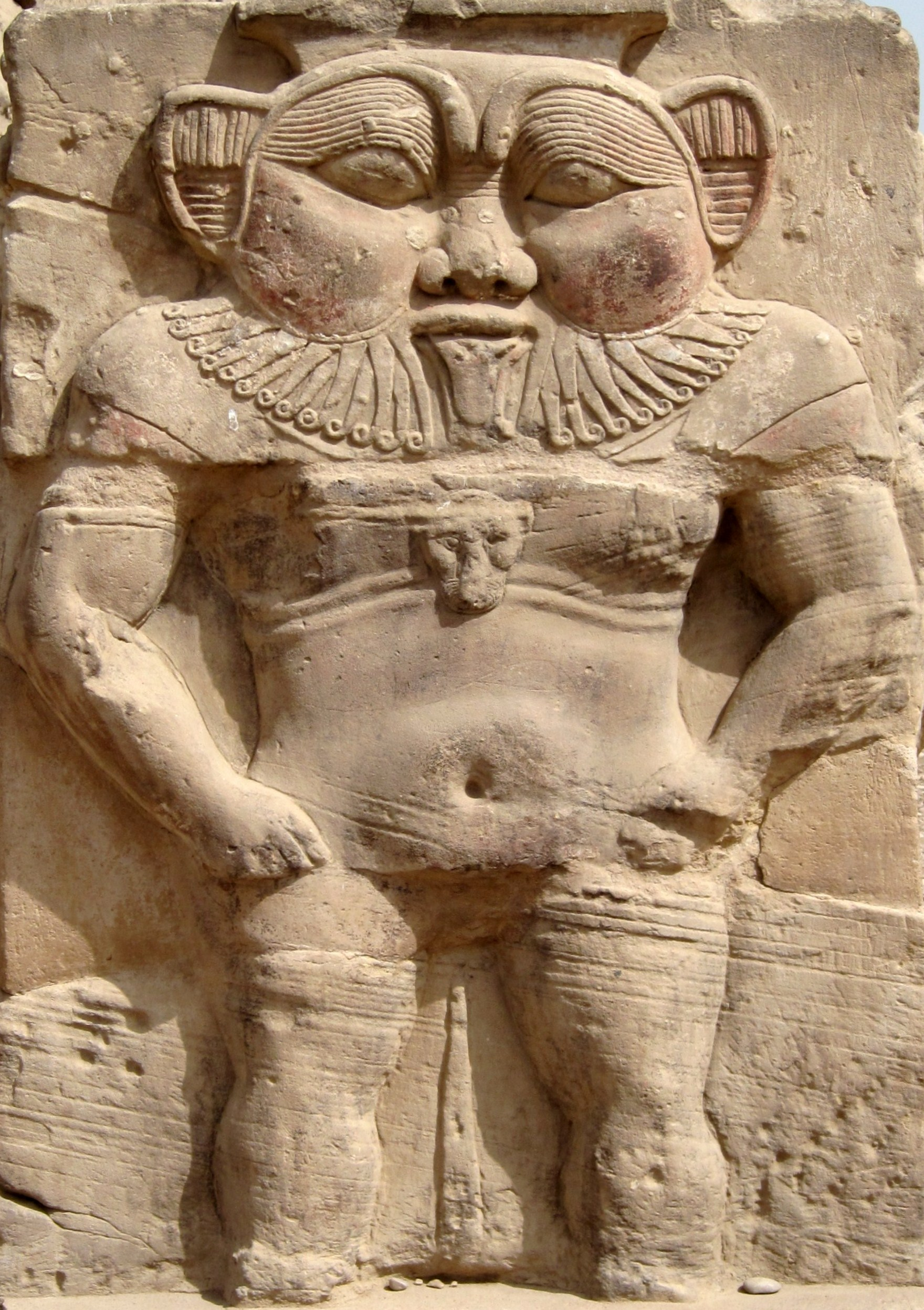
Relief of Bes in the Hathor Temple courtyard.

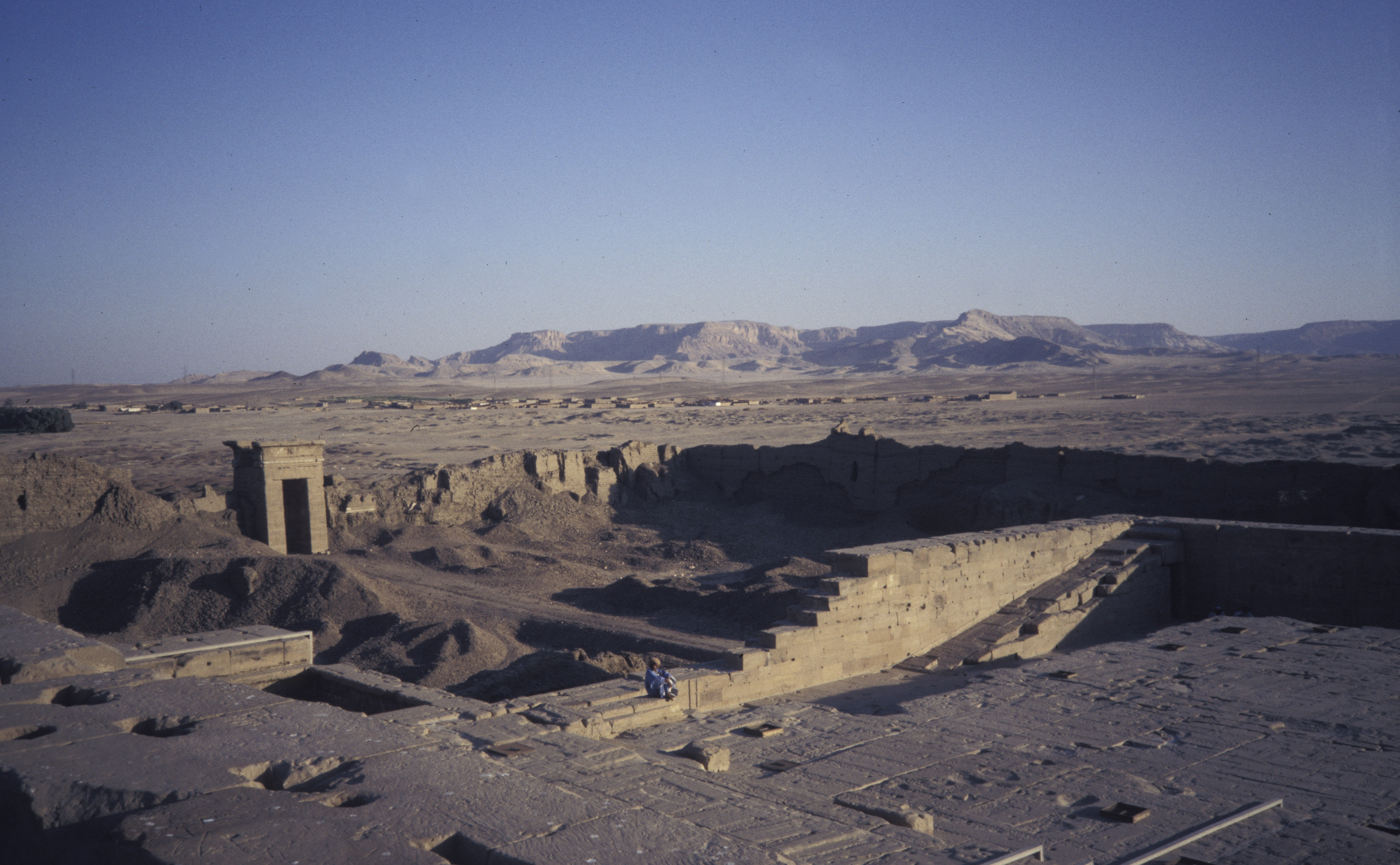
Domitian's Monumental Gate, a later Roman addition, as seen from afar.

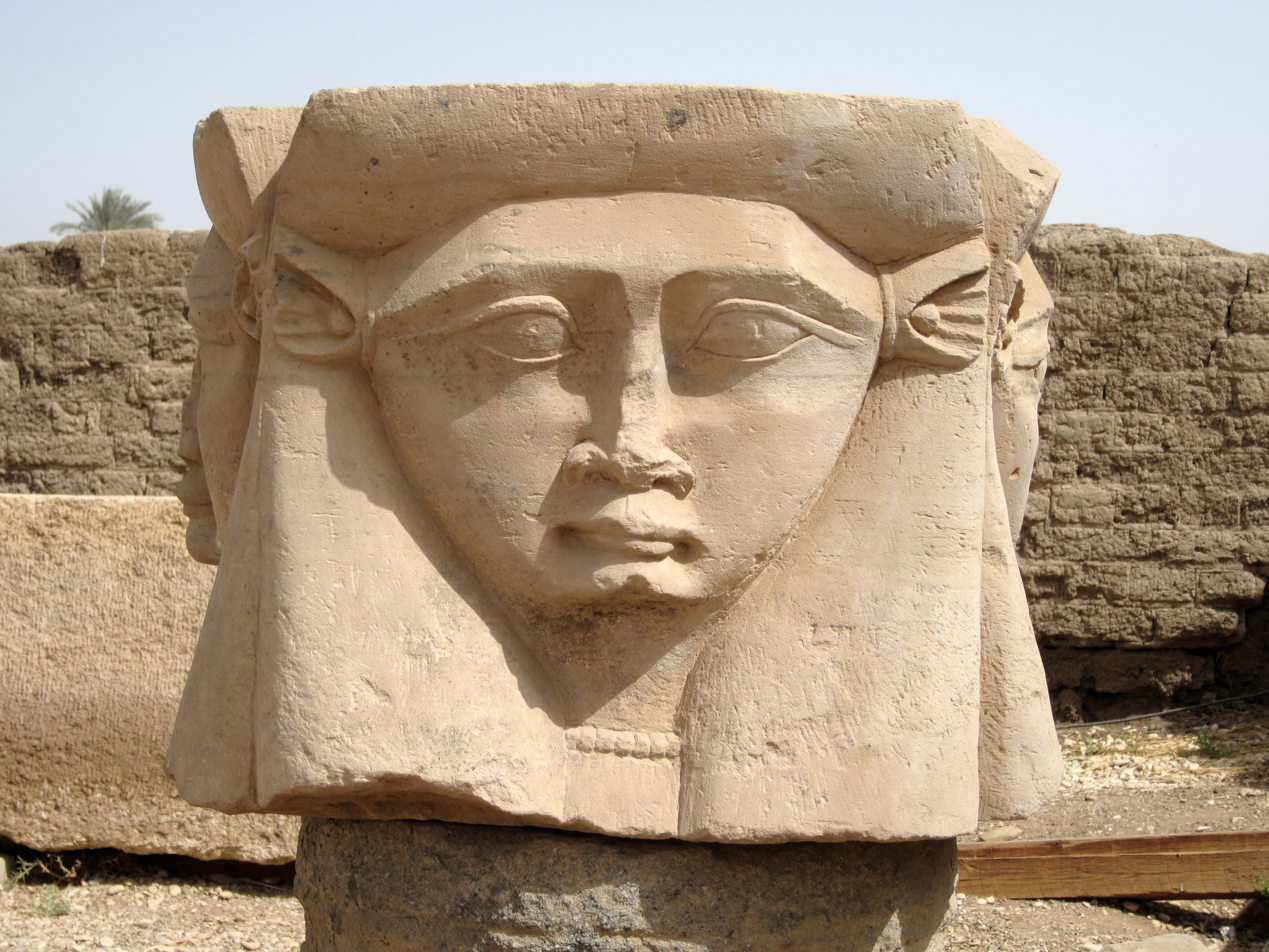
Portrait relief of Hathor. The bovine goddesses Hathor and Bat are conventionally depicted in full face, as seen here, even though most gods, goddesses, and humans are conventionally depicted in profile.

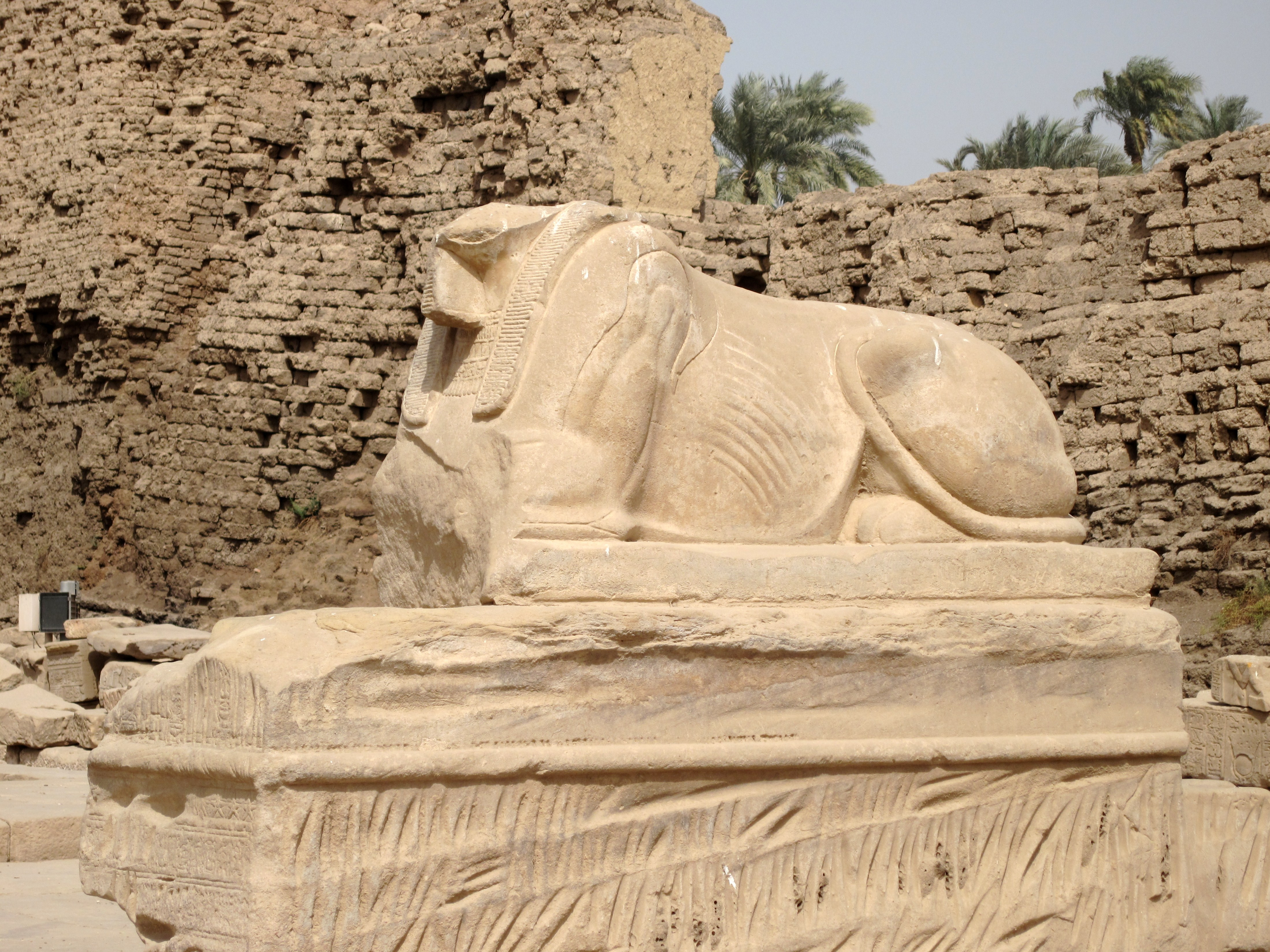

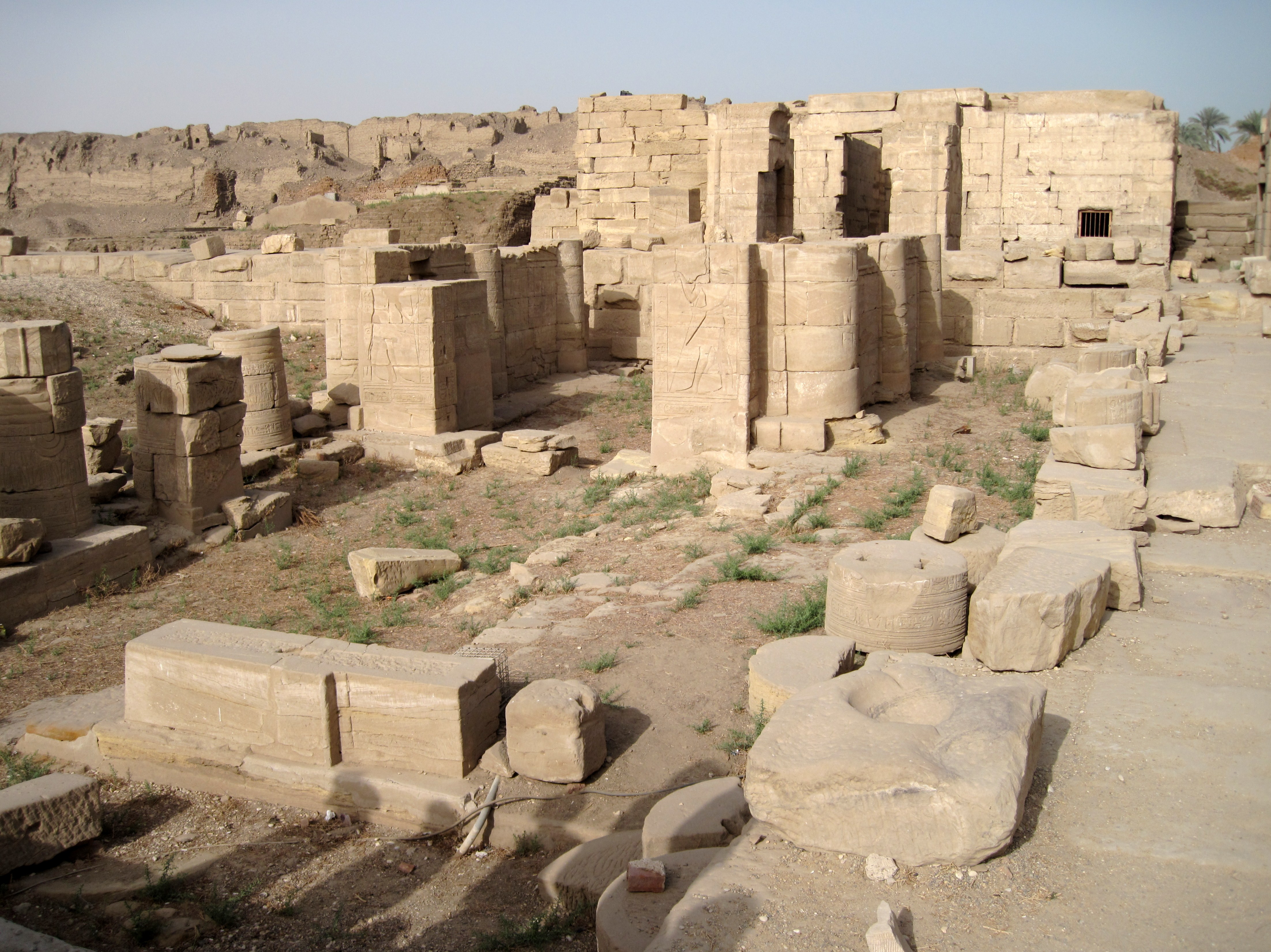

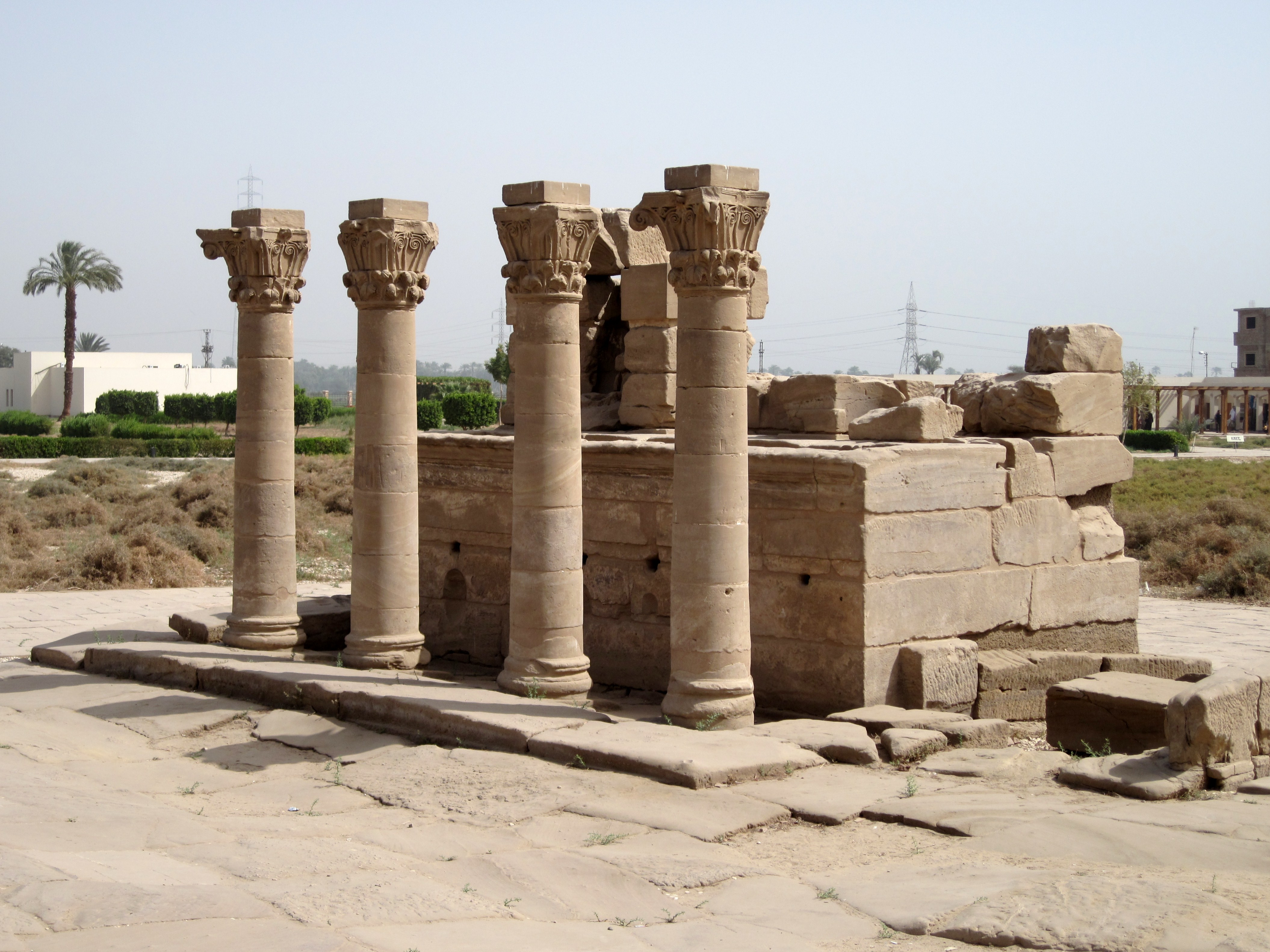

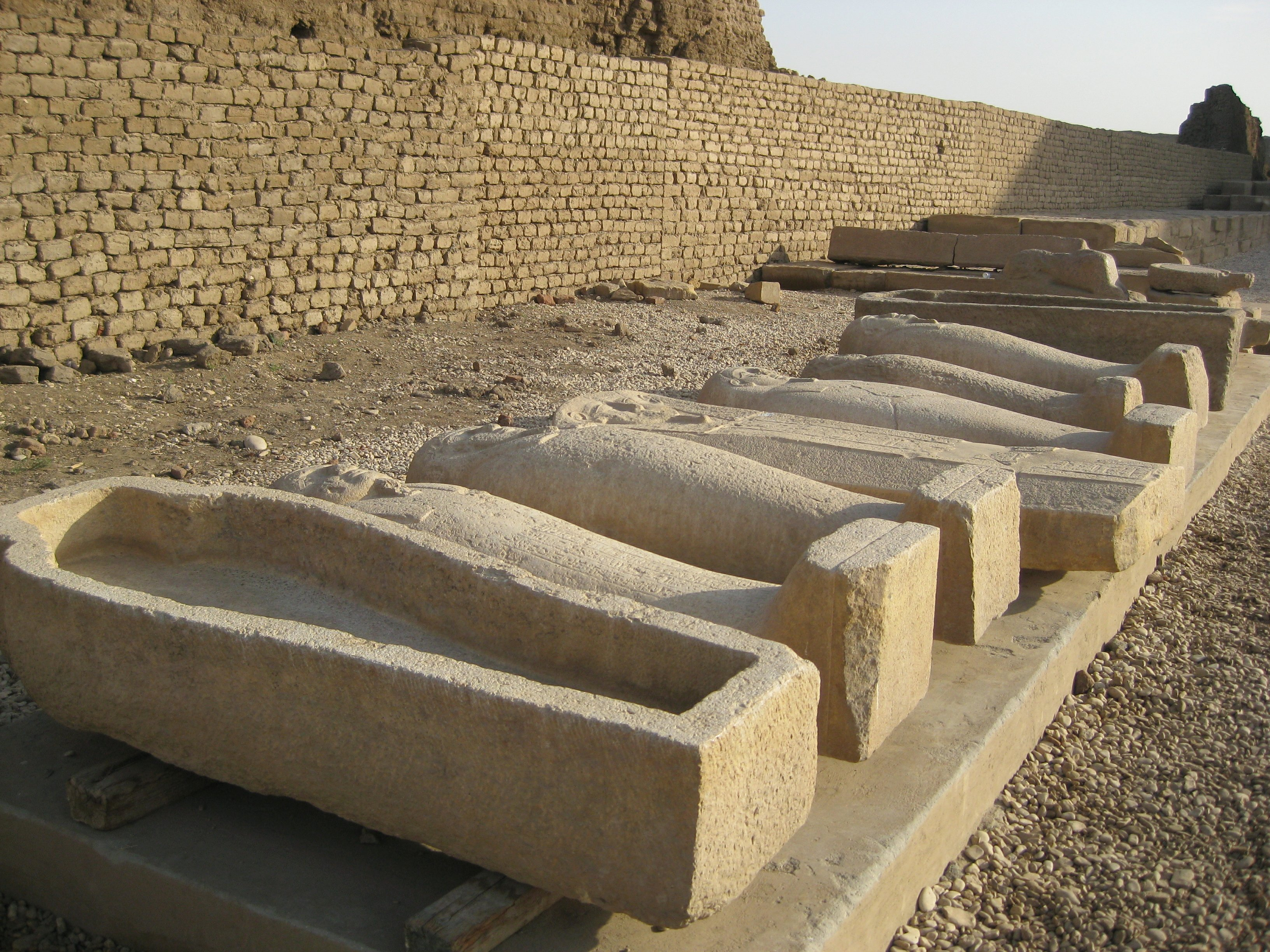

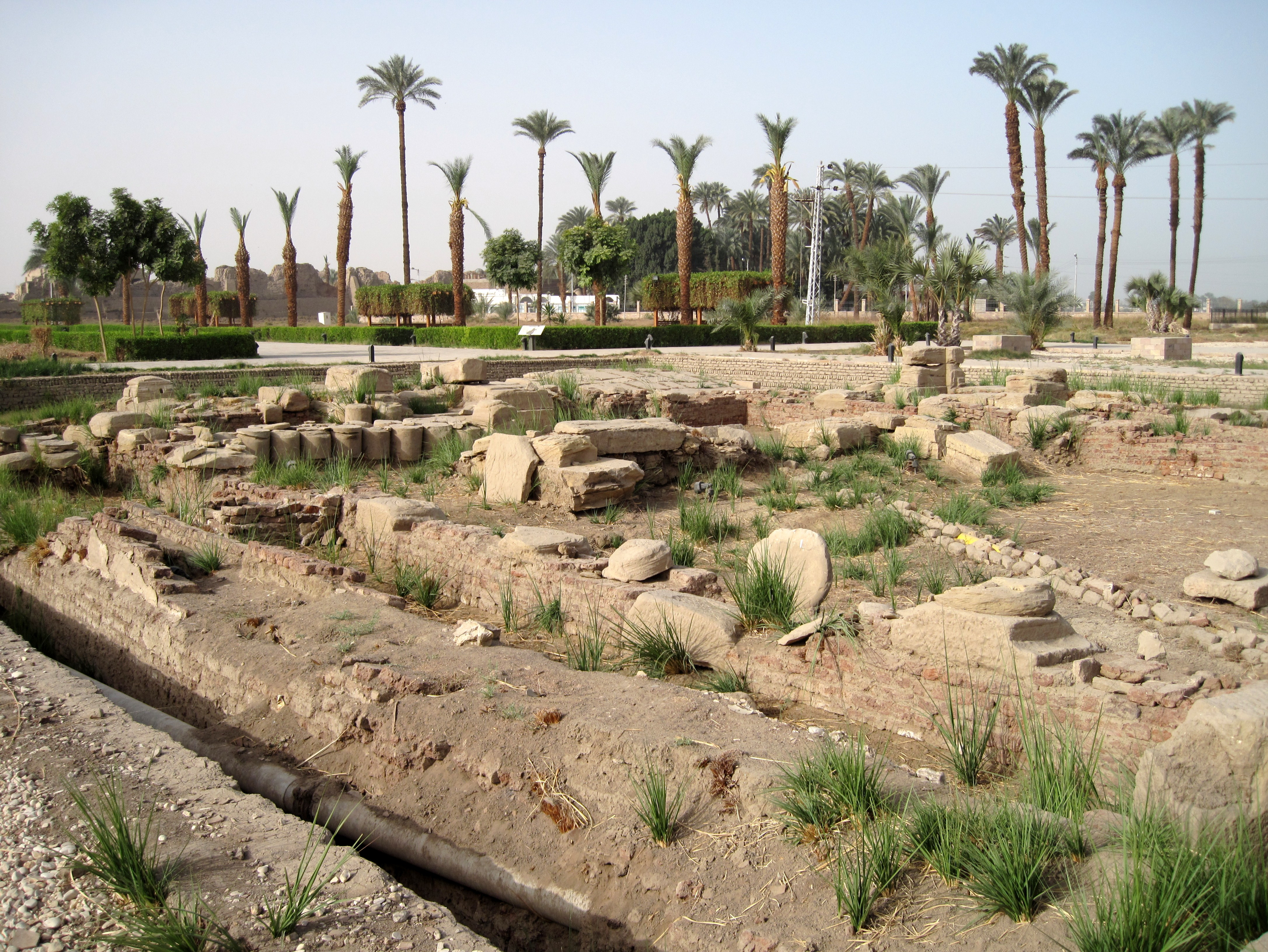

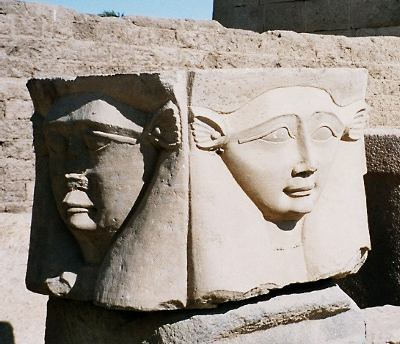

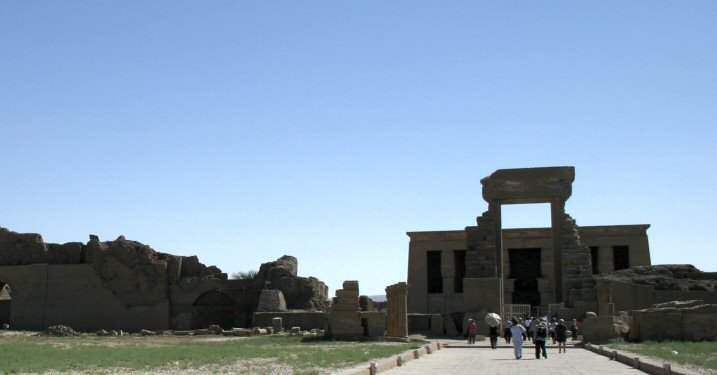

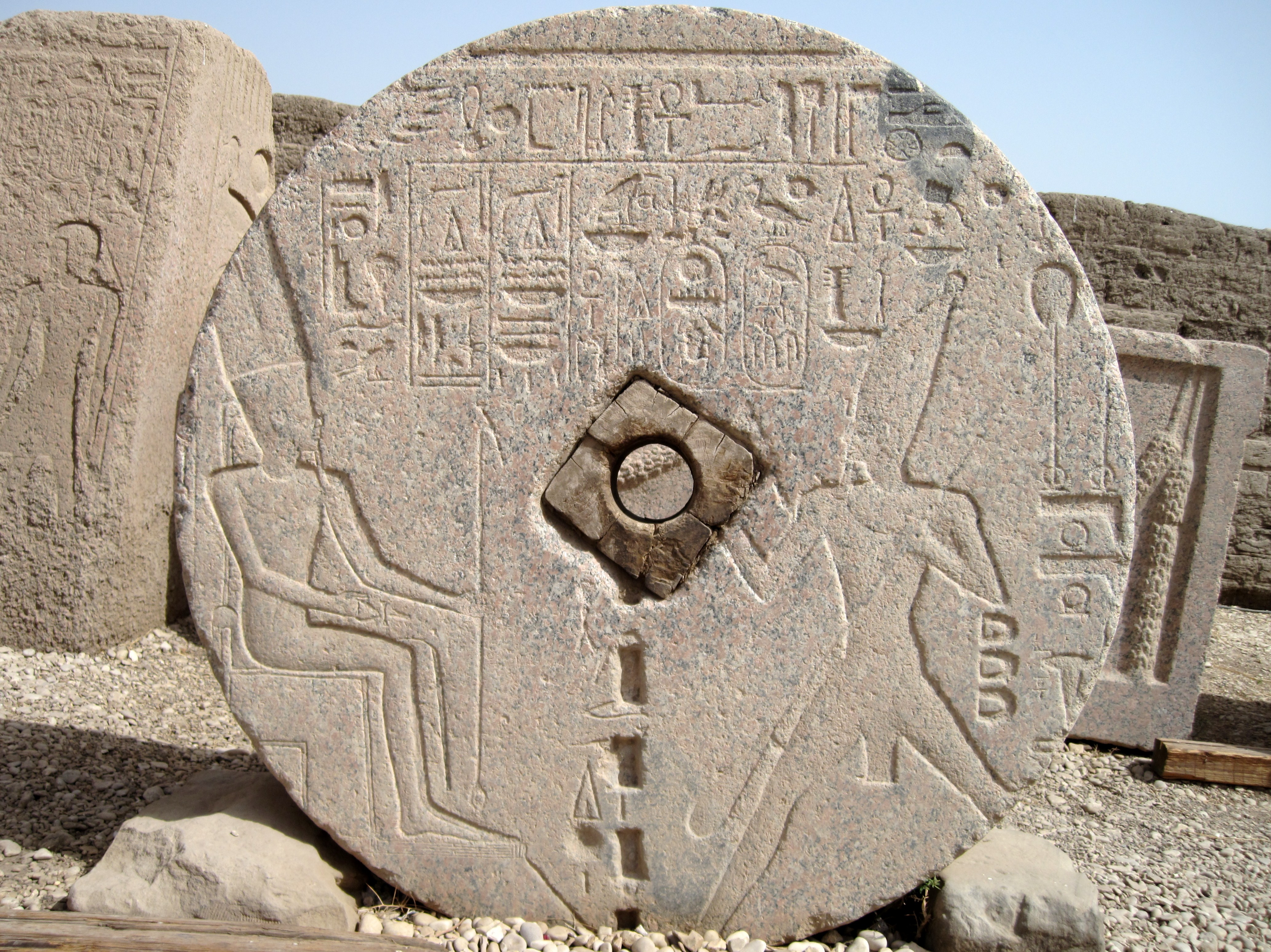

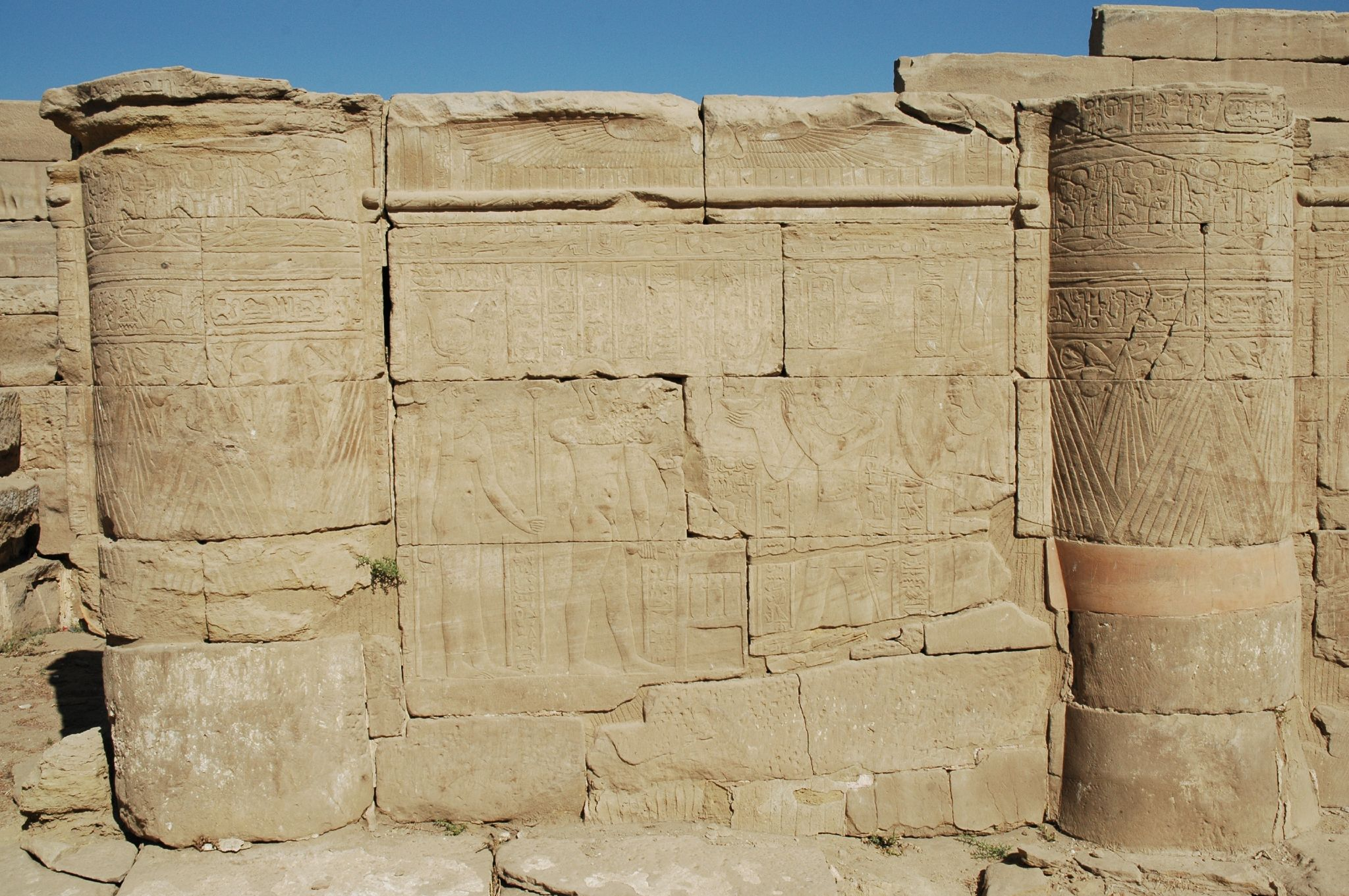

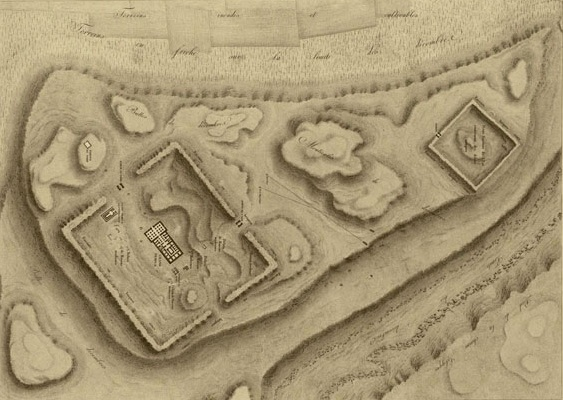

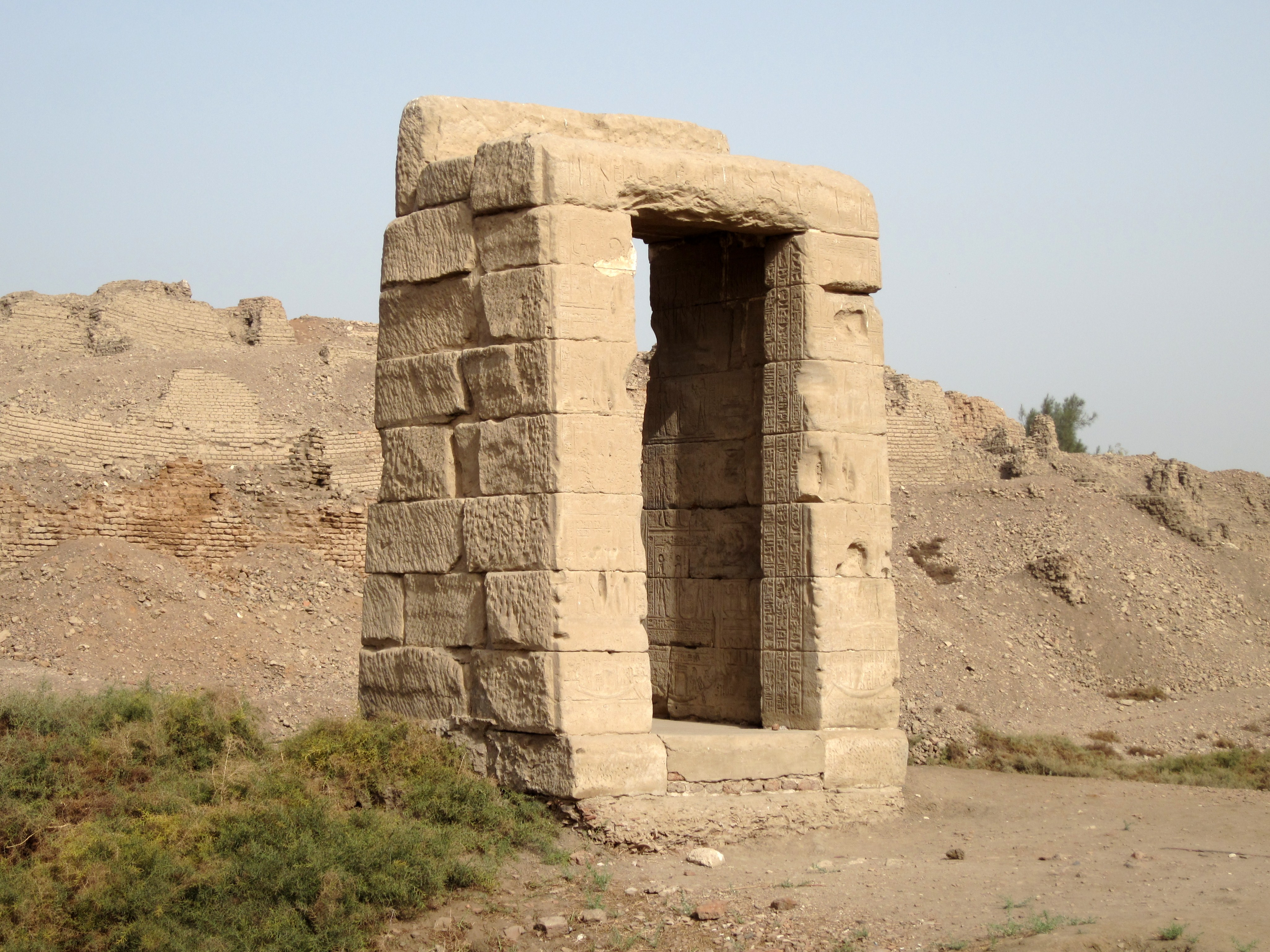

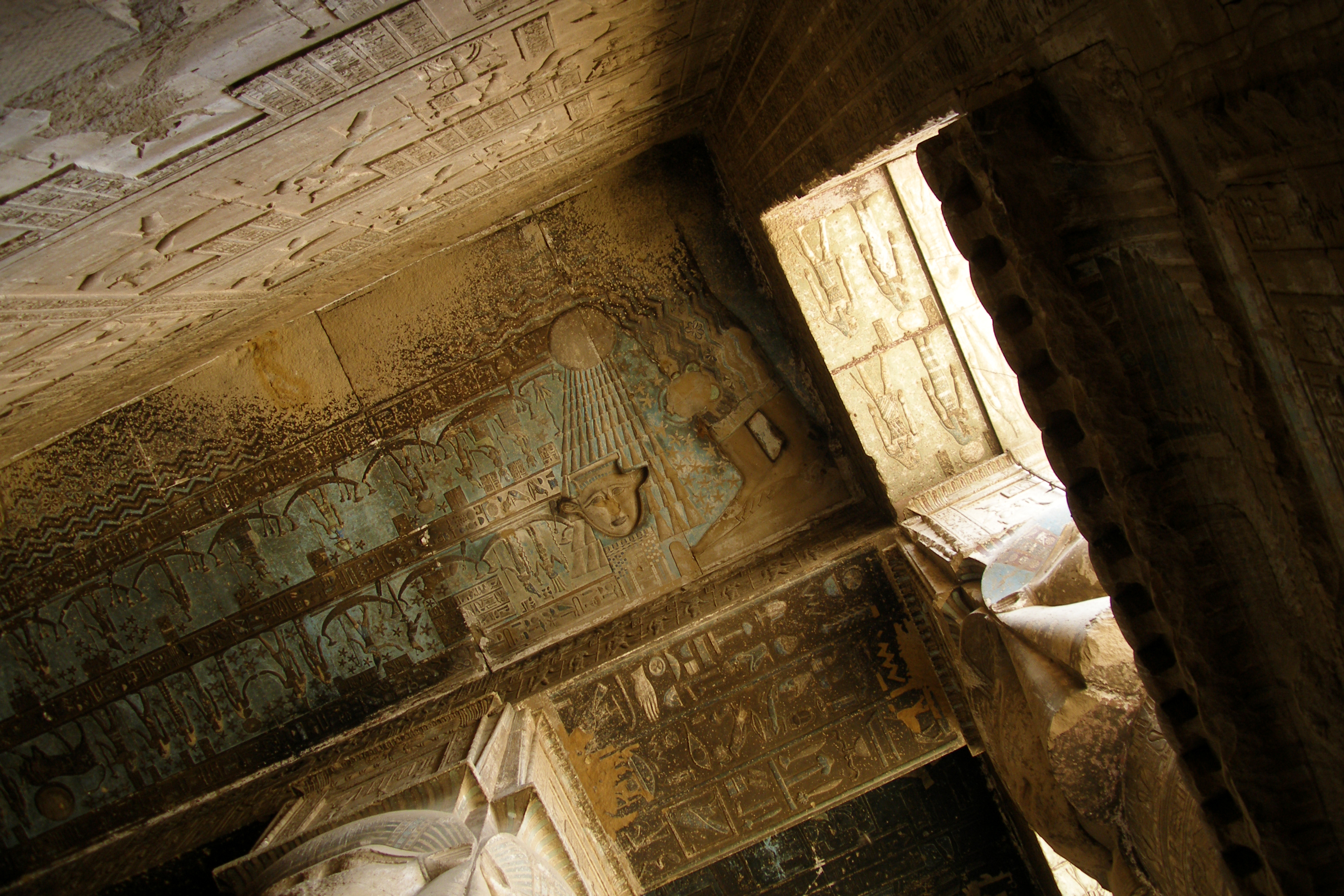

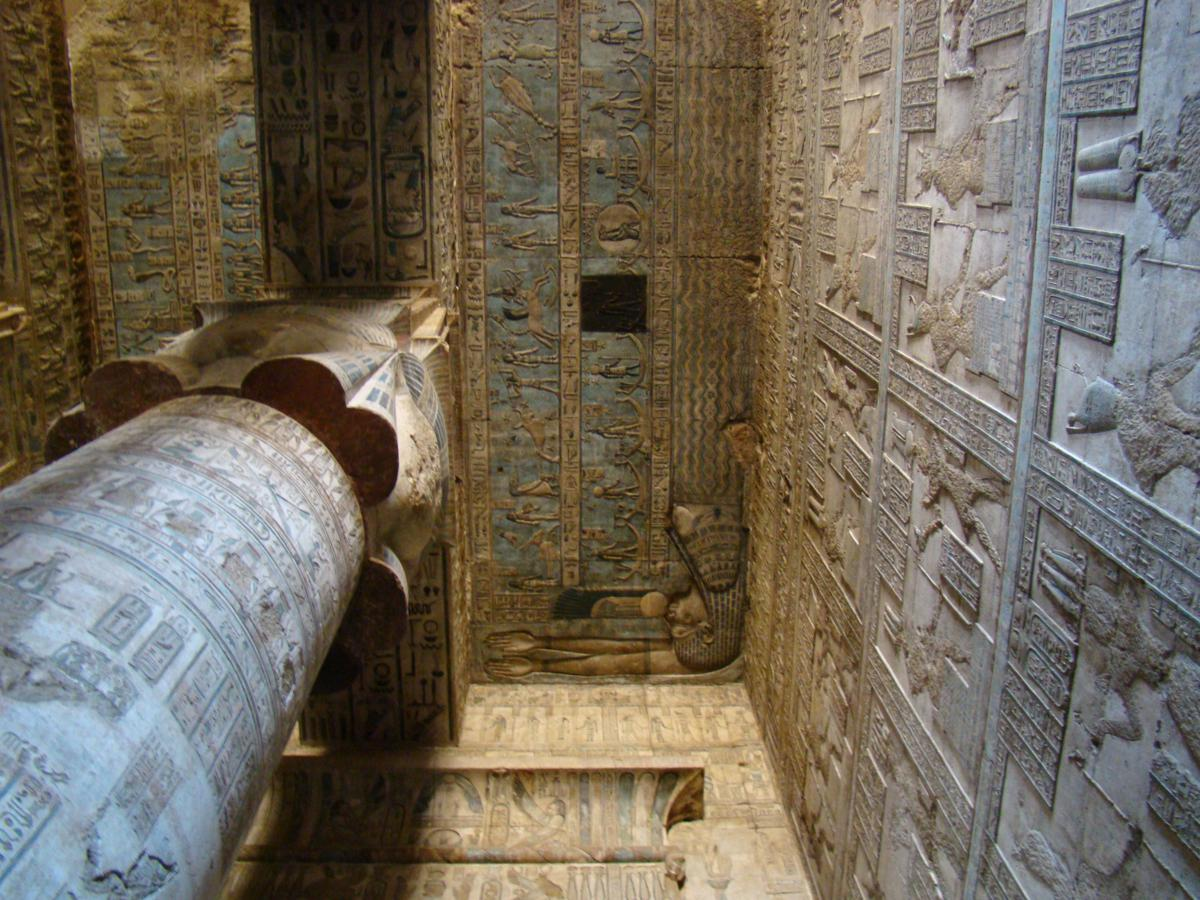

== Sources and external links ==
- GigaCatholic, listing the titular bishops
