= Lector priest =

Ancient Egyptian priest

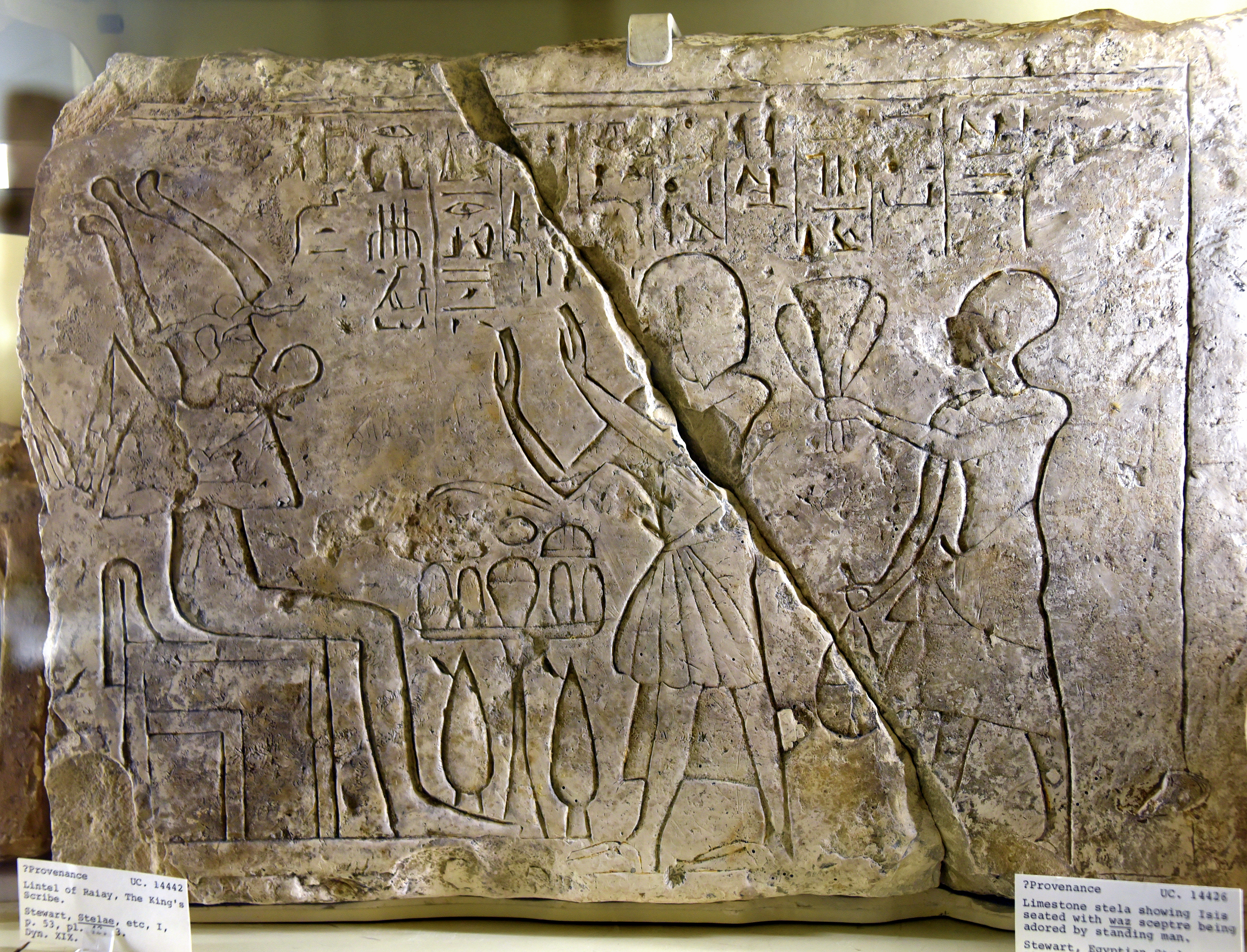
Lintel of Raiay, limestone stele of the King's scribe, chief lector priest, and the first god's servant of Sopdu Nakht. Both figures stand before the enthroned Osiris. 19th Dynasty. From Egypt. The Petrie Museum of Egyptian Archaeology, London

A lector priest was a priest in ancient Egypt who recited spells and hymns during temple rituals and official ceremonies. Such priests also sold their services to laymen, reciting texts during private apotropaic rituals or at funerals. As such, they were some of the most prominent practitioners of "magic" (heku) in ancient Egypt. In ancient Egyptian literature, lector priests are often portrayed as the keepers of secret knowledge and the performers of amazing magical feats.

The highest-ranking lector priest in a temple, the chief lector priest, managed the temple's archives of ritual texts.

The term lector priest is usually used to translate the Egyptian title, ẖrj-ḥꜣb (kheri-hab), which literally means "the carrier of the book of ritual". The term for a chief lector priest, ẖrj-ḥꜣb ḥrj-tp, was so closely associated with magic that, in Late Egyptian language, the shortened form ḥrj-tp became a general term for "magician".

Lector priests wore a sash across the chest that indicated their position.
