= Arunachal languages =

Languages of Arunachal Pradesh, India

Arunachal
- (geographic / cultural)
- Geographic distribution: Arunachal Pradesh
- Linguistic classification: Sino-Tibetan or an independent family: Arunachal
- Subdivisions: Greater Siangic; Hrusish; Kho-Bwa; Miju

Language codes
- Glottolog: None

Arunachal languages are various languages in Arunachal Pradesh, India traditionally classified as Sino-Tibetan languages, but that may be language isolates and independent language families according to some scholars. Blench (2011) proposed four language isolates (Hruso, Miji, Miju, and Puroik) and three independent families (Mishmic, Kamengic, and Siangic). However, this is disputed by Anderson (2014) and others, who consider them to be primary branches of Sino-Tibetan rather than as isolates or independent language phyla.

== Languages ==
Languages / Scheduled Tribes by percentage of speakers
Language	Number of Speakers	Percentage
Nyishi	285,843	20.66%
Adi	157,372	11.37%
Nepali	95,308	6.89%
Galo	79,661	5.76%
Tagin	63,436	4.58%
Monpa	60,501	4.37%
Wancho	56,886	4.11%
Assamese	53,719	3.88%
Bengali	50,434	3.64%
Hindi	47,740	3.45%
Chakma	47,073	3.40%
Apatani	43,777	3.16%
Mishmi	43,010	3.11%
Nocte	36,569	2.64%
Tangsa	36,422	2.63%
Bhojpuri	27,186	1.96%
Khamti	16,239	1.17%
Sadri	14,333	1.04%
Any Naga	12,338	0.89%
Missing	8,402	0.61%
Hruso	8,167	0.59%
Miji	8,127	0.59%
Odia	6,804	0.49%
Garo	6,492	0.47%
Singpho	5,616	0.41%
Bodo	5,392	0.39%
Deuri	5,365	0.39%
Puroik	4,554	0.33%
Memba	4,495	0.32%
Malayalam	4,012	0.29%
Punjabi	3,663	0.26%
Sherdukpen	3,463	0.25%
Yobin	2,994	0.22%
Maithili	2,933	0.21%
Hajong	2,711	0.20%
Marathi	2,262	0.16%
Tibetan	2,092	0.15%
Kachari	1,703	0.12%
Chungli	1,681	0.12%
Telugu	1,632	0.12%
Laju / Ollo Naga	1,541	0.11%
Santali	1,447	0.10%
Bugun	1,432	0.10%
Mizo	1,431	0.10%
Munda	1,424	0.10%
Mundari	1,378	0.10%
Tamil	1,245	0.09%
Urdu	1,238	0.09%
Karbi	1,068	0.08%
Tamang	1,057	0.08%
Meyor	989	0.07%
Khamba	777	0.06%
Nonong	26	0.00%

== Arunachal families ==
- Arunachal
  - Hrusish languages
    - Hruso 3,000 (2007)
    - Miji languages 28,000 (2007): Bangru, Eastern Miji, Western Miji
  - Kho-Bwa languages
    - Puroik: diverse dialects 20,000 (2011)
    - Bugun (900 cited 2001)
    - Western Kho-Bwa
      - Sherdukpen 5,000 (2019), Sartang 1,000 (2005)
      - Chug (Duhumbi) 600 (2017), Lish (Khispi) 1,500 (2017)
  - Siangic languages
    - Koro 1,500 (2011)
    - Milang 2,150 (2011)
  - Miju languages
    - Miju (Kman) 18,000 (2006)
    - Meyor (Zakhring) 1000 (2007)
  - Digaro languages
    - Idu (11,000 cited 2001 census)
    - Taraon (35,000 cited 2001 census)
  - Songlin language

== See also ==
- Mishmi languages
- Songlin language
