= Monpa people =

Major tribe of Arunachal Pradesh, India

Monpa
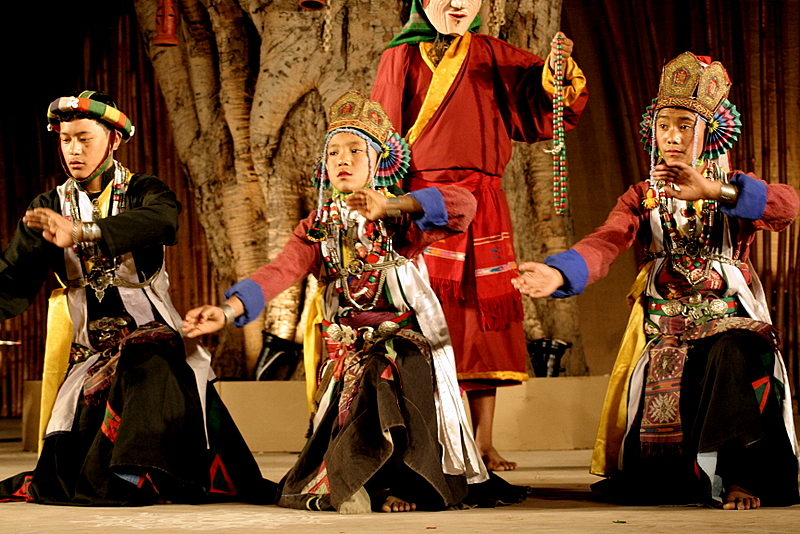
- Aji Lamu folk dance of the Monpas

Regions with significant populations
- India (Arunachal Pradesh): 60,545 (2011 census)
- China (Tibet): 11,143 (2020 census)

Languages
- East Bodish languages, Tshangla language, Kho-Bwa languages

Religion
- Tibetan Buddhism

Related ethnic groups
- Tibetan, Sherdukpen, Sharchops, Memba, Limbu

Monpa people

Tibetan name
- Tibetan: མོན་པ་
Transcriptions
- Tibetan Pinyin: mon pa

The Monpa (Note: Alternative spellings include Mönpa, Monba, and Memba.) (Tibetan: མོན་པ་, Wylie: mon pa, THL: mön pa, Chinese: 门巴族) are a major people of Arunachal Pradesh in northeastern India and one of the 56 officially recognized ethnic groups in China. Most Monpas live in the Indian state of Arunachal Pradesh, with a population of 50,000, centered in the districts of Tawang and West Kameng. Of Monpas who live in Arunachal Pradesh, about 20,000 live in Tawang district, where they constitute about 97% of the district's population, and almost all of the remainder can be found in the West Kameng district, where they form about 77% of the district's population. A small number of them may be found in bordering areas of East Kameng and Bhutan (2,500). Monpas also share very close affinity with the Sharchops of Bhutan. The Monpa are sub-divided into six sub-groups based on the variations in their language.

The Monpa are believed to be the only nomadic tribe in Northeast India – they are totally dependent on animals like sheep, cow, yak, goats and horses.

The term Monpa is a generic term in China, unlike in India where it refers to a specific tribal group: Monpa in China is a very generic term that includes people from trans-himalayan region and unlike the modern term used to refer to the tribe of Monpa of Tawang and West Kameng districts in India. Therefore, there must be careful study of the Monpa term and its use. The Monpa people in Tibet live in Lebugou, Cona county. There is a village called Le in Tibet, China where Monpa people are found. As of 2020 there were 11,143 Monpa people living in Le / Lebo / Lebugou / Lebugou township of Cona / Tsona City in the south of Tibet Autonomous Region, where they are known as Menba (simplified Chinese: 门巴族; traditional Chinese: 門巴族; pinyin: Ménbāzú). People of Medog (Pemako) in China are also called Monpa in China.

Monpa's language belongs to the Tibeto-Burman family, but it is significantly different from the Eastern Tibetan dialect. It is written with the Tibetan script.

== Name ==
Tibetan Buddhists texts present "Monyul" (literally, "low land") as the territory immediately to the south of Tibet below the Himalayan crest line. Its borders were imprecise, but roughly stretched from eastern Bhutan and western Sikkim to the Tawang area. "Monpa" were the people of Mon and they were distinguished from "Lopa" (also spelt "Lhopa"), who were the wild and intractable tribes of the Assam Himalayan region. In practice, Monpa were people amenable to the proselytising efforts of the Buddhist monks, whereas Lopa were those inimical to them.

In course of time, the various people of the historical "Monyul" came to be called by other names, such as Lepcha for the tribes of Sikkim and Drukpa for the people of Bhutan, but the people of Tawang continued to own the name "Monpa".

== Distribution ==
Most Monpas live in Arunachal Pradesh, India with a population of around 60,000, centred in the districts of Tawang and West Kameng. About 20,000 live in the Tawang district, where they constitute about 97% of the district's population, and almost all of the remainder can be found in West Kameng district, where they form about 77% of the district's population. A small number live in East Kameng district.

Around 9,000 Monpas live in Tibet, in Tsona County, Pêlung in Bayi District, and Mêdog County. These places fall completely outside of the Tibetan plateau and south of the Himalayan crest, and as a result have very low altitude, especially Mêdog County, which has a tropical climate unlike the rest of Tibet.

The Monpa are sub-divided into six sub-groups because of variations in their language. They are namely:

- Tawang Monpa
- Dirang Monpa
- Lish Monpa
- Bhut Monpa
- Kalaktang Monpa
- Panchen Monpa

== History ==
A state of Lhomon or Monyul is believed to have existed from 500 B.C to 600 A.D. centered in the present day Bhutan. In the 11th century, the Northern Monpas in Tawang came under the influence of the Tibetan Buddhism of the Nyingma and Kagyu denominations. At this time the Monpa adopted the Tibetan alphabet for their language mainly for religious purposes. Drukpa missionaries came to the region in the 13th century, and missionaries of the Gelug school came in the 17th century. The Gelug school is the sect to which most Monpas belong today. The Monpa were never regarded as Tibetan, even though they adopted the Tibetan language and script.

Around the 14th century, Monyul came under increasing Tibetan political and cultural influence, which was apparent in the years when Tsangyang Gyatso, an ethnic Monpa, became the 6th Dalai Lama. However, Monyul, also known as the Tawang Tract, remained a remote area and sparsely populated until the middle of the 20th century.

Monyul remained an autonomous entity, with local monks based in Tawang holding great political power within the kingdom, and direct rule over the area from Lhasa was established only in the 17th century. From this time until the early 20th century, Monyul was ruled by authorities in Lhasa. One of the first British-Indian travellers into Monyul, Nain Singh Rawat, who visited the area from 1875 to 1876, noted that the Monpa were a conservative people who shunned contact with the outside world and made efforts to monopolise trade with Tibet. In 1914, as part of the negotiations for the Simla Convention, Britain and Tibet negotiated their mutual border roughly along the crest of the Himalayas, which came to be called the McMahon Line. The line divided the land in which the Monpas inhabited, and became a source of contention in subsequent years because of ambiguities in the specific location of the McMahon Line.

== Languages ==
The languages spoken by the Monpa people are often referred to as the "Monpa languages". This is not a genealogical term, and several quite different languages are subsumed under it. "Monpa languages" include Kho-Bwa, East Bodish, and Tshangla languages. According to Blench (2014), five groups may be distinguished:

- The Sherdukpen, Lish, and Sartang languages show no obvious relationship to other languages of the region and they comprise a language island. These three languages are related to Bugun, and form a "Kho-Bwa" group together with it.
- The Tawang language is an East Bodish language, and is a variety of Dakpa.
- The languages of the Zemithang, Mago and Thingbu villages are additional East Bodish varieties that are not mutually intelligible with Tawang.
- The Tshangla language within Bodish comprises closely related dialects spoken in the villages of Nyukmadung and Lubrang and the Brokpa language spoken by nomads. Other languages include Dirang (also known as "Central Monpa"), Morshing and Kalaktang (also known as "Southern Monpa").

== Culture ==
The Monpa are known for wood carving, painting, carpet making and weaving. They manufacture paper from the pulp of the local sukso tree. A printing press can be found in the Tawang Monastery, where many religious texts are printed on local paper and wooden blocks, usually meant for literate Monpa Lamas. They are also known for their wooden bowls and bamboo weaving.

All animals except men and tigers are allowed to be hunted. According to tradition, only one individual is allowed to hunt the tiger on an auspicious day, upon the initiation period of the shamans, which can be likened to a trial of passage. After the tiger is killed, the jawbone, along with all its teeth, is used as a magic weapon. It is believed that its power will enable tigers to evoke the power of the guiding spirit of the ancestral tiger, who will accompany and protect the boy along his way.

=== Religion ===
The Monpa are generally adherents of the Gelug sect of Tibetan Buddhism, which they adopted in the 17th century as a result of the influence of the Bhutanese-educated Merag Lama. The testimony to this impact was the central role of the Tawang Monastery in the daily lives of the Monpa folk. In Zemithang the Monpa are adherents of the Nyingmapa strand of Mahayana/Tantrayana-tradition.

=== Festivals ===
Principal Monpa festivals include the Choskar harvest festival, Losar, and Torgya. During Losar, people generally offer prayers at the Tawang Monastery to pray for the coming of the Tibetan New Year. Pantomime dances are the principal feature of the Ajilamu festival.

Buddhist lamas read religious scriptures in the gompas for a few days during Choskar. Thereafter, the villagers walk around the cultivated fields with sutras on their back. The significance of this festival is to pray for better cultivation and the prosperity of the villagers, and protect the grains from insects and wild animals.

=== Society ===
The traditional society of the Monpa was administered by a council of six ministers locally known as Trukdri. The members of this council are known as Kenpo, literally the “Abbot”. The Lamas also hold honored positions, two monks known as Nyetsangs, and two other Dzongpen.

The man is the head of the family and he is the one who makes all decisions. In his absence, his wife takes over all responsibilities. When a child is born, they have no strict preference for a boy or a girl.

=== Lifestyle and dress ===
The traditional dress of the Monpa is based on the Tibetan chuba. Both men and women wear headwear made of yak hair, with long tassels. The women tend to wear a warm jacket and a sleeveless chemise that reaches down to the calves, tying the chemise round the waist with a long and narrow piece of cloth. Ornaments are made of silver, corals and turquoise. Sometimes a person wears a cap with a single peacock feather in a felt hats.

Due to the temperate climate of the eastern Himalayas, the Monpa, like most of the other ethnic groups in the region, construct their houses of stone and wood with plank floors, often accompanied with beautifully carved doors and window frames. The roof is made with bamboo matting, keeping their house warm during the winter season. Sitting platforms and hearths in the living rooms are also found in their houses.

The extreme climatic conditions have an influence on the Monpas food habits and sedentary lifestyle. They intake substantial amount of cheese, salt, and meat with alcohol to cope with extreme cold. The butter tea and locally made distilled liquor from maize, millet, barley, buckwheat or rice, etc. known as Chang, Baang-Chang, Sin-Chang. However, the gradual influx of tourists from other parts of India and with the influence of the western culture among educated younger generation there is a radical changes in the youth's diet habits. The commercially processed store-bought foods and fast foods like chips, burgers and samosa, and drinks like cappuccino coffees, and commercial alcohols, are widely prevalent today.

== Economy ==
The Monpa practice shifting and permanent types of cultivation. Cattle, yaks, cows, pigs, sheep and fowl are kept as domestic animals.

To prevent soil erosion from planting crops on hilly slopes, the Monpa have terraced many slopes. Cash crops such as paddy, maize, wheat, barley, millet, buckwheat, peppers, pumpkin and beans are planted.

== Notable Monpas ==
- Tsangyang Gyatso, 6th Dalai Lama
- Ngawang Tashi Bapu, popularly known as "Lama Tashi", Grammy Award nominee in the Traditional World Music category, 2006
- Prem Khandu Thungan, former Chief Minister of Arunachal Pradesh
- Dorjee Khandu, former Chief Minister of Arunachal Pradesh
- Pema Khandu, current Chief minister of Arunachal Pradesh
- Dorjee Wangdi Kharma, politician
- Tsewang Dhondup, politician
- Phurpa Tsering, politician
- Jambey Tashi, politician
- Tsering Tashi, politician
- Anshu Jamsenpa, mountaineer
- Karma Wangchu, Padma Shri ,politician and social worker
- Tsering Lhamu, politician
- Namgey Tsering, politician

== See also ==
- Tshangla
- Tibet
- South Tibet
- Limbu
- Sherdukpen

== Bibliography ==
- Mayilvaganan, M.; Khatoon, Nasima; Bej, Sourina (2020), Tawang, Monpas and Tibetan Buddhism in Transition: Life and Society along the India-China Borderland, Springer Singapore, ISBN 9789811543463
  - Jacob, Jabin T. (2020), "Arunachal Pradesh in India-China Relations: Trends in Chinese Behaviour and their Implications", Ibid, pp. 153–162, doi:10.1007/978-981-15-4346-3_11, ISBN 978-981-15-4345-6, S2CID 226450970
  - Nanda, Neeru (2020), "Tawang and the Mon in their Borderlands: A Historical Overview", Ibid, pp. 29–44, doi:10.1007/978-981-15-4346-3_3, ISBN 978-981-15-4345-6, S2CID 226473864
  - Mayilvaganan, M (2020), "Lifestyle and Health Issues among the Monpas of Tawang", Ibid, pp. 71–87, doi:10.1007/978-981-15-4346-3_6, ISBN 978-981-15-4345-6, S2CID 226720494
