= Languages of Asia =

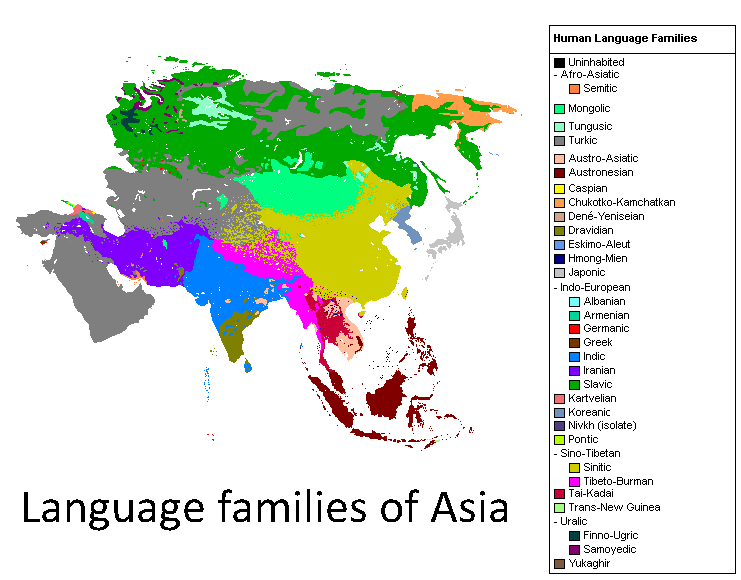
The Language families of Asia

Asia is home to hundreds of languages comprising several families and some unrelated isolates. The most spoken language families on the continent include Austroasiatic, Austronesian, Japonic, Dravidian, Indo-European, Afroasiatic, Turkic, Sino-Tibetan, Kra–Dai and Koreanic. Many languages of Asia, such as Chinese, Persian, Sanskrit, Arabic and Tamil have a long history as a written language.

== Language groups ==
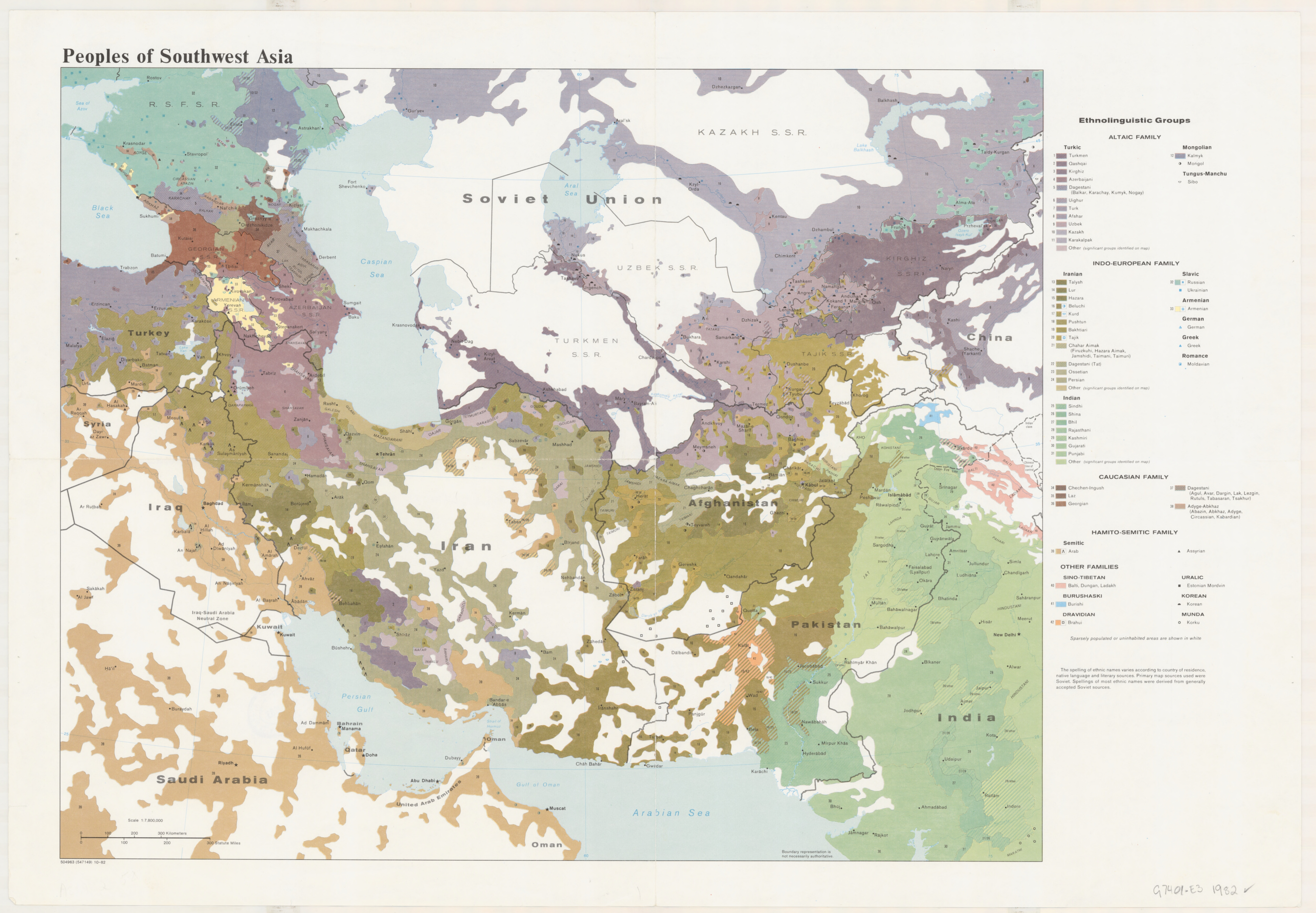
Ethnolinguistic distribution in Central/Southwest Asia of the Altaic, Caucasian, Afroasiatic (Hamito-Semitic) and Indo-European families.

150 languages of Asia, by subcontinents

The major families in terms of numbers are Indo-European, specifically Indo-Aryan languages and Dravidian languages in South Asia, Iranian languages in parts of West, Central, and South Asia, and Sino-Tibetan in East Asia. Several other families are regionally dominant.

=== Sino-Tibetan ===
Sino-Tibetan includes Chinese, Tibetan, Burmese, Karen, Boro and numerous languages of the Tibetan Plateau, Southern China, Myanmar, and North East India.

=== Indo-European ===
The Indo-European languages are primarily represented in Asia by the Indo-Iranian branch, with its two main subgroups: Indo-Aryan and Iranian.

==== Indo-Aryan ====
Indo-Aryan languages are mainly spoken in the Indian subcontinent, across different modern-day South Asian countries. Examples include languages such as Hindustani (Hindi-Urdu), Bengali, Maithilli, Bhojpuri, Punjabi, Marathi, Rajasthani, Gujarati, Sylheti, Noakhali etc.

==== Iranic ====
Iranic languages are mainly spoken in and around the Iranian Plateau, spread across the modern-day countries of Iran, Afghanistan, Tajikistan, Iraq, Syria, Turkey and Pakistan and neighboring regions. Examples include languages like Persian, Kurdish, Pashto and Balochi.

==== Others ====
Other branches of Indo-European spoken in Asia include the Slavic branch (due to Asia's proximity to Eastern Europe), which includes Russian in Siberia (since it falls under the Russian Federation); Greek around the Black Sea; and Armenian in Armenia; as well as extinct languages such as Hittite of Anatolia and Tocharian of (Chinese) Turkestan.

=== Altaic families ===
A number of smaller, but important and separately distinguished language families spread across central and northern Asia have long been linked in a hypothetical, controversial and unproven Altaic family. These are the Turkic, Mongolic, Tungusic (including Manchu), Koreanic, and Japonic languages. But since the mid-20th century a majority of scholars have come to regard it as a Sprachbund.

=== Austroasiatic ===
The Mon–Khmer languages (also known as Austroasiatic) are the language family in South and Southeast Asia. Languages given official status are Vietnamese, Khmer, Wa and Santali.

=== Kra–Dai ===
The Kra–Dai languages (also known as Tai-Kadai) are found in southern China, Northeast India and Southeast Asia. Languages given official status are Thai (Siamese) and Lao.

=== Austronesian ===
The Austronesian languages are widespread throughout Maritime Southeast Asia, including major languages such as Indonesian (Indonesia and Timor-Leste), Fijian (Fiji), Hiligaynon, Bikol, Ilocano, Cebuano, Tagalog (Philippines), and Malay (Brunei, Malaysia, and Singapore). Other significant Austronesian languages in Indonesia include Javanese, Sundanese, and Madurese. Meanwhile, Indonesian is the most widely spoken language in the Austronesian family.

=== Dravidian ===
The Dravidian languages of South India and parts of Sri Lanka include Tamil, Telugu, Kannada, Malayalam and Tulu, while smaller languages such as Gondi and Brahui are spoken in central India and Pakistan respectively.

=== Afro-Asiatic ===
The Afroasiatic languages (in older sources Hamito-Semitic) are represented in Asia by the Semitic branch. Semitic languages are spoken in West Asia, and include the various dialects of Arabic and Aramaic, Modern Hebrew, and Modern South Arabian languages in addition to extinct languages such as Akkadian and Ancient South Arabian.

=== Siberian families ===
Besides the Altaic families already mentioned (of which Tungusic is today a minor family of Siberia), there are a number of small language families and isolates spoken across northern Asia. These include the Uralic languages of western Siberia (better known for Hungarian and Finnish in Europe), the Yeniseian languages (linked to Turkic and to the Athabaskan languages of North America), Yukaghir, Nivkh of Sakhalin, Ainu of northern Japan, Chukotko-Kamchatkan in easternmost Siberia, and—just barely—Eskimo–Aleut. Some linguists have noted that the Koreanic languages share more similarities with the Paleosiberian languages than with the Altaic languages. The extinct Rouran language of Mongolia is unclassified, and does not show genetic relationships with any other known language family.

=== Caucasian families ===
Three small families are spoken in the Caucasus: Kartvelian languages, such as Georgian; Northeast Caucasian (Dagestanian languages), such as Chechen; and Northwest Caucasian, such as Circassian. The latter two may be related to each other. The extinct Hurro-Urartian languages may be related as well.

=== Small families of Asia ===
Although dominated by major languages and families, there are a number of minor families and isolates in South Asia and Southeast Asia. From west to east, these include:

- Hattic, an unclassified language in Anatolia.
- extinct languages of the Fertile Crescent such as Sumerian and Elamite.
- extinct languages of South Asia; mainly the unclassified Harappan language
- small language families and isolates of the Indian subcontinent: Burushaski, Kusunda, and Nihali. The Vedda language of Sri Lanka is likely an isolate that has mixed with Sinhala.
- the two Andamanese language families: Great Andamanese and Ongan; Sentinelese remains undocumented to date, and hence unclassified.
- unclassified languages in Southeast Asia: Kenaboi.
- the difficult to classify Arunachal languages: Digaro, Hrusish (including the Miji languages), Midzu, Puroik, Siangic, and Kho-Bwa.
- Hmong–Mien (Miao–Yao) scattered across southern China and Southeast Asia
- a few "Papuan" (Non-Austronesian) families of the central and eastern Malay Archipelago: such as the Timor-Alor-Pantar and North Halmahera languages, and the little known extinct Tambora language of Sumbawa. Numerous additional families are spoken in Indonesian New Guinea, which is generally considered to be part of Oceania.

=== Creoles and pidgins ===
The eponymous pidgin ("business") language developed with European trade in China. Of the many creoles to have developed, the most spoken today are Chavacano, a Spanish-based creole of the Philippines, and various Malay-based creoles such as Manado Malay influenced by Portuguese. A very well-known Portuguese-based creole is the Kristang, which is spoken in Malacca, a city-state in Malaysia.

=== Sign languages ===
A number of sign languages are spoken throughout Asia. These include the Japanese Sign Language family, Chinese Sign Language, Indo-Pakistani Sign Language, Filipino Sign Language as well as a number of small indigenous sign languages of countries such as Nepal, Thailand, and Vietnam. Many official sign languages are part of the French Sign Language family.

== Official languages ==
Asia and Europe are the only two continents where most countries use native languages as their official languages, though English is also widespread as an international language.

Language	Native name	Total Speakers	Language family	Official status in a country	Official status in a region
Altai	Алтай тил	57,000	Turkic		Russia: Altai Republic
Arabic	العَرَبِيَّة	313,000,000	Afro-Asiatic	Bahrain; Iraq; Jordan; Kuwait; Lebanon; Oman; Palestine; Qatar; Saudi Arabia; Syria; UAE; Yemen	Israel (special status)
Armenian	հայերեն	5,902,970	Indo-European	Armenia	
Assamese	অসমীয়া	15,000,000	Indo-European	India (Scheduled)	India: Assam
Azerbaijani	Azərbaycanca آذربایجان دیلی تۆرکجه	28,000,000	Turkic	Azerbaijan	Iran: South Azerbaijan; Russia: Dagestan (mostly in Derbent)
Balochi	بلۏچی Balòči	7,600,000	Indo-European		Pakistan: Balochistan; Iran: Sistan and Baluchestan (Recognised)
Balti	بلتی སྦལ་ཏི།	392,800	Sino-Tibetan		Pakistan: Gilgit Baltistan
Bengali	বাংলা	230,000,000	Indo-European	Bangladesh, India (Scheduled)	India: Barak Valley, Assam (Additional); Jharkhand (Recognised); Tripura; West Bengal
Bhojpuri	भोजपुरी	50,579,447	Indo-European	Nepal	Nepal: Province 2, Parsa, Bara; India: Jharkhand (Additional)
Bikol	Bikol; Bikol Naga	4,300,000	Austronesian		Philippines: Bicol Region
Bodo	बर'/बड़ Boro	1,984,569	Sino-Tibetan	India (Scheduled)	Nepal India: Bodoland, Assam; West Bengal
Burmese	မြန်မာဘာသာ	33,000,000	Sino-Tibetan	Myanmar	
Cantonese (Yue) Language	廣東話/广东话	110,000,000	Sino-Tibetan	Hong Kong Macau	
Buryat	Буряад хэлэн ᠪᠤᠷᠢᠶᠠᠳ ᠮᠣᠩᠭᠣᠯ ᠬᠡᠯᠡᠨ	440,000	Mongolic		Russia: Buryatia
Cebuano	Bisaya; Binisaya; Sinugbuanong_Binisaya; Sebwano/Sinebwano	27,500,000	Austronesian		Philippines: Central Visayas; Eastern Visayas; Northern Mindanao; Davao Region
Chhattisgarhi	छत्तीसगढ़ी	17,983,446	Indo-European		India: Chhattisgarh (Additional)
Chin	Kukish	3,000,000	Sino-Tibetan		Myanmar: Chin State
Chinese Mandarin	普通話/普通话 國語/国语 華語/华语	1,300,000,000	Sino-Tibetan	China; Singapore; Taiwan	Myanmar: Kokang; Wa State
Dhivehi	ދިވެހިބަސް	400,000	Indo-European	Maldives	
Dogri	डोगरी	2,600,000	Indo-European	India (Scheduled)	India: Jammu and Kashmir
Dzongkha	རྫོང་ཁ་	600,000	Sino-Tibetan	Bhutan	
English	English	203,000,000	Indo-European	Bangladesh (Recognized) India; Hong Kong; Malaysia (Recognized) Maldives (Recognized) Pakistan; Philippines; Singapore; Sri Lanka (Recognized) Timor-Leste (Working languages) UAE (Recognized)	
Filipino (Tagalog)	Wikang Filipino	106,000,000	Austronesian	Philippines	
French	Français	300	Indo-European	Lebanon (special status)	India: Puducherry (Additional)
Formosan		171,855	Austronesian		Republic of China: Taiwan
Georgian	ქართული	4,200,000	Kartvelian	Georgia	
Gujarati	ગુજરાતી	50,000,000	Indo-European	India (Scheduled)	India: Dadra and Nagar Haveli and Daman and Diu; Gujarat
Hakka	客家話/客家话; Hak-kâ-fa	2,370,000	Sino-Tibetan		Republic of China: Taiwan
Hebrew	עברית	7,000,000	Afro-Asiatic	Israel	
Hindi	हिन्दी	615,000,000	Indo-European	Fiji; India (Scheduled)	India: Andaman and Nicobar Islands; Bihar; Dadra and Nagar Haveli and Daman and Diu; Chhattisgarh; Delhi; Gujarat; Haryana; Himachal Pradesh; Jammu and Kashmir; Jharkhand; Ladakh; Madhya Pradesh; Rajasthan; Uttar Pradesh; Uttarakhand; West Bengal (Additional)
Hiligaynon	Hiligaynon; Ilonggo; Hiniligaynon/Inilonggo	9,100,000	Austronesian		Philippines: Western Visayas
Hokchiu	馬祖話; Mā-cū-huâ	12,000	Sino-Tibetan		Republic of China: Matsu, Fukien (de facto)
Hokkien	臺灣話; Tâi-oân-oē	18,570,000	Sino-Tibetan		Republic of China: Taiwan (de facto)
Ibanag	Ibanag	500,000	Austronesian		Philippines: Cagayan Valley
Ilocano	Pagsasao nga Ilokano	11,000,000	Austronesian		Philippines: Northern Luzon; Central Luzon
Indonesian	Bahasa Indonesia	270,000,000	Austronesian	Indonesia; Timor-Leste (Working languages)	
Japanese	日本語	120,000,000	Japonic	Japan (de facto)	Palau: Angaur Island
Javanese	Basa Jawa ꦧꦱꦗꦮ بَاسَا جَاوَا	80,000,000	Austronesian		Indonesia: Special Region of Yogyakarta; Central Java; East Java; Suriname, Sri Lanka, New Caledonia: Javanese is also spoken by traditional immigrant communities of Javanese descent
Kachin	Jinghpaw	940,000	Sino-Tibetan		Myanmar: Kachin State
Kannada	ಕನ್ನಡ	51,000,000	Dravidian	India (Scheduled)	India: Karnataka
Kapampangan	Kapampangan/Pampangan	2,800,000	Austronesian		Philippines: Central Luzon
Karen	ကညီကျိာ်း	6,000,000	Sino-Tibetan		Myanmar: Kayin State
Kashmiri	कॉशुर كٲشُر	7,000,000	Indo-European	India (Scheduled)	India: Jammu and Kashmir
Kayah	Karenni	190,000	Sino-Tibetan		Myanmar: Kayah State
Karakalpak	Qaraqalpaqsha	870,000	Turkic		Uzbekistan: Karakalpakstan
Kazakh	Qazaqşa; Қазақша قازاقشا	18,000,000	Turkic	Kazakhstan	China: Ili Kazakh Autonomous Prefecture; Russia: Altai Republic
Khakas	Хакас тілі Тадар тілі	43,000	Turkic		Russia: Khakassia
Khmer	ភាសាខ្មែរ	16,000,000	Austroasiatic	Cambodia	
Konkani	कोंकणी ಕೊಂಕಣಿ	2,300,000	Indo-European	India (Scheduled)	India: Goa; Maharashtra (Recognized); Karnataka (Recognized); Dadra and Nagar Haveli and Daman and Diu (Recognized)
Korean	조선어 한국어	80,000,000	Koreanic	North Korea; South Korea	China: Changbai Korean Autonomous County; Yanbian Korean Autonomous Prefecture
Kurdish	Kurdî کوردی	32,000,000	Indo-European		West Asia: Kurdistan
Kyrgyz	Кыргызча قىرعىزچا	7,300,000	Turkic	Kyrgyzstan	China: Kizilsu Kyrgyz Autonomous Prefecture
Lao	ພາສາລາວ	7,000,000	Kra-Dai	Laos	
Magahi	मगही/मगधी	12,706,825	Indo-European		India: Jharkhand (Additional)
Maguindanao	بس ماگینداناو Maguindanaon	1,500,000	Austronesian		Philippines: Bangsamoro; Soccsksargen; Zamboanga Peninsula
Malay	Bahasa Melayu بهاس ملايو	30,000,000	Austronesian	Brunei; Malaysia; Singapore	Indonesia: Malay language in Indonesia is considered a regional language (bahasa daerah), on part with regional languages spoken in the regions of Sumatra and Kalimantan; Thailand: Satun; Songkhla; Pattani; Yala; Narathiwat
Malayalam	മലയാളം	37,000,000	Dravidian	India (Scheduled)	India: Kerala; Lakshadweep; Mahé, Puducherry
Marathi	मराठी	99,000,000	Indo-European	India (Scheduled)	India: Dadra and Nagar Haveli and Daman and Diu; Goa; Maharashtra
Maithili	मैथिली	34,000,000	Indo-European	India (Scheduled)	Nepal: Madhesh Province; Province No. 1; India: Bihar; Jharkhand
Meitei	ꯃꯤꯇꯩꯂꯣꯟ মৈতৈ Manipuri	2,000,000	Sino-Tibetan		India: Manipur
Mizo	Mizo	1,000,000	Sino-Tibetan	India (Scheduled)	India: Mizoram
Mon	ဘာသာ မန်	851,000	Austroasiatic		Myanmar: Mon State
Mongolian	Монгол хэл ᠮᠣᠩᠭᠣᠯ ᠬᠡᠯᠡ	5,200,000	Mongolic	Mongolia	China: Inner Mongolia Autonomous Region
Nagpuri	नागपुरी/सादरी	5,108,691	Indo-European		India: Jharkhand (Additional)
Nepali	नेपाली	29,000,000	Indo-European	Nepal, India (Scheduled)	India: Darjeeling, West Bengal (Additional); Sikkim
Odia	ଓଡ଼ିଆ	35,000,000	Indo-European	India (Scheduled)	India: Odisha; Jharkhand (Recognised)
Okinawan	沖縄口 / うちなーぐち	1,143,000	Japonic		Japan: Okinawa Prefecture
Ossetian	Ирон	540,000 (50,000 in South Ossetia)	Indo-European		North Ossetia–Alania South Ossetia
Pangasinan	Pangasinan	1,400,000	Austronesian		Philippines: Ilocos Region; Central Luzon
Pashto	پښتو	40,000,000	Indo-European	Afghanistan	Pakistan: Balochistan (Recognised); Khyber Pakhtunkhwa (Recognised)
Persian	فارسی	130,000,000	Indo-European	Iran Afghanistan Tajikistan	
Portuguese	Português	2,000,000	Indo-European	Macau Timor-Leste	
Punjabi	ਪੰਜਾਬੀ پن٘جابی	113,000,000	Indo-European	India (Scheduled)	India: Delhi (Additional); Haryana (Additional); Punjab; West Bengal (Additional); Pakistan: Punjab
Rakhine	ရခိုင်ဘာသာ	1,000,000	Sino-Tibetan		Myanmar: Rakhine State
Rohingya	Ruáingga	1,800,000	Indo-European		U.N. refugee camps; Myanmar; Rakhine State
Russian	Русский	260,000,000	Indo-European	Kazakhstan (co-official); Kyrgyzstan (co-official)Russia; Tajikistan (interethnic)	
Sanskrit	संस्कृतम्	3,210,000	Indo-European	India (Scheduled)	India: Uttarakhand (Additional); Himachal Pradesh (Additional)
Santali	ᱥᱟᱱᱛᱟᱲᱤ	7,600,000	Austroasiatic	India (Scheduled)	India: West Bengal (Additional); Jharkhand; (Additional)
Shan	ၽႃႇသႃႇတႆ	3,295,000	Kra-Dai		Myanmar: Shan State
Sindhi	سنڌي	40,000,000	Indo-European	India (Scheduled)	Pakistan: Sindh
Sinhala	සිංහල	18,000,000	Indo-European	Sri Lanka	
Tamil	தமிழ்	88,000,000	Dravidian	India (Scheduled), Singapore, Sri Lanka	India: Puducherry; Tamil Nadu
Tausug	بَهَسَ سُوگ Bahasa Suluk	1,200,000	Austronesian		Philippines: Bangsamoro; Mimaropa; Zamboanga Peninsula; Malaysia: Sabah
Telugu	తెలుగు	86,000,000	Dravidian	India (Scheduled)	India: Andhra Pradesh; Telangana; Yanam, Puducherry
Tetum	Lia-Tetun	500,000	Austronesian	Timor-Leste	Indonesia: East Nusa Tenggara
Thai	ภาษาไทย	60,000,000	Kra–Dai	Thailand	
Tibetan	བོད་སྐད་	1,172,940	Sino-Tibetan		China: Tibet Autonomous Region
Tripuri	Tripuri	3,500,000	Sino-Tibetan		India: Tripura
Tulu	ತುಳು	1,722,768	Dravidian		India: Karnataka (Recognised); Kerala (Recognised)
Turkish	Türkçe	88,000,000	Turkic	Turkey; Cyprus	Iraq: Turkmeneli
Turkmen	Türkmençe	7,000,000	Turkic	Turkmenistan	
Tuvan	Тыва дыл	240,000	Turkic		Russia: Tuva
Urdu	اُردُو	255,000,000	Indo-European	Pakistan, India (Scheduled)	India: Bihar (Recognised in 15 districts); Jammu and Kashmir; Jharkhand (Recognised); National Capital Territory of Delhi (Additional); Telangana (Additional); Andhra Pradesh (Additional); Uttar Pradesh (Additional); West Bengal (Additional)
Uyghur	ئۇيغۇرچە	10,416,910	Turkic		China: Xinjiang Uygur Autonomous Region
Uzbek	Oʻzbekcha; Ўзбекча	45,000,000	Turkic	Uzbekistan	
Vietnamese	㗂越 Tiếng Việt	86,500,000	Austroasiatic	Vietnam (de facto)	
Waray	Winaray/Waray	4,000,000	Austronesian		Philippines: Eastern Visayas
Yakut	Саха тыла	450,000	Turkic		Russia: Yakutia
Zhuang	Vahcuengh	16,000,000	Kra-Dai		China: Guangxi Zhuang Autonomous Region; Wenshan Prefecture, Yunnan

== See also ==
- Asian studies
- Asianic languages
- Classification schemes for Southeast Asian languages
- East Asian languages
- Languages of South Asia
- List of extinct languages of Asia

By ISO 639-3 code
Enter an ISO code to find the corresponding language article.
