= Chug =

Chug may refer to:

- A crossbreed between a chihuahua dog and a pug
- Chug language, a language of India
- CHUG (AM), a community radio station in Stephenville, Newfoundland and Labrador, Canada
- An onomatopoeia for the sound of a heavy, palm muted guitar.
