= Sherdukpen people =

Ethnic group of Arunachal Pradesh, Northeast India

Sherdukpen
Ngnok
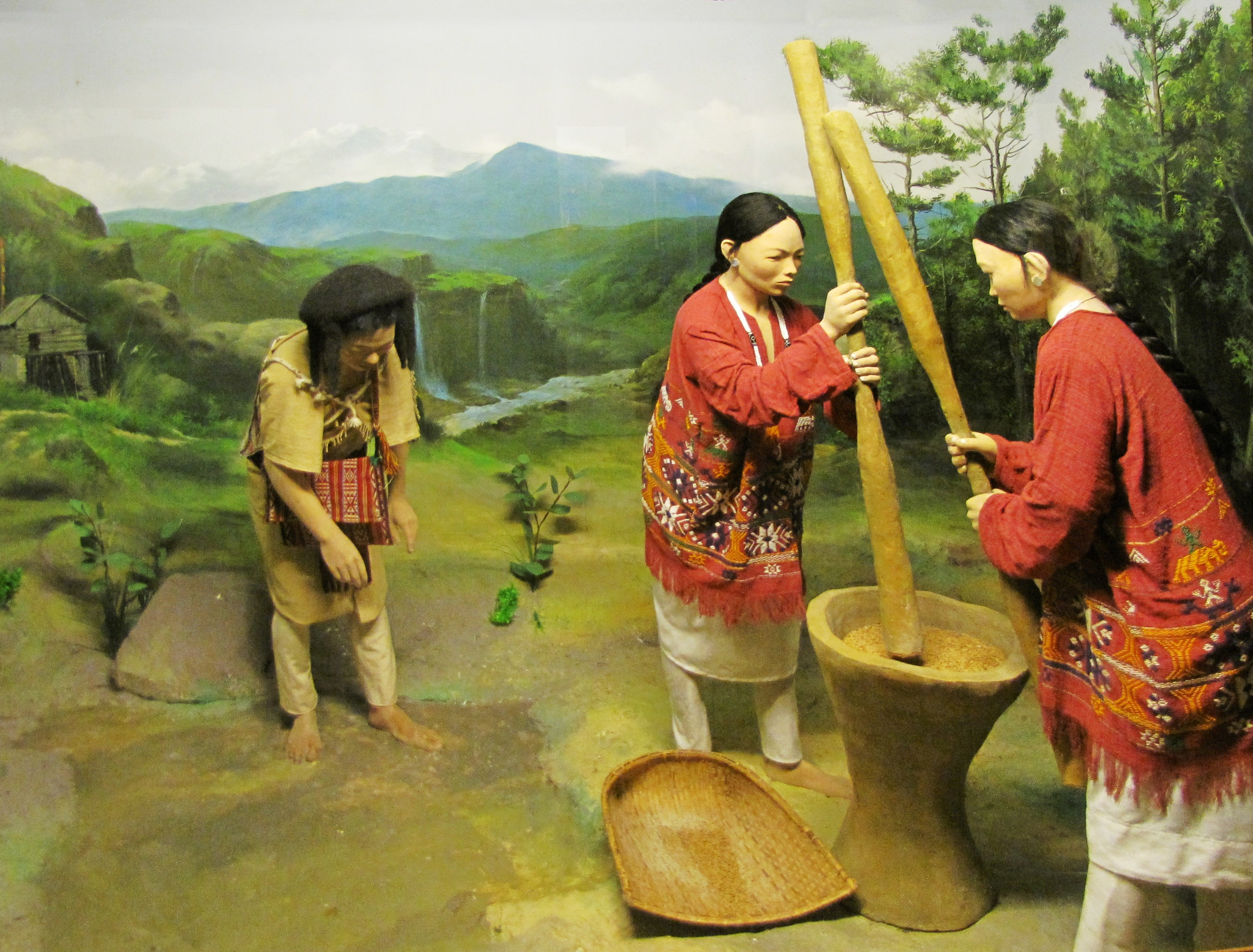
- Diorama and wax figures of the Sherdukpen people at the Jawaharlal Nehru Museum, Itanagar, Arunachal Pradesh

Total population
- 9,663 (2011 census)

Regions with significant populations
- India; Arunachal Pradesh

Languages
- Sherdukpen, Tshangla, Assamese

Religion
- Buddhism, Animism

Related ethnic groups
- Monpa, Aka, Khowa

The Sherdukpen are an ethnic group of Arunachal Pradesh state of India. Their population of 9,663 is centered in West Kameng district in the villages of Rupa, Jigaon, Thongri, Shergaon, to the south of Bomdila. All of these are at elevations between 5000 and 6000 feet above sea level. Of late, some of them have settled in Kameng bari areas, a new settlement area under Bhalukpong circle.

== Society ==
Sherdukpen society is divided into two classes: The Thong and Chao, The Thong (higher caste) consist of Thongchi, Thongdok, Wangja, Khrimey, Mosobi and Thongon, the former of which–the higher caste–are divided into eight clans. Marriages between inter-castes are considered taboo within the tribal society and are strongly discouraged. Local legend mentioned that the upper caste are the descendants of a Tibetan king (a grandson of Songtsän Gampo) and Ahom princess, of which they bore two sons. The Chao are the descendants of the king's porters and servants. The Sherdukpens migrate to Doimara (a lowland hamlet close to the Assamese border) and stayed between December and March on an annual basis during the winter months, a tradition with which the tribe maintain the memory of their Assamese ancestry. In Doimara, the Sherdukpens mingled with the nearby Assamese natives and traded for rice.

The Sherdukpen generally practice monogamy and trace their descent patrilineally. Their houses are built on strong stone foundations with their wall and floor made from thick wooden planks.

== Language ==
The Sherdukpen speak their own language, Sherdukpen, which isn't directly related with the neighboring Bugun and Monpa language. It is possibly of Tibeto-Burman derivation.

== Dress ==
The Sherdukpen men wear a sleeveless cloth, which is made out of silk, with the two ends of the cloth which pins onto the shoulders that reach down to the knees. Made from yak's hair with tassels jutting down over the face, the gurdam skull-cap is mainly worn by the men. It is decorated with a white cockade and colourful band around its brim. The warriors are often seen carrying their Tibetan sword, with the support of a waistband. A bogre, a cloth woven from natural fibres, is tied around the shoulders to form a fold at the back.

The women wear a collarless and sleeveless cloth to cover them from the shoulders to the knees. A full-sleeved embroidered jacket and waist cloth, known as mushaiks, is worn over the cloak. The ladies tie their hair tied into a bun at the back, although most grown-up girls do not tie their tresses into a knot. Weaving is considered a feminine art, and most women are able to weave different kinds of clothing in a highly artistic manner.

== Religion ==
The Sherdukpen adopted the Gelugpa sect of Tibetan Buddhism as with their northern neighbours, the Monpa who were also subjected to the evangelical influence of Mera Lama. However, contrary to the Monpas, Sherdukpens are more inclined to their pre-Buddhist Animistic traditions, which is shown by the relative absence of any Buddhist Lamas within their tribe.

Lamas from the Monpa and refugee Tibetan communities were invited to conduct Buddhist communal rituals whenever necessary. The profound Animist influence is attributed to the prevalence of their traditional Shamans with which they also employ for certain religious activities, known as "Jiji" in the local tongue. Rituals pertaining to indigenous spirits, human sacrifice and blood are prevalent within Sherdukpen mythology and legends, which is characteristically absent in Tibetan Buddhism.
