= Khowa =

Khowa may refer to:

- Khowa people, or Bugun, an ethnic group of north-eastern India
- Khowa language, the Sino-Tibetan language spoken by them
- Elliot, South Africa, a town which was renamed Khowa

== See also ==
- Khowar language, an Indo-Aryan language of northern Pakistan
- Khoa
- Khoua District, in Laos
