= Puroik language =

Kho-Bwa language

Puroik
- Sulung
- pɯh˧˩ ɣut˥
- Pronunciation: [pɯh˧˩ ɣut˥]
- Native to: India, China
- Region: Arunachal Pradesh
- Ethnicity: Puroik people
- Native speakers: 20,000 (2011)
- Language family: Sino-Tibetan?: Kho-Bwa?; Puroik
- Dialects: Kurung-Kumey; Chayangtajo; Lasumpatte; Sario-Saria; Rawa; Kojo-Rojo; Bulu

Language codes
- ISO 639-3: suv
- Glottolog: puro1234
- ELP: Puroik

The Puroik language (previously called Sulung, a derogatory term, by other tribes) is a set of language varieties spoken by the Puroik people of Arunachal Pradesh in India and of Lhünzê County, Tibet, in China.

Besides their own language, the Puroik also use Nishi, Hindi, and Assamese. Literacy is very low, at about 2%. Those who are literate use either the Bengali-Assamese script, Devanagari or the Latin alphabet to write Puroik.

== Geographical distribution ==
Remsangpuia (2008:17) listed a limited number of Puroik villages. Currently, Puroik are seen inhabiting the following districts and circles of Arunachal Pradesh. They also live in Nyishi, Aka, and Miji areas.

- East Kameng District: Chayangtajo, Pipu, Pakke Kessang, Lada, Bameng, Seijosa, Seppa, Sawa, Khenewa, and Pipu-Dipu circles (about 70 villages)
- Pakke-Kessang District: Pakke-Kessang and Seijosa circles
- Kurung Kumey District: Koloriang, Sarli, Damin, Parsi Parlo, Nyapin, Phassang, and Paniasang circles
- Kra Daadi District: Palin, Tali, and Pipsorang circles
- Papum Pare District
- West Kameng District
- Upper Subansiri District: Taksing circle

According to the Ethnologue, Puroik is spoken in 53 villages along the Par River in Arunachal Pradesh.

The Puroik are located from the Upper Subansiri River drainage basin (西巴霞区) to the Tawang River drainage basin (Li 2005). Names include pɯh˧˩ ɣut˥ (autonym) and su˥ loŋ˧ (Bangni exonym). There are about 3,000 Puroik as of 2002, who are classified as ethnic Lhoba by the Chinese government.

== Dialects ==
Lieberherr (2015) consider Puroik to be a dialect chain where geographically distant dialects are mutually unintelligible, whereas dialects located close to each other are mutually intelligible. The internal diversity of Puroik is about equal to that of the Western Kho-Bwa branch. Lieberherr (2015) and Lieberherr & Bodt (2017) list the following dialects of Puroik, provided here in geographical order from east to west.

- Kurung-Kumey dialect: spoken in Kurung Kumey district, which is located to the east of Chayangtajo. May be most similar to the Puroik dialect described in Li Daqin (2004) and other Chinese sources.
- Chayangtajo dialect: spoken in Sanchu and neighboring villages of Chayangtajo circle, East Kameng district, Arunachal Pradesh, India by a few hundred speakers.
- Lasumpatte dialect: spoken in Lasumpatte village in Seijosa near the Assam border. Most inhabitants have recently migrated from the Chayangtajo area.
- Sario-Saria dialect: spoken in three villages by a few hundred speakers.
- Rawa dialect: spoken in several villages in and around Rawa by a few hundred speakers (located between Chayangtajo and Kojo-Rojo). Also includes Poube village.
- Kojo-Rojo dialect: spoken in the villages of Kojo and Rojo, and possibly also in Jarkam village (mutually intelligible with the Puroik dialect spoken in other villages in Lada circle).
- Bulu dialect: spoken only in Bulu village by 7–20 speakers.

== Classification ==
Lieberherr & Bodt (2017) classify Puroik as Kho-Bwa, and has traditionally been considered to be a Sino-Tibetan language. There is some mutual intelligibility with Bugun, and Burling (2003) grouped it with Bugun and Sherdukpen, and possibly with Lish and Sartang.

James A. Matisoff (2009) considers Puroik to be a Tibeto-Burman language that has undergone sound changes such as:

- Proto-Tibeto-Burman nasals > voiced stops
- Proto-Tibeto-Burman *-a > -i

Lieberherr (2015) also considers Puroik to be a Tibeto-Burman language, although he notes that it has likely borrowed from non-Tibetan-Burman languages. However, Roger Blench (2011) considers Puroik to be a language isolate.

== Phonology ==
=== Consonants ===
Consonant phonemes
		Labial	Dental/Alveolar		Palatal	Velar	Glottal
		Labial	plain	lateral	Palatal	Velar	Glottal
Nasal		m	n			ŋ	
Plosive/ Affricate	voiceless	p	t̪		tʃ	k	ʔ
Plosive/ Affricate	aspirated	pʰ					
Plosive/ Affricate	voiced	b	d̪		dʒ	ɡ	
Fricative	voiceless	f	s	ɬ			h
Fricative	voiced	v	z				
Rhotic			r				
Approximant		w	ɹ	l	j		

=== Vowels ===
Monophthong phonemes
	Front	Central	Back	
	Front	Central	unrounded	rounded
Close	i		ɯ	u
Mid	e	ə		ɔ
Open		a		ɔ

== Grammar ==
The Puroik grammar notes here have been adapted primarily from Tayeng (1990).

=== Number ===
Number is not considered a grammatical feature in Puroik. Plurality is expressed, when required to be stated clearly by huangda, meaning all, many, etc.

=== Gender ===
There is no grammatical gender in Puroik. However the two sexes are distinguished when necessary. To indicate other relatives and persons the suffix -aphu is added for the male and -amua for the female. Demonstrative, and Interrogative.

=== Case ===
Seven cases may be distinguished: Subject (Nominative), Object (Accusative), Instrumental, Dative (Purposive), Ablative, Possessive (Genitive), and Locative.

=== Pronoun ===
The Personal Pronoun distinguished three persons (the first person, second person, and third person) and two numbers (singular and plural). The same form is used for both genders.

=== Adjective ===
There are four types of adjectives: adjective of quality, adjective of quantity, demonstrative adjective, interrogative adjective.

=== Verb ===
Puroik verbs do not indicate number and person. The three principal tenses (present, past, and future), including the indefinite and the continuous are indicated by means of particles used as suffixes. There are four moods: Imperative, potential, conditional, and subjunctive. Imperative uses the suffix -bo, -da, and -ge for commands. Potential uses the suffix -pa to express the ability to perform. Conditional uses -re/-hangra to express obligation.

=== Adverb ===
Adverbs may be distinguished into four classes: Time, place, manner, and interrogative.

== Vocabulary ==
The following list of 181 words in three Puroik dialects, in addition to Proto-Puroik (the reconstructed proto-language of the Puroik lects), is from Lieberherr (2015: 280–286). Lieberherr (2015) reconstructs Proto-Puroik, drawing data from the Chayangtajo dialect and the newly described Kojo-Rojo and Bulu dialects. Forms from the Rawa and Saria dialects have also been included.

Gloss	Puroik (Bulu)	Puroik (Kojo-Rojo)	Puroik (Chayangtajo)	Proto-Puroik
1SG (I)	guu	goo	goo	*goo
2SG (you, sg.)	naa	(naŋ)	naa	*naŋ (?)
3SG (he, she)	vɛɛ	wai	wɛɛ	*vai
1PL (we)	(g-rii)	gə-nii	g-rei	*gə-ńei (?)
2PL (you, pl.)	(na-rii)	na-nii	na-rei	*na-ńei (?)
1DU (we two)	gə-se-niʔ/(gə-he-niʔ)	gə-se-nii	gə-sɛ-nii	*gə-se-niʔ (?)
imperfective suffix	-na	-na	-na	*-na
pretemporal	-ryila	-ruila	-ruila	*-ruila
one	[tyi]	[kjuu]	[hui]	*?
two	niʔ	(nii)	nii	*niʔ
three	ɨm	ɻɨm	ɯk	*ɨm̄ (?)
four	vii	wɻei	wɻei	*vɻei
five	wuu	woo	wuu	*woo (?)
six	rəʔ	rəʔ	rək	*rək
seven	mə-ljɛɛ	jei	ljɛɛ	*mə-ljai
eight	mə-ljao	jau	(laa)	*mə-ljaa
nine	duNgii	duŋgɻee	doŋgɻɛɛ	*doŋ-gjee (?)
ten	suɛN	ʃuan	suaik	*suan̄ (?)
above	a-tʃaN	a-tʃjaŋ	a-tʃuaŋ	*a-tʃuaŋ (?)
alive	a-seN	a-sən	a-sik	*a-sen̄
ant	(dʒamdʒuʔ)	gamgɻuʔ	gɻɛŋgɻo	*gjamgjoʔ
awaken (intr.)	ʒao	ʒau	jaa	*jaa
bamboo (edible)	ma-bjao	mə-bɻau	mə-bɻaa	*ma-bjaa
before	bui	bui	bue	*bui
belly (exterior)	a-ɬyi-buN	hui-buŋ	a-ɬue-buk	*a-ɬui-buŋ̄
belly (interior)	a-ɬyi	a-hui	a-ɬue	*a-ɬui
bird	pə-duu	pə-doo	pə-dou	*pə-dou (?)
bite	tɔɔ	tua	tua	*tua
bitter	a-tʃaʔ	a-tʃuaʔ	a-tʃjaa	*a-tʃuaʔ (?)
black	a-hjɛN	a-hjeĩ	a-hjɛ̃	*a-hjaĩ
blow	fuu	fuu	(fuk)	*fuu
blue	a-pii	a-pii	a-pii	*a-pii
blood	a-hui	a-fui	a-hue	*a-hui (?)
bone	a-zɛN	a-zan	a-zaik	*a-zan̄
bow	lɨɨ	lei	lei	*lei (?)
branch	a-kjɛɛ	hɻɨn-kɻei	hɻeŋ-kɻɛɛ	*kjai
breast (female)	a-njɛɛ	a-njei	a-njɛɛ	*a-njai
breathe	ʒuu	ʒuu	joo	*joo
bridge (not hanging)	ka-tyiN	ka-tun	ka-tuik	*ka-tun̄
brother (younger)	a-nɔɔ	a-nua	anua	*a-nua
burn (transitive)	rii	rii	rii	*rii
can	muɛN	muan	muaiŋ	*muan
cane	rii	rei	rei	*rei
cave	wuʔ	uʔ	oo	*woʔ
chicken	[tʃaʔ]	[takjuu]	[səkuu]	
child	a-dəə	a-doo	a-dou	*a-dou (?)
cloth	ɛʔ	aiʔ	aik (Rawa at)	*at
crazy	a-bjao	a-bɻaa	bɻaa-bo	*abjaa
cry	(tʃɛʔ)	tʃap	tʃjap	*tʃjap (?)
cut (hit with dao)	pɛN	pan	paik	*pan̄
cut (without leaving the blade)	iʔ	iʔ	ii	*iʔ
day	a-nii	a-nii	a-rii	*a-ńii
die	ii	ii	ii	*ii
dig	tʃuʔ	tʃuʔ	tʃoo	*tʃoʔ
do/make	[tsaʔ]	[ʒou]	[kaik]	
door	haN-wuiN	ha-wun	tʃuk-wuik	*HOUSE-wun̄
down	buu	buu	buu	*buu
dream	baN	baŋ	bak	*baŋ̄
drink	in	in	[riŋ]	*in
dry	a-wuɛN	a-wuan	a-wuaik	*awuan̄
ear	a-kuiN	a-kun	a-kuik	*a-kun̄
eat	tʃii	tʃii	tʃii	*tʃii
extinguish (intr.)	[gɛʔ]	biʔ	bik (Rawa bit)	*bit
existential copula	[wɛɛ]	[wai]	wɛɛ	
eye	a-kəm	a-kəm	a-kək	*a-kəm̄
fall (from a height)	ɬuʔ	huʔ (ɬuʔ)	ɬjok-lo	*ɬuk (?)
fart	waiʔ	wai	wɛɛ	*waiʔ
far	a-tʃoi	a-tʃai	a-tʃjɛɛ	*a-tʃuai (?)
fat/grease	a-ʒɔɔ	a-zjaa	a-zua	*azua (?)
female/mother	a-mɔɔ	a-mua	a-mua	*a-mua
fingernail	(ageʔ gə-sɨn)	gei-sin	geisik	*ge-sin̄
fire	bɛɛ	bai	bɛɛ	*bai
firewood	ʃiN	hɻɨn	hɻeŋ	*sjen (?)
fish	[tʃɨi]	[tʃui]	[kahuaŋ]	
flow	nyɛ	nuai	ruɛ	*ńuai
flower	a-buɛN	hɻɨn-buan	mə-buaik	*buan̄
food	mə-luɛN	mə-luan	mə-luaik	*mə-luan̄
frog	rəʔ	rəʔ	rəə	*rəʔ
fruit	ʃiN-wɛɛ	hɻɨn-wai	roŋ-wɛɛ	*wai
full	ljɛɛ	jei	ljɛɛ	*ljai
full/satiated	mɨŋ	moŋ	moŋ	*moŋ
garlic (Allium hookeri)	daN	daŋ	dak	*daŋ̄
ghost	mə-ɬao	mə-hau (mə-ɬau)	mə-ɬaa	*mə-ɬaa
give	taN	taŋ	taŋ	*taŋ
green	a-rjɛɛ	a-rjei	a-rjɛɛ	*a-rjai
guts	a-ɬyi-rin	a-hui-rin	a-ɬue-riŋ	*a-ɬui-rin
hair (on body)	a-mɨn	a-mən	a-muiŋ	*a-mun
hair (on head)	kə-zaN	(kə-zjaŋ)	kə-zak	*kə-zaŋ̄
hand/arm	a-geʔ	a-geiʔ	a-geik (Rawa gət)	*a-gət
head	a-kuN	a-kuŋ-bəə	a-kok-bəə	*akoŋ̄
heart	a-luN-bəə	a-luŋ-bəə	a-lok-bəə	*a-loŋ̄-bəə
hold in mouth	mom	?	mom	*mom
husband	a-wui	a-wui	a-wue	*a-wui
ill/sick	naN	naŋ	raŋ	*ńaŋ
itch	ɔɔ	a-wua	a-wua	*a-wua
kill	[wɛʔ]	aiʔ	aik (Rawa at)	*at
knife (machete)	tʃii	tʃee	tʃee	*tʃee (?)
know	dɛN	dan	daik	*dan̄
leaf	a-ləp	(hɻɨn-jəp)	a-lək	*ljəp
leech	[pa-]wɛʔ	[pə-]waiʔ	ka-waik (Rawa pəwat)	*ka-wat
left side	pa-fii	pua-fii	pua-fee	*puafee (?)
leg	a-lɛɛ	a-lai	a-lɛɛ	*lai
lick	ljaʔ	jaa	vjaa	*?
light	a-tɔɔ	a-tua	a-tua	*a-tua
listen	nɨŋ	nuŋ	roŋ	*ńoŋ
liver	a-pjiN	a-pjin	a-pjik	*a-pjin̄
long	a-pjaN	a-pɻaŋ	a-pɻaŋ	*a-pjaŋ
louse (head)	[ʃiʔ]	[hɻɛ̃]	[pɻɛɛ]	*?
male/father	a-pɔɔ	a-pua	a-pua	*apua
man	a-fuu	a-foo	a-fuu	*a-fuu (?)
marrow	(a-ɬyiN)	a-hin	a-ɬiŋ	*a-ɬin
meat	[ʃii]	[mai]	[mərjek]	*?
monkey (macaque)	[məraŋ]	[səduŋ]	[məzii]	
mortar	sətsəm	tʃuŋtʃəm	tʃjuŋtʃək	*tʃuŋ-tʃəm̄
mouth	a-səm	a-səm	a-sək	*a-səm̄
mushroom	mɨŋ	məŋ	məŋ	*məŋ
mute/stupid	bloʔ	bloʔ	blok	*blok
name	a-bjɛN	a-bɻɛn	a-bɻɛŋ	*a-bjɛn
near	a-nyi	a-nui	a-nui	*a-nui (?)
neck	kə-tuN-rin	tuŋ-rin	kə-tuŋ	*kə-tuŋ
negation	ba-	ba-	ba-	*ba-
new (of things)	a-fɛN	a-fan	a-faik	*a-fan̄
night/dark	a-tʃeN	a-tʃen	a-tʃik	*a-tʃen̄ (?)
nose	a-puŋ	a-puŋ	a-pok	*a-poŋ̄
old (of things)	a-tsɛN	a-tʃjen	a-tʃaik	*a-tʃjan̄
path	lim	lim	lik (Saria dialect)	*lim̄
penis	a-lɔʔ	a-luaʔ	a-lua	*a-luaʔ
person	[prin]	bii	bii	*bii
pig	[waʔ]	[dui]	[mədou]	*?
pillow	ka-kəm	koŋ-kəm	ko-kəm	*koŋ̄ -kəm (?)
Puroik	(prin-dəə)	purun	puruik	*purun̄
pull	ryi	rui	rue	*rui
quiver	zəp	zəp	zək	*zəp
ripe	a-min	a-min	a-miŋ	*a-min
rot	ʃam	hɻam	hjap	*sjam̄ (?)
run	rin	ren	rik	*rin̄
sago flour	bii	bee-mo	bee	*bee (?)
sago club (tool)	waN	waŋ	wak	*waŋ̄
sago pick (front part)	kjuʔ	kɻuʔ	kɻok	*kjok
scratch	bjuʔ	bɻuʔ	bɻoo	*bjoʔ
sew	pin	pin	piŋ	*pin
shade	a-ɬim	a-him	a-ɬəp	*a-ɬim̄ (?)
shelf (over fireplace)	rap	rap	rak	*rap
shoulder	pa-tɨŋ	pua-tuŋ	pua-tok	*pua-toŋ̄
shy	bii-wɛN	bii-wan	bii-waik	*biiwan̄
sit	[rɨɨ]	[dʒao]	[tuŋ]	
skin	a-kuʔ	a-kɨʔ	a-kəə	*a-kuʔ (?)
sky	ha-mɨŋ	məŋ	kə-məŋ	*ha/kə-məŋ
sleep	rəm	rəm	rəm	*rəm
sleepy	rəm-bin	rəm-bin	rəm-biŋ	*rəm-bin
smell	nam	nam	naŋ	*nam
smoke	bɛ-kɨɨ	bai-kəə	bɛɛ-kɨɨ	*baikɨɨ (?)
son-in-law	a-bɔʔ	buaʔ	a-bua	*buaʔ
stand	tʃin	tʃin	tʃiŋ	*tʃin
star	[haNwaiʔ]	[hadaŋ]	[hagaik]	
stone	ka-lɨŋ	ka-huŋ (ka-ɬuŋ)	[kəbɻaa]	*ka-ɬuŋ (?)
sun	hamii	hamii	krii	*PFX-ńii
sweet	a-pin	a-pin	a-piŋ	*a-pin
swell	pən	pən	pəik	*pən̄
taro	tʃjaʔ	tʃjaʔ	tʃua	*tʃuaʔ
tasty/savory	(a-jim)	a-rjem	a-rjep	*a-rjem̄
that	tɛɛ	tai	tɛɛ	*tai
thick (book)	a-pən	a-pən	a-pik	*apən̄ (?)
thin (book)	a-tsap	(a-tʃjam)	a-tʃap	*a-tʃjam̄
this	hɨŋ	həŋ	həŋ	*həŋ
tongue	a-lyi	jui	(a-rue)	*a-lui (?)
tooth	kə-tɔN	tuaŋ	kə-tuaŋ	*kə-tuaŋ
thorn	mə-zuN	mə-ʒuŋ	kə-zjoŋ	*mə/kə-zoŋ
up	kuN	kuŋ	kuŋ	*kuŋ
Urtica fibres	ʃaN	hɻaŋ	hɻak	*sjaŋ̄
vomit	muɛʔ	muai	muɛ	*muaiʔ
war	mɔʔ	muaʔ	mua	*muaʔ
warm	a-ləm	a-ləm	a-ləp	*a-ləm̄
water	kɔɔ	kua	kua	*kua
weave (on loom)	ɛʔ-rɔʔ	ai-ruaʔ	aikrua	*at-ruaʔ
wet	a-ʃam	a-hɻam	a-hjap	*a-hjam̄ (?)
what	hɛɛ	hai	[hii]	
white	a-rjuN	a-rjuŋ	a-rjuŋ	*a-rjuŋ
wife	a-ʒuu	a-zjoo	a-zou	*a-zjoo (?)
wing	a-ʒuiN	a-ʒun	a-juik	*a-jun̄
woman	[məruu]	a-mui	a-mui	*a-mui
