= Karma Wangchu =

Indian politician and social worker

Member of the Arunachal Pradesh Legislative Assembly
- In office 1978–1994
- Constituency: Tawang

Minister for Health, Transport and Co-operation, Arunachal Pradesh
- In office 18 September 1979 – 3 November 1979

Personal details
- Born: 27 September 1936 Seru, Tawang district, North-East Frontier Agency, British India (now Arunachal Pradesh, India)
- Died: October 20, 2022 (aged 86) Tawang, Arunachal Pradesh, India
- Party: Indian National Congress
- Spouse: Yes
- Children: Six sons, three daughters (including Jambey Wangdi)
- Occupation: Politician, Social Worker
- Awards: Padma Shri (2023, posthumous)

Karma Wangchu (27 September 1936–20 October 2022) was an Indian politician and social worker from Arunachal Pradesh. He was known for his contributions to the preservation of Monpa culture and traditions, as well as philanthropic work, particularly in providing education to underprivileged children in border areas. He served four terms as a Member of the Legislative Assembly (MLA) for the Tawang constituency from 1978 to 1994 and was a Minister in the Arunachal Pradesh government. In 2023, he was posthumously awarded the Padma Shri, India's fourth-highest civilian honor, for his contributions in the field of social work.

== Early life and career ==
Karma Wangchu was born on 27 September 1936, in Seru village, Tawang district, then part of the North-East Frontier Agency (NEFA), British India. He did not receive formal education.

Wangchu began his career with the Assam Border Police (NEFA Police) from 1959 to 1960. He then served as a Junior Intelligence Officer-II in the Subsidiary Intelligence Bureau (SIB) from 1960 to 1976. During the 1962 Indo-China war, he was on active duty, tasked with intelligence gathering attached to the Indian Army in areas like Bumla, Mago-Thingbu, and Zemithang. For his distinguished and meritorious service during the war, he received a certificate and a cash award. He was also awarded a silver medal for meritorious service in 1972. At the age of 16, he undertook a trip to Lhasa on foot and had an audience with His Holiness the 14th Dalai Lama at the Potala Palace.

Karma Wangchu was married and had six sons and three daughters. One of his sons, Jambey Wangdi, serves as the Chairman of the Department of Karmik and Adhyatmik (DoKA), Government of Arunachal Pradesh. The Dalai Lama visited Wangchu's residence in Tawang in 1997 and 2003.

== Political career ==
Karma Wangchu was elected to the Arunachal Pradesh Legislative Assembly from the Tawang constituency for four consecutive terms, serving from 1978 to 1994. He also served as a Pro-Tem Speaker of the Legislative Assembly. During the Tomo Riba government, Wangchu held the portfolios of Minister for Health, Transport, and Co-operation. He retired from active politics in 1994, having reportedly never lost an election in his career.

== Social work and cultural preservation ==
After retiring from politics, Wangchu dedicated himself to social service. In 1998, he founded the Choephelling Public School in Tawang, which means 'Land of flourishing virtues'. The school provides free education and residential facilities to underprivileged children, primarily orphans, destitute children, and those from poor families in border villages such as Mago, Thingbu, and Zemithang. It has supported over 1,256 children. He also funded the education of 18 students from poor families in extreme border areas from his pension savings.

Wangchu was a devout follower of the Dalai Lama and his teachings of compassion. He was actively involved in philanthropic activities and worked towards the preservation and promotion of the Monpa culture and traditions in the border areas of Arunachal Pradesh. He was also a supporter of the Tibetan people and their cause, and was one of the forefront supporters of the central government's decision to implement the Tibetan Rehabilitation Policy in 2014 in Arunachal Pradesh. His composition 'Himalayan Range Unit Tawang' reflects his commitment to the cause of Tibet.

== Legacy and death ==
Karma Wangchu died on 20 October 2022, at the age of 86, in Tawang. He is remembered as a pioneering leader who worked to bring government policies and development to remote areas of Tawang district. Arunachal Pradesh Chief Minister Pema Khandu described him as "an institution in himself, and a great source of wisdom, vision and guidance."
