= Songlin =

Songlin may refer to:

- Songrim, a city in North Hwanghae Province, North Korea
- Songlin language, an unclassified Sino-Tibetan language of Zayu County, Tibet, China
- Songlin, Meichuan, a village-level division of Hubei, China
