= Pham Kho Sowai =

Pham-Kho-Sowai (a harvesting festival) is a popular festival of the Bugun people. It is now celebrated on a fixed date, starting on 10 September every year. Pham-Kho literally means "mountain" (pham) and "river" or "water" ("kho" is a polysemy for any form of water), considered by the Bugun people to be vital components required for women's survival.
