= Mishmi languages =

The Mishmi languages consist of a few Sino-Tibetan languages spoken by the Mishmi people of Tibet, China and Arunachal Pradesh, India. They do not belong to a single branch or genetic grouping, but are rather a cultural grouping of various Sino-Tibetan languages that are not closely related to each other. The languages are:

- Mishmi
  - Digaro languages (Northern Mishmi)
    - Idu Mishmi language
    - Digaro Mishmi language (Taraon)
  - Miju languages (Southern Mishmi)
    - Miju language (Midzu, Kaman)
    - Zakhring language (Meyor)

== See also ==
- Mishmi (disambiguation)
- Arunachal languages
- Songlin language
