= Bugun =

Ethnic group living in Northeast India

Bugun people
Total population
- 3,000

Regions with significant populations
- India (Arunachal Pradesh)

Languages
- Bugun language

Religion
- Animism, Hinduism, Christianity

The Buguns (formerly Khowa) are one of the earliest recognized schedule tribes of India, majority of them, inhabiting the Singchung Sub-Division of West Kameng District of Arunachal Pradesh. Buguns live in several exogamous clans. Traditionally, the predominant occupation was agriculture, supported with other allied activities like fishing and hunting, cattle rearing etc. Buguns have their own folklore, songs, dances, music and rituals. A rare bird, the Bugun liocichla, was named after the tribe.

They live mainly in the subtropical Singchung Administrative Sub-Division of West Kameng district with its, almost whole, native population under 6-Thrizino-Buragaon ST Assembly Constituency of the state of Arunachal Pradesh.

== Language ==
The Bugun language, one of the Bugunish/Kamenic languages under Kho-Bwa languages, is considered endangered by UNESCO, with only around 10,000 speakers mainly concentrated in the Kameng district of Arunachal Pradesh, India.

== Religion ==
The Buguns are traditionally followers of the animistic religion However, the early 20th century witnessed the gradual penetration of some dominant religions like Buddhism (Mahayana), particularly from the neighbouring ethnic group Sherdukpen, and Hinduism. Some have come under Tibetan Buddhist influence. Profound Buddhist influence has led to the adoption of many Buddhist rituals and the invitation of Buddhist lamas to participate in their communal rituals. As a result, many Buguns declared themselves as Buddhist in censuses.

Pham Kho Sowai is the harvesting festival of the Buguns. It is now celebrated on a fixed date, starting on 10 September.
