= CHUG (AM) =

Community radio station in Stephenville, Newfoundland and Labrador, Canada

- Stephenville, Newfoundland and Labrador; Canada
- Broadcast area: Stephenville area
- Frequency: 740 kHz (AM)

Programming
- Format: Community radio

Ownership
- Owner: Troubador Radio Society, Inc.

History
- First air date: c. 1990

Technical information
- Class: LP
- Power: 40 watts

CHUG is a community radio station that operates at 740 AM in Stephenville, Newfoundland and Labrador, Canada.

Owned by Troubador Radio Society Inc. the station was licensed by the Canadian Radio-television and Telecommunications Commission (CRTC) in 1990.
