= Chayangtajo =

Coordinates: 27.680°N 93.134°E

Chayangtajo is a small town situated on a picturesque hilltop overseeing the Himalayas. Chayangtajo is one of the oldest towns established in the Indian state of Arunachal Pradesh. It is located in the East Kameng district, 37.50 km aerial distance towards north and 81 km via road from the District headquarter Seppa. Chayangtajo is the place where the Kameng river (known as Bharali in Assam) originates from the Himalayas.

Chayangtajo is one of the 60 constituencies of the Legislative Assembly of Arunachal Pradesh. The Constituency is consist of four Circles viz. Pipu, Sawa, Gyawepurang and Chayangtajo as its HQ. The administrative head of Chayantajo Circle is Additional Deputy Commissioner (ADC). It is inhabited by Nyishi and Puroiks. The current MLA (2019–24) of 9-Chayangtajo constituency is Hayeng Mangfi. His predecessors are Sri Kameng Dolo (5 terms) and Karya Bagang (2 terms).

== See also ==
List of constituencies of Arunachal Pradesh Legislative Assembly
