= Tawang Assembly constituency =

Constituency of the Arunachal Pradesh legislative assembly in India

Coordinates: 27.586°N 91.859°E

Tawang
- Constituency No. 2 for the Arunachal Pradesh Legislative Assembly

Constituency details
- Country: India
- Region: Northeast India
- State: Arunachal Pradesh
- District: Tawang
- Lok Sabha constituency: Arunachal West
- Established: 1990
- Total electors: 10,649
- Reservation: ST

Member of Legislative Assembly
- 11th Arunachal Pradesh Legislative Assembly
- Incumbent Namgey Tsering
- Party: PPA
- Alliance: NDA
- Elected year: 2024

Tawang Assembly constituency is one of the 60 assembly constituencies of Arunachal Pradesh, a northeastern state of India. It is part of Arunachal West Lok Sabha constituency.

== Members of the Legislative Assembly ==
Election	Member	Party
1990	Thupten Tempa	Indian National Congress
1995	Thupten Tempa	Indian National Congress
1999	Thupten Tempa	Indian National Congress
2004	Tsewang Dhondup	Indian National Congress
2009	Tsewang Dhondup	Indian National Congress
2014	Tsering Tashi	Independent politician
2019	Tsering Tashi	Bharatiya Janata Party
2024	Namgey Tsering	National People's Party
2024	Namgey Tsering	People's Party of Arunachal

== Election results ==
=== Assembly Election 2024 ===
2024 Arunachal Pradesh Legislative Assembly election: Tawang
Party	Candidate	Votes	%	±%
NPP	Namgey Tsering	4,667	55.60%	New
BJP	Tsering Dorjee	3,671	43.73%	▼29.03
NOTA	None of the Above	56	0.67%	▼0.92
Margin of victory		996	11.87%	▼35.25
Turnout		8,394	78.82%	▲2.36
Registered electors		10,649		▲6.81
NPP gain from BJP		Swing	▼17.17	

=== Assembly Election 2019 ===
2019 Arunachal Pradesh Legislative Assembly election: Tawang
Party	Candidate	Votes	%	±%
BJP	Tsering Tashi	5,547	72.77%	New
INC	Thupten Tempa	1,955	25.65%	▲8.47
NOTA	Nota	121	1.59%	New
Margin of victory		3,592	47.12%	▼16.37
Turnout		7,623	76.46%	▼2.49
Registered electors		9,970		▼1.11
BJP gain from Independent		Swing	▼7.90	

=== Assembly Election 2014 ===
2014 Arunachal Pradesh Legislative Assembly election: Tawang
Party	Candidate	Votes	%	±%
Independent	Tsering Tashi	6,421	80.67%	New
INC	Tsewang Dhondup	1,367	17.17%	New
NOTA	None of the Above	172	2.16%	New
Margin of victory		5,054	63.49%	
Turnout		7,960	78.95%	▲78.95
Registered electors		10,082		▲2.75
Independent gain from INC		Swing		

=== Assembly Election 2009 ===
2009 Arunachal Pradesh Legislative Assembly election: Tawang
Party	Candidate	Votes	%	±%
INC	Tsewang Dhondup	Unopposed		
Registered electors		9,812		▲14.48
INC hold		Swing		

=== Assembly Election 2004 ===
2004 Arunachal Pradesh Legislative Assembly election: Tawang
Party	Candidate	Votes	%	±%
INC	Tsewang Dhondup	3,786	60.80%	New
Independent	Thupten Tempa	2,441	39.20%	New
Margin of victory		1,345	21.60%	
Turnout		6,227	70.05%	▲72.65
Registered electors		8,571		▲14.65
INC hold		Swing		

=== Assembly Election 1999 ===
1999 Arunachal Pradesh Legislative Assembly election: Tawang
Party	Candidate	Votes	%	±%
INC	Thupten Tempa	Unopposed		
Registered electors		7,476		▲10.04
INC hold		Swing		

=== Assembly Election 1995 ===
1995 Arunachal Pradesh Legislative Assembly election: Tawang
Party	Candidate	Votes	%	±%
INC	Thupten Tempa	3,024	51.79%	New
Independent	Theg Tse Rinpoche	2,815	48.21%	New
Margin of victory		209	3.58%	
Turnout		5,839	87.50%	▲85.94
Registered electors		6,794		▲4.46
INC hold		Swing		

=== Assembly Election 1990 ===
1990 Arunachal Pradesh Legislative Assembly election: Tawang
Party	Candidate	Votes	%	±%
INC	Thupten Tempa	Unopposed		
Registered electors		6,504		
INC win (new seat)				

== See also ==
- Tawang
- Tawang district
- List of constituencies of Arunachal Pradesh Legislative Assembly
