= Tsewang Dhondup =

Indian politician

Tsewang Dhondup (born 1977) is a politician from Tawang in the Tawang district of Arunachal Pradesh. He belongs to the Indian National Congress Party and has been a member of the Arunachal Pradesh Legislative Assembly since 2014.

== Electoral performance ==
Election	Constituency	Party	Result	Votes %	Opposition Candidate	Opposition Party	Opposition vote %	Ref
2014	Tawang	INC	Lost	17.17%	Tsering Tashi	Independent	80.67%	
2009	Tawang	INC	Won	Unoppsed				
2004	Tawang	INC	Won	60.80%	Thupten Tempa	Independent	39.20%	
