= Tsering Tashi =

Indian politician

Member of Arunachal Pradesh Legislative Assembly of Tawang
- In office 2014–2024
- Preceded by: Tsewang Dhondup
- Succeeded by: Namgey Tsering

Personal details
- Party: BJP
- Relations: Pema Khandu (brother); Dorjee Khandu (father)
- Occupation: Public Leader
- Profession: social service

Tsering Tashi is an Indian politician who served as the MLA of Tawang Assembly constituency from 2014 to 2024. He is a member of the Bharatiya Janata Party.

== Career ==
He was first elected as a member of Legislative Assembly of Arunachal Pradesh from the Tawang Constituency in the 2014 Arunachal Pradesh Legislative Assembly election as an independent candidate, and was successfully re-elected in the 2019 election as a BJP candidate.

== Electoral performance ==
Election	Constituency	Party	Result	Votes %	Opposition Candidate	Opposition Party	Opposition vote %	Ref
2019	Tawang	BJP	Won	72.77%	Thupten Tempa	INC	25.65%	
2014	Tawang	Independent	Won	80.67%	Tsewang Dhondup	INC	17.17%	
