= Chug language =

Language spoken in Northeast India

Chug
- Duhumbi
- Region: Arunachal Pradesh
- Ethnicity: Monpa people
- Native speakers: 600 (2017)
- Language family: Sino-Tibetan: Kho-Bwa; Chug

Language codes
- ISO 639-3: cvg
- Glottolog: chug1252

Chug (also called Chugpa or Duhumbi) is a Kho-Bwa language of West Kameng district, Arunachal Pradesh in India. It is a dialect of the same language as Lish and Gompatse.

Chug is spoken only in Chug village (population 483 in 1971), located a few miles from Dirang (Blench & Post 2011:3).

Chug is spoken in Duhumbi village. Despite speaking languages closely related to Mey (Sherdukpen), the people identify as Monpa, not Mey.

According to Lieberherr & Bodt (2017), Chug is spoken by 600 people in 3 main villages.

== Phonology ==
Consonants
		Labial	Alveolar	Palatal	Velar	Glottal
Plosive	oral	p b	t d		k ɡ	
Plosive	aspirated	pʰ	tʰ		kʰ	
Affricate	oral		ts	tɕ dʑ		
Affricate	aspirated		tsʰ	tɕʰ		
Fricative			s z	ɕ ʑ		h
Nasal		m	n	ɲ	ŋ	
Approximant		w	r, l	j		

Vowels
	Front	Central	Back
High	i		u
Mid	e		o
Low		a	
