= Namgey Tsering =

Member of Arunachal Pradesh Legislative Assembly
- Incumbent
- Assumed office 1 June 2024
- Preceded by: Tsering Tashi
- Constituency: Tawang

Personal details
- Party: National People's Party

Namgey Tsering is an Indian politician from Arunachal Pradesh belonging to the National People's Party. He is a member of the 11th Arunachal Pradesh Legislative Assembly from the Tawang constituency. He was first elected in the 2024 Arunachal Pradesh Legislative Assembly election, winning over the BJP's candidate Tsering Dorjee.
