= Songlin language =

Sino-Tibetan language

Songlin
- sang3lin1bu1lo3gye1
- Pronunciation: [sɑŋ˧˩lin˥pu˥lo˧˩ɟe˥]
- Native to: China
- Region: Shangchayu Town, Zayu County, Nyingchi Prefecture, Tibet
- Native speakers: 1,000 (2019)
- Language family: Sino-Tibetan? Isolate?: (unclassified); Songlin
- Writing system: Pinyin (proposed)

Language codes
- ISO 639-3: None (mis)
- Glottolog: song1316

Songlin (Chinese: 松林语) is a divergent, unclassified Sino-Tibetan or isolate language spoken in Zayu County, Nyingchi Prefecture, Tibet. A linguistic description of Songlin has been published in a monograph by Song (2019).

== Names ==
Songlin speakers refer to their language as sang3lin1bu1lo3gye1, and to Songlin village as sang3lin1 (Song 2019:6).

== History of documentation ==
Jiang Huo (江获) first learned about the existence of Songlin while doing research on Idu during the 2000s, when local Idu people in the Upper Chayu Town area reported that the "Songleng Tuyu" 松冷土语 was spoken nearby. After preliminary data was collected in 2014, intensive field work was conducted during the summers of 2015–2017 by a Chinese research team led by Li Daqin (李大勤) (Song 2019:13). A monograph documenting the Songlin language, Xizang Chayu Songlin yu (西藏察隅松林语), was written by Song Cheng (宋成) and submitted for publication in 2018. The book was released in 2019.

== Demographics ==
The language is spoken in Songlin Village 松林村, Upper Chayu Town 上察隅镇 by approximately 1,000 people. The local lingua franca of the area is the Zayu dialect of Khams Tibetan. Some Songlin speakers can speak Idu and gSerkhu, both of which are also spoken in Upper Chayu Town 上察隅镇.

Songlin village is located on the western banks of the Kangrigarbo Qu (贡日嘎布曲) river, several kilometers to the northwest of the Upper Chayu/Shangchayu Town (ʐoŋ˧˩ȶø˥ in Songlin; located further downstream on the same river). Some nearby villages include Gonggu 巩固, Xiba 西巴 (ɕi˥tɑ˥ in Songlin), and Rongyu 荣玉 to the north, and Zongba 宗巴 and Migu 米古 to the south (Song 2019:6).

== Classification ==
Song & Lin (2020) shows that Songlin is not closely related to any of the surrounding Tibeto-Burman languages and cannot be classified as a Tibetic language. A computational phylogenetic study by Jiang (2023) also demonstrates the divergent position of Songlin. Songlin and the Mishmi languages all are spoken in Zayu County, but Songlin is not closely related to any of them.

Roger Blench (2023) considers Songlin to be a language isolate, as with the other Arunachal languages.

Engels and Bodt (2025) classify Songlin as one of the Chamdo languages, which in turn they classify as West Gyalrongic, making Songlin a close relative to Tangut. They also posit prehistoric contact between Songlin and the Hmong–Mien languages.

== Phonology ==
=== Consonants ===
The consonant inventory of Songlin is as follows (Song 2019:18–19).

		Labial	Alveolar	Retroflex	Alveolo-palatal	Palatal	Velar	Glottal
Plosive	voiceless	p	t		ȶ	c	k	
Plosive	aspirated	pʰ	tʰ		ȶʰ	cʰ	kʰ	
Plosive	voiced	b	d		ȡ	ɟ	g	
Nasal	voiceless	m̥	n̥		ȵ̥		ŋ̊	
Nasal	voiced	m	n		ȵ		ŋ	
Fricative	voiceless		s	ʂ	ɕ			h
Fricative	voiced		z	ʐ	ʑ			
Affricate	voiceless		ts	tʂ	tɕ			
Affricate	aspirated		tsʰ	tʂʰ	tɕʰ			
Affricate	voiced		dz	dʐ	dʑ			
Approximant		w				j		
Lateral	voiceless		ɬ					
Lateral	voiced		l					

Consonant clusters include: nb, nd, nȡ, nɟ, ng, ndz, ndʑ, ndʐ, pʐ, pʰʐ, bʐ, nbʐ, kʐ, kʰʐ, gʐ, nbʐ, ngʐ. /n/- is treated as part of consonant clusters, rather than as part of prenasalized initial consonants.

Note: In Sinology, ȵ is roughly equivalent to [ɲ] or [nʲ], while ȶ and ȡ can typically be transcribed as [tʲ] and [dʲ], respectively, although in practice they can actually be equivalent to [tʃ] or [dʒ] instead, or other similar affricates. Also, ɕ and ʑ often, but not always, correspond to [ʃ] and [ʒ] in IPA transcriptions used by non-Sinologists. For further information, see obsolete and nonstandard symbols in the International Phonetic Alphabet.

=== Vowels ===
There are 12 vowels: i, y, ɯ, u, e, ø, o, ə, ɛ, ɑ, ɿ, ʮ (Song 2019:21–22).

Songlin has 5 diphthongs: ui, ɯi, ou, ie, iɛ.

Note that ɿ [ɨ] is used by Sinologists, as well as ʮ ([ʉ], [ɹ̩ʷ] or [z̩ʷ]), which is a labialized syllabic denti-alveolar approximant used by Sinologists.

=== Tones ===
There are three tones in Songlin.

Tone number	Pitch value	Chao tones	Description
1	/˥/	/55/	high level (高平)
2	/˨˦/	/24/	mid rising (中升)
3	/˧˩/	/31/	low falling (低降)

About 50% of all words in Songlin have the high level tone /˥/ (/55/), while the mid rising /˨˦/ (/24) and low falling /˧˩/ (/31/) tones are each found in approximately 25% of all Songlin words (Song 2019:24).

== Script ==
Song (2019:30–32) proposes a pinyin-based script for Songlin.

Consonants
Songlin script	IPA
a	ɑ
b	p
c	tsʰ
d	t
e	ə
f	f
g	k
h	h
i	i
j	tɕ
k	kʰ
l	l
m	m
n	n
o	o
p	pʰ
q	tɕʰ
r	ʐ
s	s
t	tʰ
u	u
v	y
w	w
x	ɕ
y	j
z	ts

Consonant clusters
Songlin script	IPA
nbb	nb
ndd	nd
nddy	nȡ
nggy	nɟ
ngg	ng
nz	ndz
nj	ndʑ
nzh	ndʐ
br	pʐ
pr	pʰʐ
bbr	bʐ
gr	kʐ
kr	kʰʐ
ggr	gʐ
nbbr	nbʐ
nggr	ngʐ

Vowels
Songlin script	IPA
a	ɑ
e	ə
ee	e
eee	ɛ
i	i
ii	ɿ
iii	ʮ
o	o
oo	ø
u	u
uu	ɯ
v	y

Rimes
Songlin script	IPA
in	in
ing	iŋ
eng	əŋ
eeen	ɛn
an	ɑn
ang	ɑŋ
uun	ɯn
uung	ɯŋ
ian	iɛn
ong	oŋ

Tones are transcribed using the numerals 1, 2, and 3 (see the Tones section above):

Tones
Songlin script	Pitch value
1	/55/ (high level)
2	/24/ (mid rising)
3	/31/ (low falling)

Example phrase (Song 2019:33):

ga1sii1 ga1sii1 dyv1 neng3
'once upon a time'/'a very long time ago' (很久很久以前)

== Morphology ==
Some common prefixes in Songlin are (Song 2019:43):

- ɑ˧˩-: nominal prefix
- mɑ˧˩-: nominal prefix
- kə˧˩-: used before some verbs, some body parts, and various nouns

Some suffixes are:

- -pɑ˥: used with human-related terms, body parts, and others
- -tso˥: 'son' (儿); masculine/diminutive, used to mark an animate noun (person or animal) as male, juvenile, or small

Reduplication is commonly used to form new nouns (Song 2019:45–46).

== Pronouns ==
The Songlin pronouns are (Song 2019:134):

		singular	dual	plural
1st person	INCL	ŋɑ˥	ɑ˨˦kʰə˥ȵi˥	ɑ˨˦se˥
1st person	EXCL	ŋɑ˥	ŋɑ˧˩kʰə˥ȵi˥	ŋɑ˧˩se˥
2nd person		nu˥	nə˧˩kʰə˥ȵi˥	nə˧˩se˥
3rd person		pu˨˦	pə˧˩kʰə˥ȵi˥	pə˧˩se˥

== Interrogatives ==
Songlin interrogatives are (Song 2019:140):

Gloss	Songlin
who?	ʃɑŋ˧˩ŋɑ˥
what?; which?	cʰe˥/hɑ˧˩mi˥
when?	ȵɛn˨˦kʰɑ˧˩
where?	hɑ˧˩ndɑ˥
how many?	hɑ˧˩ȶi˥
how?	hɑ˧˩nbo˥

== Sentence examples ==
The following Songlin sentence examples are from Yan (Song 2020:656). Songlin has SOV word order.

ŋɑ˥ tɕi˧˩tɕi˥ tɕʰɑŋ˥ koŋ˥ nəŋ˧˩
1.SG water drink PROG PRT
I am drinking water.

pin˥wu˥ kʰu˧˩mu˥ ju˥ koŋ˥ nəŋ˧˩
sky rain fall PROG PRT
Rain is falling. (lit. ''The sky is falling rain.'')

== Vocabulary ==
The following are Songlin words cited from Song (2020).

Chinese gloss	English gloss	Songlin
一	one	tɕi˧˩tɑ˥
二	two	kʰɑ˧˩ȵi˥
三	three	sɯŋ˥
四	four	ʑi˨˦
五	five	po˧˩ŋoŋ˨˦
六	six	tʂʰɯ˨˦
七	seven	ȵ̥in˨˦
八	eight	pu˧˩ndʑe˨˦
九	nine	gu˨˦
风	wind	kʐi˨˦
虹	rainbow	zɑ˥
右	right (side)	tʂoŋ˥lɑ˥
外面	outside	pɑ˧˩tɕy˨˦
跳蚤	flea	kɑ˧˩ji˥
(牛)角	horn (of cattle)	goŋ˨˦kʰʐɿ˥
尾巴	tail	ndʑoŋ˥mɑŋ˥
脖子	neck	kɑ˥loŋ˥
背	back	ci˨˦tsʰɿ˥
(树)叶子	leaf (of tree)	kʰɑ˧˩pɑ˨˦
汗	sweat	tsʰɑ¹³pɑ˨˦
尿	urine	tɕʰi˧˩li˥
官	government official	ngə˥tʂʰɿ˥
孙子	grandson	noŋ˧˩tɕy˥
鞋	shoe	ku˧˩ȵu˥
刀子	knife	nba˧˩ju˥
船	boat	tʂɿ˧˩dzin˥
鬼	ghost, spirit	tɕʰo˨˦
走	walk	ci˥
飞	fly (v.)	ku˨˦
吃	eat	ndzo˥
烤	roast, bake	pu˥
拔	pull	pʰʐo˨˦
捆	tie (v.)	pɯi˥
睡	sleep	ŋoŋ˨˦
敢	dare	pin˥
他	he	pu˨˦
好	good	ȵe˨˦ȵe˥
小	small	kɑ˧˩tsɛ˥
旧	old (of things)	bi˨˦
很	very	ʐɛ˨˦
星星	star	kɑ˥mɑ˥
地、土	earth, soil	pʐo˨˦
山	mountain	ʐɿ˨˦
金子	gold	sie˥
水獭	otter	nɑ˥sɛn˥
毛	hair (body)	n̥oŋ˨˦
柱子	pillar	kɑ˥wɑ˥
针	needle	kʰɛ˨˦
布	cloth	ʐe˨˦
寺	temple (Buddhist)	nɟø˥nba˥
镰刀	sickle	ɕin˥koŋ˥
锯子	saw (tool)	su˥li˥
绳子	rope	nbɑ˧˩je˨˦
听	listen	ndʑo˥
大	big	hɑ˥ndu˥
高	high, tall	sen˥
你	you (sg.)	nu˥
干净	clean	ɕɑŋ˥ngʐɑŋ˥
软的	soft	ȵɛ˨˦ȵɛ˨˦
黄的	yellow	sɛ˥sɛ˥
轻的	light (weight)	jɑŋ˨˦jɑŋ˥
新的	new	ɕi˧˩tso˨˦
桥	bridge	dɑŋ˨˦
火柴	firewood	mi˧˩tʂʰe˥
树	tree	tɕʰɑŋ˨˦
