= Lish language =

Language spoken in Northeast India

Lish
- Lishpa, Khispi
- Region: Arunachal Pradesh
- Ethnicity: Lishipa
- Native speakers: 1,500 (2017)
- Language family: Sino-Tibetan: Kho-Bwa; Lish

Language codes
- ISO 639-3: lsh
- Glottolog: lish1235

Lish (also called Lishpa or Khispi) is a Kho-Bwa language of West Kameng district, Arunachal Pradesh in India. It is a dialect of the same language as Chug and Gompatse.

The Lish (population 1,567 in 1981) live in Dirang village, a few miles from Chug village, and in Gompatse. The Gompatse variety is not Lish proper, but is rather a lect closely related to Lish.

Lish is also spoken in Khispi village. Despite speaking languages closely related to Mey (Sherdukpen), the people identify as Monpa, not Mey.

According to Lieberherr & Bodt (2017), Lish is spoken by 1,500 people in 3 main villages.

== Phonology ==
Consonants
		Labial	Alveolar	Palatal	Velar	Uvular	Glottal
Plosive	oral	p b	t d		k ɡ	q ɢ	
Plosive	aspirated	pʰ	tʰ		kʰ	qʰ	
Affricate	oral			tɕ dʑ			
Affricate	aspirated			tɕʰ			
Fricative			s z	ɕ ʑ			h
Nasal		m	n	ɲ	ŋ	ɴ	
Approximant		w	r, l	j			

Vowels
	Front	Central	Back
High	i		u
Mid	e		o
Low		a	
