= Sartang language =

Language spoken in Northeast India

Sartang
- But(pa)
- Native to: India
- Region: Arunachal Pradesh
- Native speakers: 1,000 (2005)
- Language family: Sino-Tibetan: Kho-Bwa; Mey–Sartang; Sartang

Language codes
- ISO 639-3: onp
- Glottolog: sart1249

Sartang is a small language of India. It is one of the Kho-Bwa languages, closest to Sherdukpen (50–60% lexical similarity). Varieties include Sartang of Jergaon and Sartang of Rahung (Blench 2015).

== Distribution ==
Sartang (Boot Monpa) is spoken in the villages of Khoitam, Rahung, Namku-thangka (Salari), and Boot (Jerigaon) Khoina, West Kameng District (Dondrup 2004:1). There were 2,986 Sartang people as of 1996.

The Ethnologue lists Jerigaon, Sellary, Khoitam, Rahung, Darbu and Khoina villages in Nafra and Dirang circles, West Kameng district.

== Varieties ==
According to Roger Blench (2015), Sartang is a cover term referring to various languages spoken in 11 villages southeast of Dirang in Nafra and Dirang circles in West Kameng District. There are 4 varieties total, and only Sartang of Rahung and Sartang of Jergaon have been documented.

Lieberherr & Bodt (2017) list the following varieties.

- Rahung: spoken in Rahung village and nearby hamlets. Approximately 600 speakers.
- Khoitam: spoken in two main villages and nearby hamlets. Approximately 500 speakers.
- Jerigaon: spoken in Jerigaon village. Approximately 400 speakers.
- Khoina: spoken in Khoina village and nearby hamlets. Approximately 500 speakers.
