= Kho-Bwa languages =

Language family of northeast India

Kho-Bwa
- Kamengic; Bugunish
- Geographic distribution: Arunachal Pradesh
- Linguistic classification: Sino-Tibetan: Kho-Bwa
- Subdivisions: Sherdukpen; Sartang; Chug (Duhumbi); Lish (Khispi); ? Puroik; ? Bugun

Language codes
- Glottolog: khob1235

The Kho-Bwa languages, also known as Kamengic, are a small family of languages, or pair of families, spoken in Arunachal Pradesh, northeast India. The name Kho-Bwa was originally proposed by George van Driem (2001). It is based on the reconstructed words *kho ("water") and *bwa ("fire"). Blench (2011) suggests the name Kamengic, from the Kameng area of Arunachal Pradesh. Alternatively, Anderson (2014) refers to Kho-Bwa as Northeast Kamengic.

Both Van Driem and Blench group the Sherdukpen (or Mey), Lishpa (or Khispi), Chug (Duhumbi) and Sartang languages together. These form a language cluster and are clearly related. The pair of Sulung (or Puroik) and Khowa (or Bugun) languages are included in the family by Van Driem (2001) but provisionally treated as a second family by Blench (2024).

These languages have traditionally been placed in the Tibeto-Burman group by the Linguistic Survey of India. Jackson Sun, George van Driem, and multiple handbooks and language classification databases after them also label Kho-Bwa languages as Tibeto-Burman or otherwise Sino-Tibetan. Roger Blench, however, does not accept a Sino-Tibetan origin of these languages, claiming that similarities to such could instead be due to an areal effect.

The entire language family has about 15,000 speakers (including Puroik) or about 10,000 speakers (excluding Puroik), according to estimates made during the 2000s.

Word lists and sociolinguistic surveys of Kho-Bwa languages have also been conducted by Abraham, et al. (2018).

== Classification ==
The internal structure of the Kho-Bwa group of languages is as follows. The similarities between Puroik–Bugun and Sherdukpen/Mey are sporadic and may be due to contact. Lieberherr (2015) considers Puroik to be a Tibeto-Burman language, which would imply that at least Bugun is as well.

Blench & Post (2024)

- Puroik–Bugun
  - Puroik (Sulung)
  - Bugun (Khowa)
- Mey (Mö) [dialect cluster]
  - Sherdukpen [2 languages]
    - Shergaon
    - Rupa (Mö)
  - Sartang (But Monpa) [2 languages]
    - Rahung
    - Jergaon
  - Chug–Lish [1 language]
    - Khispi (Lish)
    - Gompatse
    - Duhumbi (Chug)

=== Lieberherr & Bodt (2017) ===
Lieberherr & Bodt (2017) consider Puroik to be a Kho-Bwa language, and classify the Kho-Bwa languages as follows.

- Kho-Bwa
  - Puroik
  - Bugun
  - Western Kho-Bwa
    - Sherdukpen, Sartang
    - Chug (Duhumbi), Lish (Khispi)

=== Tresoldi et al. (2022) ===
Based on computational phylogenetic analyses from Tresoldi et al. (2022), the phylogenetic tree of Kho-Bwa is roughly as follows:

- Kho-Bwa
  - Western
    - Duhumbi–Khispi (Chug–Lish): Duhumbi (Chug), Khispi (Lish)
    - Mey–Sartang: Shergaon, Rupa, Jerigaon, Khoina, Rahung, Khoitam
  - Bugun
    - A
      - Bulu, Rawa, Kojo Rojo
      - Sario Saria, Lasumpatte, Chayangtajo
    - B
      - Namphri, Kaspi
      - Wangho, Dikhyang
      - Singchaung, Bichom

== Shared characteristics ==
Common characteristics between Western Kho-Bwa and Puroik are given by Lieberherr & Bodt (2017).

=== Prefixes ===
Kho-Bwa languages share the following prefixes:

- *a- in front of adjectives
- *kV- prefix before multiple parts of the head, such as the head itself, eyes, ears, and hair
- Some element in front of the names of a specific subset of objects in the sky, namely the moon, sun, stars, clouds, rain and snow. The prefixes themselves however, although they resemble each other, are not identical; Puroik prefixes *ham- while Western Kho-Bwa prefixes *nam-.

=== Sound changes ===
Kho-Bwa languages share the following sound changes:

- The fortition of Sino-Tibetan initial *m- to *b-.
- Outright loss of initial *s-.

==== Examples ====
In the below tables, the other Sino-Tibetan cognates are taken from Lieberherr & Bodt (2017), but the proto-Western Kho-Bwa forms are taken from Bodt (2024) and the Proto-Puroik forms are from Lieberherr (2015).

Fortition of *m to *b in Kho-Bwa
Word		"fire"	"dream"	"not"	"person"
Kho-Bwa	Proto-Western Kho-Bwa	*baj	*ban	*ba	*bi
Kho-Bwa	Proto-Puroik	*bai	*baŋ̄	*ba	*bii
Other Sino-Tibetan	Proto-Kuki-Chin	*may	*maŋ	—	*mii
Other Sino-Tibetan	Tibetan	me	—	ma	mi

Loss of *s- in Kho-Bwa
Word		"die"	"kill"	"three"
Kho-Bwa	Proto-Western Kho-Bwa	*i	*at	*um
Kho-Bwa	Proto-Puroik	*ii	*at	*ɨm̄
Other Sino-Tibetan	Proto-Kuki-Chin	*thii	*that	*thum
Other Sino-Tibetan	Tibetan	√shi	gsod	gsum

== Vocabulary ==
The following table of Kho-Bwa basic vocabulary items is from Blench (2015). Proto-Western Kho-Bwa (Proto-WKB) reconstructions are from Bodt (2024).

Gloss	Mey (Shergaon)	Mey (Rupa)	Sartang (Jergaon)	Sartang (Rahung)	Lish (Khispi)	Chug (Duhumbi)	Proto-WKB
one	hǎn	han	hèn	hân	hin	hin	*hin
two	ɲǐt	ɲik	nìk	ně	ɲes	niʃ	*nʲis
three	ùŋ	uŋ	ùŋ	ùún	ʔum	om	*um
four	pʰʃì	bsi	sì	psì	pʰəhi	psi	*bli
five	kʰù	kʰu	kʰù	kʰu	kʰa	kʰa	*kʰa
six	ʧùk	kit	ʧìk	ʨěy	ʧʰuʔ	ʧyk	*kʰrʲuk
seven	ʃìt	sit	sìk	sǐ, sě	ʃis	his	*sʲit
eight	sàʤát	sarʤat	sàrgè	sàrʤɛ́	saɾgeʔ	saɾgeʔ	*sar.gʲat
nine	tʰkʰí	dʰikʰi	tʰkʰì	tɛ̀kʰɯ́	ṱʰikʰu	ṱʰikʰu	*da.kʰu
ten	sɔ̀ ̃	sõ	sã̀	sɔ	ʃan	ʃan	*sʷan
head	kʰruk	kʰruk	kʰrǔk	kʰruʔ	kʰoloʔ	kʰloʔ	*kʰa.rok
nose	nupʰuŋ	nəfuŋ	nfùŋ	apʰuŋ	hempoŋ	heŋpʰoŋ	*n̥a.pʰoŋ
eye	khibi	kivi	kábì	kʰaʔby	kʰumu	kʰum	*kʰa.bu
ear	kʰtùŋ	gtʰiŋ	gtʰìŋ	ktèíŋ	kʰutʰuŋ	kʰutʰuŋ	*kʰa.tʰuŋ
tongue	laphõ	lapon	?	le	loi	loi	*luj
tooth	nuthuŋ	tokʧe	mísìŋ	nitʰiŋ	ʃiŋtuŋ	hintuŋ	*n̥a.tʰuŋ
arm	ik	ik	ìk	ik	hu	hut	*qʷut
leg	là	lapon	lɛ̌	lɛ̌	lei	lai	*laj
belly	ʃrìŋ	sliŋ	srìŋ	sriŋ	hiɲiŋ	hiliŋ	*sʲa.rʲiŋ, *n̥a.rʲiŋ
bone	skìk	skik	àhík	skik	ʃukuʃ	ʃukuʃ	*sʲa.kʰrus, *a.kʰrus
blood	hà	ha(a)	hɛ̀	ha	hoi	hoi	*hruj
face	dòŋpù	bo	mi	zə̀í	doʔ	doŋpa	(various)
tooth	ntùŋ	tokʧe	mísìŋ	ptə̀íŋ	ʃiŋtuŋ	hintuŋ	*n̥a.tʰuŋ
stomach	àlà	karbu	ʧàk	phriŋ	hiɲiŋ	hiliŋ	(various)
mouth	ʧàw	nəʧaw	so	ʨʨǒ	hoʧok	kʰoʧu	*-tsʰʷa
rain	ʧuuma	nimi	nʧʰù	ʧuʧuba	namu	namu	*nam.tsʰa, *nam.mu

== See also ==
- Kho-Bwa comparative vocabulary lists (Wiktionary)
