= Bugun language =

Kho-Bwa language of Arunachal Pradesh, India

Bugun
- Khowa
- Native to: India
- Region: Arunachal Pradesh
- Ethnicity: Bugun (Khowa)
- Native speakers: (900 cited 2001)
- Language family: Sino-Tibetan? Isolate?: Kho-Bwa?; Bugun

Language codes
- ISO 639-3: bgg
- Glottolog: bugu1246
- ELP: Bugun

Bugun, also known as Khowa, is a small possible language isolate spoken in Arunachal Pradesh state of India by the Bugun. They numbered about 1,700 in 2011.

== Phonology ==
=== Vowels ===
	Front	Central	Back
Close	i		u
Mid	ɛ		ɔ
Open		ä	

=== Consonants ===
		Labial	Coronal	Retroflex	Palatal	Velar	Post- velar	Glottal
Nasal		m	n					
Stop	voiceless	p	t	ʈ		k		
Stop	voiced	b	d	ɖ		ɡ	ɢ	
Stop	breathy	bʱ	dʱ	ɖʱ		ɡʱ		
Affricate	voiceless		ts	ʈʂ	tɕ			
Affricate	voiced		dz	ɖʐ	dʑ			
Affricate	breathy		dzʱ	ɖʐʱ	dʑʱ			
Fricative	voiceless		s	ʂ	ɕ	x		
Fricative	voiced	v	z	ʐ	ʑ	ɣ		ɦ
Approximant			l ɫ		j			
Rhotic			ɾ					

== Classification ==
Bugun is classified as a Kho-Bwa language in Blench & Post (2013), although Blench (2015) believes Bugun may actually be unrelated to the rest of the Kho-Bwa languages.

== Dialects ==
Lieberherr & Bodt (2017) list the following Bugun dialects along with their numbers of speakers.

- Dikhyang (100 speakers)
- Singchung (680 speakers)
- Wangho (220 speakers)
- Bichom (630 speakers)
- Kaspi (80 speakers)
- Namphri (180 speakers)

== Distribution ==
Bugun is spoken in the following villages in southern West Kameng District, Arunachal Pradesh (Dondrup 1990:iv). The total population numbered 800 in 1981. Names in parentheses are spellings as given in Ethnologue.

- Wanghoo (Wangho)
- Singchung
- Kaspi (New Kaspi)
- Lichini
- Ramo (Ramu)
- Namphri
- Chithu (Situ)
- Sachida (Sachita)
- Pani-Phu
- Ditching (Diching)
- Dikhiyang (Dikiang)
- Bicham (Bichom) (a recently founded hamlet)

Ethnologue also lists Mangopom village. These villages are located on the mountains on both sides of Rupa River.
