= Sherdukpen language =

Language spoken in Northeast India

Sherdukpen
- Mey
- Ngnok
- Region: Assam, Arunachal Pradesh
- Ethnicity: Sherdukpen people
- Native speakers: 5,000 (2019)
- Language family: Sino-Tibetan: Kho-Bwa; Mey–Sartang; Sherdukpen
- Dialects: Shergaon; Tukpen (Rupa)

Language codes
- ISO 639-3: sdp
- Glottolog: sher1257
- ELP: Sherdukpen

Sherdukpen (autonym: Mey) is a small language of India. It is one of the Kho-Bwa languages. There are two distinct varieties, Mey of Shergaon and Mey of Rupa. The name Sherdukpen comes from the words Shergaon and Tukpen (the Monpa name for Rupa) (Blench & Post 2011:3). The language is known to speakers as Mey nyuk.

== Dialects ==
Lieberherr & Bodt (2017) list the following dialects of Sherdukpen.

- Rupa: spoken in Rupa village and two other main villages, as well as nearby hamlets. Likely around 3,000 speakers.
- Shergaon: spoken in Shergaon village. Likely around 1,500 speakers.

== Locations ==
Sherdukpen is spoken in Shergaon, southern West Kameng District, Arunachal Pradesh (Dondrup 1988), located in the Tengapani river valley south of Bomdila.

Ethnologue lists Rupa (Kupa), Sheinthuk (Shergaon), Jigang (Jigaon), and Thungree villages, located south of Bomdi La Range and Tengapani river valleys in West Kameng District, Arunachal Pradesh.
