= Koro language (India) =

Sino-Tibetan language

Koro
- Koro-Aka
- Native to: India
- Region: Arunachal Pradesh, India
- Ethnicity: Koro-Aka
- Native speakers: 1,500 (2011)
- Language family: Sino-Tibetan (possibly): Greater Siangic?; Siangic; Koro

Language codes
- ISO 639-3: jkr
- Glottolog: koro1316
- ELP: Koro (India)

Koro is a language spoken in Arunachal Pradesh, India. It is typically classified as a Sino-Tibetan language, and has some resemblances to Tani farther to the east. It has been argued that Koro is actually part of the Greater Siangic family, independent from but influenced by the Sino-Tibetan family. Koro is spoken by about 1,500 people in the Koro-Aka tribe who are found in East Kameng District, Arunachal Pradesh, northeast India. Few speakers are under 20 years old. The majority of Koro speakers live in bilingual households in which one or more members speak Ako or another indigenous language rather than Koro. The Koro-Aka tribe lives among the Aka (Hruso) tribe. However, the Koro-Aka people speak a very distantly related language from the remaining Aka tribe who speak Hruso-Aka. Researchers hypothesize Koro may have originated from a group of people enslaved and brought to the area.

== Classification ==
Recognition in the academic literature of Koro as a distinct language goes back at least to the 1962 publication of Raghuvir Sinha's book The Akas and lexical data was first published in 1992 by Dalvindar Singh Grewal with his doctoral thesis titled Aka, Miji and their kindred in Arunachal Pradesh : an enquiry into determinants of their identity. The 2009 edition of the Ethnologue (Lewis 2009), which based its findings on a language survey conducted in 2005, is therefore not the earliest recognition of its distinct status, as is commonly assumed. It notes that Koro has only 9 percent lexical similarity with Hruso Aka, and that it is "highly dissimilar to neighboring languages".

In October 2010, the National Geographic Daily News published an article corroborating the findings of the Ethnologue based on research conducted in 2008 by a linguistic team of David Harrison, Gregory Anderson, and Ganesh Murmu while documenting two Hruso languages (Aka and Miji) as part of National Geographic's "Enduring Voices" project. It was reported to them as a dialect of Aka, but turned out to be highly divergent.

Mark Post and Roger Blench (2011) propose that Koro is related to Milang in a branch, or perhaps independent family, they call Siangic.

== Phonology ==
=== Consonants ===
Below are the consonants of Koro.

Consonants of Koro
	Bilabial	Labial-dental	Alveolar	Palato-alveolar	Palatal	Velar	Glottal
Plosive	p b		t d			k g	ʔ
Fricative		f v	s z	ʃ			h hʲ
Affricate				t͡ʃ d͡ʒ			
Nasal	m		n		ɲ	ŋ	
Flapped			ɾ				
Lateral			l				
Approximants	w				j		

Phonemes to the left of a cell are voiceless while phonemes to the right are voiced with the exception of the glottal fricatives which are both voiceless.

In Geissler's work (2013), the articulation of /ʋ/ exists and can sound similar to /v/ or /w/ depending on the speaker. There is a possibility that the articulation of /ʔ/ is not a phoneme in Koro. While a phoneme is the smallest unit of sound that can distinguish one word from another, data suggests that /ʔ/ is instead used for other unidentified roles. For example, it can be used to separate vowels, such as [ma.leʔe.tɨŋ] which means ‘fast boy.’ In other examples, /ʔ/ disappears from phrases. The word ‘that’ in Koro is [baʔ], but strangely, the glottal stop disappears in the word [ba ŋɨn] which means ‘that house’.

In Anderson's work (2010), there exists an aspirated ph or /ɸ/. It is possible that Anderson's data may have been influenced by the differences in speech between natives or the Hindi language used by his informants. In addition, his research does not include words that have no vowels in between consonants, but Blench argues that there are words with no vowels, resulting from the influence of the Hruso language spoken nearby. For example, the word ‘woman’ is msn in Koro.

There is a complementary distribution between the alveolar trill /r/ and the alveolar flap /ɾ/. The trill /r/ is heard in the beginning or end of a word while the flap /ɾ/ is heard in the middle of the word.

=== Vowels ===
Below are the vowels of Koro.

Vowels of Koro
	Front	Central	Back
Close	i		u
Close-Mid	e	ə	
Open-Mid	ɛ		ɔ
Open		a	

Koro has two confirmed types of vowels: oral and nasalized. There are very few diphthongs, such as -aj and -ej. The existence of long vowels is uncertain; while Blench (2018) proposes that long vowels exist, Anderson (2010) argues that only the long vowel a: might exist.

=== Syllables ===
Koro words can have one or multiple syllables in them. The commonly seen syllable is CV, but there are plenty of other syllable structures in Koro such as CVC, CCV, and CCVC.

There are usually three parts to a syllable: the onset, the nucleus, and the coda. The nucleus is usually a vowel, and the onset and the coda are consonants that come before or after the nucleus, respectively. Onsetless syllables, which are syllables that begin with a vowel, exist in Koro, but they do not have a coda. For a coda to exist, the syllable must have an onset. The observed rule is that onsets can have a maximum of two consonants while codas can have only one. In addition, nasal vowels and codas do not occur simultaneously together.

== Morphology ==
=== Nouns ===
Koro nouns can be formed with suffixes. For example, there are many common animal names that have the suffix ‘-le’ in the last syllable of each word.

lele
pig
'pig'

ekile
dog
'dog'

tʃole
chicken
'chicken'

However, this is not always the case because in some words, the suffix ‘-le’ may not be present for an animal name or is present for another name that is not animal related.

gi-bu
snake
‘snake’

ge-le
cloth
‘cloth’

The suffix -me is a plural marker for pronouns and, depending on the Koro speaker, for living things.

nu
you
‘you’

nu-me
you-PL
‘you’

ba
s/he
‘s/he’

ba-me
s/he-PL
'they'

lele-me
pig-PL
‘pigs’

The suffix ‘-gɨ’ is used to show possession, usually around a pronoun. This element may not be Koro's alone but a cognate of other Tibeto-Burman languages as well.

ne-gɨ oɸo
older-my sister
‘my older sister’

nu-gɨ oɸo
older-your sister
‘your older sister’

ne-gɨ ama
older-my brother
‘my older brother’

nu-gɨ ama
older-your brother
‘your older brother’

Pronouns in Koro have three types of persons: first, second, and third. These pronouns can either be singular or plural.

Pronoun Types
Person	Singular	Plural
1st	ne	eme
2nd	nu	nu-me
3rd	ba	ba-me

=== Verbs ===
The suffix -ro is an imperative marker, which conveys a command or request to another person.

ne-me gide-ro
I-OBJ see-IMP
‘look at me!’

The suffix -le is a negative imperative (prohibitive) marker, which conveys a command or request to not do an action to another person.

ne-me gide-le
I-OBJ see-PROH
‘don't look at me!’

The suffix -ŋa is a negative indicative marker, which negates a statement or question.

ne muru-dɨ-m gide-gɨ
I man-DEF-OBJ see-TAM.I
‘I saw the man’

ne muru-dɨ-m gide-ŋa
I man-DEF see-NEG-OBJ
‘I did not see the man’

== Syntax ==
The basic word order of Koro is subject-object-verb.

mɨsɨn kako pɨrɨ-doĩje
woman book read-PROG
‘the woman is reading a book’

The structure of noun phrases usually follows demonstrative-noun-adjective-numerals. Demonstrative elements are determiners used to indicate a person or thing, such as the words: this, that, and those. Numerals do not need a numeral classifiers to help describe the quantity of a noun.

ti lele ma kala
DEM pig black three
DEM N ADJ NUM
‘these three black pigs’

In ditransitive sentences in which there are two objects, the order usually follows subject-object1-object2-verb. Object 1 is the indirect object that is receiving the action while object 2 is the direct object being acted upon.

ne li muru-li-m lele rã-gɨ
I DET man-DEF-OBJ pig give:TAM.I
‘I gave the pig to the man

Question words come after the subject or object.

nu [h]igina gide-nde
you what see-INT
SUBJ Q._{OBJ} VERB
‘what did you see?’

nu-mɨ lele-de asuna rã-de
you-OBJ pig-DEF who give-INT
OBJ_{1} OBJ_{2} Q._{SUBJ} VERB
‘who gave you the pig?’

== See also ==
- Koro word lists (Wiktionary)
