= Siangic languages =

Sino-Tibetan language family of India

Siangic
- Koro-Holon
- Geographic distribution: Arunachal Pradesh
- Linguistic classification: Sino-Tibetan?: Greater Siangic?; Siangic
- Subdivisions: Koro; Milang

Language codes
- Glottolog: koro1317

The Siangic languages (or Koro-Holon languages) are a small family of possibly Sino-Tibetan languages spoken in Arunachal Pradesh, northeast India. The Siangic languages consist of Koro and Milang.

== Classification ==
Milang, which has been extensively influenced by Padam (a Tani language), is alternatively classified as a divergent Tani language (Post & Blench 2011). Koro has undergone influence from Hruso (Post & Blench 2011). However, Milang and Koro do not belong to either the Tani or Hrusish groups of languages.

It is unclear whether the Siangic is a branch of Sino-Tibetan or an independent language family that has undergone extensive Sino-Tibetan influence. Post & Blench (2011) note that Siangic has a substratum of unknown origin, and consider Siangic to be an independent language family. Anderson (2014), who refers to Siangic as Koro-Holon instead, considers Siangic (Koro-Holon) to be a branch of Sino-Tibetan rather than an independent language family.

== Reconstruction ==
=== Post & Blench (2011) ===
The following Proto-Siangic forms reconstructed by Mark Post & Roger Blench (2011:8-9) do not have lexical parallels with Proto-Tani, and are unique to the Siangic branch.

Gloss	Proto-Siangic	Koro	Milang
(negator suffix)	*-ŋa	-ŋa	-ŋə
(desiderative suffix)	*-mi	-mi	-mi
give	*ram	rã	ram
know	*fu	fu	hu
ant	*paŋ	pa-su	paŋ-kər
chicken	*co	co-le	a-cu
stone	*bu	u-bu	da-bu
ear	*raɲ(u?)	rã	ra-ɲu
mouth	*caŋ	sa-pu	caŋ-ci
buttocks	*kɨ-ruŋ	kɨɻ	ki-ruŋ
pus	*a-nɨ	i-ni	a-nɨ
day	*nə	me-ne	a-nə
sun	*mə	me-ne	mə-ruŋ
seven	*roŋ(al)	rõ	raŋal
eight	*ra-ljaŋ	rã-la	rajəŋ
ten	*faŋ	fã-lã	haŋ-tak
axe	*rak-pu	rak-pa	ra-pu
grandfather	*abo- + 'old man'	abo-murzi	a-bə (bu-ku ~ ma-zaŋ)
grandmother	*adze- + 'old woman'	aje-mɨsiŋ	a-dzi (dzi-ku)
sand	*bu-pi	bu-pi	bu-pi
yesterday	*ba-nə	ba-n(e)	ba-nə
have (be there)	*kjo	ko	cu
bamboo	*fu	fu	a-hu
egg	*cu-ci	cu-ci	ci-ci
what	*hVgV-nV	(h)igi-na	ha-ga-nu
cultivated field	*p(j?)u	pu	a-pu
rice paddy	*kɨ	ki-raka	du-kɨ
green	*ja-caŋ	jã-ca	jə-caŋ
small	*u(-ŋa?)	u-ŋa	u-lee
sister, older	*a-Co	o-fo	a-u
root	*raŋ	ne-raŋ	ta-pɨr
ripe	*ŋin	i-ŋi	man
tell	*pu	pu-s(u)	po-lu

=== Modi (2013) ===
Modi (2013) lists the following Proto-Siangic forms, along with forms for Milang, Koro, Idu, Taraon, and Proto-Tani. Additional cognate sets that were not included in Post & Blench (2011) include black, house, salt, fat, and today.

Gloss	Proto-Siangic	Koro	Milang	Taraon	Idu	Proto-Tani
today	*V-ne	se-ne	ɨ-nə	a tia-n̥n	e tia-ɲi	*si-lo
seven	*roŋ(al)	rã	ra-ŋal	weŋ, ɨ-eŋ	i-ɦoŋ	*kV-nV(t), *kV-nɨt
ear	*raɲ(u?)	rã	ra-ɲu	kru-naŋ	akru-na, ako-na	*ɲa(-ruŋ), *ɲo
give	*ram	rã	ram	haŋ	haŋ	*bi
axe	*rak-pu	rak-pa	ra-pu	pa	e-pa	*əgɨŋ
eight	*ra-ljaŋ	rãla	ra-jɛŋ	liɨm	i-lioŋ	*pri-ɲi
salt	*pu	plo	ta-pu	pla	pra	*lo
ant	*paŋ	pa-su	paŋ-kər	paː-chai	pa-si	*ruk
day	*nə	me-ne	a-nə	kɨ-n	i-ni	*lo
house	*Noŋ	ŋɨn	a-ɲuk	aŋ	oŋ	*kum
sun	*mə	me-ne	mə-ruŋ	rɨn	rɨŋ, rɨn	*doŋ-ɲi
black	*ma	ma	je-gjaŋ	ma	ma	
white	*ljo	lap(l)õ	je-cci	lio	lio	*pun, *puŋ
rice	*kje	ki-raka	du-kɨ	kie	ke	*am-bwn
bamboo	*fu	fu	ahu	hui	a bra li	*ɦə(ŋ)
know	*fu	fu	hu	ka-sa	ka-sa	*ken
fat	*fo	fõ, u-fu	a-hu	ta-so	so	*fu
ten	*faŋ	fã-lã	haŋ-tak	xa-lɨŋ	hoŋ-ɦoŋ	*cam, *(r)jiŋ
egg	*cu-ci	cuci	cici	a(ː)-tei	meto cu	*pɨ
fowl/chicken	*co	co-le	a-cu	tiu	me-to	*rok
mouth	*caŋ	sa-pu	caŋ-ci	tʰɨ-rɨm-bram, thɨ-rɨn	tʰɨ-ram-bram, eko-be	*gam (*nap)
sand	*bu-pi	bu-pi	sa-pi	ta-pi	a-pi	sulli (Padam)
yesterday	*ba-nə	ba-ne	ba-nə	bɨ-liɨŋ	bɨ-ɲi	*mə-lo

== See also ==
- Greater Siangic comparative vocabulary list (Wiktionary)

== Bibliography ==
- Post, Mark W. and Roger Blench (2011). "Siangic: A new language phylum in North East India", 6th International Conference of the North East India Linguistics Society, Tezpur University, Assam, India, 31 Jan – 2 Feb.
- Blench, Roger (2014). Fallen leaves blow away: a neo-Hammarstromian approach to Sino-Tibetan classification. Presentation given at the University of New England, Armidale, 6 September 2014.
