= Zakhring language =

Unclassified language spoken in India

Zakhring
- Meyor
- Native to: China, India
- Region: Arunachal, Tibet
- Ethnicity: Zekhring people
- Native speakers: 1000 (2007)
- Language family: Sino-Tibetan? Isolate?: Midzuish?; Zakhring

Language codes
- ISO 639-3: zkr
- Glottolog: zakh1243
- ELP: Zakhring
- Zakhring is classified as Definitely Endangered by the UNESCO Atlas of the World's Languages in Danger.

Zahkring (also Eastern Mishmi or Zaiwa; known as Meyor in India and Zha (Zhahua 扎话) in China) is a language of Arunachal Pradesh and three villages in Tibet.

== Classification ==
Zakhring has been classified as a Midzuish language. Blench and Post (2011) consider Zakhring to be an East Bodish language that has been influenced by Midzu (which they classify as a language isolate) or other divergent languages of the region. In 2015, Blench suggests that Zakhring may be a language isolate. Blench argues that Zakhring had borrowed heavily from Midzu and Tibetic, and then later borrowed from Naga languages and Jingpho as well. Blench (2024) leaves Zakhring unclassified.

Scott DeLancey (2015) considers Meyor to be part of a wider Central Tibeto-Burman group.

== Names ==
Li and Jiang (2001) reports that the Zakhring have no actual autonym, but are referred to by the neighboring Taraon, Kaman language, Idu, and Tibetan peoples by various names.

- tɕa31 kʰreŋ55 (Taraon exonym)
- tɕa31 kʰɹɯn55 (Kaman exonym)
- tsa35 tɕoŋ55 (Tibetan exonym)
- mi31 si55 pu53 (Idu exonym; the Idu are located in Upper Zayü Township, 上察隅乡)

According to Li and Jiang (2001), the Kaman exonym for the Tibetan people of Bomê County (波密县) is si31 dut55 pu55. The Taraon refer to the Tibetans as la31 ma35, while the Kaman refer to the Tibetans as de31 loŋ55.

== Distribution ==
In China, Zakhring is spoken in Songgu (松古村), Lading (拉丁村), and Tama (塔玛村) villages in Lower Zayü Township (下察隅乡), Zayü County (察隅县), Tibet.

In India, Meyor communities are found in the following 15 villages of Kibthoo Circle and Walong Circle of Anjaw District, Arunachal Pradesh. The total population of the villages numbered 376 as of May 2001.

- Kibthoo Circle
  - Kahao
  - Mosai
  - Danbari
  - Kundan
  - Khroti
  - Yaikung
  - Bara Kundan
  - Kunjuk
- Walong Circle
  - Walong
  - Tinai
  - Dong
  - Tilam
  - Sapkung
  - Pangung

== See also ==
- Zakhring word list (Wiktionary)
