= Siang =

Siang may refer to:

- Siang language, an Austronesian language of Indonesia
- Xiang River, a tributary of the Yangtze
- Brahmaputra River, known as Siang in Arunachal Pradesh, India; it gives its name to the following districts:
  - East Siang district
  - Siang district
  - West Siang district
  - Upper Siang district
- Siangic languages, Sino-Tibetan language family of India
- Greater Siangic languages, Sino-Tibetan language grouping

== See also ==
- Ann Siang Hill in Singapore
