= Ruso (disambiguation) =

Ruso may refer to:

- Ruso, North Dakota, city in McLean County, North Dakota, United States
- Aaron ruso or Aaron Russo (1943–2007), American entertainment businessman, film producer and director, and political activist
- Darko Ruso (born 1962), Serbian professional basketball coach
- Ruso Flores or Andrés Flores (born 1990), Salvadoran footballer
- Pamphila ruso, a butterfly in the family Hesperiidae

== See also ==
- Hruso (disambiguation)
- Russo
