= Digaro languages =

Language family of Tibet and northeast India

Digarish
- Northern Mishmic
- Geographic distribution: Arunachal Pradesh
- Linguistic classification: possibly Sino-Tibetan or an independent family: Greater Siangic ?; Digarish
- Subdivisions: Idu Mishmi; Taraon

Language codes
- Glottolog: mish1241

The Digaro (Digarish), Northern Mishmi (Mishmic), or Kera'a–Tawrã languages are a possible small family of possibly Sino-Tibetan languages spoken by the Mishmi people of southeastern Tibet and Arunachal Pradesh.

The languages are Idu and Taraon (Digaro, Darang). Lexical similarities are restricted to certain semantic fields, so a relationship between them is doubtful.

== External relationships ==
They are not related to the Southern Mishmi Miju languages, apart from possibly being Sino-Tibetan. However, Blench and Post (2011) suggests that they may not even be Sino-Tibetan, but rather an independent language family of their own.

Blench (2014) classifies the Digaro languages as part of the Greater Siangic group of languages.

== Names ==
Autonyms and exonyms for Digaro-speaking peoples, as well as Miju (Kaman), are given below (Jiang, et al. 2013:2-3).

Names of Mishmi peoples
	Taraon name	Kaman name	Idu name	Assamese name
Taraon people	da31 raŋ53	tɕi31 moŋ35	tɑ31 rɑŋ35	Digaru; Digaru Mishmi
Kaman people	tɕɑu53	kɯ31 mɑn35	mi31 tɕu55	Midzu
Idu people	dju55; dju55 ta31 rɑŋ53; dɑi53	min31 dɑu55; hu53	i53 du55	Chulikata Mishmi
Zha people 扎人	tɕɑ31 kʰen55	tɕɑ31 kreŋ35	—	—
Tibetan people	lɑ31 mɑ55; mei53 bom55	dɯ31 luŋ35; hɑi35 hɯl55	ɑ31 mi53; pu53; mi31 si55 pu53	—

== Registers ==
Idu, Tawra, Kman, and Meyor all share a system of multiple language registers, which are (Blench 2016):

1. ordinary speech
2. speech of hunters: lexical substitution, the replacement of animal names and others by special lexical forms, and sometimes short poems
3. speech of priests/shamans: more complex, involving much language which is difficult to understand, and also lengthy descriptions of sacrificial animals
4. poetic/lyrical register (not in Idu, but appears in Kman)
5. mediation register (only in Idu?)
6. babytalk register
