= Zekhring people =

Regions with significant populations
- India (Arunachal Pradesh)

Languages
- Zakhring

Religion
- Animism, Hinduism, Christianity

The Zekhring are from the Anjaw District (formerly part of Lohit district) of Arunachal Pradesh. They live in the hilly terrain and banks of the Lohit River in the Walong and Kibithoo area.

They are Animists, although they have recently co-adopted Tibetan Buddhism. The Zekhring sustain their livelihoods through agriculture. They are culturally more akin to the Miju Mishmi than to the Tibetans in the north. Sungkhu, Tsotangpho Wangley, Tso Tangpo and Losar are their major festivals.

== Population ==
As of 2002, their tribal population stood at 300, and their population included members of an ethnically akin tribe, the Meyor.
