= Mishmi people =

Ethnic group of Tibet and Northeast India

Mishmi
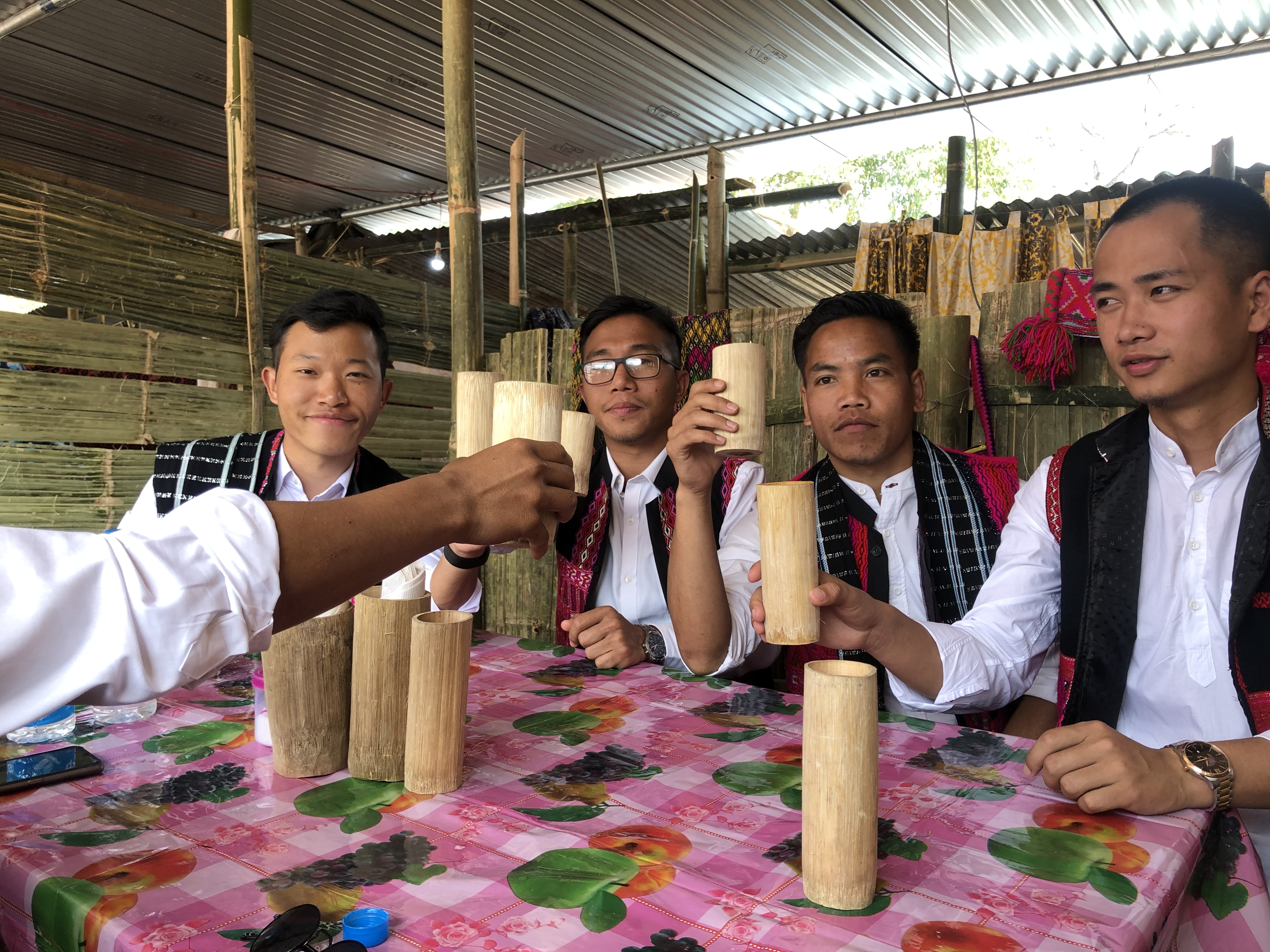
- Mishmi celebrating a festival

Total population
- 35,000 approx

Regions with significant populations
- India: N/A
- Arunachal Pradesh: N/A
- China: N/A
- Tibet Autonomous Region: N/A

Languages
- Northern Mishmi languages, Southern Mishmi languages, Mandarin

Religion
- Animism

Related ethnic groups
- Tibetans, Lhobas, Other Sino-Tibetan people

Mishmi people
- Chinese: 代巴玫
Transcriptions
Standard Mandarin
- Hanyu Pinyin: Deng

Deng Ren
- Traditional Chinese: 僜人
Transcriptions

The Mishmi people are an ethnic group of Tibet and Arunachal Pradesh, India. The area is known as the Mishmi Hills. Only one group, called the Deng, occupy Zayu County in southern Tibet.

== Clans ==
The Mishmi consist of four tribes: Idu Mishmi (Idu Lhoba); Digaro tribe (Taraon, Darang Deng), Miju Mishmi (Kaman Deng), and the Deng Mishmi. The four sub-divisions of the tribe emerged due to the geographical distribution, but racially all the four groups are of the same stock.

The Idu are also known as Yidu Lhoba in Tibet and often referred as Chulikatas in Assam. The Idus are primarily concentrated in the Upper Dibang Valley and Lower Dibang Valley district and some of the northern parts of Lohit district of Arunachal Pradesh in India. Taraon, also called Digaru Mishmis, are distributed in the hill and the foothills between the Dibang, Digaru and the Lohit rivers. Kamans are also known as the Miju Mishmis; they live between the Lohit and the Kambang rivers in the foothills and in the Mishmi Hills on both sides of the Lohit river right up to the frontiers to Rima river. There are around 30,000 of them in Arunachal Pradesh.

== Distribution ==
Mishmi man with traditional crossbow.

=== India ===
They are located in the northeastern tip of the central Arunachal Pradesh in Upper and Lower Dibang Valley, Lohit and Anjaw Districts, all bordering southern Tibet in northeast India.

=== China ===
In China, the Mishmi-Idu are classified as Lhoba people.

The Deng people (or Dengba, Chinese transcription of Taraon-Kaman languages: 代巴玫; Chinese: 僜人; Hanyu pinyin: Dèng Rén) live in nine villages in Tibet's Zayu County and virgin forest areas between the Himalayas and the Hengduan Mountains at an elevation of 1,000 metres. Bradley (2007) reports 800 ta˧˩ ʒuaŋ˥ (Chinese: Darang Deng) and 200 kɯ˧˩ mɑn˧˥ (Chinese: Geman Deng; known as the Kaman or Miju Mishmi in India) in China, one village in Burma where they are known as Taraung, and the Taraon, Tayin, or Tain (formerly Digaru Mishmi) in northeastern India.

There is little information on this group due to the sensitivity of the region. The last coordinated effort to understand the Mishmi occurred in the year 1985, after the Chinese academy of social sciences dispatched a total of four anthropologists hailing from the institute of Ethnology and Anthropology.

The Deng Mishmi are not officially recognised by the government of People's Republic of China. (Aiyadurai & Lee, 2018) note that instead, "...they are classified as an 'unidentified ethnicity' or 'others', largely due to the nature of a category for characterizing only a handful of people in contemporary China." Many of them have migrated from China to India.

== History ==
=== Under British rule ===
British era photo of a mishmi man and woman in their traditional attire.

The beginning of British rule in India with regards to the hill people was generally one of non-interference due to a fear of rebellion from these groups.

However, this policy changed when the British began to realize how important the frontier region of Assam and the adjoining hills (including the Mishmi Hills) were for trade.

According to (Aiyadurai & Lee, 2018), "Another strategic reason to manage such an area was that the British were concerned that if they did not take interest in this region, the Mishmi people would end up becoming 'Chinese' subjects. To win over the local native people, governmental representatives carried with them tea and cigarettes as 'political presents'". Officially, it was not until the murder of Noel Williamson (a political officer) and Dr Gregorson (a tea planter and doctor) that the British began to clamp down on the Mishmi in a show of force and dominance.

Mishmi people in traditional attire.

The British perceived the Mishmi as something to be contained, and not understood. The Mishmi, in 1882, were labelled as “untouched by any civilizing influences”. The natives in general were typically viewed “as less than human and abominable”.

== Notable people ==
- Mukut Mithi, former Chief Minister of Arunachal Pradesh
- Kalikho Pul, former Chief Minister of Arunachal Pradesh
