= Hruso =

Hruso may refer to:

- Hruso people, of Arunachal Pradesh, India
- Hruso language, their Sino-Tibetan language

== See also ==
- Hrusish languages, the family to which Hruso belongs
