= Bangru =

Bangru may refer to:

- Bangru language (Haryana), or Haryanvi, an Indo-Aryan language of north-central India
- Bangru language (Arunachal Pradesh), a possibly Sino-Tibetan language of northeastern India
- Bangru, Tibet, a village in the Tibetan Autonomous Region, China
