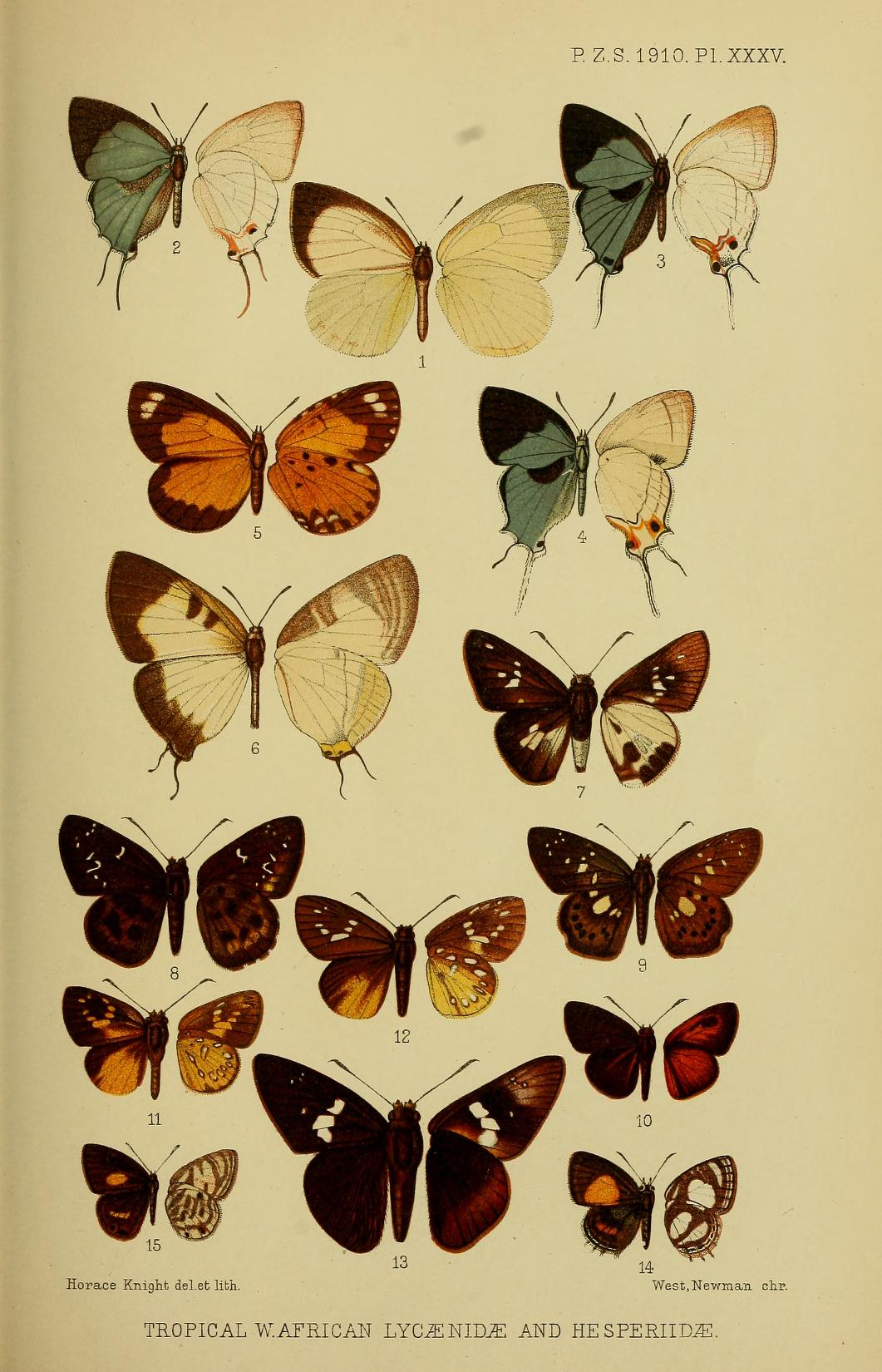
- Teniorhinus figure 10

Scientific classification
- Kingdom: Animalia
- Phylum: Arthropoda
- Class: Insecta
- Order: Lepidoptera
- Family: Hesperiidae
- Tribe: Erionotini
- Genus: Teniorhinus; Holland, 1892

Synonyms
- Oxypalpus Holland, 1892; Teinorhinus Watson, 1893

= Teniorhinus =

Genus of butterflies

Teniorhinus is a genus of skippers in the family Hesperiidae.

== Species ==
- Teniorhinus harona (Westwood, 1881)
- Teniorhinus herilus (Hopffer, 1855)
- Teniorhinus ignita (Mabille, 1877)
- Teniorhinus niger (Druce, 1910)
- Teniorhinus watsoni Holland, 1892
