= Milang language =

Indian language

Milang
- Holon, Dalbo
- Native to: India
- Region: Arunachal Pradesh
- Ethnicity: 4,000
- Native speakers: 2,150 (2011)
- Language family: Possibly Sino-Tibetan: Greater Siangic?; Siangic; Milang

Language codes
- ISO 639-3: None (mis)
- Glottolog: mila1245
- ELP: Milang
- Milang is classified as Definitely Endangered by the UNESCO Atlas of the World's Languages in Danger.

Milang is a Siangic or Tani language of Upper Siang district, Arunachal Pradesh, India. It is spoken in the three villages of Milang (Milang: Holon), Dalbing, and Pekimodi (Milang: Moobuk Ade), located in Mariyang Subdivision, Upper Siang District, Arunachal Pradesh (Tayeng 1976).

== Classification ==
Milang has traditionally been classified as the most divergent of the Tani languages, hence ultimately Sino-Tibetan. Post & Blench (2011) reclassified it as Siangic, on the basis of clear correspondences with the Koro language in vocabulary that may not ultimately be of Sino-Tibetan origin. The implication is that Milang may, like other Siangic languages, harbour a non-Sino-Tibetan substrate, or may be a non-Sino-Tibetan language with Sino-Tibetan features acquired through prolonged contact, perhaps with the neighbouring and much larger Padam tribe, who speak an Eastern Tani language.
