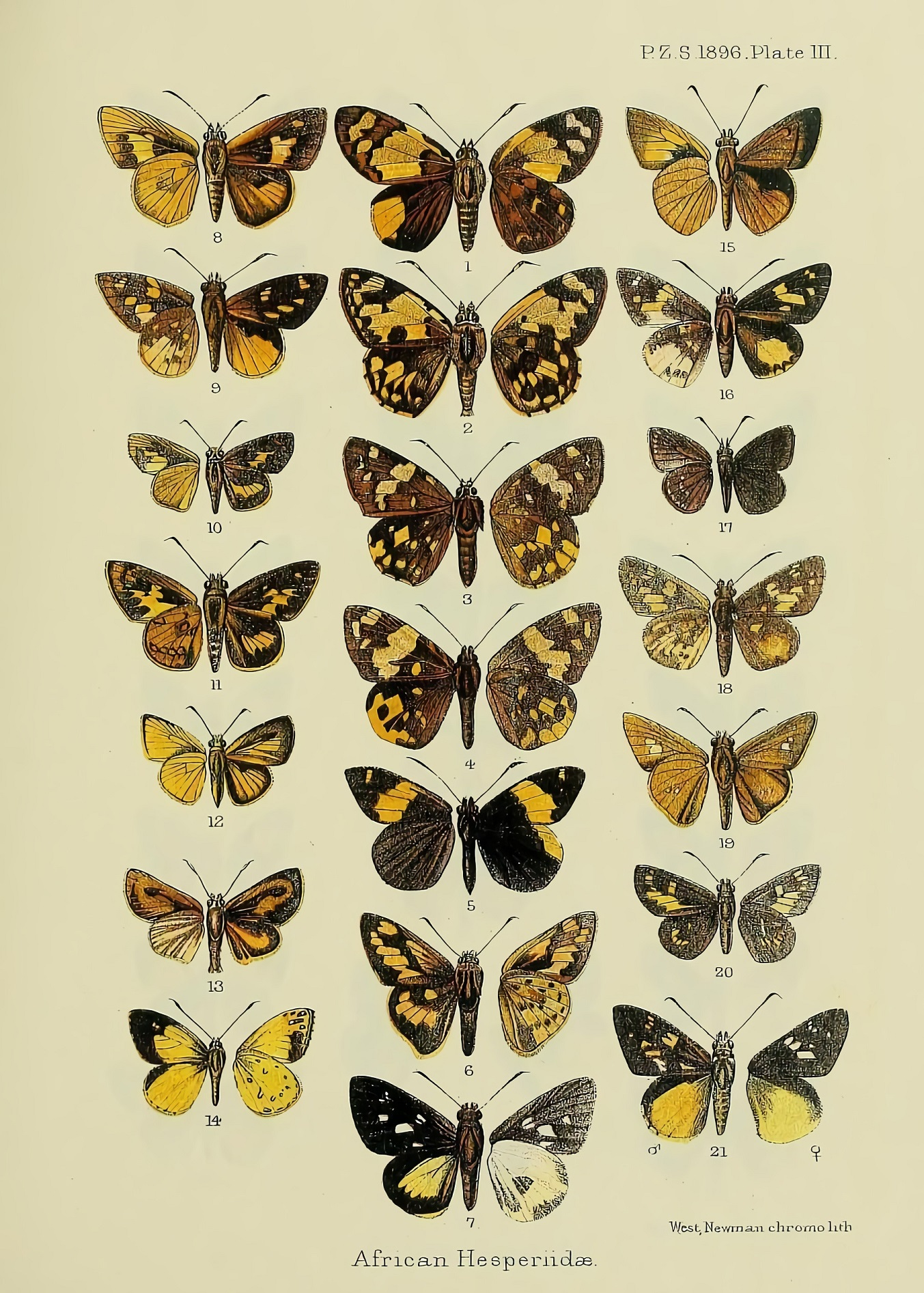
- Teniorhinus watsoni figure 10

Scientific classification
- Domain: Eukaryota
- Kingdom: Animalia
- Phylum: Arthropoda
- Class: Insecta
- Order: Lepidoptera
- Family: Hesperiidae
- Genus: Teniorhinus
- Species: T. watsoni

Binomial name
- Teniorhinus watsoni Holland, 1892

= Teniorhinus watsoni =

Species of butterfly

Teniorhinus watsoni, Watson's small fox, is a butterfly in the family Hesperiidae. It is found in Guinea, Sierra Leone, Liberia, Ivory Coast, Ghana, Nigeria, Cameroon, Gabon and the Republic of the Congo. The habitat consists of forests. The species is associated with rivers and swamps.

The larvae feed on Cynometra megalophylla.
