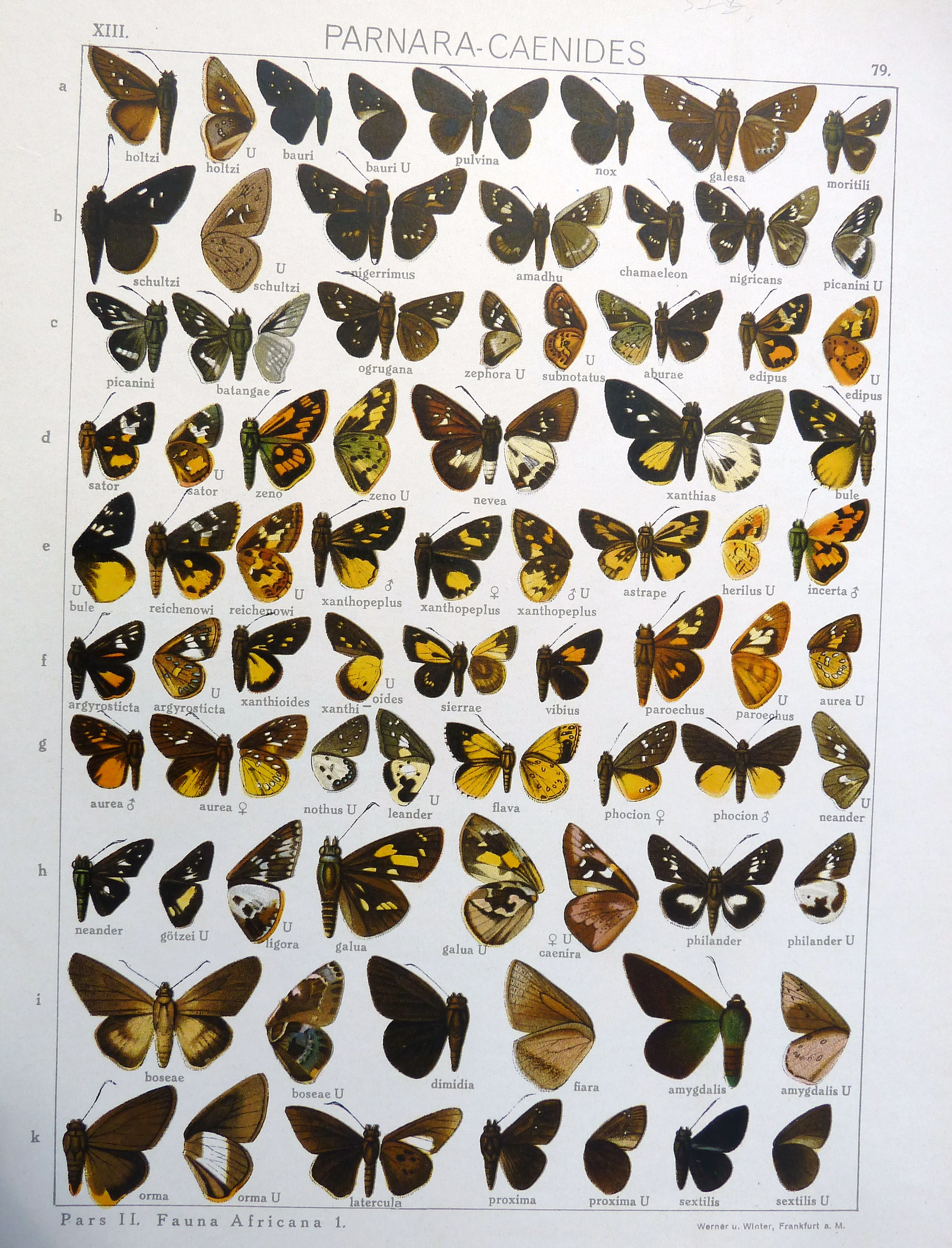

Scientific classification
- Domain: Eukaryota
- Kingdom: Animalia
- Phylum: Arthropoda
- Class: Insecta
- Order: Lepidoptera
- Family: Hesperiidae
- Genus: Teniorhinus
- Species: T. herilus

Binomial name
- Teniorhinus herilus (Hopffer, 1855)

Synonyms
- Pamphila herilus Hopffer, 1855; Parosmodes numa Druce, 1901

= Teniorhinus herilus =

Species of butterfly

Teniorhinus herilus, the Herilus orange or Herilus skipper, is a butterfly in the family Hesperiidae. It is found along the coast of Kenya and in southern and eastern Tanzania, Malawi, Zambia, Mozambique and Zimbabwe. The habitat consists of lowland forests and heavy woodland.

Adults are attracted to flowers. They are on wing in March and April.
