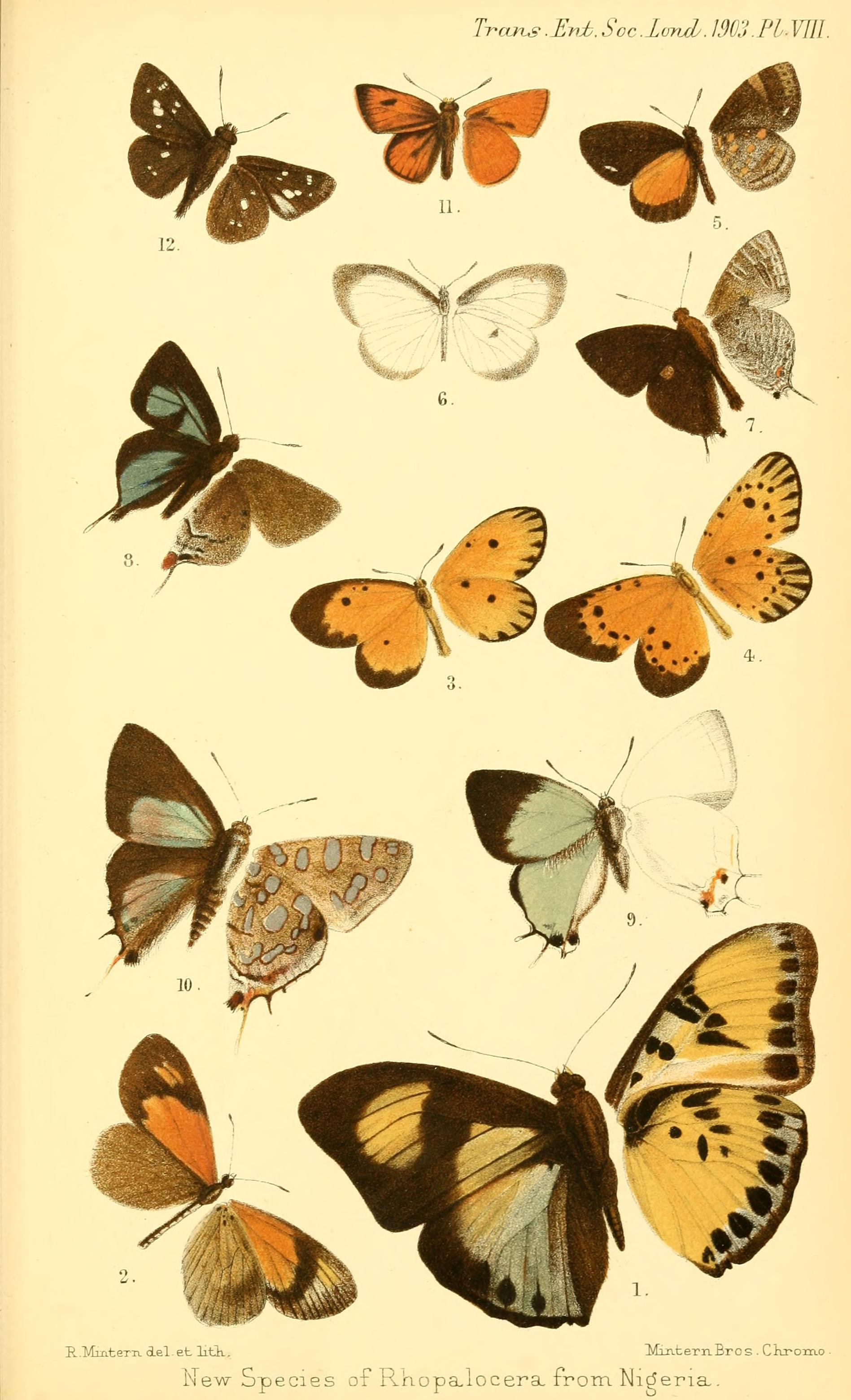
- Teniorhinus ignita figure 11

Scientific classification
- Domain: Eukaryota
- Kingdom: Animalia
- Phylum: Arthropoda
- Class: Insecta
- Order: Lepidoptera
- Family: Hesperiidae
- Genus: Teniorhinus
- Species: T. ignita

Binomial name
- Teniorhinus ignita (Mabille, 1877)

Synonyms
- Pamphila ignita Mabille, 1877; Hesperia pyrosa Plötz, 1879; Pamphila gisgon Mabille, 1891; Oxypalpus fulvus Lathy, 1903; Oxypalpus wollastoni Heron, 1909; Pardaleodes alenica Strand, 1912

= Teniorhinus ignita =

Species of butterfly

Teniorhinus ignita, the fiery small fox , is a butterfly in the family Hesperiidae. It is found in Sierra Leone, Liberia, Ivory Coast, Ghana, Nigeria, Cameroon, Gabon, the Republic of the Congo, the Central African Republic, the Democratic Republic of the Congo, western Uganda, western Tanzania and northern Zambia. The habitat consists of forests and woodland.
