= Mijiic languages =

Mijiic
- Geographic distribution: Arunachal Pradesh, India and Shannan Prefecture, China
- Ethnicity: Miji people
- Linguistic classification: Sino-Tibetan?: Hrusish?; Mijiic
- Subdivisions: Miji (Sajolang); Bangru

Language codes
- Glottolog: miji1239

Mijiic is a small language family of Arunachal Pradesh in northeastern India, consisting of the erstwhile possible language isolate (dialect cluster) Miji and the recently discovered Bangru language. The two languages are clearly related, though "the very different consonant inventories makes seeking regular correspondences difficult." The Bangru and Miji are geographically separated and are not clearly aware of their linguistic relationship, though there is some evidence for contact between East Miji and Bangru in the past. They are commonly included in the Sino-Tibetan language family, but the evidence is weak.

== Numerals ==
The basic numerals correspond.

Numeral	West Miji (Sajolang)	East Miji (Namrai)	Bangru
one	ùŋ	uŋ	akə
two	ɡnì	krn	kəraj
three	ɡə̀tʰə́n	ktʰm	kətajŋ
four	bə̀lí	plaj	purwaj
five	buŋə	pŋu	puŋu
six	rɛ́ʔ	raʔm	rɛʔ
seven	miaʔ	miaʔ	moj
eight	sɨɡeʔ	ʃəɡəʔ	səɡaj
nine	stʰə̌ŋ	ʃətʰən	sətəŋ
ten	lɨ̀n	lɨn	rəŋ
