= Greater Siangic languages =

Language grouping

Greater Siangic
- (proposed)
- Geographic distribution: Arunachal Pradesh
- Linguistic classification: Sino-Tibetan?: Greater Siangic
- Subdivisions: Siangic; Digaro; Pre-Tani

Language codes
- Glottolog: macr1268 (Macro-Tani) mish1241 (Digarish)

Greater Siangic is a language grouping that includes the Siangic languages, Digaro languages (Idu Mishmi and Taraon) and Pre-Tani, the hypothetical substrate language branch of Tani before it became relexified by Sino-Tibetan. The Greater Siangic grouping was proposed by Roger Blench (2014), based on exclusively shared lexical items that had been noted by Modi (2013). Blench (2014) argues that Greater Siangic is an independent language family that has undergone areal influences from Sino-Tibetan languages, and is not a branch of the Sino-Tibetan language family itself.

Various lexical items exclusively shared by Milang, Koro, Taraon, and Idu have also been noted by Modi (2013). Modi (2013) suggests that Taraon could be closer to Milang than Idu is.

== Languages ==
Blench (2014) lists the following languages in Greater Siangic.

- Greater Siangic
  - Pre-Tani
  - Idu-Taraon
  - Siangic
    - Koro
    - Milang

== Sound correspondences ==
Modi (2013: 20–22) notes the following sound correspondences among Milang, Taraon, Idu, and Proto-Tani.

Milang	Taraon	Idu	Proto-Tani
-u	-a	-a	*-o
h-	s-		
C-	Cl-	Cr-	
c-	t-	t-	

== See also ==
- Greater Siangic comparative vocabulary list (Wiktionary)
