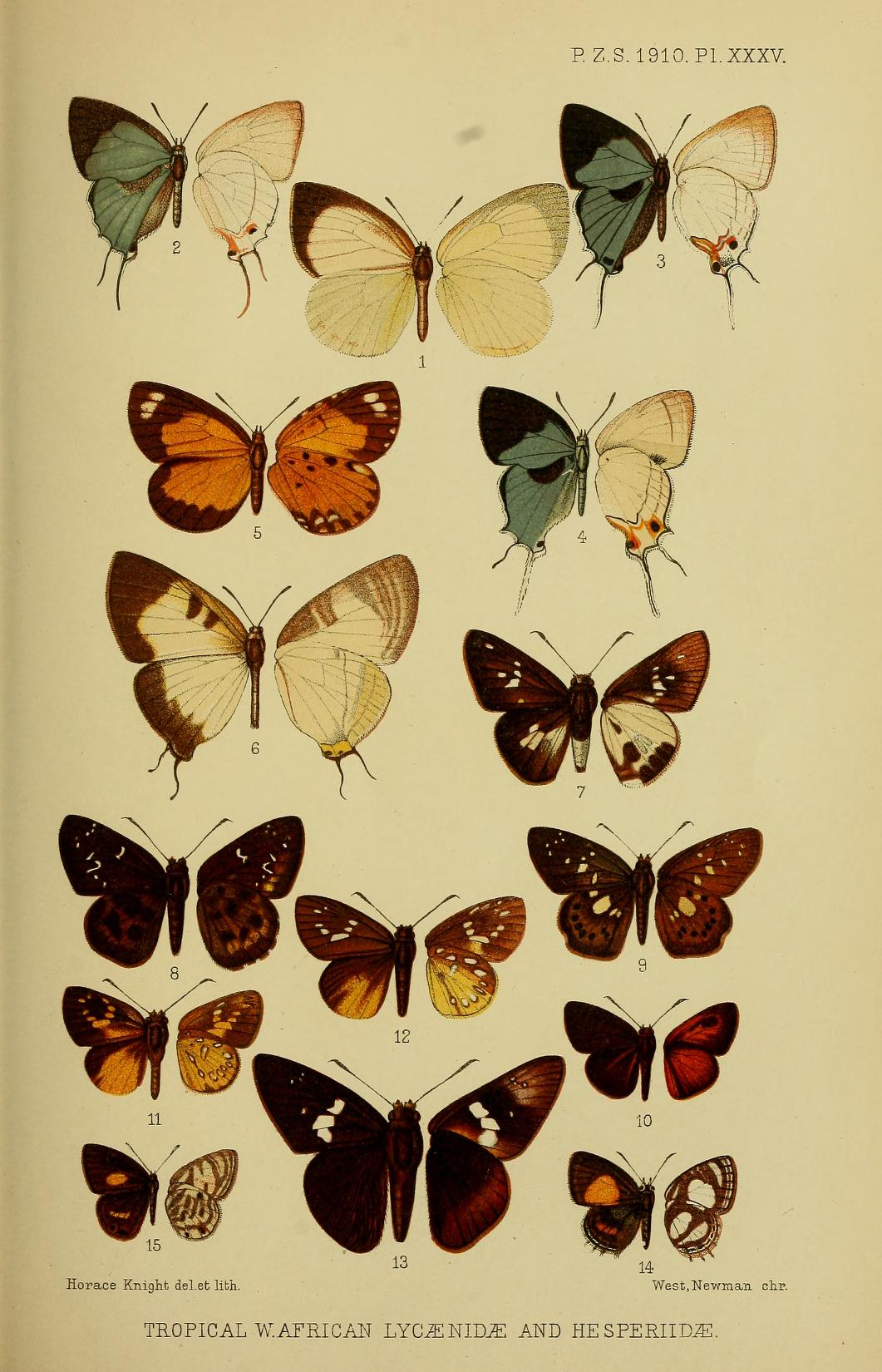
- Figure 10

Scientific classification
- Domain: Eukaryota
- Kingdom: Animalia
- Phylum: Arthropoda
- Class: Insecta
- Order: Lepidoptera
- Family: Hesperiidae
- Genus: Teniorhinus
- Species: T. niger

Binomial name
- Teniorhinus niger (H. H. Druce, 1910)

Synonyms
- Oxypalpus niger H. H. Druce, 1910; Teniorhinus watsoni niger

= Teniorhinus niger =

Species of butterfly

Teniorhinus niger is a butterfly in the family Hesperiidae first described by Hamilton Herbert Druce in 1910. It is found in Cameroon, Gabon, the Democratic Republic of the Congo and western Uganda.
