= Miju Mishmi tribe =

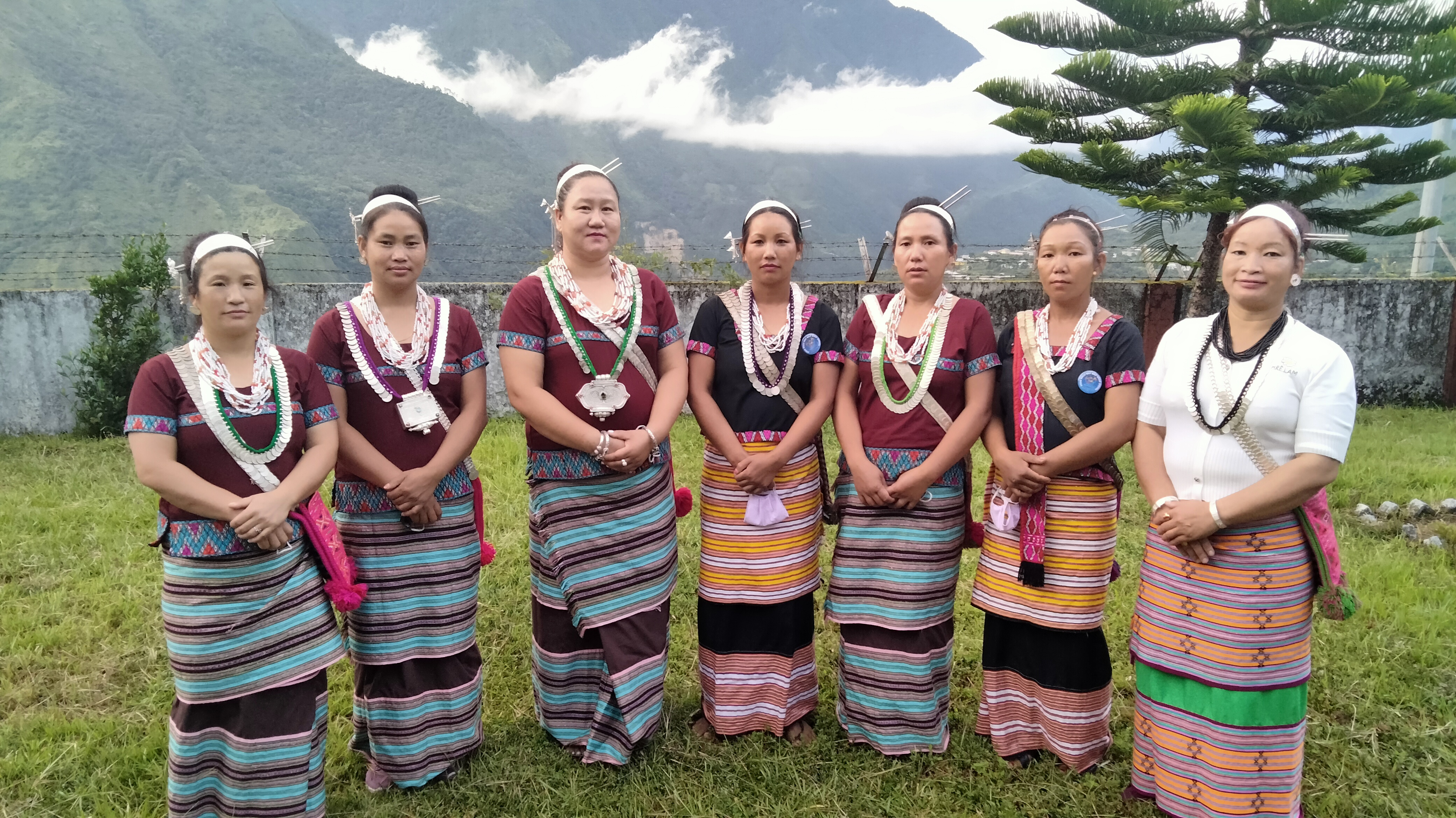
- Miju Mishmi women from Anjaw district in their traditional attire

Total population
- 49,000 (est.)

Languages
- Midzu language

Religion
- Animism

Related ethnic groups
- Idu Mishmi, Den Mishmi, Digaru Mishmi

In Northeastern India, the Miju Mishmi, also known as Kaman or Kammaan, are one of the three tribes of the Mishmi people of Tibet and Arunachal Pradesh. Members of this tribe are located in Anjaw and Lohit district. They live between the Lohit and the Kambang rivers in the foothills and in the Mishmi Hills on both sides of the Lohit River right up to the frontiers to Rima river. There are around 49,000 Mishmis in Arunachal Pradesh. The Miju clan claims to have come from the Kachin country of Myanmar. They speak languages of the Midzu branch of Tibeto-Burman.

== Origin ==
The precise origin of the tribe is unknown, since the tribe does not have written records and relies on stories handed over by the older generations. According to their oral histories, they originated in modern-day Myanmar and migrated along the Lohit River. Other sources claim they originated in Tibet.

== Culture ==
=== Homes ===
Miju Mishmi homes are typically made from bamboo, wood, cane, leaves, and straw. The homes are raised above ground on stilts. For decoration, bones of hunted animals can be used, as well as hunting weapons.

One Miju Mishmi house can contain large extended families, with each nuclear family having their own hearth. Homes typically have at least two hearths; one for cooking and socialization, and another for rituals near the front of the home.

=== Textiles ===
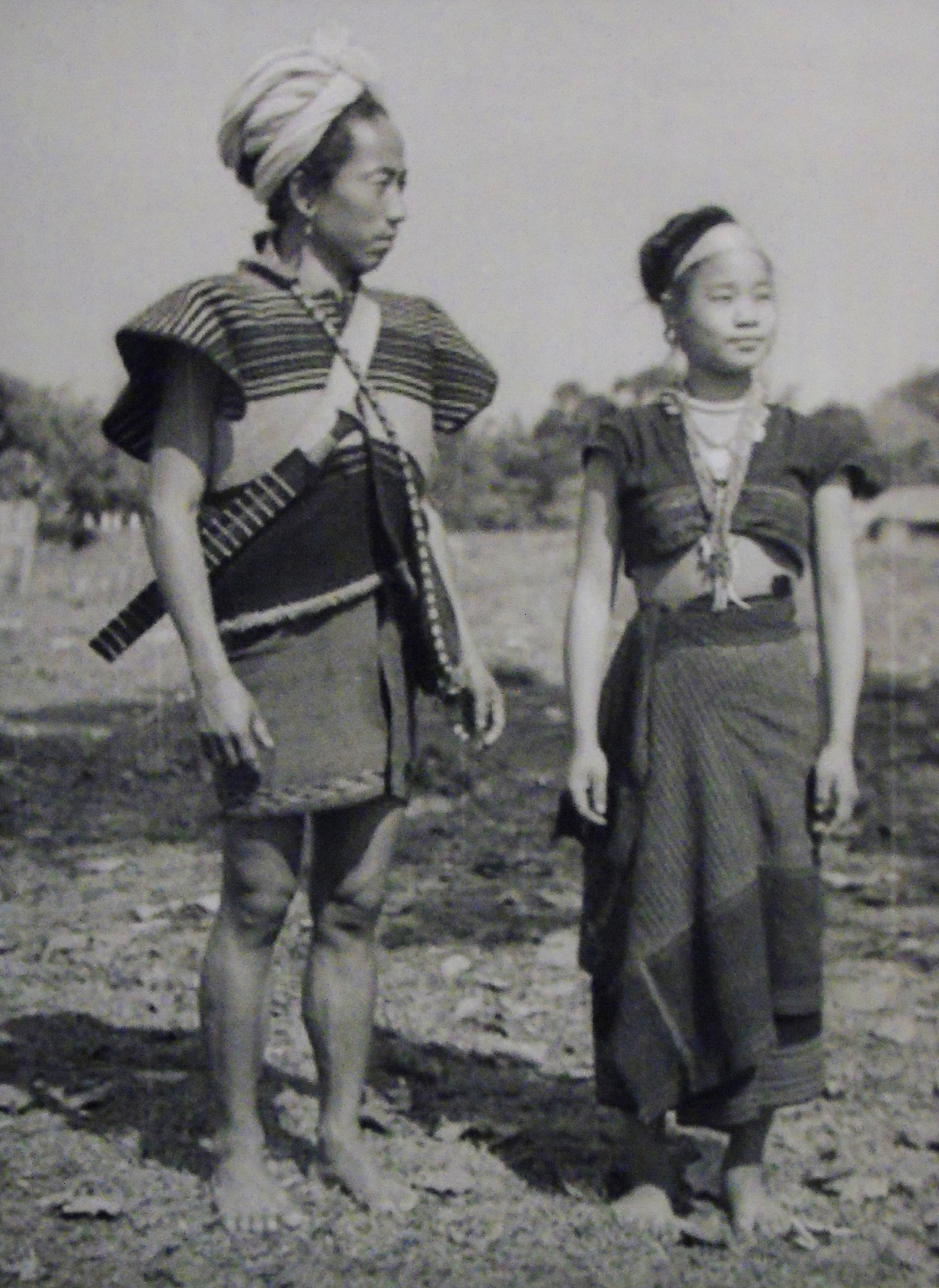
Miju Mishmi couple in traditional attire, Sadiya, 1937

The men wear a narrow waist cloth which is brought up between the legs and hangs down in an embroidered flap in front. Over this is worn a half-sleeved, colorful coat that reaches halfway down the thighs, the lower half of which is embroidered. These coats are called "Mishmi coats". The coats and the waist cloth are both woven on an ordinary Indonesian tension loom.

The typical colors for women's clothing are pink, white, and black. Women wear long black skirts reaching the ankle, with a red embroidery around the edges. The waist may be left bare and a dark shawl is usually thrown over the shoulders. The adornment and patterns on the skirt and shawl have gotten much more intricate and complicated over the time.

Mishmi women are particularly known for intricate designs in their woven cloth. As weavers, Miju Mishmi women use backstrap looms to make a variety of textiles, including the Mishmi coats, worn typically by men.

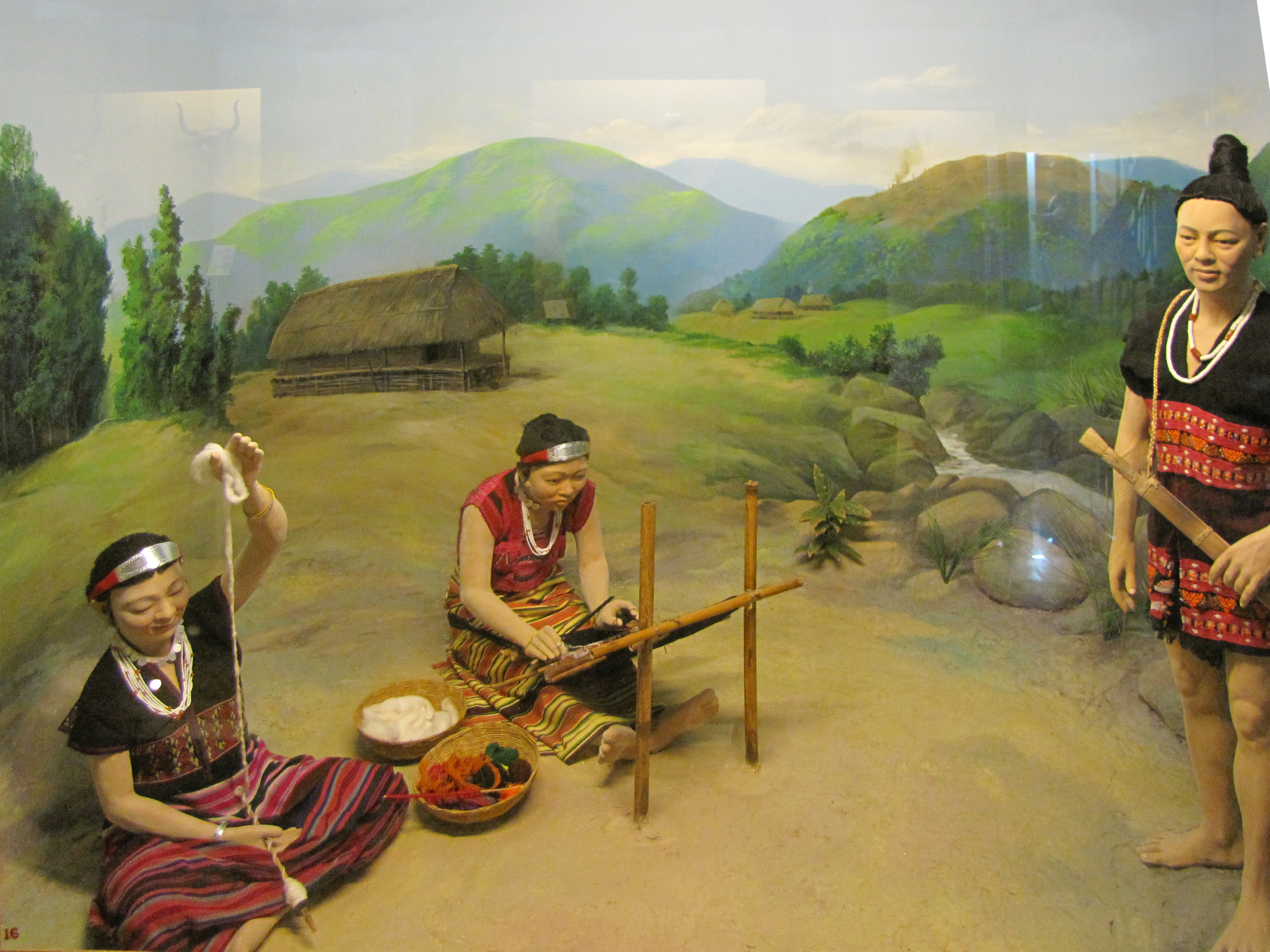
Diorama and wax figures of Kaman people weaving in Jawaharlal Nehru Museum, Itanagar.

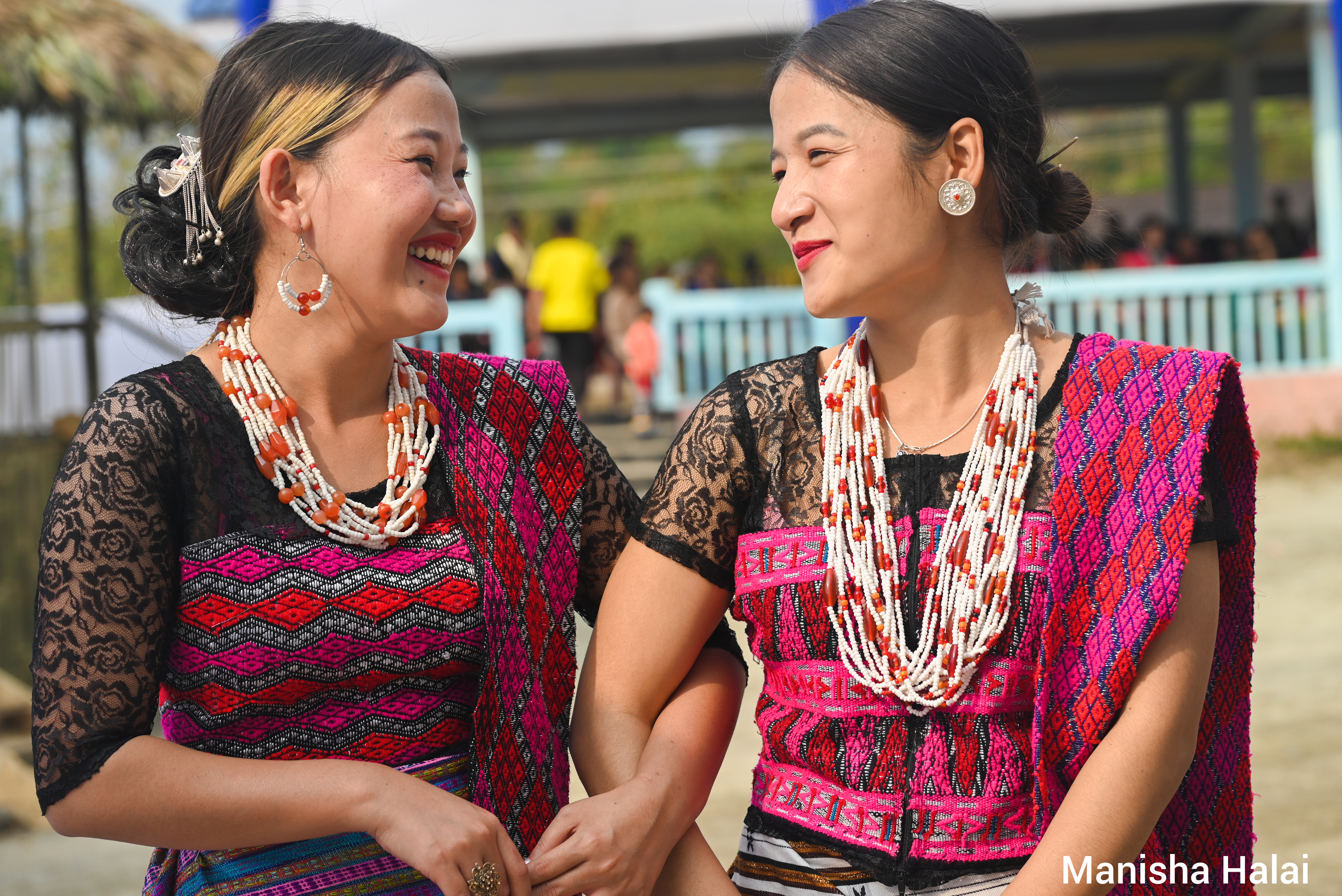
Young Miju Mishmi girls wear their Miju Mishmi traditional attire and ornaments to participate in the Tamla Du Festival.

=== Jewelry ===
Thin silver forehead plates called lenchi and large ear plugs in the shape of trumpets are characteristic, and rich girls often wear numerous silver hoops round the neck. British India silver coins and Yunnan silver coins are used for necklaces by the Miju women. and cane rings are sometimes worn below the knee. The hair is worn long and often tied up in a small puggaree.

== Religion ==
Miju Mishmi people practice animism. Almost every body of nature like the sun, moon, mountains, and rivers are revered as gods. The deities worshipped are Amik Matai (Sun), Matai/Jawmalu (Creator), Buroo (River God), Shyuto (Mountain God ), Teemik (God of water springs), and Kangam. The Miju Mishmi claim to be descendants from Amik Matai, the Sun god.

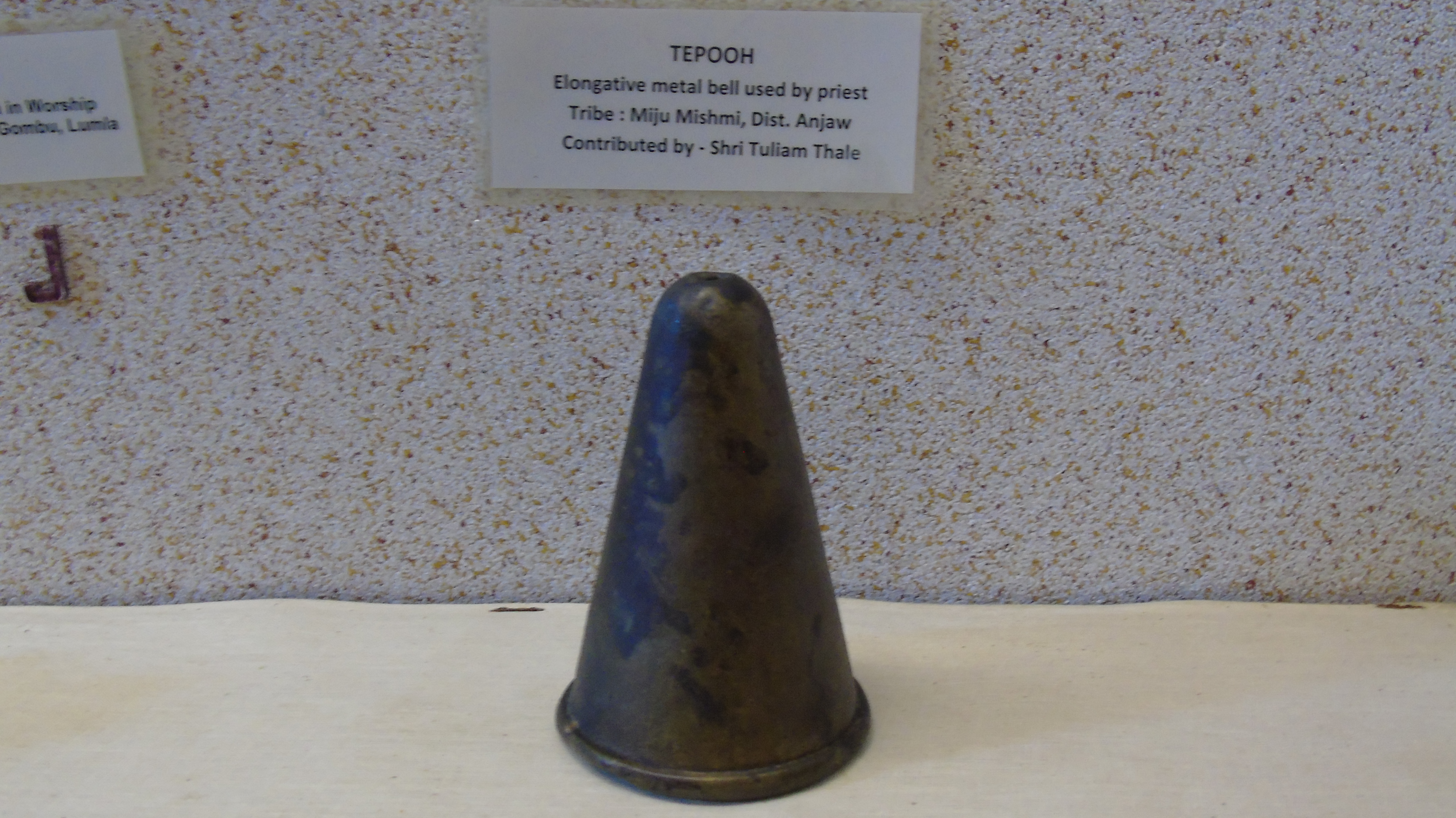
The tepooh (pictured) is a elongative metal bell used by priest of Miju Mishmi tribe, Anjaw district.

The highest-ranking priest is called kahmbrihng.

There are many other malevolent and benevolent deities apart from these who are believed to be protectors or causes of various ailments and problems. All these deities are propitiated from time to time to keep the family and community safe from problems. There are many other religious ceremonies associated with the deities. There is "Tulu" for sending the dead spirit to "Kamoulaam" or the domain of the dead, then there is "Apoung" which is conducted to propitiate the host of deities and the dead spirits of the family as well. "Tanoh, Thung and Changrang" are conducted for the welfare of the family society or whatever the chief priest (Kambring) prescribes.

A prayer song of the Miju Mishmi people, praying to the Sun god Amik Matai.

The Mishmi religion shows some Tibetan influence, but it is not similar to Buddhism or Hinduism. The tribe has considerable number of named gods, which are rare in most of the tribes of the state. Some Gods are general with many pertaining especially to men and to women, respectively. The religious rituals are carried out by priests, and Mishmis spend much time and substance offering sacrifices of appeasement on their instructions. In fact, almost all livestock is used only for sacrifice.

== Festivals ==
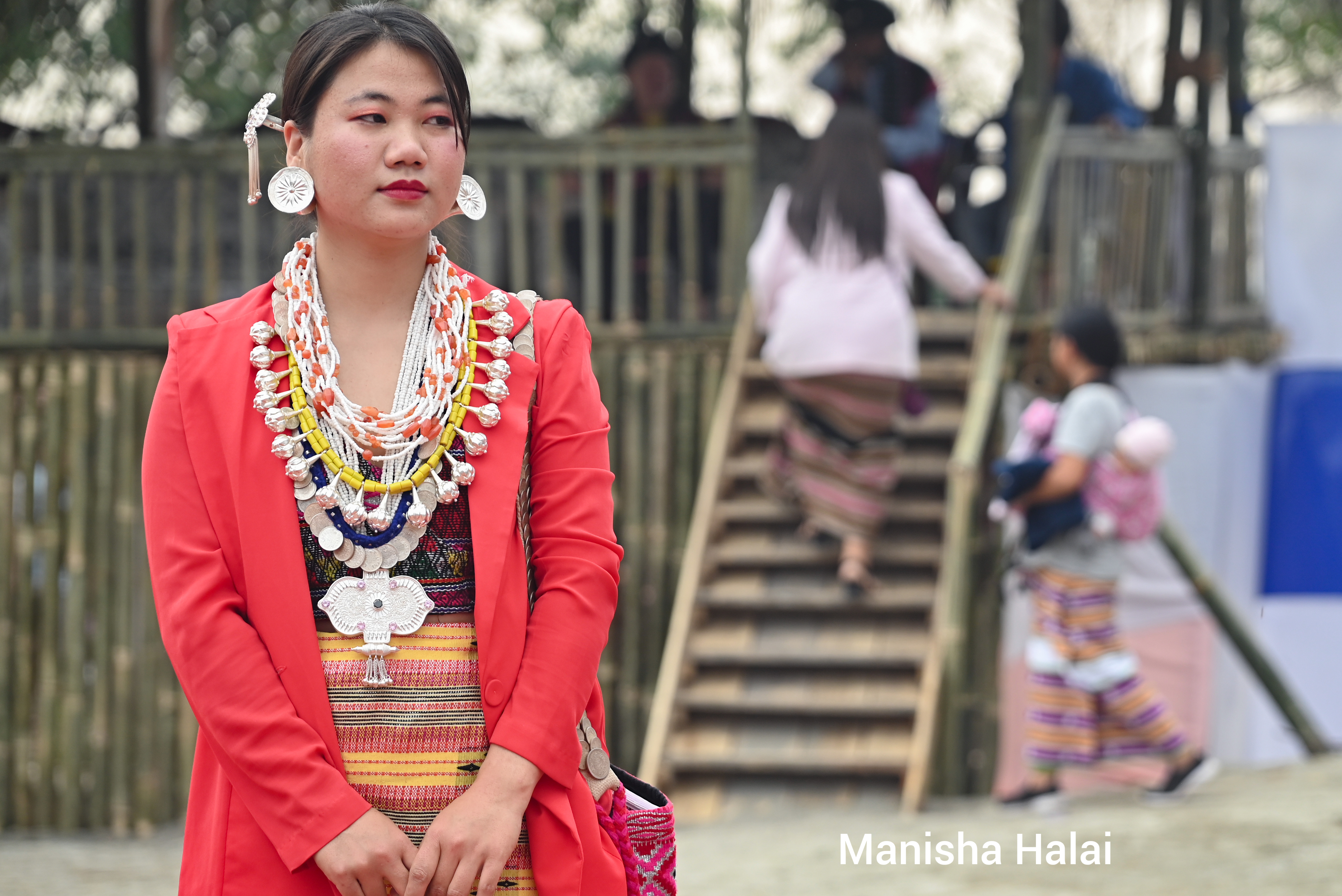
Miju Mishmi Tribe celebrates the Tamla Du Festival.

The Tamla Du Festival is celebrated on 15 February every year by the Miju Mishmis to worship the God and seeking protection from natural calamities, and to pray for the welfare of people, crops, and domestic animals, with the supreme deity being Amik Matai. The festival began to be celebrated annually in 1972 as a prayer to nature for prosperity and safety against natural disasters. Throughout the festival there are performances of the Tanggong dance, a popular traditional folk dance. This dance is also performed during festival of Tano Changrang. Both genders can take part in the dance. Male and female dancers put on colourful costumes and ornaments. This dance now-a-days is performed for reception.

== Economy ==
Since ancient times, the Miju Mishmis were merchants, depending on trade with their neighbors. There is historical proof of this tribe having trade links with Tibet and the Chutiya kingdom. There are many swords, bronze plates, ear rings, bangles, gongs and similar things with Chinese and Tibetan inscriptions. These commodities are held in high value and are hoarded by almost every household as precious possessions used in a host of ceremonies, marriage and business purposes.

The major economic activities of the tribe in recent times have been timber and forest resources like medicinal herbs (the most well-known of which is Mishmi Teeta) and other forest products, cultivation of cash crops like elaichi and ginger, horticultural crops like oranges, pineapples and other fruits. The production of elaichi, ginger and oranges constitute a major portion of the tribe's economy.

The other significant contributors to the economy are government services and government contracts. The use of timber received a big setback in the 1990s when the Supreme court of India banned the felling of trees owing to excessive deforestation in the state. Opium is another significant contributor to the tribe's economy. Despite the ban by the government the production of the drug goes undeterred as the people find no ethical question on the usage of the same. In fact it is considered better than wine most of the time. Animal husbandry is another major source of income in the tribe. Mithuns (a species of bison) are a highly valued animal used prominently as price of bride, meat, and host of other trading purposes. Other livestock include hens, goats, and cows which almost every household owns.

=== Slavery ===
Descent-based slavery has been practiced by the Miju Mishmi people, emerging from the need for additional assistance in their agricultural practices. As a result, the Miju society fractured into two divisions: the masters, called too, and the enslaved people, called mungra. The phrase "mungra mat ka-phat" (transl. the gall bladder of mungra is ruptured) was used by the slave-owners to justify slavery and depict slaves as unintelligent.

Slavery was used as a punishment for various crimes, such as debt. Enslaved peoples would live with their slave-owners, ate the same food, and wore similar clothing.

Marriage amongst slaves was restricted. Marrying free-born people was prohibited, preventing any upward social mobility.

Slavery was abolished in India in the 1950s. Many Miju slaves relocated to Poma in the Lohit district.

== Notable Miju Mishmi people ==
- Kalikho Pul, Chief Minister of Arunachal Pradesh
