= Hruso language =

Language

Hruso
- Angka(e), Gusso, Hrusso, Tenae
- Aka
- Native to: Arunachal Pradesh, India
- Region: Southeast Kameng, Bichom River Valley
- Ethnicity: Hruso
- Native speakers: 3,000 (2007) perhaps including Levai
- Language family: Sino-Tibetan? isolate?: Hrusish?; Hruso
- Dialects: Levai?
- Writing system: Latin

Language codes
- ISO 639-3: hru
- Glottolog: hrus1242
- ELP: Hruso

Hruso, also known as Aka (Angka), is a language of Arunachal Pradesh, India. Long assumed to be a Sino-Tibetan language, it may actually be a language isolate. It is spoken by 3,000 people in 21 villages in Thrizino Circle, West Kameng District. The Hruso people inhabit areas of South East Kameng and are concentrated in the Bichom River Valley, and speak English, Hindi, and Miji in addition to Hruso.

Bangru (Ləvai), spoken on the Tibetan border, might be related to Hruso, but it seems more likely that it is a dialect of Miji.

== Locations ==
According to the Ethnologue, Hruso is spoken in the following villages of Thrizino circle, West Kameng district, Arunachal Pradesh, in India.

- Jamiri
- Husigaon
- Gohainthan
- Buragaon
- Karangonia
- Raindogonia
- Yayom
- Gijiri
- Dijungonia
- Tulu
- Palatari
- Raghupam
- Tania
- Khuppi
- Bhalukpong
- Balipho
- Palizi

Hruso is also spoken in Pisang village, Seppa circle, East Kameng district.

== Status ==
Ethnologue lists the language as 6b, or "threatened", The same can be said on another example, where ELP, or Endangered Languages Project, with a 20% certainty also lists it as "threatened."

== Dialects/varieties ==
The book Hruso by Robert Shafer, notes the two dialects that Hruso is divided into. The first one is known to be recorded by Campbell and the second dialect is known to be recorded by Anderson, Hesslmeyer, and Payne. Also Dialect A has some differentiation in vocabulary when compared to Dialect B. Dialect A is also known to be briefly recorded and is more archaic than dialect B which has very little recording evidence behind it.

Dialects A 1 Anderson hhu, k' k'ii "water ", Hess. xu. And. diaha (p. 9), diak'a (17) " to-morrow ". And. yo " to-day ", ya " now ". And. k'sesi " goat " (6), k's8 (18), H. kisie, P. k'esi, k'isi. Camp. gle " foot ", P. -ksi, si-, si, And. -si, H. si. 2 To chew; p. 17, to eat. 3 In na-yu "ear emerald ". 4 The consonant seems to be palatalized in this root in some languages and the vowel perhaps umlauted, both perhaps due to the following *-s. But these languages are too poorly recorded to form a basis for a conclusion.
