= Miju languages =

Proposed Sino-Tibetan language family

Miju
- Kman-Meyor, Geman, Southern Mishmi
- (proposed)
- Geographic distribution: Arunachal Pradesh
- Ethnicity: Miju Mishmi
- Linguistic classification: Sino-Tibetan: Miju
- Subdivisions: Kaman (Midzu, Miju); Zakhring (Meyor)

Language codes
- Glottolog: gema1234

The Miju (Midžu, Miju, Mijhu), Kaman–Meyor, Midžuish, Southern Mishmi, or Geman languages are a small proposed family of Sino-Tibetan languages spoken by the Kaman (Miju Mishmi) people of southeastern Tibet and Arunachal Pradesh. The languages are Kaman (Midzu/Miju) and Zakhring (Meyor). Although Zakhring appears to be Sino-Tibetan, Kaman may be more divergent. Blench and Post (2011) believe that Zakhring is an East Bodish language that has been influenced by Midzu or other divergent languages of the region, whereas Kaman may be a language isolate.

Blench (2015) suggests that Meyor (Zakhring) and Kman may each be language isolates. Blench argues that the lexical similarities between Kaman and Zakhring are borrowings, and that Zakhring had borrowed heavily from Kaman and Tibetic, and then later borrowed from Naga languages and Jingpho as well.

Regardless, they are not closely related to the Northern Mishmi also known as Digaro languages.
