= Digaro Mishmi language =

Digarish language spoken in India and China

Digaro Mishmi
- Tawra, Taraon
- tɑ31 rɑŋ53, da31 raŋ53, tɯŋ53
- Pronunciation: [tɑ˧˩ rɑŋ˥˧], [da˧˩ raŋ˥˧], [tɯŋ˥˧]
- Native to: India, China
- Region: Arunachal
- Ethnicity: Mishmi people
- Native speakers: (35,000 cited 2001 census)
- Language family: Digarish (Mishmic)? Isolate?: Digaro Mishmi

Language codes
- ISO 639-3: mhu
- Glottolog: diga1241
- ELP: Digaro-Mishmi
- Taraon is classified as Vulnerable by the UNESCO Atlas of the World's Languages in Danger.

Digaro, also Taraon, Tawra, or Darang, is a Digarish language of northeastern Arunachal Pradesh, India and Zayü County, Tibet, China.

== Names ==
According to Jiang, et al. (2013:2), their autonym is tɑ31 rɑŋ53 or da31 raŋ53, and alternatively tɯŋ53 (Deng 登, 僜) in China. The Kaman (Miju) call them tɕi31 moŋ35, the Idu call them tɑ31 rɑŋ35, and the Assamese call them Digaro Mishmi.

== Classification ==
Digaro is classified by Blench (2024) as an isolate, rejecting a supposed "Digarish" relationship between it and Idu Mishmi as one caused by past bilingualism.

== Distribution ==
=== India ===
In Arunachal Pradesh, India, Digaro Mishmi is spoken in Hayuliang, Changlagam, and Goiliang circles in the Amjaw district (Ethnologue). It is also spoken in Dibang Valley district and Assam.

=== China ===
Jiang, et al. (2013:2) reports that in Zayü County, Tibet, Taraon is spoken in the following villages.

- E River watershed 额河流域
  - Jiyu village 吉玉村 (alternatively named Juyu 巨玉)
  - Ciba village 次巴村
  - Rusu village 如苏村
  - Demen village 德门村
  - Zigeng village 自更村
  - Xiani village 下尼村
  - Ba'antong 巴安通
  - Xin village 新村
- Sang'ang River watershed 桑昂河流域
  - Gayao village 嘎尧村
- Chayu River watershed 察隅河流域
  - Dongchong 洞冲, Lower Chayu town 下察隅镇

== Phonology ==
=== Consonants ===
Consonant phonemes
		Labial	Alveolar	(Alveolo-) palatal	Velar	Glottal
Nasal		m	n		ŋ	
Plosive	voiceless	p	t		k	ʔ
Plosive	aspirated	pʰ	tʰ		kʰ	
Plosive	voiced	b	d		ɡ	
Affricate	voiceless		ts	tɕ		
Affricate	aspirated		tsʰ	tɕʰ		
Affricate	voiced		dz	dʑ		
Fricative			s	ɕ		h
Approximant		w	ɹ	j		
Lateral			l			

=== Vowels ===
Monophthong phonemes
	Front	Central	Back
Close	i	ɨ	u
Mid	e		o
Open		a	

- /ɨ/ may also be heard as [ɯ].
- /a/ may also be heard as [ʌ] before /k/.
