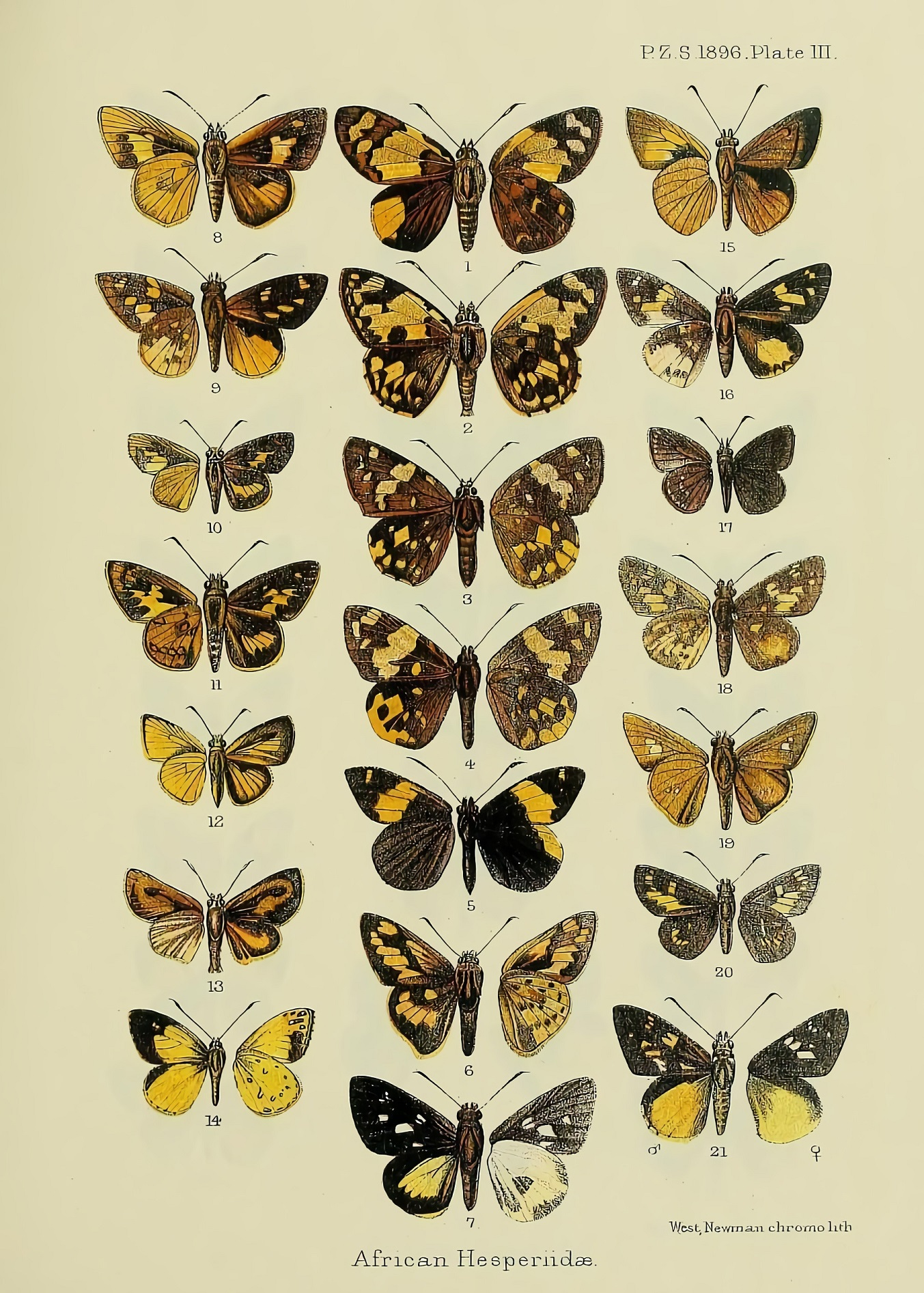
- Teniorhinus harona figure 13

Scientific classification
- Domain: Eukaryota
- Kingdom: Animalia
- Phylum: Arthropoda
- Class: Insecta
- Order: Lepidoptera
- Family: Hesperiidae
- Genus: Teniorhinus
- Species: T. harona

Binomial name
- Teniorhinus harona (Westwood, 1881)

Synonyms
- Pamphila harona Westwood, 1881; Pamphila ruso Mabille, 1891; Oxypalpus [Pamphila] ruso var. merops Weymer, 1901

= Teniorhinus harona =

Species of butterfly

Teniorhinus harona, the arrowhead orange or arrowhead skipper, is a butterfly in the family Hesperiidae. It is found in Angola, the Democratic Republic of the Congo (Shaba), Tanzania, Zambia, Malawi, Mozambique, Zimbabwe and Botswana. The habitat consists of deciduous woodland and Brachystegia woodland.

Adults of both sexes are attracted to flowers and males mud-puddle. Adults are on wing from August to October and from December to May in two generations per year.

The larvae feed on Brachystegia boehmii.
