= Miji languages =

Language cluster

Miji
- Sajolang
- Dhammai
- Native to: India
- Region: Arunachal Pradesh, India and Shannan Prefecture, China
- Ethnicity: Miji people
- Native speakers: 28,000 (2007)
- Language family: possibly Sino-Tibetan?: Hrusish?; Mijiic; Miji
- Dialects: East Miji (Namrai); West Miji (Sajolang)

Language codes
- ISO 639-3: sjl
- Glottolog: saja1240
- ELP: Sajalong

Miji, also given the dialect names Sajolang and Dhammai, is a dialect cluster traditionally counted as one of the Sino-Tibetan languages that is spoken in Arunachal Pradesh, northeastern India. The varieties are not particularly close, with only half of the vocabulary in common between the languages of East Kameng District and West Kameng District. Previously classified as Sino-Tibetan languages, Miji and the recently discovered Bangru language may instead form a small independent language family.

== Varieties ==
There are two divergent varieties of Miji:

- Western Miji: spoken in and around Nafra and Thrizino circles, West Kameng District. Western Miji speakers refer to themselves as the Sajalang (sadʑalaŋ) or Dhəmmai (ðəmmai) (Bodt & Lieberherr 2015:70).
- Eastern Miji: spoken in Lada Circle, East Kameng District. Eastern Miji speakers refer to themselves as the Nəmrai (nəmrai) (Bodt & Lieberherr 2015:70).

Bangru (treated in a separate article), sometimes called "Northern Miji", is more divergent.

== Distribution ==
According to Ethnologue, Miji is spoken in the following areas of Arunachal Pradesh.

- West Kameng District, Nafra circle, Bichom and Pakesa river valley – 25 villages including Debbing, Ditchik, Rurang, Nachinghom, Upper Dzang, Naku, Khellong, Dibrick, Nizong, Najang, Zangnaching, Chalang, Nafra, and Lower Dzang
- East Kameng District: Bameng and Lada circles – Wakke, Nabolong, Kojo, Rojo, Sekong, Panker, Zarkam, Drackchi, Besai, Naschgzang, Sachung, Gerangzing, Kampaa, Salang, Pego, and Dongko villages

I.M. Simon (1979:iii) lists the following Miji villages from the Census of 1971.

1. Chalang [Cinlang]
2. Díbín [Díbín]
3. Ditchik [Dícik]
4. Dzang [Dzang]
5. Jangnachin [Zanachin]
6. Khazolang
7. Khelong
8. Laphozu
9. Mathow
10. Nakhu
11. Nachibun
12. Nizung
13. Rurang

Smaller hamlets include Dishin [Dícin], Devrik [Dívih], Diyung [Diyong], Nazang [Natsang], Nanthalang, and Otung [Uthung]. Some Mijis have also live in Aka villages such as Dijungania, Buragaon, Tulu, Sarkingonia, and Yayung.

== Phonology ==
=== Consonants ===
In all Miji varieties the "p" "t" and "k" sounds are always aspirated.

Consonant phonemes
		Labial	Dental	Alveolar	Palato- alveolar	Retroflex	Palatal	Velar	Glottal
Nasal		m		n		ɳ	ɲ	ŋ	
Plosive	voiceless	pʰ		tʰ		ʈʰ		kʰ	ʔ
Plosive	voiced	b		d		ɖ		ɡ	
Affricate	voiceless			ts	tʃ		tɕ		
Affricate	voiced			dz	dʒ				
Fricative	voiceless	f	θ	s	ʃ	ʂ		x	h
Fricative	voiced	v	ð	z	ʒ	ʐ	ʑ		ɦ
Lateral fricative	voiceless			ɬ					
Lateral fricative	voiced			ɮ					
Rhotic				r		ɽ			
Approximant		ʋ		l, ɫ		ɭ	j	w	

=== Vowels ===
Monophthong phonemes
	Front	Central	Back
Close	i	ə~ɨ	u
Close-mid	e	ə~ɨ	o
Open-mid	ɛ		ʌ • ɔ
Open		a~ɑ	

=== Tones ===
The Miji languages have a relatively simple tonal system with only two tones: high and low. There is a third rising tone but it is so scarcely used that in some of the languages it is disregarded completely.
