= Bangru language =

Hrusish language spoken in India and Tibet

Bangru
- Ləvai
- Tadə Baŋru
- Native to: India, China
- Region: Arunachal Pradesh, Tibet
- Native speakers: 1,500 (2015)
- Language family: possibly Sino-Tibetan?: Hrusish?; Mijiic; Bangru

Language codes
- ISO 639-3: None (mis)
- Glottolog: bang1369
- ELP: Levai

Bangru (Tadə Baŋru or Tadʑu Baŋru), also known as Ləvai (Ləwjɛ) and occasionally as Northern Miji is a language spoken in Sarli Circle, northern Kurung Kumey District by 1,500 people. Long unclassified due to poor documentation, it turns out to be related to the Miji languages.

== Distribution ==
Blench (2015), citing Ramya (2012), lists the Bangru (Northern Miji) villages Bala, Lee, Lower Lichila, Upper Lichila, Machane, Milli, Molo, Nade, Namju, Palo, Rerung, Sape, Sate (saːtəː), Wabia, and Walu’, as well as Sarli Town. Traditionally, the Bangru lived in the 'thirteen Bangru villages' (Bangru language: ləwjɛː neːpeː rəŋleː kətə̃ĩŋ). The linguistic zone where the Bangru language is used is the northern part of the hilly region of the Kurung Kumey district, mainly comprising the adjacent villages of the Sarli circle.

In China, Bangru (transcribed in Chinese as Bengru 崩如) is spoken in the area of Bixia 比夏, southern Longzi County 隆子县, Shannan Prefecture 山南地区, Tibet — in the villages of Jieli 结列, Baluo 巴洛, Xiade 夏德, Li 利, Lilaqi 利拉齐, and Gelangge 嘎朗洛 (Li 2003). Bangru is also spoken by many of the nearby Sulung people, who live in San'an Qulin Township 三安曲林乡 of Longzi County. Names of Bangru include ləʔ˧˩ wai˥ (autonym), pɤn˧˩ ru˥ (Bangni exonym), and bu˧ zuai˥ bi˧ (Sulung exonym). There are also 6 people living in Douyu Village No. 1 (斗玉一村) on the Chinese side. Li (2003) reports that there are about 1,600 Bangru people as of 1980, and about 2,000 as of 2003.

As with more than 90% of the residents of Kurung Kumey District, most Bangru speakers can also speak Nyasang, a Nyishi language variety. Bangru speakers make up about 40% of the population of Sarli circle, which also has small numbers of Puroik speakers.

The Bangru refer to themselves as the taːdə or taːdʑuː baŋruː, and to the Eastern Miji and Western Miji as waːduː baŋruː. The Bangru claim that they are the descendants of one of the sons of the Grandmother Sun (ʔaseː lədʑuwjɛː), while the Miji are the descendants of the other son who migrated to the Lada Circle area in East Kameng district. There are five Bangru clans:

- Pisa (pədʑoː dʑuː)
- Melo (məloː dʑuː)
- Tagang (təgaŋ dʑuː)
- Mili (məli dʑuː)
- Sape (saːpə)

Bangru traditional religion revolved around reverence of the sun and moon ("our Grandfather Moon" ʔaloː ləbãĩ and "our Grandmother Sun" ʔaseː lədʑuwjɛː; see also Donyi-Polo), but it is now being replaced by Christianity.
