= Miju language =

Sino-Tibetan language spoken in India and China

Kaman
- Geman, Kman
- Miju, Kùmán
- Pronunciation: [kɯ˧˩mɑn˧˥]
- Region: Arunachal Pradesh, India
- Ethnicity: Miju Mishmi
- Native speakers: 18,000 (2006)
- Language family: possibly Sino-Tibetan (Midzuish), or a language isolate: Kaman

Language codes
- ISO 639-3: mxj
- Glottolog: miju1243
- ELP: Miju-Mishmi

Kaman (Geman, Geman Deng, Kùmán, Kman), or Miju (Miju, Mishmi, Midzu), is a small language of India and China. Long assumed to be a Sino-Tibetan language, it may be a language isolate.

== Locations ==
In China, the Miju are known as the Deng 僜人. The Deng number over 1,000 in Zayü County, Tibet, China, with 1,000 of the Deng having the autonym tɑ31 ruɑŋ53 (大让), and 130 having the autonym kɯ31 mɑn35 (格曼) (Geman). They are also neighbors with the Idu or i53 du31 (义都) people.

A prayer song of Miju Mishmi people of Arunachal Pradesh, India, praying the Almighty Amik Matai.

In India, Miju is spoken in Hawai Circle and the Parsuram Kund area of Lohit District, Arunachal Pradesh (Boro 1978, Dasgupta 1977). Ethnologue reports that Miju is spoken in 25 villages located in high altitude areas to the east of upper Lohit and Dau valleys, which are located east of the Haguliang, Billong, and Tilai valleys.

== Phonology ==
These are the sounds in the Miju/Kaman language.

=== Consonants ===
Consonant phonemes
		Labial	Alveolar	Post- alveolar	Retroflex	Palatal	Velar	Glottal
Nasal		m	n			ɲ	ŋ	
Plosive	plain	p	t				k	ʔ
Plosive	aspirated	pʰ	tʰ				kʰ	
Plosive	voiced	b	d				ɡ	
Affricate	plain		ts	tʃ				
Affricate	aspirated			tʃʰ				
Affricate	voiced		dz	dʒ				
Fricative	plain	f	s	ʃ				h
Fricative	voiced	v	z					ɦ
Approximant		ʋ				j	w	
Lateral			l		ɭ			
Flap			ɾ		ɽ			

=== Vowels ===
Monophthong phonemes
	Front	Central	Back	
	Front	Central	unrounded	rounded
Close	i	(ɨ)	ɯ	u
Close-mid				o
Open-mid	ɛ	ə	ʌ	ɔ
Open		a		

/ɯ/ may also be heard as [ɨ].

=== Tones ===
There are three main tones in the Miju language, rising (á), falling (à), and level (ā).

== Registers ==
Kman has various registers that are used in different situations. These include:

=== Shamanic ===
Shamanic register is used by Shamans during rituals and is made up of a series of lexical substitutions and periphrasic constructions, the original of these are often speculated to be from an archaic version of the language or another language but this cannot be proven.

Regular Speech	Shamanic Register	English
ìkū	àbrí ànà, àbí tòmbō, kùbū mə̄yī	dog
aya	ìdūmīlī	daughter
pàkū	khə̀njé ēndō	agriculture

=== Hunting ===
Hunting register is used by hunters and when hunting large and dangerous animals such as takin it is the only form of speech that can be used. Hunting register consists of lexical substitutions of words mostly but not exclusively relating to hunting.

Regular Speech	Hunting Register	English
khyām	brīmā kāyōŋ	takin
dīʔìŋ	yēlkā	ginger
sīŋshūl	khūŋzèʔ	gun

Other meters include:

- cursing and scolding
- poetic
- babytalk
- mediation
- mourning
