= Hrusish languages =

Sino-Tibetan language branch of India

Hrusish
- Southeast Kamengic; Hruso-Miji
- Geographic distribution: Arunachal Pradesh
- Linguistic classification: Sino-Tibetan?
- Subdivisions: Hruso (Aka); Mijiic

Language codes
- Glottolog: hrus1242 (Hruso) miji1239 (Miji)

The Hrusish or Southeast Kamengic languages possibly constitute a Sino-Tibetan branch in Arunachal Pradesh, northeast India. They are Hruso (Aka) and Mijiic. In Glottolog, Hammarström, et al. does not accept Hrusish, and considers similarities between Hruso and Miji to be due to loanwords.

== Names ==
George van Driem (2014) and Bodt & Lieberherr (2015) use the name Hrusish, while Anderson (2014) prefers Southeast Kamengic.

== Classification ==
Anderson (2014) considers Hrusish to be a branch of Tibeto-Burman. However, Blench and Post (2011) suggest that the Hruso languages likely constitute an independent language family.

Bodt's & Lieberherr's (2015:69) internal classification of the Hrusish languages is as follows.

- Hrusish
  - Hruso (ʁuso, Aka)
  - Miji-Bangru
    - Western Miji (Đəmmai, Sadʑalaŋ)
    - Eastern Miji (Nəmrai, Wadu Baŋru)
    - Bangru (Tadə Baŋru, Tadʑu Baŋru, Ləwjɛ, Ləvai)

== Comparative vocabulary ==
The following comparative vocabulary table of Hrusish vocabulary items (Bangru, Miji, and Hruso) is from Anderson (2014), with additional Bangru data from Li (2003). Anderson's (2014) Hruso data is from Anderson's own field notes and from Simon (1970). Anderson's (2014) Miji data is from his own field notes as well as Simon (1979) and Weedall (2014). Bangru data is from Ramya (2011, 2012).

Gloss	Bangru (Li 2003)	Bangru (Anderson 2014)	Miji (Anderson 2014)	Hruso (Anderson 2014)
sun	dʑu˥wai˥˧	dʒu	dʒo ~ zuʔ; zo ~ ʒʲoʔ	dʒu ~ dʑu; dʲu
snow	də˧˩ɣai˥	tene	dɨlen; təlɛn	tʰiɲɲo
ashes	laʔ˥bu˥˧	lag-bow	maj-bu	xukʰes-pu
mother's brother	-	kiː-ni	a-kʰiw; akju	a-kʰi
son	mə˧˩dʑu˥	mu-dʒu-ɲiːib	zu	sou ~ sa ~ seu
I	ȵoŋ˥	ɲo(ʔ)	ɲaŋ	nɔ
we	ga˧˩ni˥	k-aɲi	aɲi	ɲi
bear	si˥tsuaŋ˥	sutʃow	ʃutsaŋ	sitso ~ sutso
insect(s)	bə˧˩loŋ˥	beloŋ-siɲi	biluʔŋ; bəɫuʔŋ; biluŋʰ	bəlu
nose	mə˧˩ȵi˧guaŋ˥˧	mi-niː-ko	ɲi	un-su ~ nu-su
hand	mə˧˩gai˥	me-gej	(mə)gi	əgzə
thumb ('hand' + 'mother')	-	me-gej-nea	gi-nuiʔ; gi-batʃo	əgzə-i-aɲ
saliva, spit	-	je	ʒeʔ	ze-mdʑiu; əʒʲəxu ~ əɣʲəxu
sleep	dʑe˥	zeu	dʒi	dʒum
dream	dai˥mu˧˩mu˥	tjameiː	tajme	tʰimjeu
four	bu˧˩rai˥	poraji	bli; b(ə)le	pʰiri; pʰiji
five	buŋ˥	puŋ	bungu, buŋu	pʰum ~ pʰóm
six	rai˥˧	reh	reʔ; reʔ ~ réʔ	rijɛ; ʑje
seven	muai˥˧	moji	myaʔ, mjaʔ	mrjo; mrɔ
eight	sə˧˩cai˥˧	sagaik	sɨgiʔ, sɨgeʔ; səguj	səgzə ~ sɨgdʒɨ ~ sɨɣdʒɨ
nine	sə˧˩təŋ˥	sataŋ	sɨtʰɨn; stʰɨn; stən	stʰə; stʰɨ ~ stʰə
ten	rəŋ˥	raŋ	lin; lən	ʁə; ʁɨ ~ ʁə
bow	-	karaik	gɨriʔ; gəri	kʰiri
dry	mə˧˩ci˥	miː-kji	mɨ-kʰyang; məkjaŋ	kʰrou
mother	a˧˩nai˥˧	aːneja	aɲʲi	aɲi; aɲ
red	ja˧˩dʑu˥˧	ja-tʃuk	mu-tsu	tsu
stream	-	wu-dʒu	vu-zuʔ 'creek'	xu-sa
shoulder	mə˧˩pu˥zi˥	m-podʒ	pas-t(ʰ)uŋ; pastoŋ	ə-pos-tu
finger	mə˧˩gai˥tsuo˥˧	me-gej-tʃowa	gi-tsoʔ; məgitso	əgzi-tsə
pig	ʑəu˥˧	dʒu	ʒo; ʒoʔ	vo
bird ('bird' + 'son/child')	pu˥dʑu˧˩	pu-dʒu	buzu(ʔ); bɨ-zɨ ~ b-zɨ ~ bə-zu ~ bə-zə; bə-zuʔ	mu-su
seed	-	mete	tʰei-zʰo; (me)tẽ	isi; dʒʲe; ʃe-die

== Reconstruction ==
Proto-Hrusish has been reconstructed in by Bodt & Lieberherr (2015). Bodt & Lieberherr (2015:101) note that Proto-Hrusish displays a sound change from Proto-Tibeto-Burman *s- to t-, which they note had also occurred in Bodo-Garo, Kuki-Chin, Tangkhulic, Central Naga, and Karbi languages. The Proto-Tibeto-Burman *-l and -r have also been lost in Proto-Hrusish.

Reconstructed Proto-Hrusish forms from Bodt & Lieberherr (2015) are given below.

- *nə-paŋ 'aconite'
- *si-ni 'ant'
- *pri 'awake'
- *bə-ru(d͡ziŋ) 'axe'
- *mə-niŋ 'bad'
- *bra 'bamboo (big)'
- *(g)o-prja 'bark (tree)'
- *sə-t͡saŋ 'bear'
- *majk 'bee'
- *mə-doʔ 'big (thick, wide)'
- *bə-dow 'bird'
- *taʔ 'bite'
- *kam 'bitter'
- *jaC 'blood'
- *mə-muC 'body'
- *lu 'boil (water)'
- *mə-ri-jaŋ 'bone'
- *gə-raj 'bow'
- *mə-nuŋ 'breast; milk'
- *(nam)sjaj 'broom'
- *su 'cane; rope'
- *dowC 'chicken'
- *mə-ga-daʔ 'chin'
- *gi-le 'cloth'
- *majməwŋ 'cloud'
- *ku 'cook'
- *su 'cow'
- *kraC 'cry'
- *taj 'cut'
- *ga 'day'
- *mə-ruk 'deep'
- *θəj 'die'
- *taC 'dig'
- *ni-t͡ɕi 'dirty'
- *ru 'do'
- *piŋ 'door'
- *tai-mə 'dream'
- *tuŋ 'drink'
- *t͡ɕa 'eat'
- *do-riŋ 'egg'
- *sə-giC 'eight'
- *(a/mə)ko 'elder brother'
- *mə-hi-laŋ 'empty'
- *t͡səj 'excrete, defecate'
- *mə-jaʔ 'eye'
- *mə-rəŋ 'far'
- *mə-baC 'fat (n)'
- *ri 'fear'
- *mejʔ 'few'
- *rəj 'fight'
- *mə-guC-t͡ɕoʔ 'finger'
- *maj 'fire'
- *laC 'fireplace'
- *trV 'fish'
- *bə-ŋu 'five'
- *mə-boC 'flower'
- *mə-d͡ʑoC 'friend'
- *d͡ʑuC 'frog'
- *θai 'fruit'
- *bə-ləj 'four'
- *liŋ 'full'
- *kikmuŋ 'garlic, onion'
- *bəj 'give'
- *se-preN 'goat'
- *rajC 'grind, crush'
- *mə-luŋ 'guts'
- *go-pu 'hair'
- *mə-gaŋ-lo 'hard'
- *mə-guC 'hand, arm'
- *du 'have, exist'
- *mə-go-kuŋ 'head'
- *mə-luŋ-wəwC 'heart'
- *mə-ləj 'heavy'
- *mə-su 'horn'
- *nam 'house'
- *kə-na 'how many'
- *niC 'human'
- *bə-luŋ 'hundred'
- *noC 'ill'
- *bəw-luŋ 'insect'
- *suN 'iron'
- *gə-d͡ʑuk 'itch'
- *dəgraŋ 'kick'
- *gajC 'kill'
- *vaj-t͡suŋ 'knife'
- *ni 'know'
- *toC 'laugh'
- *mə-rajC 'leaf'
- *lə-wajC 'leech'
- *laj 'leg'
- *laŋ 'lift'
- *mə-lə-taŋ 'light'
- *t͡ɕi 'liquor'
- *rej 'listen, hear'
- *siŋ 'live, grow up'
- *mə-θin 'liver'
- *mə-pjaŋ 'long'
- *gaŋ 'look, see'
- *saC 'louse'
- *daj 'make; do'
- *niC 'man (male)'
- *su 'meat'
- *lu 'month'
- *lu 'moon'
- *mə-nuŋ 'mouth; language'
- *lu-lV 'mortar'
- *me-naj 'mother'
- *mə-mjiŋ 'name'
- *mə-nej 'near'
- *ta- 'negative imperative'
- *mə-gə-nu 'new'
- *nə-gaC 'night'
- *sə-tiŋ 'nine'
- *mə-ɕoʔ 'old'
- *a-ken 'one'
- *an 'paddy rice'
- *bə-laC 'pestle'
- *jowʔ 'pig'
- *go-kuN 'pillow'
- *nə-dəj; *pro 'rain'
- *t͡ɕaʔ 'red'
- *gə-leC 'ring'
- *lam-baŋ 'road'
- *mə-kriŋ 'root'
- *mə-də-rəw 'round'
- *lu 'salt'
- *sə-gə-raj 'sand'
- *mə-θai 'seed'
- *laC 'sell'
- *mə-ljak 'seven'
- *k(r)iC 'sew'
- *mə-nuŋ 'short'
- *mə-ma 'sister (elder)'
- *d͡ʑuC 'sit, stay'
- *reC 'six'
- *mə-prja 'skin'
- *nə-də-laŋ 'sky'
- *d͡ʑV 'sleep'
- *maj-kən 'smoke (n)'
- *bəw 'snake'
- *dəren 'snow'
- *mə-lə-prjuC 'soft, smooth'
- *naʔ 'soil'
- *təwC 'speak'
- *d͡ʑuŋ 'spear'
- *məsu 'spicy'
- *jeʔ 'spittle'
- *gu 'stand'
- *lə-t͡ɕuŋ 'star'
- *kə 'steal'
- *t͡ɕuŋ 'storehouse, granary'
- *mə-gə-raŋ 'straight'
- *bə-nuŋ 'suck'
- *d͡ʑuʔ 'sun'
- *bə-ljaC 'swallow'
- *mə-jaŋ 'sweet'
- *liŋ 'swell'
- *wa '(swidden) field'
- *d͡ʑaC 'swim'
- *mə-lə-mrjaj 'tail'
- *ləw 'take'
- *t͡ɕaC 'tell'
- *rəŋ 'ten'
- *paj-t͡ɕi 'that'
- *pu-t͡ɕi 'that (lower)'
- *mə-lu 'thigh'
- *huŋ 'this'
- *gə-θəm 'three'
- *gə-d͡ʑuC 'thorn'
- *bə-laj 'tongue'
- *mə-taC 'tooth'
- *(g)o-naj 'tree'
- *gə-niC 'two'
- *an-lə-giN 'uncooked rice'
- *pen 'vegetable'
- *mu 'vomit'
- *daj 'walk'
- *t͡ɕaC 'hot, warm'
- *wi 'water'
- *kua-suʔ 'waterfall'
- *traj 'weave'
- *tiŋ 'what'
- *kəʔ 'where'
- *mə-gə-raN 'white'
- *θu 'who'
- *low 'wind'
- *gə/mə-t͡ɕəwC 'wing'
- *d͡ʑVru 'with'
- *(g)o 'wood'
- *nəməraj 'woman'
- *də-niŋ 'year'
- *də-gaC 'yesterday'
- *mə-nuŋ 'younger sibling'
- *na(-jaŋ) '1SG'
- *ni '2SG'
- *ʔi '3SG'
- *ka-ni '1PL'
- *d͡ʑV '2PL'
- *na '3PL'

== See also ==
- Hrusish comparative vocabulary lists (Wiktionary)
