= Idu Mishmi language =

Language spoken in India and Tibet

Idu Mishmi
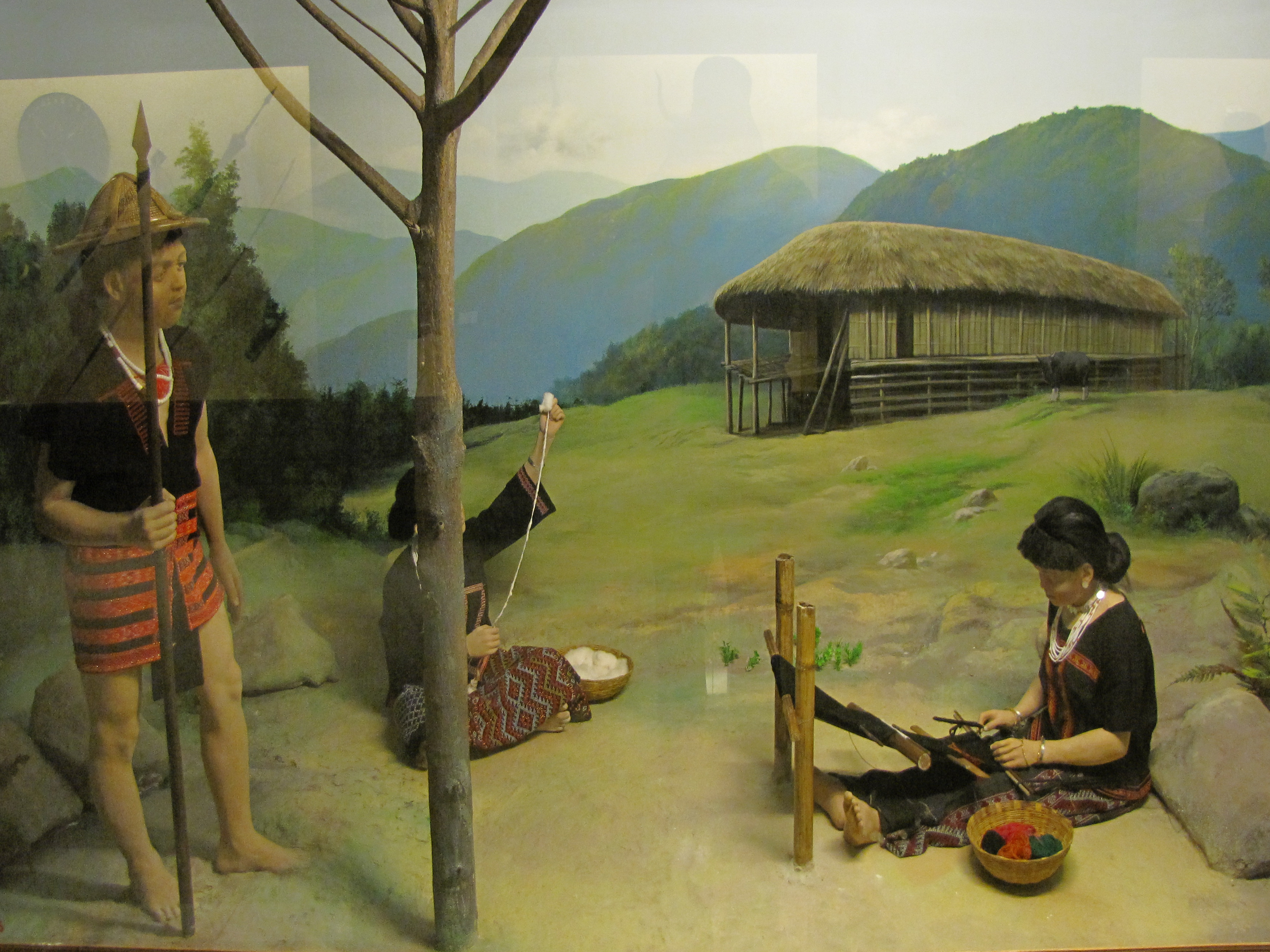
- Diorama and wax figures of Mishmi people in Jawaharlal Nehru Museum, Itanagar
- Region: India: Assam; Arunachal Pradesh: Dibang Valley district, Lower Dibang valley, Lohit; East Siang District; Upper Siang. China: southeastern Tibet Autonomous Region: Nyingchi Prefecture: Zayü County; western Yunnan
- Ethnicity: Mishmi people (categorized as Lhoba and Mishmi)
- Native speakers: (11,000 cited 2001 census)
- Language family: Sino-Tibetan? Isolate?: Greater Siangic?; Digarish?; Idu Mishmi
- Writing system: Latin, Devanagari

Language codes
- ISO 639-3: clk
- Glottolog: idum1241
- ELP: Idu-Mishmi
- Idu Mishmi is classified as Definitely Endangered by the UNESCO Atlas of the World's Languages in Danger.

The Idu Mishmi language is a small language spoken by the Idu Mishmi people in Dibang Valley district, Lower Dibang Valley district, Lohit district, East Siang district, and Upper Siang district of the Indian state of Arunachal Pradesh and in Zayü County of the Tibet Autonomous Region, China. There were 8569 speakers in India in 1981 and 7000 speakers in China in 1994. It is considered an endangered language.

== Religion ==
They follow Animism and Shamanism. Ini Mashelo-Zinu and Nani Intaya are the supreme deities who are worshipped. Idu Mishmis believe that they created the universe and mankind. They also believe in the almighty sun and the divine spirit that governs the universe, spirits that govern nature and have a strong belief in an afterlife and spirit guides. They worship spirits, including benevolent and malevolent ones, and believe in the existence of ghosts. The Idu Mishmi tribe's shaman is called an Igu, and they perform rituals and dances to ensure the safety and health of their families and households. The Igu wears a coat, loin cloth, and an apron-like garment, and uses musical instruments while dancing, chanting, and singing.

== Classification ==
Idu Mishmi has variously been described as Sino-Tibetan or that of one part in a family termed 'Digarish', while Blench (2024) rejects both groupings, arguing that Idu Mishmi is an isolate.

== Locations ==
In China, Idu Mishmi is spoken in Xiba village 西巴村, which has just over 40 residents and is located at the foot of Xikong Mountain 习孔山. Xiba village is located 10 kilometers from the nearest administrative center, namely Migu village 米古村 (Jiang 2005:4). The Idu live in the Danba River 丹巴江 and E River 额河 watersheds in Zayü County, Tibet. They are officially classified by the Chinese government as ethnic Lhoba people.

In India, the Idu are found in Arunachal Pradesh, although after the declaration of Roing as a Township, Adi people migrated south towards Sadiya. Idus followed and occupied the Northern Part of Lower Dibang Valley.

Idu People are believed to have migrated with the Adi from southern Tibet in the early 1700s following footprints.

== Script ==
The Idu Mishmi people did not usually have a script of their own. When needed Idu Mishmis tended to use the Tibetan script. Currently the Idu Mishmi have developed the Latin orthography known as "Idu Azobra".

== Alternative names ==
The Idu Mishmi language is also referred to as:

- Kera’a
- Sulikata by the indigenous Assamese people of the Assam Plains.
- Idu in general.
- Yidu may be used in China.
- Midi by the Adi's.

== Dialects ==
| Dialect name | Alternative name (if any) | Area spoken |
|---|---|---|
| Mindri | | Anini area |
| Mithu | Bebejia | Hunli, Desali, Koronu, Abango, Bhismaknagar, |
| Midu | | Roing, Dambuk, Aohali, Injonu |
| Mihi | | Ahi valley (Anelih) |

== Registers ==
Idu has various registers that are used in different situations. These include:

- shamanic register, known as Igu
- hunting register
- cursing register
- mediation register
- mourning register
- babytalk register
- humorous register
