= Lamo language =

Sino-Tibetan language of Tibet

Lamo
- mBo
- ’Bo skad
- Native to: China
- Region: Zogang County, Chamdo Prefecture, Tibet
- Language family: Sino-Tibetan: (unclassified); Qiangic? rGyalrongic?; Chamdo; Lamo

Language codes
- ISO 639-3: –
- Glottolog: lamo1245

Lamo (also called mBo; IPA: mbo˥; ’Bo skad) is an unclassified Sino-Tibetan language spoken in Tshawarong, Zogang County, Chamdo Prefecture, Tibet. It was recently documented by Suzuki & Nyima (2016). sMad skad, a closely related language variety, is also spoken in Tshawarong.

Suzuki & Nyima (2018) document the Kyilwa (格瓦) variety of Dongba Township (东坝乡).

== Names ==
Lamo is referred to by the Changdu Gazetteer (2005: 819) as Dongba (东坝话), as it is spoken in Dongba Township (东坝乡), Zogang County. Jiang (2022) also refers to the language as Dongba (东坝话).

Khams Tibetan people refer to Lamo speakers as mBo or mBo mi (’bo mi). Traditionally, Lamo speakers also referred to themselves as Po mi, although this autonym is not known by all Lamo speakers. They refer to their own language as Lamo. Some Lamo speakers also refer to their town language as ˊmbo hkə.

Lamo autonyms by location (gSerkhu, discussed below, is a minor mutually intelligible variety):

Language	Autonym	Location
Lamo	[la55 mo55]	Dongba Township 东坝乡, Dzogang County
Lamo	[la55 mɛ53]	Zhonglinka Township 中林卡乡, Dzogang County
gSerkhu	[sə55 khu55]	Shangchayu Town 上察隅镇, Dzayul County

== Demographics ==
Lamo is spoken by about 4,000 speakers, with 2,000 in Dongba Township, and 2,000 in Zhonglinka Township. Both townships are located along the Nujiang River in Dzogang County.

Lamo and gSerkhu villages by township:

Language	Township, County	Villages
Lamo	Dongba Township 东坝乡, Dzogang	Junyong 军拥村, Gewa 格瓦村, Puka 普卡村, Bazuo, and Jiaba 加坝村
Lamo	Zhonglinka Township 中林卡乡, Dzogang	Shizika 十字卡村, Luoba 洛巴村, Ruoba 若巴村, Wadui 瓦堆村, and Wamei 瓦美村
gSerkhu	Shangchayu Town 上察隅镇, Dzayul	Benzhui 本堆村, Muzong, Cuixi 翠兴村, and Sangba

== Dialects ==
There are two dialects:

- Lamo (Tibetan name for the language: mBo-skad)
- Lamei

There are 5 Lamo-speaking village clusters in Dongba Township, which are Kyilwa, Phurkha, Gewa, Gyastod and Gyasmed. The remaining village clusters, out of a total of 13 village clusters in Dongba Township, are Khams Tibetan-speaking villages.

Lamei is spoken by 1,500 to 2,000 people in 5 village clusters in is spoken in Zhonglinka Township. Sitrikhapa, Wangtod, Wangmed, Rongba, and Laba village clusters have only Lamei speakers. Woba, Pula, and Zuoshod village clusters have both Lamei and Khams Tibetan speakers.

gSerkhu is a variety of Lamo, with which it is mutually intelligible. Khams Tibetan speakers refer to the language as Sikhu. gSerkhu is spoken by about 400 people (80 households) in 4 villages of the gSerkhu Valley, which are Benzhui, Muzong, Cuixi, and Sangba, all located in Shangchayu Town, Dzayul County. Dzayul County also has Khams Tibetan speakers who had originally migrated from the Lamo-speaking area of Dongba Township, Dzogang County. Jiang (2022) refers to the language as Suku or Sukuhua (素苦话).

== Classification ==
Suzuki & Nyima (2016, 2018) suggest that Lamo may be a Qiangic language. Guillaume Jacques (2016) suggests that mBo is a rGyalrongic language belonging to the Stau-Khroskyabs (Horpa-Lavrung) branch.

Suzuki & Nyima (2018) note that Lamo is closely related to two other recently documented languages of Chamdo, eastern Tibet, namely Larong (spoken in the Lancang River valley of Zogang County and Markam County) and Drag-yab (spoken in southern Zhag'yab County). These languages together are called the Chamdo languages.

Lamo compared with Written Tibetan and Proto-Tibeto-Burman (Nyima & Suzuki 2019):

Gloss	Lamo	Written Tibetan	Proto-Tibeto-Burman
one	ˉdə	gcig	*tyak ~ *g-t(y)ik
four	ˉlə̰	bzhi	*b-ləy
seven	ˉn̥i	bdun	*s-ni-s
ten	ˉʁɑ	bcu	*ts(y)i(y) ~ *tsyay
you	ˉnə	khyod	*na-ŋ
horse	ˊre	rta	*s/m-rang
blood	ˉse	khrag	*s-hywəy-t
urine	ˉqo	gcin	*kum

== Lexicon ==
Suzuki & Nyima (2016) list the following Lamo words.

Gloss	Lamo
one	də˥
two	na˥
three	sɔ̰̃˩
four	lə̰˥
five	ɴʷɚ̰˥
six	tɕi˩
seven	n̥i˥
eight	ʱdʑə˥
nine	ᵑɡo˥
ten	ʁɑ˥
hundred	ʱdʑi˥
1.SG pronoun	ŋa˥
2.SG pronoun	nə˥
3.SG pronoun	kə˥
blood	sa˥
urine	qo˩
meat	tɕʰi˥
iron	ʰtɕɑ˥
needle	ʁɑ˩
fish	ɲɛ˩ (Tibetic loan)
pig	pʰo˥ ɦu
horse	re˩
sky	nɑ˥
land	sɛ˥ tɕʰɛ (Tibetic loan)
sand	ɕe˩ mɛ (Tibetic loan)
hillside	ɴɢa˥
snow	jʉ˥
road	tɕɯ˥
water	tɕə˥
eat	wə˥-
sleep	nə˥-

== Phonology ==
Suzuki & Nyima (2018) report the phonology of the Kyilwa dialect. They have drawn the conclusion that Lamo "tends to have a different phonetic development from the others".

		Labial	Alveolar		Retroflex	Palatal	Velar	Uvular	Glottal
		Labial	plain	sibilant	Retroflex	Palatal	Velar	Uvular	Glottal
Nasal	voiceless	m̥	n̥			ȵ̊	ŋ̊	ɴ̥	
Nasal	voiced	m	n			ȵ	ŋ	ɴ	
Plosive/ Affricate	tenuis	p	t	ts	ʈ	tɕ	k	q	ʔ
Plosive/ Affricate	aspirated	pʰ	tʰ	tsʰ	ʈʰ	tɕʰ	kʰ	qʰ	
Plosive/ Affricate	voiced	b	d	dz	ɖ	dʑ	g	ɢ	
Continuant	voiceless			s	ʂ	ɕ	x	χ	h
Continuant	voiced			z		ʑ	ɣ	ʁ	ɦ
Approximant	voiceless		l̥						
Approximant	voiced	w	l			j			
Trill			r						

Prenasalisation and preaspiration appear as a preinitial.

	Front	Central	Back	
Close	i	ʉ	ɯ	u
Close-mid	e	ɵ	o	
Mid		ə (ɚ) (əˠ)		
Open-mid	ɛ		ɔ	
Open	a		ɑ	

All of these vowels have creaky and nasalized counterparts. There are a few secondary articulations found marginally, namely retroflexed /ɚ/ and velarized /ə^{ɣ}/.

Syllable structure: ^{c}CGV

The tones are high and rising, the same as in Larong and Drag-yab. The tone bearing unit is the first two syllables of every word. The second syllable is occasionally excluded from the TBU.

== Morphology ==
Directional prefixes in Lamo:

- n-: ˊnə- sə̰ ‘kill’, ˊna-qɑ ‘chew’, ˊnu-pho ‘drop’
- th-: ˊtho-xɯ ‘go’, ˊtho-ndzo ‘gather’, ˊthe-ji ‘sell’
- k-: ˊka-tɵ ‘buy’, ˉko’-ɕa ‘break into pieces’
- t-: ˉtu’-rɑ ‘receive’, ˉtə’-tɕa ‘wear (a hat)’
- l-: ˉla’-mbo ‘overthrow’
- w-: ˉwo’-ɕa ‘tear up’, ˊwu-ndzə ‘eat’

Directional prefixes with le ‘come’ in Lamo:

- ˊne-le: ‘come downwards/come down’
- ˊthe-le: ‘(he) has arrived’ (perfect/aorist only)
- k-: (does not occur)
- ˊtə’-le: ‘arrive upwards/come here close to the speaker’
- ˉle-le: ‘come to a place closer to the speaker but not necessarily near them’
- ˊwu-le: ‘come towards the speaker on the same horizontal level’
