= Drag-yab language =

Sino-Tibetan language

Drag-yab
- Zesong, sMa, rMa
- m̥a^{55}
- Native to: China
- Region: Zhag'yab County, Chamdo Prefecture, Tibet
- Language family: Sino-Tibetan: (unclassified); Qiangic ?; Chamdo; Drag-yab

Language codes
- ISO 639-3: –
- Glottolog: drag1234

Drag-yab is a Sino-Tibetan language recently documented by Suzuki & Nyima (2018, 2019). It is spoken in the southern half of Zhag'yab County, Chamdo, eastern Tibet.

Suzuki & Nyima (2018) document the dialect of Drag-yab spoken in the village of Razi 热孜村 in Xiangdui Town 香堆镇, Zhag'yab County.

== Names ==
Drag-yab is referred to by the Changdu Gazetteer (2005) as Zesong 则松话, and is reported by Changdu (2005) to be spoken in Zesong 则松乡 and Bari 巴日乡 townships of Zhag'yab County.

The language is also referred to as both sMa and rMa. Nyima & Suzuki (2019) report the autonym m̥a55 (or ma55), which is identical to the Larong autonym, also reported by them (m̥a55).

Jiang (2022) lists Mang 芒话 and Maji 玛吉话 as Drag-yab (Chaya 察雅) varieties.

== Classification ==
Suzuki & Nyima (2018) note that Drag-yab is closely related to two other recently documented Sino-Tibetan languages of Chamdo, eastern Tibet, namely Lamo and Larong. Their relationship outside of this group, the Chamdo languages, within the Sino-Tibetan family is still uncertain.

== Phonology ==
Suzuki & Nyima (2018) report the following phonemes from the Razi dialect of Drag-yab.

		Labial	Alveolar		Retroflex	Palatal	Velar	Uvular	Glottal
		Labial	plain	sibilant	Retroflex	Palatal	Velar	Uvular	Glottal
Nasal	voiceless	m̥	n̥			ȵ̊	ŋ̊	ɴ̥	
Nasal	voiced	m	n			ȵ	ŋ	ɴ	
Plosive/ Affricate	tenuis	p	t	ts	ʈ	tɕ	k	q	ʔ
Plosive/ Affricate	aspirated	pʰ	tʰ	tsʰ	ʈʰ	tɕʰ	kʰ	qʰ	
Plosive/ Affricate	voiced	b	d	dz	ɖ	dʑ	g	ɢ	
Continuant	voiceless			s		ɕ	x	χ	h
Continuant	voiced			z		ʑ	ɣ	ʁ	ɦ
Approximant	voiceless		l̥						
Approximant	voiced	w	l			j			
Trill	voiceless		r̥						
Trill	voiced		r						

Prenasalisation and preaspiration appear as a preinitial.

	Front	Central	Back	
Close	i	ʉ	ɯ	u
Close-mid	e	ɵ	o	
Mid		ə		
Open-mid	ɛ		ɔ	
Open	a		ɑ	

Suzuki & Nyima (2018) report that each vowel has a creaky and nasalized counterpart.

Syllable structure: ^{c}CGV

Tones are high and rising. The first two syllables of each word act as the tone bearing unit. The second syllable is occasionally out of the tone bearing unit.

== Geographical distribution ==
Drag-yab is spoken in 6 townships, along different river valleys within the Lancang (Lachu) River watershed. These include Maiqu, Kaqu, Lasongqu, Guidaqu, and Changqu.

- Byams mdun Town (Chinese: Xiangdui 香堆镇): mostly Drag-yab speakers
- Dzongsar Township (Chinese: Zongsha 宗沙乡): mostly Drag-yab speakers
- Palri Township (Chinese: Bari 巴日乡): all Drag-yab speakers
- Khuda (Chinese: Kuoda 扩达乡): mostly Drag-yab speakers
- Atshur Township (Chinese: Azi 阿孜乡): mostly Drag-yab speakers
- Rongdrub Township (Chinese: Rongzhou 荣周乡): Drag-yab speakers are mainly located in Maidui Village

Drag-yab villages by township:

Township, County	Villages
Xiangdui Town 香堆镇, Drag-yab	Rezi 热孜村, Kunda 坤达村, Daba 达巴村, Xuelong 学龙村, Laxi 拉西村, and Dangduo 当佐村
Rongzhou Township 荣周乡, Drag-yab	Maidui 麦堆村, Zuotong 佐通村, and Zere
Kuoda Township 扩达乡, Drag-yab	Zeran, Gangba, Gangka 岗卡村, Zuoduo, etc.
Zongsha Township 宗沙乡, Drag-yab	Yuergang, Lasong 拉松村, etc.
Azi Township 阿孜乡, Drag-yab	most villages in the township
Bari Township 巴日乡, Drag-yab	Baie, Luosong 罗松村, Zesong, Zhuoba, Xiongre 雄然村, etc.
