= Larong language =

Sino-Tibetan language

Larong
- Zlarong
- Native to: China
- Region: Zogang County, Chamdo Prefecture, Tibet
- Language family: Sino-Tibetan: (unclassified); Qiangic ?; Chamdo; Larong

Language codes
- ISO 639-3: –
- Glottolog: zlar1234

Larong or Zlarong (autonym: la˥ rɔ˥; Tibetan name: la˥ ruŋ˥) is a recently documented Sino-Tibetan language spoken in Zogang and Markam counties of southeastern Chamdo, Tibet. It was recently documented by Zhao (2018) and Suzuki & Nyima (2018). Zhao (2018) tentatively classifies Zlarong as a Qiangic language.

== Names ==
Larong is referred to by the Changdu Gazetteer (2005) as Rumei 如美话, as it is spoken in Rumei Township 如美乡, Markam County.

Zhao (2018) reports the autonym la˥rɔ˥ and the Tibetan exonym la˥ruŋ˥ for the speakers. Their language is referred to as mə˥kə˥ by speakers, and by Tibetans as ma˧˩ke˥˧ (Zhao 2018).

Nyina & Suzuki (2019) report the autonym m̥a55, which is identical to the Drag-yab autonym also reported by them (m̥a55 ~ ma55).

Jiang (2023) refers to the language as Laronghua (拉茸话).

== Locations ==
- Renguo Township 仁果乡, Mdzo sgang County 左贡县 (Suzuki & Nyima 2018; Zhao 2018), including the village of Phagpa 坝巴村
- Cuowa Township 措瓦乡, Markam County 芒康县
- Rumei Township 如美镇, Markam County 芒康县 (Changdu Gazetteer 2005), including the village of Tangre Chaya 达日村
- Qudeng Township 曲登乡, Markam County 芒康县 (two villages)

Larong villages by township:

| Township, County | Villages |
|---|---|
| Renguo Township 仁果乡, Dzogang | Dongba 东坝村, Deqinggang, Zuoke 左科村, Xindi 新德村, Shalong 沙龙村 (Sano), Paba 坝巴村, Jiaka 加卡村, Languo 兰果村, Woba, etc. |
| Cuowa Township 措瓦乡, Markham | Tongsha 通沙村, Wuba, Zhongri 仲日村, Kuzi 库孜村, Taya 它亚村, Dangreqiaya, etc. |
| Rumei Town 如美镇, Markham | Rumei 如美村, Zhuka 竹卡村, Lawu 拉乌村, and Dari 达日村 |
| Qudeng Township 曲登乡, Markham | Qudeng 曲登村 and Dengba 登巴村 |

A computational phylogenetic analysis by Jiang (2022) shows that Rumei (如美话) to be the most divergent Chamdo, and is not closely related to the Larong dialect (拉茸话) of Zogang County (左贡县).

== Dialects ==
Larong is spoken in four townships in the Larong valley, along the Lancang River (also known as the Zla chu or Lachu River in Tibetan). The four townships are:

- Ringo (Chinese: Renguo)
- Tshonga (Chinese: Cuowa): Larong villages are Tshonga, Rushul, Thosa, Thaya, Drori, and Kuze
- Rongsmad (Chinese: Rumei): Larong speakers in entire town
- Choedan (Chinese: Qudeng): Dempa (Chinese: Dengba) and Choedan village clusters, both Larong-speaking

The dialect spoken in Ringo and Tshonga differs from that of the dialect spoken in Rongsmad and Choedan.

== Classification ==
Suzuki & Nyima (2018) note that Zlarong (Larong) is closely related to two other recently documented Sino-Tibetan languages of Chamdo, eastern Tibet, namely Lamo and Drag-yab (spoken in southern Zhag'yab County).

== Phonology ==
Suzuki & Nyima (2018) report the following phonemes from the Tangre Chaya dialect of Larong.

| | | Labial | Alveolar | | Retroflex | Palatal | Velar | Uvular | Glottal |
| | | Labial | plain | sibilant | Retroflex | Palatal | Velar | Uvular | Glottal |
|---|---|---|---|---|---|---|---|---|---|
| Nasal | voiceless | m̥ | n̥ | | | ȵ̊ | ŋ̊ | ɴ̥ | |
| Nasal | voiced | m | n | | | ȵ | ŋ | ɴ | |
| Plosive/ Affricate | tenuis | p | t | ts | ʈ | tɕ | k | q | ʔ |
| Plosive/ Affricate | aspirated | pʰ | tʰ | tsʰ | ʈʰ | tɕʰ | kʰ | qʰ | |
| Plosive/ Affricate | voiced | b | d | dz | ɖ | dʑ | g | ɢ | |
| Continuant | voiceless | | | s | | ɕ | x | χ | h |
| Continuant | voiced | | | z | | ʑ | ɣ | ʁ | ɦ |
| Approximant | voiceless | | l̥ | | | | | | |
| Approximant | voiced | w | l | | | j | | | |
| Trill | | | r | | | | | | |

Prenasalisation and preaspiration appear as a preinitial.

| | Front | Central | Back | |
|---|---|---|---|---|
| Close | i | ʉ | ɯ | u |
| Close-mid | e | ɵ | o | |
| Mid | | ə | | |
| Open-mid | ɛ | | ɔ | |
| Open | a | | ɑ | |

Suzuki & Nyima (2018) report that each vowel has a creaky and nasalized counterpart.

Syllable structure: ^{c}CGV

Tones are high and rising. The first two syllables of each word act as the tone bearing unit. The second syllable is occasionally out of the tone bearing unit.

== Vocabulary ==
Zhao (2018: 1-3) lists the following Zlarong words.

| Gloss | Zlarong |
|---|---|
| name | mɛ˥ |
| medicine | rɛ˥˧ |
| cloth | rɛ˩˧ |
| ice | ndza˥ |
| you | ȵo˥˧ |
| horse | rɛ˥˧ |
| road | rə˩˧ |
| blood | sɛ˥˧ |
| meat | tɕʰi˩˧ |
| urine | pi˩˧ |
| snow | wi˩˧ |
| water | tɕi˥ |
| smoke | mu˥kʰu˥ |
| wind | ma˧˩mi˥ |
| cloud | ndə˥rə˥ |
| belly | wu˩˧ |
| white | tʂʰɔ̃˧˩tʂʰɔ̃˥˧ |
| black | ȵi˧˩ȵi˥˧ |
| red | nɛ˥nɛ˥˧ |
| yellow | nɛ˥nɛ˥˧ |
| short | wɛ˧˩wɛ˥˧ |
| wide | pʰa˥pʰa˥˧ |
| thick | mbo˧˩mbo˥ |
| fish | ȵɛ˩˧ |
| sand | tɕy˧˩mɛ˥˧ |
| doctor | mɛ̃˥pɛ˥˧ |
| ground | sɛ˥˧ |
| zero | lɛ˥kɔ˥ |
| one | ti˩˧kʰi˥ |
| two | nɛ˧˩ji˥˧ |
| three | sɔ̃˩˧ |
| four | ɣə˩˧ |
| five | ŋa˩˧ |
| six | tɕʰu˩˧ |
| seven | ȵɛ˩˧ |
| eight | ɕɛ˩˧ |
| nine | ŋgo˩˧ |
| ten | a˥kõ˥ |
