= Voiced uvular nasal =

Consonantal sound represented by ⟨ɴ⟩ in IPA

ɴ
- IPA number: 120

Audio sample
- source · help

Encoding
- Entity (decimal): &#628;
- Unicode (hex): U+0274
- X-SAMPA: N\
- Braille: ⠔ (braille pattern dots-35) ⠝ (braille pattern dots-1345)
Image

A voiced uvular nasal is a type of consonantal sound, used in some spoken languages. The symbol in the International Phonetic Alphabet that represents this sound is ⟨ɴ⟩, a small capital version of the Latin letter n.

Uvular nasals are rare sounds cross-linguistically, occurring as a phoneme in only a small handful of languages. It is complex in terms of articulation, and also highly marked, as it is inherently difficult to produce a nasal articulation at the uvular point of contact. This difficulty can be said to account for the marked rarity of this sound among the world's languages.

A uvular nasal most commonly occurs as a conditioned allophone of other sounds, for example as an allophone of /n/ before a uvular plosive as in Quechua, or as an allophone of /q/ before another nasal consonant as in Selkup. However, it has been reported to exist as an independent phoneme in a small number of languages. Examples include the Klallam language, Tagalog language, the Tawellemmet and Ayr varieties of Tuareg Berber, the Rangakha dialect of Khams Tibetan, at least two dialects of the Bai language, the Papuan language Mapos Buang, and the Chamdo languages: Lamo (Kyilwa dialect), Larong sMar (Tangre Chaya dialect), Drag-yab sMar (Razi dialect). In Mapos Buang and in the Bai dialects, it contrasts phonemically with a velar nasal. In the Chamdo languages it contrasts phonemically with /ŋ/, /ŋ̊/, and /ɴ̥/. The syllable-final nasal in Japanese was traditionally said to be realized as a uvular nasal when utterance-final, but empirical studies have disputed this claim.

There is also a pre-uvular nasal in some languages such as Yanyuwa, which is articulated slightly more front compared with the place of articulation of the prototypical uvular nasal, though not as front as the prototypical velar nasal. The International Phonetic Alphabet does not have a separate symbol for that sound, though it can be transcribed as ⟨ɴ̟⟩ (advanced ⟨ɴ⟩), ⟨ŋ̠⟩ or ⟨ŋ˗⟩ (both symbols denote a retracted ⟨ŋ⟩).

== Features ==
Sagittal section of a voiced uvular nasal

Features of a voiced uvular nasal:

- Its manner of articulation is occlusive, which means it is produced by obstructing airflow in the vocal tract. Because the consonant is also nasal, the blocked airflow is redirected through the nose.
- Its place of articulation is uvular, which means it is articulated with the back of the tongue (the dorsum) at the uvula.
- Its phonation is voiced, which means the vocal cords vibrate during the articulation.
- It is a nasal consonant, which means air is exclusively allowed to escape through the nose for nasal stops; otherwise, in addition to through the mouth.
- It is a median consonant, which means it is produced by directing the airstream down the midline of the tongue, rather than to the sides.
- Its airstream mechanism is pulmonic, which means it is articulated by pushing air only with the intercostal muscles and abdominal muscles, as in most speech sounds.

== Occurrence ==
Language		Word	IPA	Meaning	Notes
Afrikaans	Many speakers	aangenaam	[ˈɑːɴχənɑːm]	'pleasant'	Allophone of /n/ before /χ/; realized as [n] in formal speech. See Afrikaans phonology
Arabic	Standard	انقلاب / inqilāb	[ˌɪɴqɪˈlaːb]	'coup'	Allophone of /n/ before /q/; more commonly realized as [n].
Armenian		անխելք / ankhelk´	[ɑɴˈχɛlkʰ]	'brainless'	Allophone of /n/ before a uvular consonant in informal speech.
Bai	Enqi dialect		[ɴa˨˩]	'to walk'	Phonemic, and contrasts with /ŋ/.
Bai	Luobenzhuo dialect	我 / nò	[ɴɔ˦˨]	'I'	Phonemic, and contrasts with /ŋ/.
Bashkir		нaң / ناڭ / nañ	[nɑɴ]	'wilderness'	Allophone of /ŋ/ in back vowel contexts.
Dutch	Netherlandic	aangenaam	[ˈaːɴχəˌnaːm]	'pleasant'	Allophone of /n/ and /ŋ/ before [χ], in dialects that use it. Can be realized as [n] in formal speech.
English	Northumbrian				
Georgian		ზინყი / zinq'i	[ziɴqʼi]	'hip joint'	Allophone of /n/ before uvular consonants.
Iñupiaq	North Slope	iḷisaġniaqtuq	[iʎsaʁɴiaqtuq]	'he will study'	Corresponds to [ʁn] in other dialects.
Inuvialuktun		namunganmun	[namuŋaɴmuɴ]	'to where?'	Allophonic; see Inuit phonology
Kalaallisut		paarngorpoq	[pɑːɴːɔpːɔq]	'crawls'	Occurrence and phonemic status depend on the dialect.
Kazakh		жаңа / جاڭا / jaña	[ʒɑɴɑ]	'new'	Allophone of /ŋ/ in back vowel contexts.
Klallam		sqəyáyŋəxʷ	[sqəˈjajɴəxʷ]	'big tree'	Contrasts with a glottalized form, but not with /ŋ/.
Lamo			[ɴʷɚ̰˥]	'five'	Contrasts with /ŋ/, /ŋ̊/, and /ɴ̥/.
Malto		तेंग़े	[t̪eɴɢe]	'to tell'	/ŋʁ/ is phonetically [ɴɢ]. /ʁ, ŋʁ/ is /h/ in Southern and Western dialects. See Malto language#Phonology.
Mapos Buang		alunġ	[aˈl̪uɴ]	'widower'	Phonemic, and contrasts with /ŋ/.
Mongolian		монгол / ᠮᠣᠩᠭᠣᠯ / mongol	[ˈmɔɴ.ɢəɮ]	'Mongolia'	Allophone of /ŋ/.
Okinawan		ʻnnmee	[ʔɴ̩ːmeː]	'grandmother'	Post-glottal allophone of /n/.
Quechua	Peruvian	sunqu	[ˈs̠oɴqo]	'heart'	Allophone of /n/.
Spanish		enjuto	[ẽ̞ɴˈχuto̞]	'shriveled'	Allophone of /n/. See Spanish phonology
Turkmen		jaň	[dʒɑɴ]	'bell'	Allophone of /ŋ/ next to back vowels.
Yanyuwa		wangulu	[waŋ̠ulu]	'adolescent boy'	Pre-uvular; contrasts with post-palatal [ŋ˖].

== See also ==
- Index of phonetics articles

== Notes ==
Place →	Labial					Coronal										Dorsal					Laryngeal			
Manner ↓	Bilabial		Labiodental		Linguolabial		Dental		Alveolar		Postalveolar		Retroflex		(Alveolo-)palatal		Velar		Uvular		Pharyngeal/epiglottal		Glottal	
Nasal	m̥	m	ɱ̊	ɱ		n̼	n̪̊	n̪	n̥	n	n̠̊	n̠	ɳ̊	ɳ	ɲ̊	ɲ	ŋ̊	ŋ	ɴ̥	ɴ				
Plosive	p	b	p̪	b̪	t̼	d̼	t̪	d̪	t	d			ʈ	ɖ	c	ɟ	k	ɡ	q	ɢ	ʡ		ʔ	
Sibilant affricate							t̪s̪	d̪z̪	ts	dz	t̠ʃ	d̠ʒ	tʂ	dʐ	tɕ	dʑ								
Non-sibilant affricate	pɸ	bβ	p̪f	b̪v			t̪θ	d̪ð	tɹ̝̊	dɹ̝	t̠ɹ̠̊˔	d̠ɹ̠˔			cç	ɟʝ	kx	ɡɣ	qχ	ɢʁ	ʡʜ	ʡʢ	ʔh	
Sibilant fricative							s̪	z̪	s	z	ʃ	ʒ	ʂ	ʐ	ɕ	ʑ								
Non-sibilant fricative	ɸ	β	f	v	θ̼	ð̼	θ	ð	θ̠	ð̠	ɹ̠̊˔	ɹ̠˔	ɻ̊˔	ɻ˔	ç	ʝ	x	ɣ	χ	ʁ	ħ	ʕ	h	ɦ
Approximant		β̞		ʋ				ð̞		ɹ		ɹ̠		ɻ		j		ɰ						˷
Tap/flap		ⱱ̟		ⱱ					ɾ̥	ɾ			ɽ̊	ɽ						ɢ̆		ʡ̆		
Trill	ʙ̥	ʙ							r̥	r		r̠	ɽ̊r̥	ɽr					ʀ̥	ʀ	ʜ	ʢ		
Lateral affricate									tɬ	dɮ			tꞎ	d𝼅	c𝼆	ɟʎ̝	k𝼄	ɡʟ̝						
Lateral fricative							ɬ̪		ɬ	ɮ			ꞎ	𝼅	𝼆	ʎ̝	𝼄	ʟ̝						
Lateral approximant								l̪	l̥	l		l̠	ɭ̊	ɭ	ʎ̥	ʎ	ʟ̥	ʟ		ʟ̠				
Lateral tap/flap									ɺ̥	ɺ			𝼈̊	𝼈		ʎ̆		ʟ̆						

		BL	LD	D	A	PA	RF	P	V	U
Implosive	Voiced	ɓ			ɗ		ᶑ	ʄ	ɠ	ʛ
Implosive	Voiceless	ɓ̥			ɗ̥		ᶑ̊	ʄ̊	ɠ̊	ʛ̥
Ejective	Stop	pʼ			tʼ		ʈʼ	cʼ	kʼ	qʼ
Ejective	Affricate		p̪fʼ	tθʼ	tsʼ	tʃʼ	tʂʼ	tɕʼ	kxʼ	qχʼ
Ejective	Fricative	ɸʼ	fʼ	θʼ	sʼ	ʃʼ	ʂʼ	ɕʼ	xʼ	χʼ
Ejective	Lateral affricate				tɬʼ			c𝼆ʼ	k𝼄ʼ	q𝼄ʼ
Ejective	Lateral fricative				ɬʼ					
Click (top: velar; bottom: uvular)	Tenuis	kʘ qʘ		kǀ qǀ	kǃ qǃ		k𝼊 q𝼊	kǂ qǂ		
Click (top: velar; bottom: uvular)	Voiced	ɡʘ ɢʘ		ɡǀ ɢǀ	ɡǃ ɢǃ		ɡ𝼊 ɢ𝼊	ɡǂ ɢǂ		
Click (top: velar; bottom: uvular)	Nasal	ŋʘ ɴʘ		ŋǀ ɴǀ	ŋǃ ɴǃ		ŋ𝼊 ɴ𝼊	ŋǂ ɴǂ	ʞ	
Click (top: velar; bottom: uvular)	Tenuis lateral				kǁ qǁ					
Click (top: velar; bottom: uvular)	Voiced lateral				ɡǁ ɢǁ					
Click (top: velar; bottom: uvular)	Nasal lateral				ŋǁ ɴǁ					
