= Chamdo languages =

Group of Sino-Tibetan languages

Chamdo
- Chamdoic
- Geographic distribution: Chamdo Prefecture, Tibet
- Linguistic classification: Sino-Tibetan: (unclassified); Qiangic? rGyalrongic?; Chamdo
- Subdivisions: Lamo; Larong; Drag-yab

Language codes
- Glottolog: cham1336

The Chamdo languages are a group of recently discovered, closely related Sino-Tibetan languages spoken in Chamdo Prefecture, Tibet. Their position within the Sino-Tibetan language family is currently uncertain.

== Languages ==
The Chamdo languages are:

- Lamo, gSerkhu
- Larong, cZerkhu
- Drag-yab

== Classification ==
Jiang (2022) provides the following computational phylogenetic classification of the Chamdo languages.

- Chamdo
  - Rumei 如美话 (Markam County 芒康县)
  - - gSerkhu/Suku 素苦话 (Zayu County 察隅县)
    - - Lamo/Dongba 东坝话 (Zogang County 左贡县)
      - - Larong 拉茸话 (Zogang County 左贡县)
        - Drag-yab cluster: Mang 芒话 and Maji 玛吉话 (Zhag'yab County 察雅县)

== Lexical comparison ==
=== Nyima & Suzuki (2019) ===
Lexical comparisons of numerals in four Chamdo languages from Nyima & Suzuki (2019):

Gloss	Larong	Drag-yab	gSerkhu	Lamo
one	ˊte khɯ	ˊtɛ	ˊtɕɛ	ˉdə
two	ˊne	ˊne	ˊna	ˉna
three	ˊsɔ̃	ˊsɔ̃	ˊsɔ̃	ˉsɔ̰̃
four	ˊɣə	ˉʑe	ˊli	ˉlə̰
five	ˉŋa	ˊŋɑ	ˊɴɑ	ˉɴwə̰˞
six	ˊtɕhu	ˉntɕho	ˊtɕhu	ˊtɕi
seven	ˊn̥i	ˉȵ̊e	ˊȵ̊ɛ	ˉn̥i
eight	ˊɕe	ˉɕe	ˊɕɛ	ˉɦdʑə
nine	ˊɦgɯ	ˉɴɢo	ˊku	ˉŋgo
ten	ˉʔa qõ	ˊɦa̰ qo	ˉχɑ	
eleven	ˉʔa’ tə	ˊɦa̰ tɛ	ˉhtɕo htɕiʔ	
twelve	ˉʔa’ ne	ˊɦa̰ ne	ˉhtɕo ɦȵi	
thirteen	ˉʔɔ’ sɔ̃	ˊɦa̰ sɔ̃	ˉhtɕu hsɔ̃	
fourteen	ˉʔɔ’ ɣə	ˊɦa̰ ʑe	ˉhtɕʉ ɦʑə	
fifteen	ˉʔɑ’ ɴɑ	ˊɦa̰ ɴɑ̰	ˉhtɕɛ ɦŋa	
sixteen	ˉʔo’ tɕhu	ˊɦa̰ntɕho	ˉhtɕu ʈuʔ	
seventeen	ˉʔɔ’ ȵ̊e	ˊɦa̰ȵ̊e	ˉhtɕu ɦdʉ̃	
eighteen	ˉʔɔ’ ɕɛ	ˊɦa̰ ɕe	ˉhtɕu ɦdʑɛʔ	
nineteen	ˉʔɛ’ ɴɢə	ˊɦa̰ɴɢo	ˉhtɕu ɦgu	
twenty	ˉnɑ	ˊnɑ	ˊȵi ɕu	

=== Suzuki & Nyima (2018) ===
Suzuki & Nyima (2018: 4-6) provide the following lexical items for Lamo, Larong, and Drag-yab.

The lexical data below is based on the following dialects.

- Kyilwa 格瓦 dialect of Lamo
- Tangre Chaya 达日 (sMarkhams) and Phagpa 坝巴 (mDzogang) dialects of Larong
- Razi 热孜 dialect of Drag-yab

Cognates

no.	gloss	Lamo	Larong	Drag-yab
1	bitter	qa˥ qʰɛ˥	n̥tsʰə˥	tsʰə˥
2	cry	qo˧˥	qo̰˧˥	qə˧˥
3	earth	ndzɔ̰˧˥	ndzɑ˧˥	ndza˧˥
4	eat	ndzə˥	ndzə˥	ndzə˥
5	house	tɕi˥	tɕo˥	tɕẽ˧˥
6	blood	se˥	se˥	sɛ˥
7	needle	ʁɑ˧˥	ʁɑ˧˥	ʁɑ˧˥
8	cow	ŋʉ˧˥	ŋʉ˧˥	ŋu˧˥
9	wait	ɦlḭ˥	ɦle˥	ɦli˥
10	horse	re˧˥	re˥	re˧˥
11	salt	tsʰo˥	n̥tsʰə˥	tsʰə˥
12	six	tɕi˧˥	tɕʰu˧˥	tɕʰu˥
13	meat	tɕʰi˧˥	ɲtɕʰi˥	ɲ̥tɕʰə˧˥
14	you	nə˥	ɲe˥	ɲa˥
15	seven	n̥i˥	n̥i˧˥	ɲ̥e˥
16	hand	lu˧˥	ndi˥	nde˧˥
17	butter	jwɚ̰˥	wa˥	we˧˥
18	head	wɔ̰˥	wɔ̰˥	ʁo̰˧˥
19	eye	məʔ˥ do˧	ɦɲi˥	ɲə˥
20	nose	n̥ʉ˥	ɲ̥u˥	n̥a˥ rə˧
21	tongue	ʰl̥ə˥	ndə̰˥	mda˧˥
22	tooth	xʉ˧˥	ʰl̥i˧˥	xɯ˧˥
23	milk	χɔ̰˧˥	ʰl̥ɔ̰˥	χl̥ɔ̰˧
24	moon	le˥	ɦli˥	ɦla̰˧ jḭ˧

Non-cognates

no.	gloss	Lamo	Larong	Drag-yab
25	mouth	ɲ̥tɕʰu˥ to˧ (< Tibetan)	mu˧˥	ɕi˧˥
26	foot	siʔ˥ ka˧	ŋɡɯ˧˥	pʰə˥ ndɯ˧
27	liver	se˥	je˥	ɲ̥tɕʰĩ˥ mbi˧ (< Tibetan)
28	laugh	ɦɡɛ (< Tibetan)	n̥tsʰə˧˥	ʁə˥
29	sleep	nə˥ ɦgɯ˧	jṵ˧˥	nə˧˥ mḛ˧
30	child	no˥ no˧	n̥tʰe˥	ɲa˧˥
31	take	le˧˥	ɣi˧˥	tɕʰõ˥
32	search	xɯ˥	ɦzɔ̃˥	ɲə˧˥ ŋo˧
33	forget	nɛ˧˥ tʰa˥	ɦmɛ˥	ɣə˧˥ ɦmu˧ se˧
34	sky	ɦnɑ˥ (< Tibetan)	ŋo˥	mo˧˥
35	sun	nə˥	ɲi˧˥	ɲi˧˥ me˧ (< Tibetan)
36	red	ɦmaʔ ɦma˧ (< Tibetan)	nḛ˥ nḛ˧	ndja̰˥
37	body hair	ʰpu˥ (< Tibetan)	mɔ˧˥	mo̰˧˥
38	urine	qo˥	pi˧˥	bi˧˥
39	look	ʈu˥	ŋi˧˥	tʰa˧˥ ŋɛ̃˧
40	person	mə˧˥	ŋʉ˥ nɛ̰˧	ɦŋɯʔ˥ ɲi˧
41	male	no˥	zə˧˥	zə˧˥
42	daughter	nu˧˥ mo˧	m̥e˧˥	m̥ə˧˥
43	road	tɕə˥	rɛ˥	ra˧˥
44	fear	ɦlɛ˥	ɦɣe˥	ɣe˧˥
45	be born	no˥ mbə˧	ndzə˧˥	ndzɑ˧˥
46	go	xɯ˥	n̥tʰõ˥	n̥tʰɛ̃˥
47	shout	kəʔ˥ ɕi˧	rɛ˥	rḛ˧˥
48	four	lə̰˥	ɦɣə˧˥ (< Tibetan)	ɦɣe˧˥ (< Tibetan)
49	eight	ɦdʑə˥ (< Tibetan)	ɕe˧˥	ɕa˥
50	ten	ʁɑ˧˥	ʔa˥ qõ˧	ɦa̰˧˥ ʁõ˧
51	twenty	ɲe˧˥ qɑ˧	nɑ˧˥	nɑ˧˥
52	be sick	ŋo˥	nø̰˧˥	nɛ˧˥ ŋa˧
53	rain	mo˧˥	tsu˥	mo˧˥
54	wear	to˧˥ ŋɡʉ˧	ŋɡu˥	qe˧˥
55	wind	mɛ̰˥	ŋɑ˧˥ mi˧	ɦdʑa˧˥ ɦɡə˧ rə˧
56	wipe	nə˥ ɕə˧	ɕḛ̃˥	xɔ̰˧˥

=== Changdu Gazetteer (2005) ===
The Changdu Gazetteer (2005: 819) provides the following comparative data in Tibetan script. The table below uses Wylie romanization. English translations for the Chinese glosses are also provided.

English gloss	Chinese gloss	Lhasa Tibetan	Khams Tibetan (Chamdo)	Lamo (Dongba 东坝话)	Larong (Rumei 如美话)	Drag-yab (Zesong 则松话)
house	房子	ཁང་པ (khang pa)	ཁོང་པ (khong pa)	ཅིས (cis)	ཅོང (cong)	ཅིམ (cim)
chhaang (Tibetan alcohol)	青稞酒	ཆང (chang)	ཆོང (chong)	ཨོས (os)	ཆང (chang)	དགེས (dges)
hand	手	ལག་པ (lag pa)	ལག་པ (lag pa)	ལུའུ (lu'u)	འདིས ('dis)	འདིས ('dis)
ride horse	骑马	རྟ་བཞོན (rta bzhon)	རྟ་ཀྱ (rta kya)	རིས་གྱིས (ris gyis)	རེ་གག (re gag)	རེའུ་ན་ཚེམ (re'u na tshem)
hat	帽子	ཞྭ་མོ (zhwa mo)	ཞ་མགོ (zha mgo)	ཇའ (ja'a)	དེའུ (de'u)	དེའུ (de'u)
eat rice	吃饭	ཁ་ལག་ཟས (kha lag zas)	ཟ་མ་ཟ (za ma za)	ཆོག་ཅོག་ཏོས (chog cog tos)	གཟིས་མའི་མཛད (gzis ma'i mdzad)	གཟིན་ཐོ་འམ (gzin tho 'am)
sheep	绵羊	ལུག (lug)	ལུག (lug)	ཡིས (yis)	ལའ (la'a)	ལྭའུ (lwa'u)
beautiful	漂亮	སྙིང་རྗེ་མོ (snying rje mo)	གཅེས་ལི་མ (gces li ma)	ཀ་ཞིས་ཉིས (ka zhis nyis)	དངེས་ཡིས (dnges yis)	དངུད་ལུ (dngud lu)
donkey	毛驴	བོང་བུ (bong bu)	ཀུ་རུ (ku ru)	བ་ཅི (ba ci)	ཅོའུ (co'u)	གུའུའུ (gu'u'u)
salt	盐	ཚྭ (tshwa)	ཚྭ (tshwa)	ཚོག་ཏི (tshog ti)	ཚེའུ (tshe'u)	ཚྭའུ (tshwa'u)
swell	肿	སྐྲངས་པ (skrangs pa)	སྐྲོང་པ (skrong pa)	སྐྲེ་བེ (skre be)	དུ་རགས (du rags)	དུའུ་རམས (du'u rams)
head	头	མགོ (mgo)	མགོ (mgo)	དབུ (dbu)	དབོག (dbog)	གཞོག (gzhog)
child	小孩	སྤུ་གུ (spu gu)	ཉོག (nyog)	ཉོག་ཉོག (nyog nyog)	ཐད (thad)	ཆ་ཆོག (cha chog)
dry beef	干牛肉	ཤ་སྐམ (sha skam)	ཤ་སྐམ (sha skam)	བྱིས་རོ (byis ro)	ཆེས་རོང་རོང (ches rong rong)	ཆོའུ་རིམ་རིམ (cho'u rim rim)
What is this?	这是什么	དེ་ག་རེ་རེད (de ga re red)	འདི་ཆི་རེད་ལས ('di chi red las)	ཏེ་ཧ་ཆོས (te ha chos)	ཨེ་ཏི་ཐོའུ (e ti tho'u)	ཙེ་དུ་ཁྱི (tse du khyi)
Where are you going?	你去哪里	རང་ག་བ་འགྲོ་ག (rang ga ba 'gro ga)	ཁྱོད་ག་ན་འགྲོ་ཇི (khyod ga na 'gro ji)	ནི་རི་ཧི་ལོ་ཤས (ni ri hi lo shas)	གནད་མདོ་ཧུ་ནུ་ངོག (gnad mdo hu nu ngog)	འདེ་རུ་ཧེན ('de ru hen)
crazy person	疯子	སྨྱོན་པ (smyon pa)	མྱོན་པ (myon pa)	འ་རོ ('a ro)	སྨྱོན་འབས (smyon 'bas)	ཡ་རོག (ya rog)
crow (bird)	乌鸦	པུ་རོག (pu rog)	ཁ་ཏ (kha ta)	ཕོ་རོག (pho rog)	ཁ་གཏེ (kha gte)	ཕུའུ་རོག (phu'u rog)
Thank you.	谢谢	ཐུགས་རྗེ་ཆེ (thugs rje che)	ཡག་བྲུང (yag brung)	བྱུ་ནུ་པུ་ང་ཉིད་གུ་ནི་ད (byu nu pu nga nyid gu ni da)	དེ་སྒྲ་དགེ (de sgra dge)	ཏི་སྒྲ་དགེ (ti sgra dge)
