= Mapos Buang language =

Oceanic language spoken in Papua New Guinea

Mapos
- Central Buang
- Native to: Papua New Guinea
- Region: Morobe Province
- Native speakers: (7,000 cited 2001); 1,400 monolinguals (2001)
- Language family: Austronesian: Malayo-Polynesian; Oceanic; Western Oceanic; North New Guinea ?; Ngero–Vitiaz ?; Huon Gulf; South Huon Gulf; Hote–Buang; Buang; Mapos

Language codes
- ISO 639-3: bzh
- Glottolog: mapo1242

Mapos Buang, also known as Mapos or Central Buang, is an Oceanic language in Morobe Province, Papua New Guinea.

== Phonology ==
Mapos Buang has a larger sound inventory than is typical of most Austronesian languages. Notable is the existence of a phonemic contrast between a velar nasal and a uvular nasal, which is extremely rare among the world's languages. Along with this, its phonology is unusually symmetrical compared to most other languages.

=== Vowels ===
| | Front | Central | Back |
|---|---|---|---|
| High | i(ː) | | u(ː) |
| Mid | e(ː) ⟨ë⟩ | ə* ⟨e⟩ | o(ː) |
| Low | ɛ(ː) ⟨e⟩ | a(ː) | ɔ(ː) ⟨ö⟩ |

* [ə] is a prominent feature of Buang phonology, but is not contrastive. Thus both it and [e] are represented with ⟨e⟩.

Vowel length is shown in the orthography by doubling the letter.

=== Consonants ===
| | Bilabial | Coronal | Post-alv./ Palatal | Velar | Labio- velar | Uvular |
|---|---|---|---|---|---|---|
| Nasal | m | n | ɲ ⟨ny⟩ | ŋ ⟨ng⟩ | ŋʷ ⟨ngw⟩ | ɴ ⟨nġ⟩ |
| (prenasalized) Occlusive | ᵐb ⟨b⟩ | ⁿd ⟨d⟩ | ⁿdʒ ⟨j⟩ | ᵑɡ ⟨g⟩ | ᵑɡʷ ⟨gw⟩ | ᶰɢ ⟨ġ⟩ |
| (prenasalized) Occlusive | p | t | tʃ ⟨s⟩ | k | kʷ ⟨kw⟩ | q ⟨ḳ⟩ |
| Fricative | β ⟨v⟩ | | | ɣ ⟨gg⟩ | | ʁ ⟨h⟩ |
| Approximant | β̞ ⟨w⟩ | l̪ ⟨l⟩ | j ⟨y⟩ | | | |
| Liquid | | l~ɽ | | | | |

Orthography is the same as in the IPA when nothing is shown.
