= Coka, Tibet =

Coka 草卡镇
- Town
- Location within Tibet Autonomous Region
- Coordinates: 30°54′11″N 94°40′16″E
- Country: China
- Region: Tibet Autonomous Region
- Prefecture: Chamdo
- County: Banbar

Area
  - Total: 451 km^{2} (174 sq mi)
- Elevation: 3,734 m (12,251 ft)
- 4000
- Time zone: UTC+8 (China Standard)

Coka (Chinese: 草卡; pinyin: Cǎokǎ; Standard Tibetan: མཚོ་ཁ།) is a town in Banbar County, Chamdo Prefecture, in the east of the Tibet Autonomous Region, China. It lies just 5 km (3.1 mi) to the southwest of Banbar, and is serviced by Tibet Regional Highway 303 (S303). The administrative division covers an area of 451 km^{2} (174 sq mi), and as of 2004 had a population of 4,000.

== Administrative divisions ==
The township contains the following village-level divisions:

- Dongtuo Community (东托社区)
- Geji Village (格吉村)
- Wangka Village (旺卡村)
- Suocun Village (索村)
- Laiyi Village (来义村)
- Latuo Village (拉托村)
- Cangba Village (藏巴村)
- Zhuogui Village (卓归村)
- Changsha Village (昌沙村)
- Maijia Village (麦加村)
- Dagen Village (达根村)
- Lagong Village (拉贡村)
- Danda Village (丹达村)
- Sudong Village (苏东村)
