= Korra, Tibet =

Coordinates: 30°52′N 97°50′E

Korra
- Village
- Interactive map of Korra
- Country: China
- Autonomous region: Tibet
- Prefecture: Chamdo
- County: Zhag'yab

Korra is a village in Zhag'yab County, of the Chamdo Prefecture in the northeastern Tibet Autonomous Region of China. Korra in Tibetan refers to the act of circumambulation.
