= Xiangdui Town =

Xiangdui Town 香堆 (Xiangdui) བྱངས་མདུན (byangs mdun)
- Town
- Location in Tibet
- Coordinates: 30°35′N 97°58′E
- Country: China
- Province-level autonomous region: Tibet Autonomous Region
- Prefecture: Chamdo
- County: Zhag'yab

Population
  - Total: 8,000

Xiangdui Town, known in Tibetan as Qamdün, (Standard Tibetan: བྱངས་མདུན', byangs mdun; Chinese: 香堆镇; pinyin: Xiāngduī zhèn; lit. 'Incense Heap Town') is a town of about 8,000 people in the Zhag'yab County of the Chamdo Prefecture in the Tibet Autonomous Region of China. It is home to a Gelug monastery as well as to a specific "blue mask" variety of Tibetan Opera. The Renda Cliff archaeological site is situated in the vicinity of Wangbu village (旺布村) about 12 km (7.5 mi) north of Qamdün.

== See also ==
- List of towns and villages in Tibet
