= KBG =

KBG or kbg may refer to:

- KBG syndrome, a rare genetic disease that is the result of a mutation in the ANKRD11 gene
- KBG, the station code for Kongsberg Station, Buskerud, Norway
- kbg, the ISO 639-3 code for Khamba language, an endangered language in Arunachal Pradesh, India
