= Awang goat =

Species of goat from Tibet

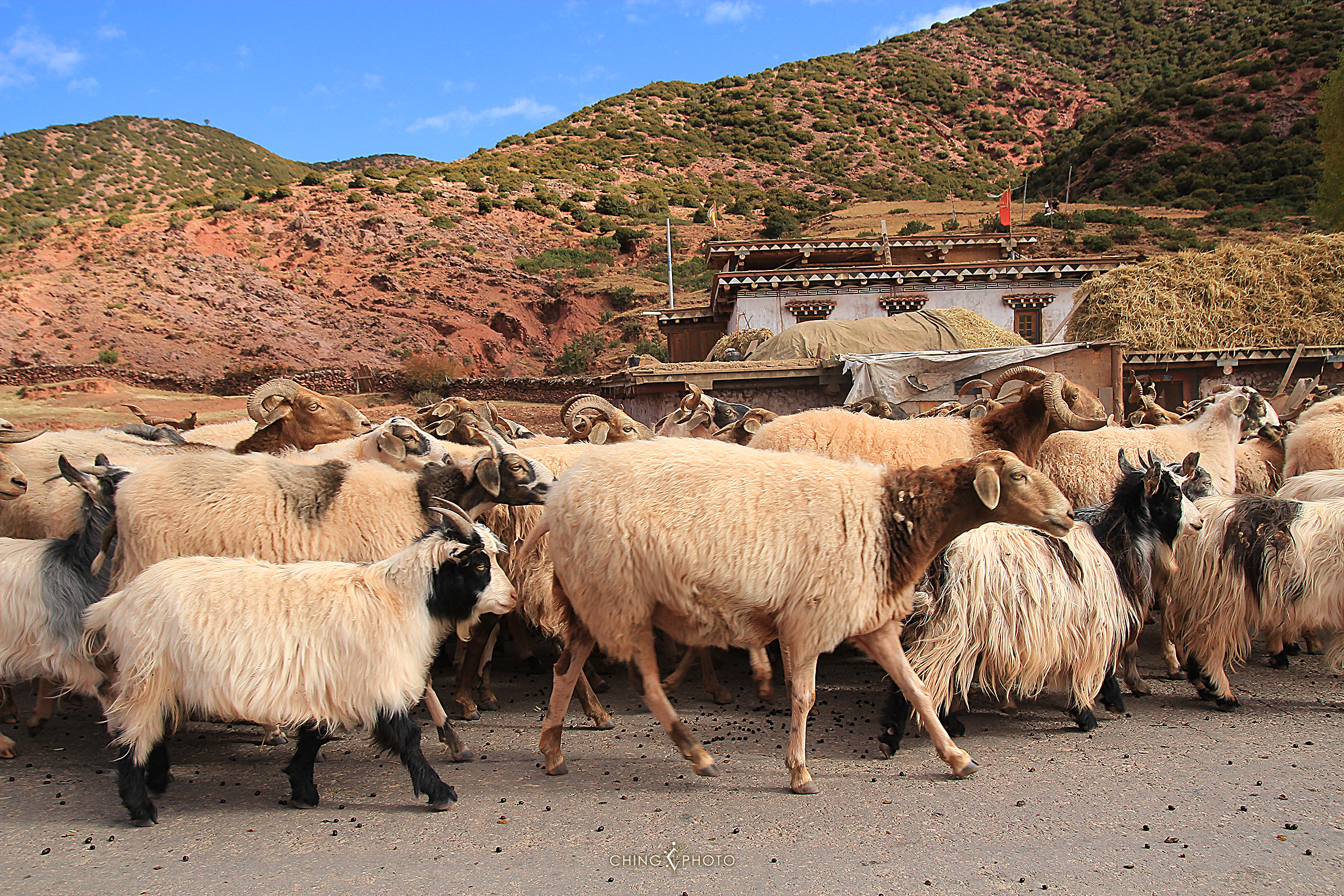
Awang goats in Tibet

The Awang goat (Chinese: 昌都阿旺绵羊, 阿旺绵羊) is a distinctive livestock species in Chamdo, Tibet, representing a domesticated variety of the purebred plateau wild brown goat, dating back 2,000 years.

== Feature ==
Following an extended period of closed breeding, traditional natural selection, and selective breeding, Awang goat, characterized by superior skin, soft meat, distinctive flavor, and absence of odor, have gained widespread popularity both regionally and internationally. Changdu Awan goat graze in a snowy plateau characterized by low oxygen levels, at an elevation of over 4000 meters, in a natural and pollution-free environment. Its meat is abundant in amino acids and has a low cholesterol level, featuring a protein content of 21.96%, which is 2-3% greater than that of conventional goat, categorizing it as a high-protein diet.

In 2020, Tianjin allocated 55 million yuan to facilitate a collaborative initiative with Chamdo to establish an embryo center for Awang goat. In October 2021, the Awang goat was included in the national inventory of livestock and poultry genetic resources (Chinese: 国家畜禽遗传资源名录). In 2023, Chamdo Awang goat obtained the national geographical indication and ISO quality system certification.
