= Larong =

Larong may refer to:

- Ardy Larong (born 1980), Filipino basketball player
- Larong language, spoken in Tibet
