= Draya =

Draya may refer to

- Draya Michele, American actress and fashion designer (born 1985)
- Zhag'yab, a town and seat of a county in eastern Tibet
