= Bianba =

Bianba or Banbar may refer to:

- Banbar County, or Bianba County, county in Tibet
- Banbar Town, or Bianba Town, town in Banbar County, Tibet
- Benpa Township, or Bianba Township, township in Lhozhag County, Tibet
