= Nasal consonant =

Type of occlusive consonant

In phonetics, a nasal, also called a nasal occlusive or nasal stop in contrast with an oral stop or nasalized consonant, is an occlusive consonant produced with a lowered velum, allowing air to escape freely through the nose. The vast majority of consonants are oral consonants. Examples of nasals in English are [n] as in nose, [ŋ] as in bring, and [m] as in mouth.

Nasal occlusives are nearly universal in human languages. There are also other kinds of nasal consonants in some languages.

== Definition ==
Nearly all nasal consonants are nasal occlusives, in which air escapes through the nose but not through the mouth, as it is blocked (occluded) by the lips or tongue. The oral cavity still acts as a resonance chamber for the sound. Rarely, non-occlusive consonants may be nasalized.

Most nasals are voiced, and in fact, the nasal sounds [n] and [m] are among the most common sounds cross-linguistically. Voiceless nasals occur in a few languages such as Burmese, Welsh, Icelandic and Guaraní. (Compare oral stops, which block off the air completely, and fricatives, which obstruct the air with a narrow channel. Both stops and fricatives are more commonly voiceless than voiced, and are known as obstruents.)

In terms of acoustics, nasals are sonorants, which means that they do not significantly restrict the escape of air (as it can freely escape out the nose). However, nasals are also obstruents in their articulation because the flow of air through the mouth is blocked. This duality, a sonorant airflow through the nose along with an obstruction in the mouth, means that nasal occlusives behave both like sonorants and like obstruents. For example, nasals tend to pattern with other sonorants such as [r] and [l], but in many languages, they may develop from or into stops.

Acoustically, nasals have bands of energy at around 200 and 2,000 Hz.

	Voiceless	Voiced
Bilabial	m̥	m
Labiodental	ɱ̊	ɱ
Linguolabial	n̼̊	n̼
Dental	n̪̊	n̪
Alveolar	n̥^{1}	n^{1}
Retroflex	ɳ̊	ɳ
Palatal	ɲ̊	ɲ
Velar	ŋ̊	ŋ
Uvular	ɴ̥	ɴ
Labial–alveolar	n̥͡m̥	n͡m
Labial–retroflex	ɳ̥͡m̥	ɳ͡m
Labial–velar	ŋ̥͡m̥	ŋ͡m

1. The symbol ⟨n⟩ is commonly used to represent the dental nasal as well, rather than ⟨n̪⟩, as it is rarely distinguished from the alveolar nasal.

Examples of languages containing nasal occlusives:

The voiced retroflex nasal [ɳ] is a common sound in the languages of South Asia and Australian Aboriginal languages.

The voiced palatal nasal [ɲ] is a common sound in European languages, such as: Spanish ⟨ñ⟩, French and Italian ⟨gn⟩, Catalan and Hungarian ⟨ny⟩, Czech and Slovak ⟨ň⟩, Polish ⟨ń⟩, Occitan and Portuguese ⟨nh⟩, and (before a vowel) Modern Greek ⟨νι⟩.

Many Germanic languages, including German, Dutch, English and Swedish, as well as varieties of Chinese such as Mandarin and Cantonese, have /m/, /n/ and /ŋ/. Malayalam has a six-fold distinction between /m, n̪, n, ɳ, ɲ, ŋ/ ⟨മ, ന, ഩ, ണ, ഞ, ങ⟩; some speakers also have a /ŋʲ/.

The Nuosu language also contrasts six categories of nasals, /m, n, m̥, n̥, ɲ, ŋ/. They are represented in romanisation by <m, n, hm, hn, ny, ng>. Nuosu also contrasts prenasalised stops and affricates with their voiced, unvoiced, and aspirated versions.

/ɱ/ is the rarest voiced nasal to be phonemic, as it is mostly an allophone of other nasals before labiodentals. Currently, there is only one reported language, Kukuya, which distinguishes /m, ɱ, n, ɲ, ŋ/ and also a set of prenasalized consonants like /ᶬp̪fʰ, ᶬb̪v/. Yuanmen used to have it phonemically before merging it with /m/.

Catalan, Occitan, Spanish, and Italian have /m, n, ɲ/ as phonemes, and [ɱ, ŋ] as allophones. It may also be claimed that Catalan has phonemic /ŋ/, at least on the basis of Central Catalan forms such as sang [saŋ], although the only minimal pairs involve foreign proper nouns. Also, among many younger speakers of Rioplatense Spanish, the palatal nasal has been lost, replaced by a cluster [nj], as in English canyon.

In Brazilian Portuguese and Angolan Portuguese /ɲ/, written ⟨nh⟩, is typically pronounced as [ȷ̃], a nasal palatal approximant, a nasal glide (in Polish, this feature is also possible as an allophone). Semivowels in Portuguese often nasalize before and always after nasal vowels, resulting in [ȷ̃] and [w̃]. What would be coda nasal occlusives in other West Iberian languages is only slightly pronounced before dental consonants. Outside this environment the nasality is spread over the vowel or become a nasal diphthong (mambembe [mɐ̃ˈbẽjbi], outside the final, only in Brazil, and mantém [mɐ̃ˈtẽj ~ mɐ̃ˈtɐ̃j] in all Portuguese dialects).

The Japanese syllabary kana ん, typically romanized as n and occasionally m, can manifest as one of several different nasal consonants depending on what consonant follows it; this allophone, colloquially written in IPA as /N/, is known as the moraic nasal, per the language's moraic structure.

Welsh has a set of voiceless nasals, /m̥, n̥, ŋ̊/, which occur predominantly as a result of nasal mutation of their voiced counterparts (/m, n, ŋ/).

The Mapos Buang language of New Guinea has a phonemic uvular nasal, /ɴ/, which contrasts with a velar nasal. It is extremely rare for a language to have /ɴ/ as a phoneme. The /ŋ, ɴ/ distinction also occurs in a few Inuit languages like Iñupiaq. Chamdo languages like Lamo (Kyilwa dialect), Larong sMar (Tangre Chaya dialect), Drag-yab sMar (Razi dialect) have an extreme distinction of /m̥ n̥ ȵ̊ ŋ̊ ɴ̥ m n ȵ ŋ ɴ/, also one of the few languages to have a [ɴ̥].

Yanyuwa is highly unusual in that it has a seven-way distinction between /m, n̪, n, ɳ, ṉ/ (palato-alveolar), /ŋ̟/ (front velar), and /ŋ̠/ (back velar). This may be the only language in existence that contrasts nasals at seven distinct points of articulation.

Yélî Dnye also has an extreme contrast of /m, mʷ, mʲ, mʷʲ, n̪, n̪͡m, n̠, n̠͡m, n̠ʲ, ŋ, ŋʷ, ŋʲ, ŋ͡m/.

The term 'nasal occlusive' (or 'nasal stop') is generally abbreviated to nasal. However, there are also nasalized fricatives, nasalized flaps, nasal glides, and nasal vowels, as in French, Portuguese, and Polish. In the IPA, nasal vowels and nasalized consonants are indicated by placing a tilde (~) over the vowel or consonant in question: French sang [sɑ̃], Portuguese bom [bõ], Polish wąż [vɔ̃w̃ʂ].

== Voiceless nasals ==
A few languages have phonemic voiceless nasal occlusives. Among them are Icelandic, Faroese, Burmese, Jalapa Mazatec, Kildin Sami, Welsh, and Central Alaskan Yup'ik. Iaai of New Caledonia has an unusually large number of them, with /m̥ m̥ʷ n̪̊ ɳ̊ ɲ̊ ŋ̊/, along with a number of voiceless approximants.

== Other kinds of nasal consonant ==
Ladefoged and Maddieson (1996) distinguish purely nasal consonants, the nasal occlusives such as m n ng in which the airflow is purely nasal, from partial nasal consonants such as prenasalized consonants and nasal pre-stopped consonants, which are nasal for only part of their duration, as well as from nasalized consonants, which have simultaneous oral and nasal airflow. In some languages, such as Portuguese, a nasal consonant may have occlusive and non-occlusive allophones. In general, therefore, nasal consonants may be:

- nasal occlusives, such as English m, n, ng
- nasal approximants, as in some realizations of the Japanese moraic nasal such as [ɴ̞], and nasalized approximants, as in nh, ão [j̃, w̃] in some Portuguese dialects and ą, ę in Polish
- prenasalized consonants, pre-stopped nasals and post-stopped nasals, as in Arrernte
- nasal clicks such as Zulu nq, nx, nc
- other nasalized consonants, such as nasalized fricatives

A nasal trill [r̃] has been described from some dialects of Romanian, and is posited as an intermediate historical step in rhotacism. However, the phonetic variation of the sound is considerable, and it is not clear how frequently it is actually trilled. Some languages contrast /r, r̃/ like Toro-tegu Dogon (contrasts /w, r, j, w̃, r̃, j̃/) and Inor. A nasal lateral has been reported for some languages, Nzema contrasts /l, l̃/, Nemi contrasts /w, w̥, h, w̃, w̥̃, h̃/. Ganza contrasts /ʔ, ʔ̃/.

== Languages without nasals ==
A few languages, perhaps 2%, contain no phonemically distinctive nasals. This led Ferguson (1963) to assume that all languages have at least one primary nasal occlusive. However, there are exceptions.

=== Lack of phonemic nasals ===
When a language is claimed to lack nasals altogether, as with several Niger–Congo languages (Note: These languages lie in a band from western Liberia to southeastern Nigeria, and north to southern Burkina Faso. They include: Liberia: Kpelle (Mande); Grebo, Klao (Kru); Burkina Faso: Bwamu (Gur); Ivory Coast: Dan, Guro-Yaoure, Wan-Mwan, Gban/Gagu, Tura (Mande); Senadi/Senufo (Gur); Nyabwa, Wè (Kru); Ebrié, Avikam, Abure (Kwa); Ghana: Abron, Akan, Ewe (Kwa); Benin: Gen, Fon (Kwa); Nigeria: Mbaise Igbo, Ikwere (Igboid); CAR: Yakoma (Ubangi); (Heine & Nurse, eds, 2008, A Linguistic Geography of Africa, p.46)) or the Pirahã language of the Amazon, nasal and non-nasal or prenasalized consonants usually alternate allophonically, and it is a theoretical claim on the part of the individual linguist that the nasal is not the basic form of the consonant. In the case of some Niger–Congo languages, for example, nasals occur before only nasal vowels. Since nasal vowels are phonemic, it simplifies the picture somewhat to assume that nasalization in occlusives is allophonic. There is then a second step in claiming that nasal vowels nasalize oral occlusives, rather than oral vowels denasalizing nasal occlusives, that is, whether [mã, mba] are phonemically /mbã, mba/ without full nasals, or /mã, ma/ without prenasalized stops. Postulating underlying oral or prenasalized stops rather than true nasals helps to explain the apparent instability of nasal correspondences throughout Niger–Congo compared with, for example, Indo-European. Proto-Mande has also been reconstructed with a system in which nasals are allophones of oral stops and approximants.

This analysis comes at the expense, in some languages, of postulating either a single nasal consonant that can only be syllabic, or a larger set of nasal vowels than oral vowels, both typologically odd situations. The way such a situation could develop is illustrated by a Jukunoid language, Wukari. Wukari allows oral vowels in syllables like ba, mba and nasal vowels in bã, mã, suggesting that nasals become prenasalized stops before oral vowels. Historically, however, *mb became **mm before nasal vowels, and then reduced to *m, leaving the current asymmetric distribution.

In some older speakers of the Tlingit language, [l] and [n] are allophones of each other, although [l] is mostly obsolete now. The lack of a plain /l/ for most speakers despite the existence of several other lateral obstruents has been noted as typologically unusual.

=== Lack of phonetic nasals ===
Several of languages surrounding Puget Sound, such as Quileute (Chimakuan family), Lushootseed (Salishan family), and Makah (Wakashan family), are truly without any nasalization whatsoever, in consonants or vowels, except in special speech registers such as baby talk or the archaic speech of mythological figures (and perhaps not even that in the case of Quileute). This is an areal feature, only a few hundred years old, where nasals became voiced stops ([m] became [b], [n] became [d], [ɳ] became [ɖ], [ɲ] became [ɟ], [ŋ] became [g], [ŋʷ] became [gʷ], [ɴ] became [ɢ], etc.) after colonial contact. For example, "Snohomish" is currently pronounced sdohobish, but was transcribed with nasals in the first English-language records.

The only other places in the world where this is known to occur are in Melanesia. In the central dialect of the Rotokas language of Bougainville Island, nasals are only used when imitating foreign accents. (A second dialect has a series of nasals.) The Lakes Plain languages of West Irian are similar.

The unconditioned loss of nasals, as in Puget Sound, is unusual. Currently in Korean, /m/ and /n/ are shifting to [b] and [d], but only word-initially. This started out in nonstandard dialects and was restricted to the beginning of prosodic units (a common position for fortition), but has expanded to many speakers of the standard language to the beginnings of common words even within prosodic units.

== See also ==
- Oral consonant
- Nasal click
- Nasal vowel
- Nasalization
- List of phonetics topics
- Syllabic consonant

== Bibliography ==
- Ferguson (1963) 'Assumptions about nasals', in Greenberg (ed.) Universals of Language, pp. 50–60.
- Saout, J. le (1973) 'Languages sans consonnes nasales', Annales de l Université d'Abidjan, H, 6, 1, 179–205.

Place →	Labial					Coronal										Dorsal					Laryngeal			
Manner ↓	Bilabial		Labiodental		Linguolabial		Dental		Alveolar		Postalveolar		Retroflex		(Alveolo-)palatal		Velar		Uvular		Pharyngeal/epiglottal		Glottal	
Nasal	m̥	m	ɱ̊	ɱ		n̼	n̪̊	n̪	n̥	n	n̠̊	n̠	ɳ̊	ɳ	ɲ̊	ɲ	ŋ̊	ŋ	ɴ̥	ɴ				
Plosive	p	b	p̪	b̪	t̼	d̼	t̪	d̪	t	d			ʈ	ɖ	c	ɟ	k	ɡ	q	ɢ	ʡ		ʔ	
Sibilant affricate							ts̪	dz̪	ts	dz	tʃ	dʒ	tʂ	dʐ	tɕ	dʑ								
Non-sibilant affricate	pɸ	bβ	p̪f	b̪v			tθ	dð	tɹ̝̊	dɹ̝	t̠ɹ̝̊	d̠ɹ̝			cç	ɟʝ	kx	ɡɣ	qχ	ɢʁ	ʡʜ	ʡʢ	ʔh	
Sibilant fricative							s̪	z̪	s	z	ʃ	ʒ	ʂ	ʐ	ɕ	ʑ								
Non-sibilant fricative	ɸ	β	f	v	θ̼	ð̼	θ	ð	θ̠	ð̠	ɹ̝̠̊	ɹ̠᷵	ɻ̥᷵	ɻ᷵	ç	ʝ	x	ɣ	χ	ʁ	ħ	ʕ	h	ɦ
Approximant		β̞		ʋ				ð̞		ɹ		ɹ̠		ɻ		j		ɰ						˷
Tap/flap		ⱱ̟		ⱱ					ɾ̥	ɾ			ɽ̊	ɽ						ɢ̆		ʡ̮		
Trill	ʙ̥	ʙ							r̥	r		r̠	ɽ̊r̥	ɽr					ʀ̥	ʀ	ʜ	ʢ		
Lateral affricate									tɬ	dɮ			tꞎ	d𝼅	c𝼆	ɟʎ̝	k𝼄	ɡʟ̝						
Lateral fricative							ɬ̪		ɬ	ɮ			ꞎ	𝼅	𝼆	ʎ̝	𝼄	ʟ̝						
Lateral approximant								l̪	l̥	l		l̠	ɭ̊	ɭ	ʎ̥	ʎ	ʟ̥	ʟ		ʟ̠				
Lateral tap/flap									ɺ̥	ɺ			𝼈̊	𝼈		ʎ̮		ʟ̆						

		BL	LD	D	A	PA	RF	P	V	U
Implosive	Voiced	ɓ			ɗ		ᶑ	ʄ	ɠ	ʛ
Implosive	Voiceless	ɓ̥			ɗ̥		ᶑ̊	ʄ̊	ɠ̊	ʛ̥
Ejective	Stop	pʼ			tʼ		ʈʼ	cʼ	kʼ	qʼ
Ejective	Affricate		p̪fʼ	tθʼ	tsʼ	tʃʼ	tʂʼ	tɕʼ	kxʼ	qχʼ
Ejective	Fricative	ɸʼ	fʼ	θʼ	sʼ	ʃʼ	ʂʼ	ɕʼ	xʼ	χʼ
Ejective	Lateral affricate				tɬʼ			c𝼆ʼ	k𝼄ʼ	q𝼄ʼ
Ejective	Lateral fricative				ɬʼ					
Click (top: velar; bottom: uvular)	Tenuis	kʘ qʘ		kǀ qǀ	kǃ qǃ		k𝼊 q𝼊	kǂ qǂ		
Click (top: velar; bottom: uvular)	Voiced	ɡʘ ɢʘ		ɡǀ ɢǀ	ɡǃ ɢǃ		ɡ𝼊 ɢ𝼊	ɡǂ ɢǂ		
Click (top: velar; bottom: uvular)	Nasal	ŋʘ ɴʘ		ŋǀ ɴǀ	ŋǃ ɴǃ		ŋ𝼊 ɴ𝼊	ŋǂ ɴǂ	ʞ	
Click (top: velar; bottom: uvular)	Tenuis lateral				kǁ qǁ					
Click (top: velar; bottom: uvular)	Voiced lateral				ɡǁ ɢǁ					
Click (top: velar; bottom: uvular)	Nasal lateral				ŋǁ ɴǁ					
