= Khamba language =

Sino-Tibetan language of India

Khamba
- Native to: India
- Region: Arunachal Pradesh
- Native speakers: 500-700 (2016)
- Language family: Sino-Tibetan: Tibeto-Burman; Tibeto-Kanauri (?); Bodish; Tibetic; (unclassified); Khamba

Language codes
- ISO 639-3: kbg
- Glottolog: kham1283
- ELP: Khamba

Khamba is an endangered and severely underdocumented Sino-Tibetan language spoken by Khamba people in Upper Siang district, Arunachal Pradesh, India.

It is generally classified as Tibetic but its precise position with the branch is unclear because of lack of reliable language data. Glottolog defines it as "unclassified Southern Tibetic". Van Driem classifies it with Khams Tibetan. According to the Central Institute of Indian Languages, a grammar description and a bilingual dictionary of Khamba are being prepared under the Scheme for Protection and Preservation of Endangered Languages.

== Language situation ==
Despite their small population, Khamba speakers form a separate Scheduled Tribe recognized by the government of India. Most Khamba speakers are reported to be multilingual, with many of them speaking Hindi, Minyong, Assamese, Memba and basic English.
