= Banbar County =

County in Chamdo, Tibet, China

Banbar County 边坝县 • དཔལ་འབར་རྫོང་། Palbar
- County
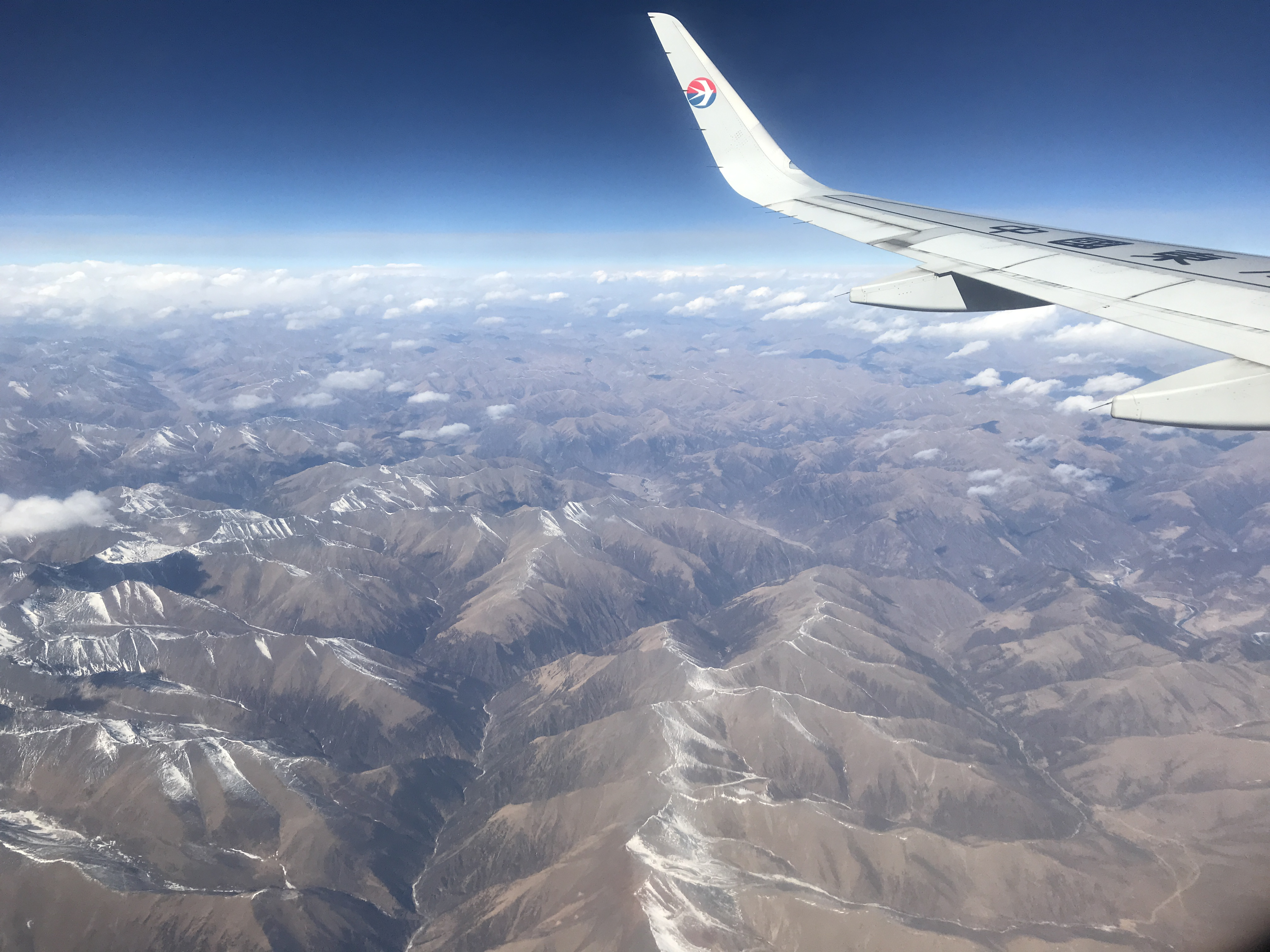
- Aerial view of Banbar County.

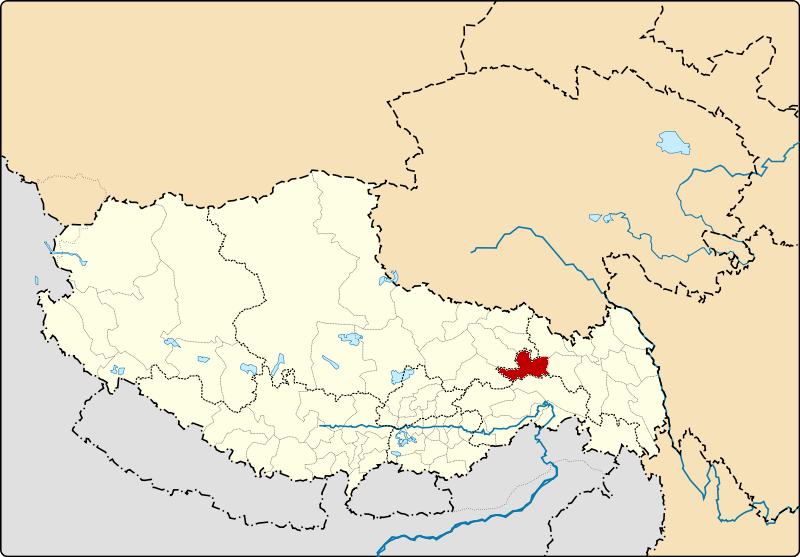
- Location of Banbar County within Tibet Autonomous Region

- Location in Tibet Banbar County (China)
- Coordinates: 30°56′N 94°42′E
- Country: China
- Autonomous region: Tibet
- Prefecture-level city: Chamdo
- County seat: Coka

Area
  - Total: 8,775.18 km^{2} (3,388.12 sq mi)

Population (2020)
  - Total: 42,716
  - Density: 4.8678/km^{2} (12.608/sq mi)
- Time zone: UTC+8 (China Standard)
- Website: bianba.changdu.gov.cn

Banbar County

Chinese name
- Simplified Chinese: 边坝县
- Traditional Chinese: 邊壩縣
Transcriptions
Standard Mandarin
- Hanyu Pinyin: Biānbà Xiàn
Yue: Cantonese
- Jyutping: bin^{1}baa^{3} jyun^{2}

Tibetan name
- Tibetan: དཔལ་འབར་རྫོང་།
Transcriptions
- Wylie: dpal 'bar rdzong
- Tibetan Pinyin: Bainbar Zong

Banbar County (Tibetan: དཔལ་འབར་རྫོང་།; Chinese: 边坝县) is a county of the Chamdo in the Tibet Autonomous Region, China. The seat is the town of Coka.

== Subdivisions ==
Banbar County contains 2 towns and 9 townships.

Name	Chinese	Hanyu Pinyin	Tibetan	Wylie
Towns
Banbar Town	边坝镇	Biānbà zhèn	དཔལ་འབར་གྲོང་རྡལ།	dpal 'bar grong rdal
Coka Town	草卡镇	Cǎokǎ zhèn	མཚོ་ཁ་གྲོང་རྡལ།	mtsho kha grong rdal
Townships
Sadêng Township	沙丁乡	Shādīng xiāng	ས་སྟེང་ཤང་།	sa sting shang
Jiling Township	金岭乡	Jīnlǐng xiāng	སྤྱི་གླིང་ཤང་།	spyi gling shang
Jaggong Township	加贡乡	Jiāgòng xiāng	ལྕགས་གོང་ཤང་།	lcags gong shang
Mau Township	马武乡	Mǎwǔ xiāng	རྨའུ་ཤང་།	rma'u shang
Rayü Township	热玉乡	Rèyù xiāng	ར་ཡུལ་ཤང་།	ra yul shang
Nyinmo Township	尼木乡	Nímù xiāng	ཉིན་མོ་ཤང་།	nyin mo shang
Marxog Township	马秀乡	Mǎxiù xiāng	མར་ཤོག་ཤང་།	mar shog shang
Lhazê Township	拉孜乡	Lāzī xiāng	ལྷ་རྩེ་ཤང་།	lha rtse shang
Dowa Township	都瓦乡	Dūwǎ xiāng	རྡོ་དབར་ཤང་།	rdo dbar shang

=== Villages ===
- Domartang
