= Uvular consonant =

Consonants produced with tongue near or against the uvula

Uvulars are consonants articulated with the back of the tongue against or near the uvula, that is, further back in the mouth than velar consonants. Uvulars may be stops, fricatives, nasals, trills, or approximants, though the IPA does not provide a separate symbol for the approximant, and the symbol for the voiced fricative is used instead. Uvular affricates can certainly be made but are rare: they occur in most Turkic languages, most Persian languages, most Arabic languages, in some southern High-German dialects, as well as a few African and Native American languages. (Ejective uvular affricates occur as realizations of uvular stops in Kazakh, Bashkir, Arabic dialects, Lillooet, or as allophonic realizations of the ejective uvular fricative in Georgian.) Uvular consonants are typically incompatible with advanced tongue root, and they often cause retraction of neighboring vowels.

== Uvular consonants in IPA ==
The uvular consonants identified by the International Phonetic Alphabet are:

IPA	Description	Example			
IPA	Description	Language	Orthography	IPA	Meaning
ɴ̥	voiceless uvular nasal	Lamo			
ɴ	voiced uvular nasal	Bai (Luobenzhuo dialect)	我 (nò)	[ɴɔ˦˨]	'I'
q	voiceless uvular plosive	Arabic	قصّةٌ (qiṣṣatun)	[qisˤˈsˤɑtun]	'a story'
ɢ	voiced uvular plosive	Inuktitut	utirama	[ʔutiɢama]	'because I return'
q͡χ	voiceless uvular affricate	Kabardian	кхъэ	[q͡χa]	'grave'
ɢ͡ʁ	voiced uvular affricate	Ekagi	gaati	[ɢ͡ʁaːti]	'ten'
χ	voiceless uvular fricative	Peninsular Spanish	enjuto	[ẽ̞ɴˈχut̪o̞]	'skinny'
ʁ	voiced uvular fricative	French	rester	[ʁɛste]	'to stay'
ʁ̞	voiced uvular approximant	Danish	rød	[ʁ̞œ̠ð̠]	'red'
ʟ̠	voiced uvular lateral approximant	English (some American speakers)	wool	[wʊʟ̠]	'wool'
ɢ̆	voiced uvular flap	Hiw	[βɔ̞ʀ̆]		'hibiscus'
ʀ̥	voiceless uvular trill	French (Belgian)	triste	[t̪ʀ̥is̪t̪œ]	'sad'
ʀ	voiced uvular trill	French (20th century Paris accent)	Paris	[paˈʀi]	'Paris'
ʀ̆	voiced uvular tap or flap	Yiddish	בריק	[bʀ̆ɪk]	'bridge'
qʼ	uvular ejective stop	Quechua	q'allu	[ˈqʼaʎu]	'section, piece, slice, sauce'
q͡χʼ	uvular ejective affricate	Georgian	ყოფა q'opa	[q͡χʼɔpʰɑ]	'being/existence'
χʼ	uvular ejective fricative	Tlingit	x̱'aan	[χʼàːn]	'fire'
ʛ	voiced uvular implosive	Konso	pogoota	[poʛoːta]	'mandible'
ʛ̥ (ʠ)	voiceless uvular implosive	Mam	q'ootj	[ʛ̥oːtʰχ]	'dough'
ʞ᫢	uvular-released click	Wolof (paralexical)	[ʞ᫢] (allophonic with velar [ʞ])		'yes'

== Descriptions in different languages ==
Uvular consonants are produced near marker 9.

English has no uvular consonants (at least in most major dialects), and they are largely unknown in the indigenous languages of Australia and the Pacific, though uvular consonants separate from velar consonants are believed to have existed in the Proto-Oceanic language and are attested in the modern Formosan languages of Taiwan, while a uvular approximant may occur in Arrernte. Uvular consonants are, however, found in many Middle-Eastern and African languages, most notably Arabic and Somali, and in native American languages. In parts of the Caucasus mountains and northwestern North America, nearly every language has uvular stops and fricatives. Two uvular R phonemes are found in various languages in northwestern Europe, including French, some Occitan dialects, a majority of German dialects, some Dutch dialects, and Danish. Uvulars are almost unknown in the Indian subcontinent, but have been found in Malto and Kusunda natively. However, several languages spoken in the northwest of the subcontinent have loaned uvular consonants from Arabic and even Persian, especially languages that were spoken in places that were under Muslim rule for long periods of time, such as Punjabi.

The voiceless uvular stop is transcribed as [q] in the IPA. It is pronounced somewhat like the voiceless velar stop [k], but with the middle of the tongue further back on the velum, against or near the uvula. The most familiar use will doubtless be in the transliteration of Arabic place names such as Qatar and Iraq into English, though, since English lacks this sound, this is generally pronounced as [k], the most similar sound that occurs in English.

[qʼ], the uvular ejective, is found in Ubykh, Tlingit, Cusco Quechua, and some others. In Georgian, the existence of this phoneme is debatable, since the general realization of the letter "ყ" is /χʼ/. This is due to /qʰ/ merging with /χ/ and therefore /qʼ/ being influenced by this merger and becoming /χʼ/.

[ɢ], the voiced equivalent of [q], is much rarer. It is like the voiced velar stop [ɡ], but articulated in the same uvular position as [q]. Few languages use this sound, but it is found in Iranian Persian (and allophonicly in other varieties of Persian) and in some Northeast Caucasian languages, notably Tabasaran, and Pacific Northwest, such as Kwakʼwala. It may also occur as an allophone of another uvular consonant. In Kazakh, the voiced uvular stop is an allophone of the voiced uvular fricative after the velar nasal.

The voiceless uvular fricative [χ] is similar to the voiceless velar fricative [x], except that it is articulated near the uvula. It is found in Georgian, and instead of [x] in some dialects of German, Spanish, and colloquial Arabic, as well as in some Dutch varieties and in standard Afrikaans.

Uvular flaps have been reported for Kube (Trans–New Guinea), Hamtai (Angan family), and for the variety of Khmer spoken in Battambang province.

The Enqi dialect of the Bai language has an unusually complete series of uvular consonants consisting of the stops /q/, /qʰ/ and /ɢ/, the fricatives /χ/ and /ʁ/, and the nasal /ɴ/. All of these contrast with a corresponding velar consonant of the same manner of articulation. The existence of the uvular nasal is especially unusual, even more so than the existence of the voiced stop.

The Tlingit language of the Alaska Panhandle has ten uvular consonants, all of which are voiceless obstruents, while the extinct Ubykh language of Turkey has twenty. The Tlingit uvular consonants are:

Uvulars in Tlingit
Description	Orthographic	IPA	Gloss
tenuis stop	g̱ákw	qákʷ	'tree spine'
aspirated stop	ḵákw	qʰákʷ	'basket'
ejective stop	ḵʼákw	qʼakʷ	'screech owl'
labialized tenuis stop	náaḵw	náaqʷ	'octopus'
labialized aspirated stop	ḵwáan	qʷʰáan	'people, tribe'
labialized ejective stop	ḵʼwátl	qʷʼátɬ	'cooking pot'
voiceless fricative	x̱aakw	χaakʷ	'fingernail'
ejective fricative	x̱ʼáakw	χʼáakʷ	'freshwater sockeye salmon'
labialized voiceless fricative	x̱wastáa	χʷastáa	'canvas, denim'
labialized ejective fricative	x̱wʼáalʼ	χʷʼáaɬʼ	'down (feathers)'

== Phonological representation ==
In featural phonology, uvular consonants are most often considered to contrast with velar consonants in terms of being [−high] and [+back]. Prototypical uvulars also appear to be [−ATR].

Two variants can then be established. Since palatalized consonants are [−back], the appearance of palatalized uvulars in a few languages such as Ubykh is difficult to account for. According to Vaux (1999), they possibly hold the features [+high], [−back], [−ATR], the last being the distinguishing feature from a palatalized velar consonant.

== Uvular rhotics ==
The uvular trill [ʀ] is used in certain dialects (especially those associated with European capitals) of French, German, Dutch, Portuguese, Danish, Swedish and Norwegian, as well as sometimes in Modern Hebrew, for the rhotic phoneme. In many of these it has a uvular fricative (either voiced [ʁ] or voiceless [χ]) as an allophone when it follows one of the voiceless stops /p/, /t/, or /k/ at the end of a word, as in the French example maître [mɛtχ], or even a uvular approximant [ʁ̞].

As with most trills, uvular trills are often reduced to a single contact, especially between vowels.

Unlike other uvular consonants, the uvular trill is articulated without a retraction of the tongue, and therefore doesn't lower neighboring high vowels the way uvular stops commonly do.

Several other languages, including Inuktitut, Abkhaz, Uyghur and some varieties of Arabic, have a voiced uvular fricative but do not treat it as a rhotic consonant. However, Modern Hebrew and some modern varieties of Arabic also both have at least one uvular fricative that is considered non-rhotic, and one that is considered rhotic.

In Lakhota the uvular trill is an allophone of the voiced uvular fricative before /i/.

== See also ==
- Uvularization
- Place of articulation
- List of phonetics topics
- Guttural R
- Retracted vowels

== Notes ==
Place →	Labial					Coronal										Dorsal					Laryngeal			
Manner ↓	Bilabial		Labiodental		Linguolabial		Dental		Alveolar		Postalveolar		Retroflex		(Alveolo-)palatal		Velar		Uvular		Pharyngeal/epiglottal		Glottal	
Nasal	m̥	m	ɱ̊	ɱ		n̼	n̪̊	n̪	n̥	n	n̠̊	n̠	ɳ̊	ɳ	ɲ̊	ɲ	ŋ̊	ŋ	ɴ̥	ɴ				
Plosive	p	b	p̪	b̪	t̼	d̼	t̪	d̪	t	d			ʈ	ɖ	c	ɟ	k	ɡ	q	ɢ	ʡ		ʔ	
Sibilant affricate							t̪s̪	d̪z̪	ts	dz	t̠ʃ	d̠ʒ	tʂ	dʐ	tɕ	dʑ								
Non-sibilant affricate	pɸ	bβ	p̪f	b̪v			t̪θ	d̪ð	tɹ̝̊	dɹ̝	t̠ɹ̠̊˔	d̠ɹ̠˔			cç	ɟʝ	kx	ɡɣ	qχ	ɢʁ	ʡʜ	ʡʢ	ʔh	
Sibilant fricative							s̪	z̪	s	z	ʃ	ʒ	ʂ	ʐ	ɕ	ʑ								
Non-sibilant fricative	ɸ	β	f	v	θ̼	ð̼	θ	ð	θ̠	ð̠	ɹ̠̊˔	ɹ̠˔	ɻ̊˔	ɻ˔	ç	ʝ	x	ɣ	χ	ʁ	ħ	ʕ	h	ɦ
Approximant		β̞		ʋ				ð̞		ɹ		ɹ̠		ɻ		j		ɰ						˷
Tap/flap		ⱱ̟		ⱱ					ɾ̥	ɾ			ɽ̊	ɽ						ɢ̆		ʡ̆		
Trill	ʙ̥	ʙ							r̥	r		r̠	ɽ̊r̥	ɽr					ʀ̥	ʀ	ʜ	ʢ		
Lateral affricate									tɬ	dɮ			tꞎ	d𝼅	c𝼆	ɟʎ̝	k𝼄	ɡʟ̝						
Lateral fricative							ɬ̪		ɬ	ɮ			ꞎ	𝼅	𝼆	ʎ̝	𝼄	ʟ̝						
Lateral approximant								l̪	l̥	l		l̠	ɭ̊	ɭ	ʎ̥	ʎ	ʟ̥	ʟ		ʟ̠				
Lateral tap/flap									ɺ̥	ɺ			𝼈̊	𝼈		ʎ̆		ʟ̆						

		BL	LD	D	A	PA	RF	P	V	U
Implosive	Voiced	ɓ			ɗ		ᶑ	ʄ	ɠ	ʛ
Implosive	Voiceless	ɓ̥			ɗ̥		ᶑ̊	ʄ̊	ɠ̊	ʛ̥
Ejective	Stop	pʼ			tʼ		ʈʼ	cʼ	kʼ	qʼ
Ejective	Affricate		p̪fʼ	t̪θʼ	tsʼ	t̠ʃʼ	tʂʼ	tɕʼ	kxʼ	qχʼ
Ejective	Fricative	ɸʼ	fʼ	θʼ	sʼ	ʃʼ	ʂʼ	ɕʼ	xʼ	χʼ
Ejective	Lateral affricate				tɬʼ			c𝼆ʼ	k𝼄ʼ	q𝼄ʼ
Ejective	Lateral fricative				ɬʼ					
Click (top: velar; bottom: uvular)	Tenuis	kʘ qʘ		kǀ qǀ	kǃ qǃ		k𝼊 q𝼊	kǂ qǂ		
Click (top: velar; bottom: uvular)	Voiced	ɡʘ ɢʘ		ɡǀ ɢǀ	ɡǃ ɢǃ		ɡ𝼊 ɢ𝼊	ɡǂ ɢǂ		
Click (top: velar; bottom: uvular)	Nasal	ŋʘ ɴʘ		ŋǀ ɴǀ	ŋǃ ɴǃ		ŋ𝼊 ɴ𝼊	ŋǂ ɴǂ	ʞ	
Click (top: velar; bottom: uvular)	Tenuis lateral				kǁ qǁ					
Click (top: velar; bottom: uvular)	Voiced lateral				ɡǁ ɢǁ					
Click (top: velar; bottom: uvular)	Nasal lateral				ŋǁ ɴǁ					
