= Khams Tibetan =

Tibetic language of Kham

- ཁམས་སྐད Khams skad, Khamké
- Region: Khams (Tibet Autonomous Region, Qinghai, Sichuan, Yunnan in China); Bhutan
- Native speakers: 2 million (2022)
- Language family: Sino-Tibetan: Tibeto-Burman; Tibeto-Kanauri (?); Bodish; Tibetic; Khams Tibetan
- Writing system: Tibetan script

Language codes
- ISO 639-3: Variously: khg – Khams kbg – Khamba tsk – Tseku
- Glottolog: kham1299
- ELP: Khamba

Khams Tibetan (Tibetan: ཁམས་སྐད, Wylie: Khams skad, THL: Khamké, Lhasa dialect: [kʰam˥˨ kɛː˥˨], Khams Tibetan pronunciation: [kʰɑ̃ː˥˧ kɛˀˑ] (Dêgê dialect)) is the Tibetic language spoken by the majority of the people in Kham. Khams is one of the three branches of the traditional classification of Tibetic languages (the other two being Amdo Tibetan and "Central" or Ü-Tsang Tibetan). In terms of mutual intelligibility, Khams can communicate at a basic level with the Ü-Tsang branch (including Lhasa Tibetan).

Both Khams Tibetan and Lhasa Tibetan have lost the word-initial consonant clusters of Old Tibetan, which makes them very different from Old Tibetan, as well as from the more conservative Amdo Tibetan. Both Khams and Lhasa Tibetan have also become tonal, which Old Tibetan was not. Khams Tibetan shows 80% lexical similarity with Central (e.g., Lhasa) Tibetan.

== Distribution ==
Kham Tibetan is spoken in Kham, which is now divided between the eastern part of Tibet Autonomous Region, the southern part of Qinghai, the western part of Sichuan, and the northwestern part of Yunnan, China.

Khampa Tibetan is also spoken by about 1,000 people in two enclaves in eastern Bhutan, the descendants of pastoral yak-herding communities.

== Dialects ==
There are five dialects of Khams Tibetan proper:

- Central Khams, spoken in Dêgê County and Chamdo
- Southern Khams, spoken in Dêqên Tibetan Autonomous Prefecture and Kongpo. There are several subdialects due to the mountainous terrain, as well as contact with neighboring language communities for trade.
- Northern or Northeastern Khams, spoken in formerly known as Nangchen / Nangqên County and now Yushu Tibetan Autonomous Prefecture
- Eastern Khams, spoken in Kangding
- Hor, or Western Khams, spoken in Nagqu Prefecture
- The Gêrzê dialect is sometimes considered Western Khams.

Khamba is more divergent, but classified with Khams by George Van Driem.

The various varieties of Khams Tibetan have relatively low mutual intelligibility. Sun (2026) does not consider Khams Tibetan to be a unified monophyletic taxon, but rather a polyphyletic grouping.

Several other languages are spoken by Tibetans in the Khams region: Dongwang Tibetan language and the Rgyalrong languages.

The phonologies and vocabularies of the Bodgrong, Dartsendo, dGudzong, Khyungpo (Khromtshang), Lhagang Rangakha, Sangdam, Sogpho, sKobsteng, sPomtserag, Tsharethong, and Yangthang dialects of Kham Tibetan have been documented by Hiroyuki Suzuki.

Other Khams Tibetan varieties include:

- Lhagang, a Minyag Rabgang Khams dialect (Suzuki and Sonam Wangmo 2017)
- Lethong, a Southern Route Khams dialect (Suzuki 2018b)
- Choswateng, belonging to the rGyalthang group of Sems-kyi-nyila Khams (Suzuki 2018a)
- Stonggnyen, a divergent Tibetan variety spoken in Daocheng County, Sichuan (Sun 2026) that may be closely related to related to Lamdo, a Sems-kyi-nyila Khams Tibetan variety spoken in G.yangmdo Village 浪都村, Skadtshag Township 格咱乡 (skad tshag), Shangri-La City, Yunnan.

Deng (2020) documents 1,707 words in the following three Khams Tibetan dialects:

- Cawagang 擦瓦岗, Yiqing Township 益庆乡, Pasho County, Chamdo Prefecture
- Upper Batang Village 上巴塘村, Batang Township 巴塘乡, Yushu County, Qinghai
- Rongbu Town 荣布镇, Sog County, Nagqu Prefecture

== Phonology ==
=== Consonants ===
		Labial	Alveolar			Retroflex	(Alveolo-) palatal	Velar	Glottal
		Labial	plain	lateral	sibilant	Retroflex	(Alveolo-) palatal	Velar	Glottal
Nasal	voiceless	m̥	n̥				ɲ̊	ŋ̊	
Nasal	voiced	m	n				ɲ	ŋ	
Plosive/ Affricate	tenuis	p	t		ts	tʂ	tɕ	k	ʔ
Plosive/ Affricate	aspirated	pʰ	tʰ		tsʰ	tʂʰ	tɕʰ	kʰ	
Plosive/ Affricate	voiced	b	d		dz	dʐ	dʑ	ɡ	
Fricative	tenuis			ɬ	s	ʂ	ɕ	x	h
Fricative	aspirated				sʰ		ɕʰ	xʰ	
Fricative	voiced				z		ʑ	ɣ	
Approximant		w	ɹ	l			j		

- /x, xʰ, ɣ/ before front vowels /i, e, ø, ɛ/ are realized as palatal fricatives [ç, çʰ, ʝ].
- Palatal plosives /c, ɟ/ are included in the consonant inventory of the dGudzong dialect, but these sound values may include a phonetic variant of palatalised velar plosives. The velar plosive series generally do not include a phonetic variant of palatal plosives. These two series, therefore, are still distinctive, but it is supposed that they may merge into velar ones in the near future.
- /tʂ, tʂʰ, dʐ/ are heard as plosives [ʈ, ʈʰ, ɖ] in the dGudzong dialect of the rGyalrong area.
- /ɬ/ may also be heard as a voiceless lateral [l̥] in free variation.

=== Vowels ===
	Front		Back
Close	i		u
Close-mid	e	ø	o
Open-mid	ɛ		
Open	a		ɑ

- /i, u, o/ are realized as sounds [ɨ, ʉ, ʊ] before a glottal stop /ʔ/.

== See also ==
- Amdo Tibetan
- Central Tibetan
- Lhasa Tibetan
- Balti language
- Languages of Bhutan
- Sound correspondences between Tibetic languages
