= Zogang County =

Zogang County 左贡县 • མཛོ་སྒང་རྫོང་།
- County
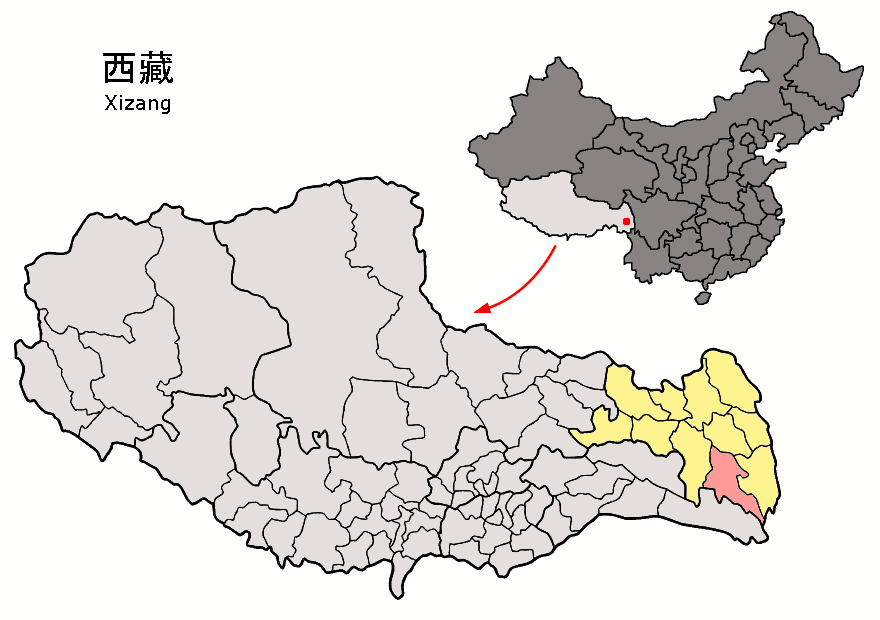
- Location of Zogang County within Tibet Autonomous Region

- Location in Tibet Autonomous Region Zogang County (China)
- Coordinates: 29°40′26″N 97°50′24″E
- Country: China
- Autonomous region: Tibet
- Prefecture-level city: Chamdo
- County seat: Uyak

Area
  - Total: 11,839.8 km^{2} (4,571.4 sq mi)

Population (2020)
  - Total: 46,608
  - Density: 3.9366/km^{2} (10.196/sq mi)
- Time zone: UTC+8 (China Standard)
- Website: zuogong.changdu.gov.cn

Zogang County

Chinese name
- Simplified Chinese: 左贡县
- Traditional Chinese: 左貢縣
Transcriptions
Standard Mandarin
- Hanyu Pinyin: Zuǒgòng Xiàn

Tibetan name
- Tibetan: མཛོ་སྒང་རྫོང་།
Transcriptions
- Wylie: mdzo sgang rdzong
- Tibetan Pinyin: Zogang Zong

Zogong County (Tibetan: མཛོ་སྒང་རྫོང་; Chinese: 左贡县) is a county of the Chamdo Prefecture in the Tibet Autonomous Region, China.

== Administrative divisions ==
Zogong County is divided in 3 towns and 7 townships.

Name	Chinese	Hanyu Pinyin	Tibetan	Wylie
Town
Uyak Town	旺达镇	Wàngdá zhèn	དབུ་ཡག་གྲོང་རྡལ།	dbu yag grong rdal
Temtok Town	田妥镇	Tiántuǒ zhèn	ཐེམ་ཐོག་གྲོང་རྡལ།	them thog grong rdal
Oktang Town	扎玉镇	Zhāyù zhèn	འོག་ཐང་གྲོང་རྡལ།	'og thang grong rdal
Townships
Dobbar Township	东坝乡	Dōngbà xiāng	སྟོབས་འབར་ཤང་།	stobs 'bar shang
Rigo Township	仁果乡	Rénguǒ xiāng	རི་མགོ་ཤང་།	ri mgo shang
Rabchen Township	绕金乡	Ràojīn xiāng	རབ་ཆེན་ཤང་།	rab chen shang
Pütog Township	碧土乡	Bìtǔ xiāng	བུལ་ཐོག་ཤང་།	bul thog shang
Maiyü Township	美玉乡	Měiyù xiāng	སྨད་ཡུལ་ཤང་།	smad yul shang
Zhonglingka Township (Zhong Lingka)	中林卡乡	Zhōnglínkǎ xiāng	ཀྲུང་གླིང་ཁ་ཤང་།	krung gling kha shang
Zhalingkha Township	下林卡乡	Xiàlínkǎ xiāng	ཞྭ་གླིང་ཁ་ཤང་།	zhwa gling kha shang

== Climate ==
Climate data for Zogang, elevation 3,780 m (12,400 ft), (1991–2020 normals, extremes 1981–2010)
Month	Jan	Feb	Mar	Apr	May	Jun	Jul	Aug	Sep	Oct	Nov	Dec	Year
Record high °C (°F)	17.2 (63.0)	15.9 (60.6)	21.6 (70.9)	22.2 (72.0)	25.0 (77.0)	26.3 (79.3)	27.9 (82.2)	25.4 (77.7)	24.7 (76.5)	22.0 (71.6)	17.4 (63.3)	15.3 (59.5)	27.9 (82.2)
Mean daily maximum °C (°F)	4.7 (40.5)	6.6 (43.9)	9.3 (48.7)	12.7 (54.9)	17.0 (62.6)	20.6 (69.1)	20.2 (68.4)	19.8 (67.6)	18.5 (65.3)	14.6 (58.3)	9.7 (49.5)	5.9 (42.6)	13.3 (56.0)
Daily mean °C (°F)	−4.6 (23.7)	−2.2 (28.0)	1.2 (34.2)	4.8 (40.6)	9.2 (48.6)	13.3 (55.9)	13.3 (55.9)	12.6 (54.7)	11.0 (51.8)	6.2 (43.2)	0.2 (32.4)	−4.0 (24.8)	5.1 (41.2)
Mean daily minimum °C (°F)	−12.1 (10.2)	−9.5 (14.9)	−5.2 (22.6)	−1.1 (30.0)	3.1 (37.6)	7.8 (46.0)	8.7 (47.7)	8.1 (46.6)	5.9 (42.6)	0.3 (32.5)	−6.6 (20.1)	−11.3 (11.7)	−1.0 (30.2)
Record low °C (°F)	−23.0 (−9.4)	−19.1 (−2.4)	−17.8 (0.0)	−11.4 (11.5)	−8.0 (17.6)	−1.8 (28.8)	0.6 (33.1)	1.2 (34.2)	−1.7 (28.9)	−10.3 (13.5)	−16.7 (1.9)	−22.7 (−8.9)	−23.0 (−9.4)
Average precipitation mm (inches)	0.8 (0.03)	2.4 (0.09)	9.5 (0.37)	17.9 (0.70)	29.9 (1.18)	62.2 (2.45)	139.3 (5.48)	115.5 (4.55)	61.3 (2.41)	14.8 (0.58)	4.4 (0.17)	1.4 (0.06)	459.4 (18.07)
Average precipitation days (≥ 0.1 mm)	1.7	2.5	5.5	8.0	8.4	13.1	20.8	20.5	12.6	4.9	2.6	1.6	102.2
Average snowy days	3.9	5.7	10.3	11.2	3.4	0.2	0.1	0	0.5	3.9	4.5	2.7	46.4
Average relative humidity (%)	44	44	46	50	51	56	68	70	67	56	50	47	54
Mean monthly sunshine hours	184.0	181.6	211.9	204.4	215.1	189.8	156.2	158.3	166.6	189.3	180.7	180.4	2,218.3
Percentage possible sunshine	57	57	57	53	51	45	37	39	46	54	57	57	51
Source: China Meteorological Administration

== Transportation ==
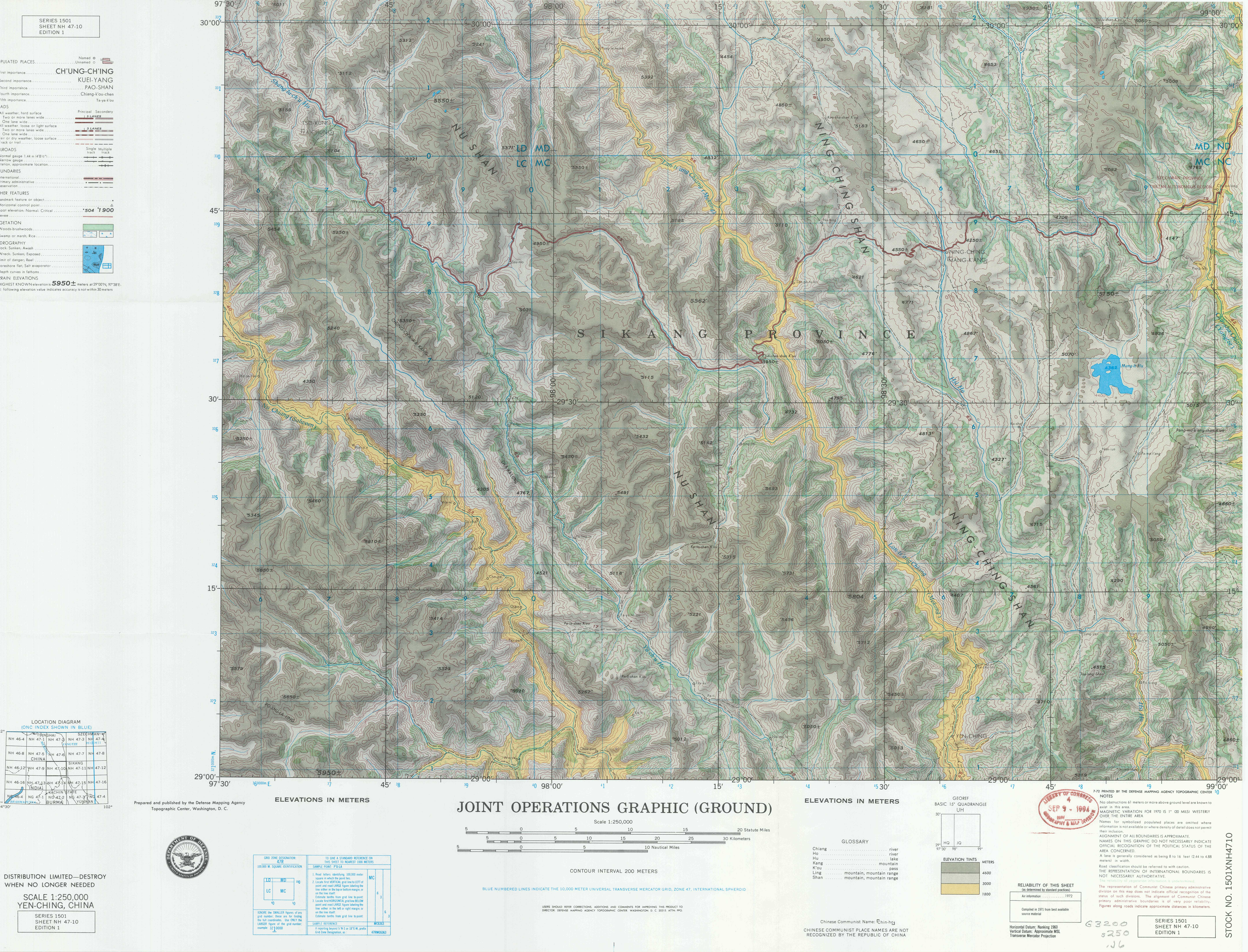

- China National Highway 214
- China National Highway 318
