= Markam County =

Markam County 芒康县 • སྨར་ཁམས་རྫོང་།
- County
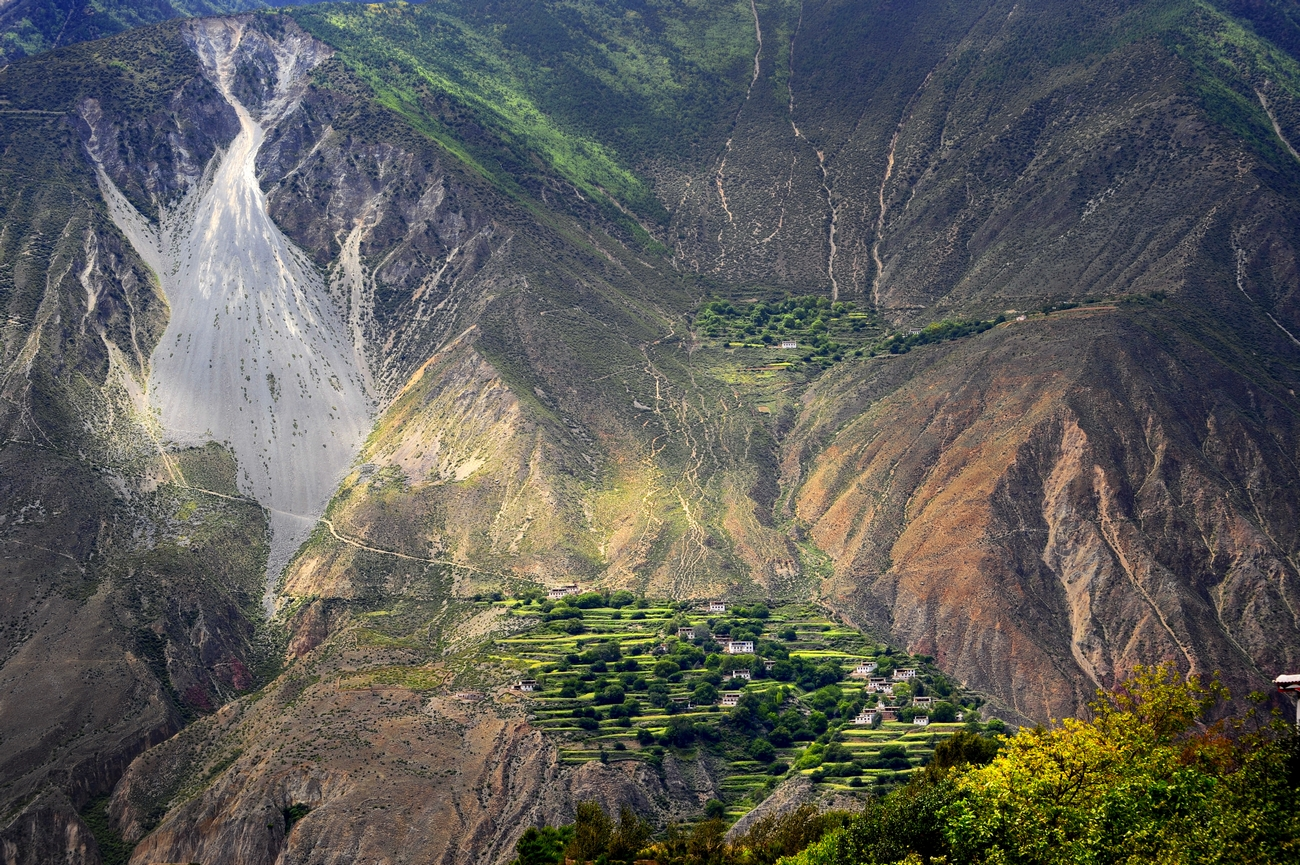

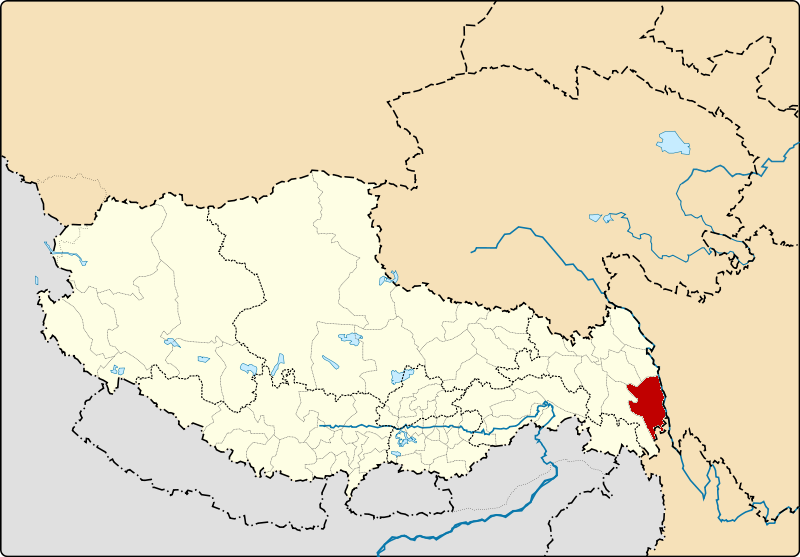
- Location of Markam County within Tibet

- Location in Tibet Markam County (China)
- Coordinates: 29.693°N 98.597°E
- Country: China
- Autonomous region: Tibet
- Prefecture-level city: Chamdo
- County seat: Gartok

Area
  - Total: 11,576.21 km^{2} (4,469.60 sq mi)

Population (2020)
  - Total: 79,001
  - Density: 6.8244/km^{2} (17.675/sq mi)
- Time zone: UTC+8 (China Standard)
- Website: mangkang.changdu.gov.cn

Markam County

Chinese name
- Simplified Chinese: 芒康县
- Traditional Chinese: 芒康縣
Transcriptions
Standard Mandarin
- Hanyu Pinyin: Mángkāng Xiàn

Tibetan name
- Tibetan: སྨར་ཁམས་རྫོང་།
Transcriptions
- Wylie: smar khams rdzong
- Tibetan Pinyin: Markam Zong

Markam or Markham County (Tibetan: སྨར་ཁམས་རྫོང་།; Chinese: 芒康县) is a county under the jurisdiction of Chamdo in the Tibet Autonomous Region, China, bordering the provinces of Sichuan to the east and Yunnan to the south. It is the easternmost county-level division of the Tibet A.R.

== Administrative divisions ==
Markam County is divided in 2 towns, 13 townships, and 1 ethnic township.

| Name | Chinese | Hanyu Pinyin | Tibetan | Wylie |
|---|---|---|---|---|
Towns
| Gartok Town | 嘎托镇 | Gātuō zhèn | སྒར་ཐོག་གྲོང་རྡལ། | sgar thog grong rdal |
| Rongmé Town | 如美镇 | Rúměi zhèn | རོང་སྨད་གྲོང་རྡལ། | rong smad grong rdal |
Townships
| Zurdeshö Township | 索多西乡 | Suǒduōxī xiāng | ཟུར་བདེ་ཤོད་ཤང་། | zur bde shod shang |
| Bumpa Township | 莽岭乡 | Mǎnglǐng xiāng | འབུམ་པ་ཤང་། | 'bum pa shang |
| Tsangshö Township | 宗西乡 | Zōngxī xiāng | གཙང་ཤོད་ཤང་། | gtsang shod shang |
| Gardo Township | 昂多乡 | Ángduō xiāng | མགར་མདོ་ཤང་། | mgar mdo shang |
| Co'nga Township | 措瓦乡 | Cuòwǎ xiāng | མཚོ་རྔ་ཤང་། | mtsho rnga shang |
| Norné Township | 洛尼乡 | Luòní xiāng | ནོར་གནས་ཤང་། | nor gnas shang |
| Göpo Township | 戈波乡 | Gēbō xiāng | རྒོད་པོ་ཤང་། | rgod po shang |
| Pangda Township | 帮达乡 | Bāngdá xiāng | སྤང་མདའ་ཤང་། | spang mda' shang |
| Jidrong Township | 徐中乡 | Xúzhōng xiāng | བྱིས་གྲོངས་ཤང་། | byis grongs shang |
| Chörten Township | 曲登乡 | Qǔdēng xiāng | མཆོད་རྟེན་ཤང་། | mchod rten shang |
| Mokshö Township | 木许乡 | Mùxǔ xiāng | རྨོག་ཤོད་ཤང་། | rmog shod shang |
| Chupalung Township | 朱巴龙乡 | Zhūbālóng xiāng | གྲུ་པ་ལུང་ཤང་། | gru pa lung shang |
| Chutsenkha Township | 曲孜卡乡 | Qǔzīkǎ xiāng | ཆུ་ཚན་ཁ་ཤང་། | chu tshan kha shang |
Ethnic township
| Naxi Ethnic Township | 纳西民族乡 | Nàxī mínzúxiāng | འཇང་མི་རིགས་ཤང་། | 'jang mi rigs shang |

== Climate ==
Climate data for Markam, elevation 3,847 m (12,621 ft), (1991–2020 normals)
| Month | Jan | Feb | Mar | Apr | May | Jun | Jul | Aug | Sep | Oct | Nov | Dec | Year |
|---|---|---|---|---|---|---|---|---|---|---|---|---|---|
| Mean daily maximum °C (°F) | 4.8 (40.6) | 6.3 (43.3) | 8.8 (47.8) | 11.9 (53.4) | 16.1 (61.0) | 19.1 (66.4) | 18.7 (65.7) | 18.3 (64.9) | 17.2 (63.0) | 13.6 (56.5) | 9.3 (48.7) | 6.4 (43.5) | 12.5 (54.6) |
| Daily mean °C (°F) | −5.0 (23.0) | −2.9 (26.8) | 0.4 (32.7) | 4.0 (39.2) | 8.3 (46.9) | 11.9 (53.4) | 12.2 (54.0) | 11.7 (53.1) | 9.9 (49.8) | 5.4 (41.7) | −0.1 (31.8) | −3.9 (25.0) | 4.3 (39.8) |
| Mean daily minimum °C (°F) | −12.9 (8.8) | −10.7 (12.7) | −6.6 (20.1) | −2.5 (27.5) | 1.6 (34.9) | 6.1 (43.0) | 7.8 (46.0) | 7.4 (45.3) | 5.1 (41.2) | −0.7 (30.7) | −7.0 (19.4) | −11.6 (11.1) | −2.0 (28.4) |
| Average precipitation mm (inches) | 1.1 (0.04) | 3.6 (0.14) | 11.0 (0.43) | 22.7 (0.89) | 34.6 (1.36) | 94.7 (3.73) | 175.7 (6.92) | 152.5 (6.00) | 87.8 (3.46) | 17.6 (0.69) | 4.7 (0.19) | 1.6 (0.06) | 607.6 (23.91) |
| Average precipitation days (≥ 0.1 mm) | 1.9 | 3.0 | 5.5 | 9.5 | 9.9 | 16.5 | 21.2 | 20.7 | 14.8 | 6.0 | 2.8 | 1.5 | 113.3 |
| Average snowy days | 4.6 | 5.8 | 10.0 | 12.7 | 4.4 | 0.2 | 0 | 0 | 0.6 | 5.0 | 5.0 | 3.1 | 51.4 |
| Average relative humidity (%) | 46 | 47 | 52 | 56 | 57 | 64 | 72 | 74 | 72 | 63 | 54 | 47 | 59 |
| Mean monthly sunshine hours | 248.8 | 227.0 | 241.0 | 226.4 | 231.6 | 203.5 | 167.5 | 177.0 | 200.8 | 236.1 | 236.5 | 246.7 | 2,642.9 |
| Percentage possible sunshine | 76 | 72 | 64 | 58 | 55 | 49 | 39 | 44 | 55 | 67 | 75 | 78 | 61 |
Source: China Meteorological Administration

== Transportation ==
- China National Highway 214
- China National Highway 318
