= Chamdo =

Qamdo 昌都市 ཆབ་མདོ་གྲོང་ཁྱེར།
- Prefecture-level city
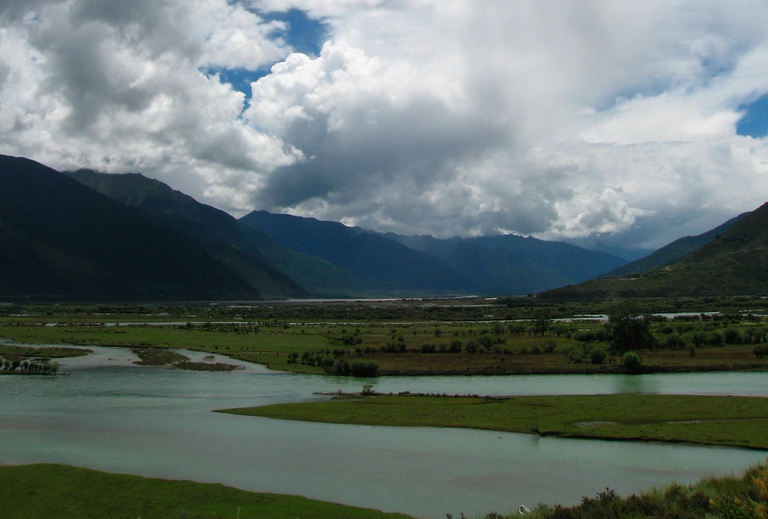
- Mekong River to the south of Chamdo Town

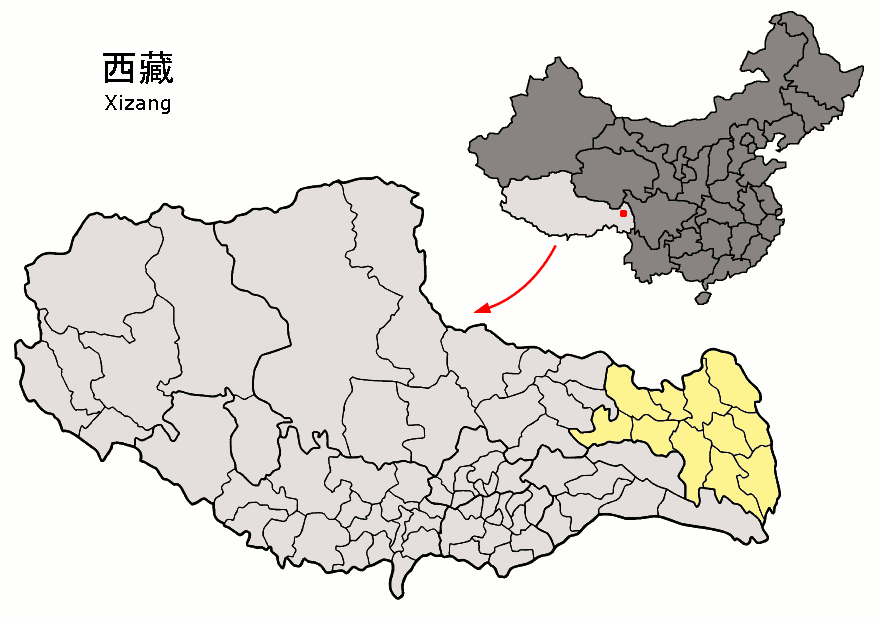
- Location of Qamdo Prefecture within China
- Coordinates (Qamdo municipal government): 31°08′35″N 97°10′12″E
- Country: People's Republic of China
- Autonomous region: Tibet
- County-level divisions: 1 district; 10 counties
- Prefecture seat: Karub District (Chengguan)

Area
  - Total: 110,154 km^{2} (42,531 sq mi)
- Elevation: 3,240 m (10,630 ft)

Population (2019)
  - Total: 798,067
  - Density: 7.24501/km^{2} (18.7645/sq mi)

GDP
  - Total: CN¥ 27.9 billion US$ 4.3 billion
  - Per capita: CN¥ 36,574; US$ 5,668
- Time zone: UTC+8 (China Standard)
- ISO 3166 code: CN-XZ-03

Qamdo
- "Qamdo" in Chinese characters

Chinese name
- Chinese: 昌都
Transcriptions
Standard Mandarin
- Hanyu Pinyin: Chāngdū

Tibetan name
- Tibetan: ཆབ་མདོ།
Transcriptions
- Wylie: chab mdo
- Tibetan Pinyin: Qamdo

Chamdo, officially Qamdo (Tibetan: ཆབ་མདོ, Wylie: chab mdo, ZWPY: qamdo) and also known in Chinese as Changdu (Chinese: 昌都; pinyin: Chang Du), is a prefecture-level city in the eastern part of the Tibet Autonomous Region, China. Its seat is the town of Chengguan in Karuo District. Chamdo is Tibet's third largest city after Lhasa and Shigatse.

Chamdo is divided into 11 county-level divisions: one district and ten counties. The main district is Karuo District. Other counties include Jonda County, Gonjo County, Riwoche County, Dengqen County, Zhag'yab County, Baxoi County, Zognang County, Maarkam County, Lhorong County, and Banbar County.

== History ==
Wang Qimei and Zhang Guohua led 40,000 People's Liberation Army soldiers in an attack against the 8,000 soldiers of the Tibetan Army defending Chamdo on 7 October 1950. Over 5,700 Tibetans died after fighting 21 battles by 19 October, and Provincial Governor Ngapoi Ngawang Jigme was captured. The fall of Chamdo resulted in the Tibetan government submitting to China's demands.

On 11 July 2014 Chamdo Prefecture was upgraded into a prefecture-level city.

== Languages ==
Languages spoken in Chamdo include Khams Tibetan and the Chamdo languages of Lamo, Larong, and Drag-yab.

== Transportation ==
From 1951 to 1954, the Chinese army constructed a 2,300 kilometre long highway from Ya'an to Lhasa that went through Chamdo.

== Subdivisions ==
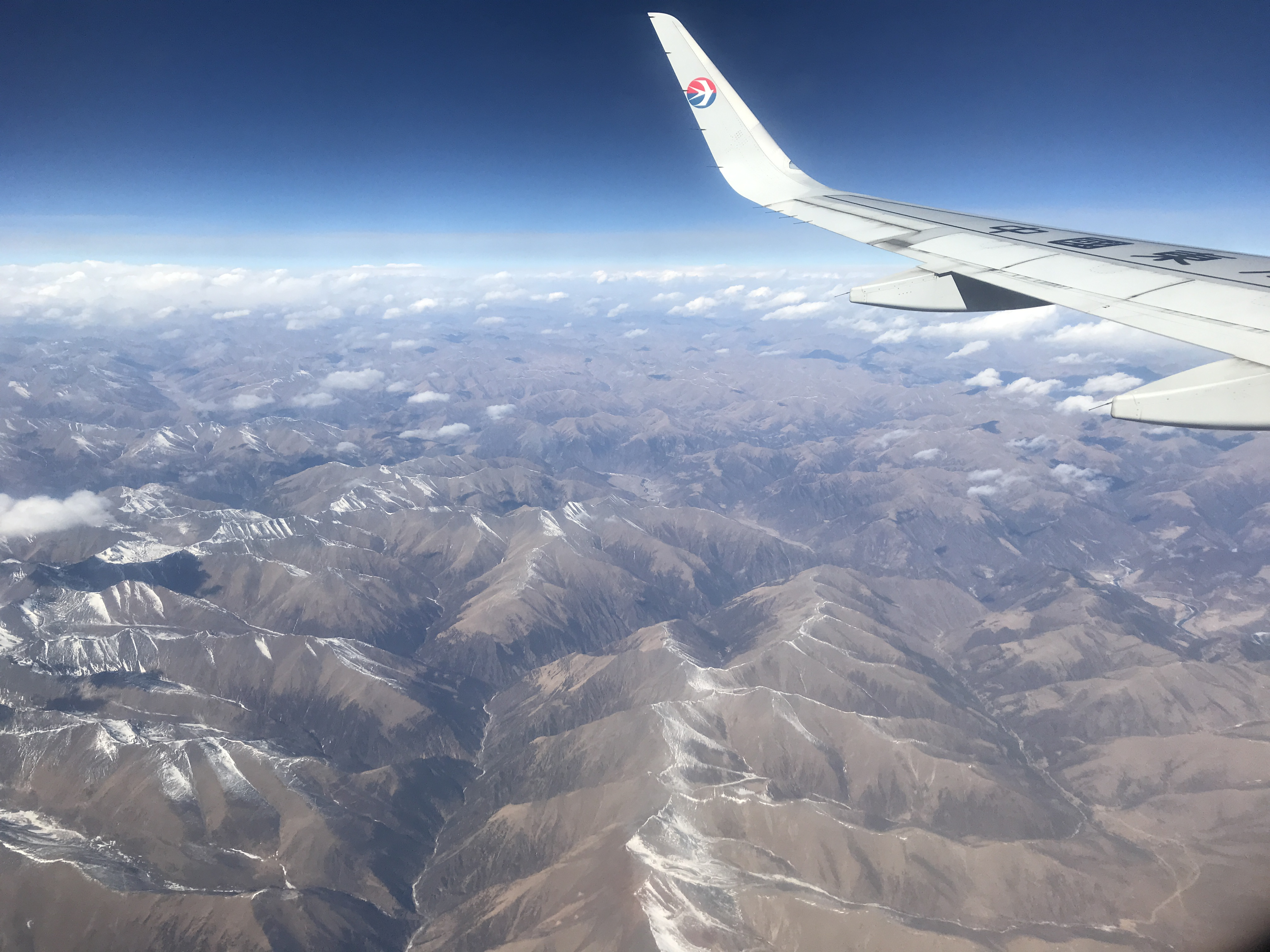
Aerial view of Banbar County, Chamdo.

The city is subdivided into 11 county-level divisions: 1 district and 10 counties.

Map
Name	Hanzi	Hanyu Pinyin	Tibetan	Wylie	Population (2010 Census)	Area (km^{2})	Density (/km^{2})
Karuo District	卡若区	Kǎruò Qū	མཁར་རོ་ཆུས།	mkhar ro chus	116,500	10,794	10.79
Jomda County	江达县	Jiāngdá Xiàn	འཇོ་མདའ་རྫོང་།	'jo mda' rdzong	76,026	13,164	5.77
Gonjo County	贡觉县	Gòngjué Xiàn	གོ་འཇོ་རྫོང་།	go 'jo rdzong	40,434	6,323	6.39
Riwoqê County	类乌齐县	Lèiwūqí Xiàn	རི་བོ་ཆེ་རྫོང་།	ri bo che rdzong	49,870	6,355	7.84
Dêngqên County	丁青县	Dīngqīng Xiàn	སྟེང་ཆེན་རྫོང་།	steng chen rdzong	69,888	12,408	5.63
Zhag'yab County	察雅县	Cháyǎ Xiàn	བྲག་གཡབ་རྫོང་།	brag g-yab rdzong	56,789	8,251	6.88
Baxoi County	八宿县	Bāsù Xiàn	དཔའ་ཤོད་རྫོང་།	dpa' shod rdzong	39,021	12,336	3.16
Zogang County	左贡县	Zuǒgòng Xiàn	མཛོ་སྒང་རྫོང་།	mdzo sgang rdzong	44,320	11,837	3.74
Markam County	芒康县	Mángkāng Xiàn	སྨར་ཁམས་རྫོང་།	smar khams rdzong	81,399	11,576	7.03
Lhorong County	洛隆县	Luòlóng Xiàn	ལྷོ་རོང་རྫོང་།	lho rong rdzong	47,491	8,048	5.90
Banbar County	边坝县	Biānbà Xiàn	དཔལ་འབར་རྫོང་།	dpal 'bar rdzong	35,767	8,774	4.07

== Climate ==
Chamdo has a humid continental climate (Köppen: Dwb) in the Karub District and an alpine subarctic climate (Köppen: Dwc) in other counties.

Climate data for Chamdo (Karuo District), elevation 3,315 m (10,876 ft), (1991–2020 normals, extremes 1981–2010)
Month	Jan	Feb	Mar	Apr	May	Jun	Jul	Aug	Sep	Oct	Nov	Dec	Year
Record high °C (°F)	21.8 (71.2)	21.4 (70.5)	26.1 (79.0)	28.1 (82.6)	29.5 (85.1)	32.7 (90.9)	32.0 (89.6)	30.8 (87.4)	30.5 (86.9)	27.7 (81.9)	22.3 (72.1)	20.2 (68.4)	32.7 (90.9)
Mean daily maximum °C (°F)	8.8 (47.8)	10.7 (51.3)	13.5 (56.3)	16.9 (62.4)	21.0 (69.8)	23.8 (74.8)	24.3 (75.7)	23.9 (75.0)	21.9 (71.4)	17.5 (63.5)	13.2 (55.8)	10.0 (50.0)	17.1 (62.8)
Daily mean °C (°F)	−1.5 (29.3)	1.4 (34.5)	4.8 (40.6)	8.3 (46.9)	12.4 (54.3)	15.6 (60.1)	16.4 (61.5)	15.8 (60.4)	13.4 (56.1)	8.4 (47.1)	2.8 (37.0)	−1.1 (30.0)	8.1 (46.5)
Mean daily minimum °C (°F)	−9.4 (15.1)	−6.4 (20.5)	−2.3 (27.9)	1.7 (35.1)	5.7 (42.3)	9.5 (49.1)	10.9 (51.6)	10.3 (50.5)	7.7 (45.9)	2.1 (35.8)	−4.6 (23.7)	−8.9 (16.0)	1.4 (34.5)
Record low °C (°F)	−19.4 (−2.9)	−17.4 (0.7)	−13.0 (8.6)	−7.7 (18.1)	−4.0 (24.8)	1.1 (34.0)	2.9 (37.2)	1.1 (34.0)	−0.9 (30.4)	−7.0 (19.4)	−13.6 (7.5)	−20.7 (−5.3)	−20.7 (−5.3)
Average precipitation mm (inches)	1.6 (0.06)	4.0 (0.16)	10.5 (0.41)	23.9 (0.94)	42.2 (1.66)	80.7 (3.18)	110.7 (4.36)	102.8 (4.05)	75.2 (2.96)	33.1 (1.30)	4.8 (0.19)	1.3 (0.05)	490.8 (19.32)
Average precipitation days (≥ 0.1 mm)	2.2	3.6	6.3	11.3	13.5	18.6	19.9	18.9	17.0	9.8	2.9	1.3	125.3
Average snowy days	3.9	7.3	11.0	6.9	0.6	0.1	0	0	0.1	2.9	4.8	2.9	40.5
Average relative humidity (%)	34	35	40	47	49	58	65	66	66	58	45	37	50
Mean monthly sunshine hours	204.1	184.8	202.9	201.4	215.1	188.9	190.2	192.6	192.4	199.0	205.0	212.3	2,388.7
Percentage possible sunshine	63	59	54	52	50	45	44	47	53	57	65	68	55
Source: China Meteorological Administration

== See also ==
- List of towns in Tibet by elevation

== Works cited ==
- "Promises and Lies: "The 17-Point Agreement"". The Tibet Journal. 36 (1). Library of Tibetan Works and Archives: 27–45. 2011. JSTOR tibetjournal.36.1.27.
- Ginsburgs, George; Mathos, Michael (1960). "Communist China's Impact on Tibet: The First Decade". Far Eastern Survey. 29 (7). Institute of Pacific Relations: 102–109. doi:10.2307/3024138. JSTOR 3024138.
- Goldstein, Melvyn (1991). "Tibet: After the Fall of Chamdo". The Tibet Journal. 16 (1). Library of Tibetan Works and Archives: 58–95. JSTOR 43302217.
