= Zhag'yab County =

Zhag'yab County 察雅县 • བྲག་གཡབ་རྫོང་།
- County
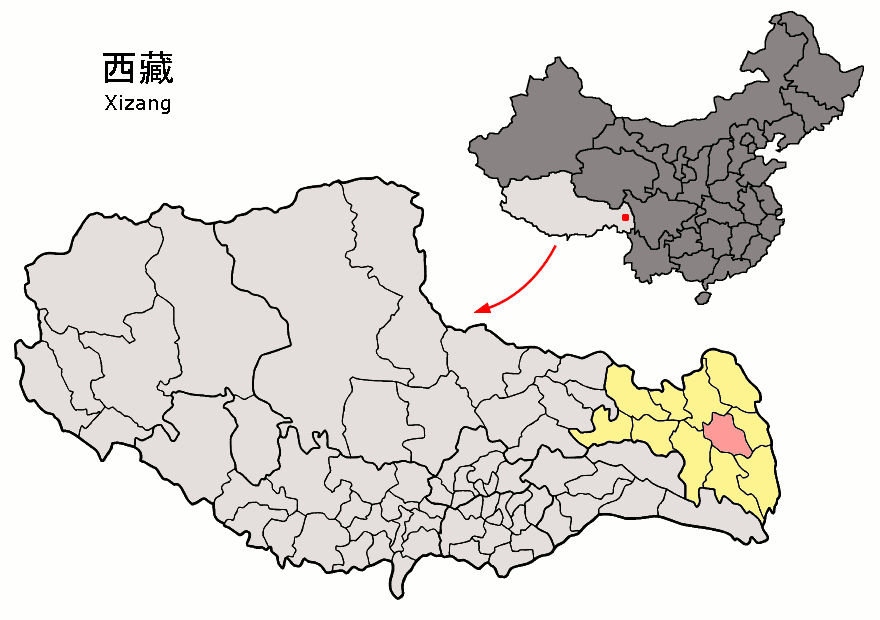
- Location of Zhag'yab County within Tibet

- Location in Tibet Zhag'yab County (China)
- Coordinates: 30°39′22″N 97°34′01″E
- Country: China
- Autonomous region: Tibet
- Prefecture-level city: Chamdo
- County seat: Yêndum

Area
  - Total: 8,255.59 km^{2} (3,187.50 sq mi)

Population (2020)
  - Total: 57,065
  - Density: 6.9123/km^{2} (17.903/sq mi)
- Time zone: UTC+8 (China Standard)
- Website: chaya.changdu.gov.cn

Zhag'yab County

Chinese name
- Simplified Chinese: 察雅县
- Traditional Chinese: 察雅縣
Transcriptions
Standard Mandarin
- Hanyu Pinyin: Cháyǎ Xiàn

Tibetan name
- Tibetan: བྲག་གཡབ་རྫོང་།
Transcriptions
- Wylie: brag g.yab rdzong
- Tibetan Pinyin: Zhag'yab Zong

Zhag'yab County (Tibetan: བྲག་གཡབ་རྫོང, Wylie: brag g.yab rdzong, THL: drak yap dzong; Chinese: 察雅县; pinyin: Chá yǎ xiàn), also spelled Dragyab, Chagyab, Draya, and Chaya, is a county of the Chamdo Prefecture in the Tibet Autonomous Region, China.

== Administrative divisions ==
Zhag'yab County is divided in 3 towns and 10 townships.

Name	Chinese	Hanyu Pinyin	Tibetan	Wylie
Towns
Yêndum Town	烟多镇	Yānduō zhèn	དབྱེན་འདུམ་གྲོང་རྡལ།	dbyen 'dum grong rdal
Jamdün Town	香堆镇	Xiāngduī zhèn	བྱངས་མདུན་གྲོང་རྡལ།	byangs mdun grong rdal
Gyithang Town	吉塘镇	Jítáng zhèn	དཀྱིལ་ཐང་གྲོང་རྡལ།	dkyil thang grong rdal
Townships
Zangsar Township	宗沙乡	Zōngshā xiāng	གཙང་གསར་ཤང་།	gtsang gsar shang
Kargong Township	卡贡乡	Kǎgòng xiāng	མཁར་སྒང་ཤང་།	mkhar sgang shang
Rangzhub Township	荣周乡	Róngzhōu xiāng	རང་གྲུང་ཤང་།	rang grung shang
Pelri Township	巴日乡	Bārì xiāng	དཔལ་རི་ཤང་།	dpal ri shang
Acur Township	阿孜乡	Ãzī xiāng	ཝ་མཁར་ཤང་།	a tshur shang
Wakhar Township	王卡乡	Wángkǎ xiāng	ཨ་ཚུར་ཤང་།	wa mkhar shang
Shingka Township	新卡乡	Xīnkǎ xiāng	ཤིང་དཀའ་ཤང་།	shin dka' shang
Khentang Township	肯通乡	Kěntōng xiāng	འཁན་ཐང་ཤང་།	'khan thang shang
Korra Township	扩达乡	Kuòdá xiāng	འཁོར་རྭ་ཤང་།	'khor rwa shang
Cala Township (Calamdo)	察拉乡	Chálā xiāng	ཚྭ་ལ་ཤང་།	tswa la shang
