= Kyirong–Syuba language =

Tibetic language

Shyuba
- स्युबा ताम, Syuba Taam, Syuba, Syubaa
- Native to: Nepal, India
- Region: Nepal, Sikkim
- Ethnicity: Syuba
- Native speakers: 5,000 (2011 & 2021 census)
- Language family: Sino-Tibetan: Tibeto-Kanauri (?); Bodish; Tibetic; Southern Tibetic; Shyuba
- Writing system: Tibetan, Devanagari

Official status
- Official language in: Nepal India: Sikkim (additional)

Language codes
- ISO 639-3: xsr
- Glottolog: sher1255

Syuba (also Syubaa, Shyuba, or Xiuba) is a Tibetic language spoken in Nepal and the Indian state of Sikkim, mainly by the Syuba. The majority speakers of the Syuba language live in the Ramechhap region of Nepal, spanning from the Chinese (Tibetan) border in the east to the Bhotekosi River in the west. About 5,000 speakers live in Nepal. Syuba is predominantly a spoken language, although it is occasionally written using either the Devanagari or Tibetan script.
