= Gserpa language =

Tibetic language of Sichuan, China

Gserpa
- Native to: China
- Region: Sichuan
- Native speakers: ca. 1000? (2005)
- Language family: Sino-Tibetan: Tibeto-Kanauri ?; Bodish; Tibetic; Gserpa

Language codes
- ISO 639-3: None (mis)
- Glottolog: None

Gserpa (Wylie: gser pa; Chinese: 色尔坝; also Gserskad) is an eastern Tibetic language of Sichuan. It is spoken by a few hundred or thousand people in Sêrba (Tibetan:གསེར་པ་; Wylie: gser pa; Tibetan pinyin: Sêrba; Chinese: 色尔坝; pinyin: Sè'ěrbà) District, Sêrtar County, Sichuan, China and is different from the Amdo Tibetan language, the dominant Tibetan language in the surrounding region.

== Distribution ==
Gserpa is spoken in Shelgrub Township (旭日乡), Yangs’go Township (杨各乡), Sbomda’ Town (翁达镇), and Rgyashod Township (甲学乡) along the lower Gserchu River (色曲河) in eastern Gserthar County (色达县) in Dkarmdzes Prefecture (甘孜州).

The closely related Khalung language, also known as Rdo, Rdoskad, or Khalong, is spoken to the east of the Gserpa area.
