= Naapa language =

Tibetic language spoken in Nepal

Naaba
- Naapa
- Region: Nepal
- Native speakers: 770 (2006)
- Language family: Sino-Tibetan: Tibeto-Kanauri ?; Bodish; Tibetic; Dzongkha–Lhokä; Naaba

Language codes
- ISO 639-3: nao
- Glottolog: naab1241

Naapa (Naaba), or Nawa Sherpa, is a Tibetic language of Nepal (and one village in China) closely related to Dzongkha of Bhutan. Speakers live among Lhomi speakers.
