= Old Tibetan =

Ancient Tibetan language

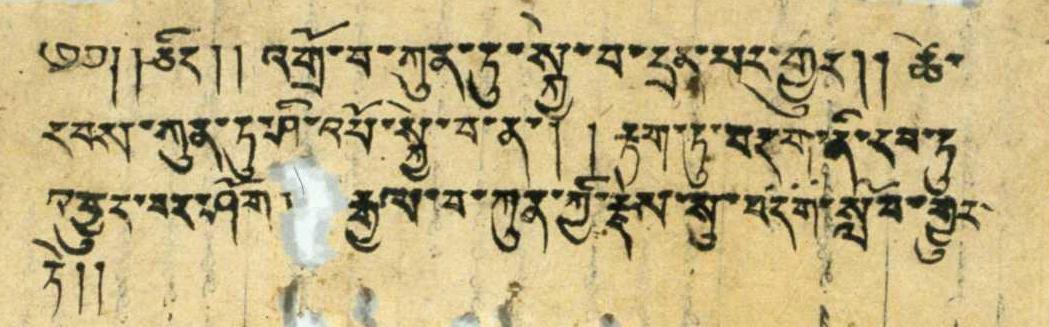
- Region: Tibet
- Era: 7th–9th centuries, after which it became Classical Tibetan
- Language family: Sino-Tibetan: Tibeto-Burman; Tibeto-Kanauri?; Bodish; Tibetic; Old Tibetan
- Writing system: Tibetan script

Language codes
- ISO 639-3: otb
- Glottolog: None

Old Tibetan is the earliest attested form of Tibetan language, reflected in documents from the adoption of writing by the Tibetan Empire in the mid-7th century to the early 9th century. In 816 CE, during the reign of Tibetan King Sadnalegs, literary Tibetan underwent comprehensive standardization, resulting in Classical Tibetan.

== Phonology ==
Old Tibetan is characterised by many features that are lost in Classical Tibetan, including my- rather than m- before the vowels -i- and -e-, the cluster sts- which simplifies to s- in Classical Tibetan, and a reverse form of the vowel letter for i (gi-gu). Aspiration was not phonemic and many words were written indiscriminately with consonants from the aspirated or unaspirated series. Most consonants could be palatalized, and the palatal series from the Tibetan script represents palatalized coronals. The sound conventionally transcribed with the letter འ (Wylie: 'a) was a voiced velar fricative, while the voiceless rhotic and lateral are written with digraphs ཧྲ ⟨hr⟩ and ལྷ ⟨lh⟩. Unlike virtually all modern Tibetan languages, the Old Tibetan orthography did not contain silent letters, and the words were pronounced as written.

The following table is based on Hill's analysis of Old Tibetan:

Consonant phonemes of Old Tibetan
		Labial	Coronal	Dorsal
Nasal		m ⟨མ⟩	n ⟨ན⟩	ŋ ⟨ṅ⟩ ⟨ང⟩
Plosive	voiceless	p ⟨པ⟩	t ⟨ཏ⟩	k ⟨ཀ⟩
Plosive	voiced	b ⟨བ⟩	d ⟨ད⟩	ɡ ⟨ག⟩
Affricate	voiceless		ts ⟨ཙ⟩	
Affricate	voiced		dz ⟨ཛ⟩	
Fricative	voiceless		s ⟨ས⟩	x ~ h ⟨h⟩ ⟨ཧ⟩
Fricative	voiced		z ⟨ཟ⟩	ɣ ~ ɦ ⟨'⟩ ⟨འ⟩
Trill	voiceless		r̥ ⟨hr⟩ ⟨ཧྲ⟩	
Trill	voiced		r ⟨ར⟩	
Approximant	voiceless		l̥ ⟨lh⟩ ⟨ལྷ⟩	
Approximant	voiced	w	l ⟨ལ⟩	j ⟨y⟩ ⟨ཡ⟩

In Old Tibetan, the glide /w/ occurred as a medial, but not as an initial. The Written Tibetan letter ཝ w was originally a digraph representing two Old Tibetan consonants ɦw.

Vowel Phonemes of Old Tibetan

	Front	Central	Back
High	i ི	ɨ ྀ	u ུ
Mid	e ེ		o ོ
Low		a -	

=== Syllable structure ===
In Old Tibetan, syllables can be quite complex with up to three consonants in the onset, two glides, and two coda consonants. This structure can be represented as (C_{1}C_{2})C_{3}(G_{1}G_{2})V(C_{4}C_{5}), with all positions except C_{3} and V optional. This allows for complicated syllables like བསྒྲིགས bsgrigs "arranged" and འདྲྭ 'drwa "web", for which the pronunciations [βzɡriks] and [ɣdrʷa] can be reconstructed.

A voicing contrast only exists in slot C_{3} and spreads to C_{1} and C_{2} so སྒོ sgo "door" would be realized as [zɡo] while སྐུ sku "body" would be [sku]. Final consonants are always voiceless e.g. འཛིནད་ 'dzind [ɣd͡zint] and གཟུགས་ gzugs [gzuks]. The phoneme /b/ in C_{1} was likely realized as [ɸ] (or [β] when C_{3} is voiced) e.g. བསྒྲེ bsgre [βzɡre] and བརྩིས brtsis [ɸrtˢis]. The features of palatalization /i̯/ [Cʲ] and labialization /w/ [Cʷ] can be considered separate phonemes, realized as glides in G_{1} and G_{2} respectively. Only certain consonants are permitted in some syllable slots, as summarized below:

C_{1}	C_{2}	C_{3}	G_{1}	G_{2}	V	C_{4}	C_{5}
b [ɸ]	d^{§} ɡ^{§} b m s r l	all consonants	i̯ r	w	a e i o u ɨ~ø(?)	ɡ d b ŋ n m s ɣ ⟨'⟩ r l	s d

^{§} In C_{2} position, /d/ and /ɡ/ are in complementary distribution: /ɡ/ appears before /t/, /ts/, /d/, /n/, /s/, /z/, /l/, and /l̥/ in C_{3}, while /d/ appears before /k/, /ɡ/, /ŋ/, /p/, /b/, and /m/ in C_{3}. Additionally, /ɡ/ is written ⟨k⟩ before /l̥/.

=== Palatalization ===
Palatalization /Cʲ/ was phonemically distinct from the onset cluster /Cj/. This produces a contrast between གཡ ⟨g.y⟩ /ɡj/ and གྱ ⟨gy⟩ /ɡʲ/, demonstrated by the minimal pair གཡང་ g.yaṅ "sheep" and གྱང་ gyaṅ "also, and". The sounds written with the palatal letters ཅ c, ཇ j, ཉ ny, ཞ zh, and ཤ sh were palatalized counterparts of the phonemic sounds ཙ ts, ཛ dz, ན n, ཟ z, and ས s.

== Morphology ==
=== Nominal ===
Case markers are affixed to entire noun phrases, not to individual words (i.e. Gruppenflexion). Old Tibetan distinguishes the same ten cases as Classical Tibetan:

- absolutive (morphologically unmarked)
- genitive (གི་ -gi, གྱི་ -kyi, ཀྱི་ -gyi, འི་ -'i, ཡི་ -yi)
- agentive (གིས་ -gis, གྱིས་ -kyis, ཀྱིས་ -gyis, ས་ -sa, ཡིས་ -yis)
- locative (ན་ -na)
- allative (ལ་ -la)
- terminative (རུ་ -ru, སུ་ -su, ཏུ་ -tu, དུ་ -du, ར་ -ra)
- comitative (དང་ -dang)
- ablative (ནས་ -nas)
- elative (ལས་ -las)
- comparative (བས་ -bas)

However, whereas the locative, allative, and terminative gradually fell together in Classical Tibetan (and are referred to the indigenous grammatical tradition as the la don bdun), in Old Tibetan these three cases are clearly distinguished. Traditional Tibetan grammarians do not distinguish case markers in this manner, but rather distribute these case morphemes (excluding -dang and -bas) into the eight cases of Sanskrit.

=== Verbal ===
Old Tibetan transitive verbs were inflected for up to four stems, while intransitive verbs only had one or two stems. In the active voice, there was an imperfective stem and a perfective stem, corresponding to the Classical Tibetan present and past stems respectively. Transitive verbs also may have two passive voice stems, a dynamic stem and stative stem. These two stems in turn correspond to the Classical future and imperative stems.

== Personal pronouns ==
Old Tibetan has three first person singular pronouns ང་ ṅa, བདག་ bdag, and ཁོ་བོ་ kho-bo, and three first-person plural pronouns ངེད་ nged, བདག་ཅག་ bdag-cag, and འོ་སྐོལ་ 'o-skol. The second person pronouns include two singulars ཁྱོད་ khyod and ཁྱོ(ན)་འདའ་ khyo(n)-'da' and a plural ཁྱེད་ khyed.

== Orthography ==
Nishi (1993) argues that Tibetan writing was institutionalized at least three times, but the first standardization is poorly understood. He proposes that what scholars usually call Written Tibetan is actually the second standardized writing system, resulting from the second institutionalization (bkas-bcad gnyis-pa). Nishi therefore distinguishes the earlier Old Written Tibetan from Classical Written Tibetan, with the reconstructed phonology usually attributed to Classical Written Tibetan actually reflecting the earlier Old Written Tibetan more closely. Standard orthography has not been altered since then, while the spoken language has changed by, for example, losing complex consonant clusters. As a result, in all modern Tibetan dialects and in particular in the Standard Tibetan of Lhasa, there is a great divergence between current spelling, which still reflects the 9th-century spoken Tibetan, and current pronunciation. This divergence is the basis of an argument in favour of spelling reform, to write Tibetan as it is pronounced; for example, writing Kagyu instead of Bka'-rgyud.

The nomadic Amdo Tibetan and the western dialects of the Ladakhi language, as well as the Balti language, come close to the Old Tibetan spellings. Despite that, the grammar of these dialectical varieties has considerably changed. To write the modern varieties according to the orthography and grammar of Classical Tibetan would be similar to writing Sanskrit orthography. However, many modern Buddhist practitioners in the Indian subcontinent have voiced the position that the classical orthography should not be altered even when used for lay purposes. This has become an obstacle for many modern Tibetic languages wishing to modernize or introduce a new spelling reform of Tibetan.

== See also ==
- Central Tibetan
- Amdo Tibetan
- Lhasa Tibetan
- Khams Tibetan
- Languages of Bhutan
- Sound correspondences between Tibetic languages
