= Khalong Tibetan language =

Tibetic language of Sichuan, China

Khalong Tibetan
- Rdo
- Native to: China
- Region: Sichuan
- Language family: Sino-Tibetan: Tibeto-Kanauri ?; Bodish; Tibetic; Khalong Tibetan

Language codes
- ISO 639-3: None (mis)
- Glottolog: None

Khalong Tibetan (or Khalung; also known as Rdo or Rdoskad) is a Tibetic language of Sichuan, China, once considered a dialect of Khams. It is spoken in Zamtang County of Ngawa Prefecture. Phonological and grammatical details reflect a Showu (Gyarong) substrate.

== Distribution ==
It is spoken at Khalung Village (卡龙村) of Bugrje Township (吾依乡), and Rkamda’ (岗木达), Mesmda’ (明达), and Bragmgo (章光) villages of Rkamda’ Township (岗木达乡) along the lower Rdokhog River (杜科河) of central Dzamthang County (壤塘县) in Rngaba Prefecture (阿坝州). The closely related Gserpa language is spoken just to the west of the Khalong-speaking area.

== Bibliography ==
- T-S. Sun Jackson, 2002. "Perfective stem renovation in Khalong Tibetan", Communication pre'sente'e au 8th Himalayan Symposium, Universite' de Berne, 19–22 September.
