= Stonggnyen Tibetan language =

Tibetic language spoken in Sichuan, China

Stonggnyen Tibetan
- stong gnyen
- Native to: China
- Region: Sichuan
- Language family: Sino-Tibetan: Tibeto-Kanauri ?; Bodish; Tibetic; Stonggnyen Tibetan

Language codes
- ISO 639-3: None (mis)
- Glottolog: None

Stonggnyen Tibetan is a Tibetic language of Sichuan, China. It is unintelligible with other Tibetic varieties spoken in the area.

== Distribution ==
Stonggnyen is spoken in Daocheng County, Sichuan near the border with Yunnan northeast of Diqing. It is spoken in these townships and villages:

- 'Goyagthang Township 俄牙同乡 ('go yag thang)
- Chudkar Town 吉嘎 (chu dkar)
- Gacha Township 各卡乡 (ga cha) (Other villages in the township speak the 'Dab-Gangs dialect of Tibetan.)
  - Bsilbsersgang Village 思子功村 (bsil bser sgang)
  - Gaba Village 各瓦村 (ga ba)

Sun (2026) documents the 'Goyagthang Township 俄牙同乡 variety (Dbang'dzin / dbang 'dzin Village 往子村 in particular).

== Classification ==
Stonggnyen is closely related to Lamdo, a Sems-kyi-nyila Khams Tibetan variety spoken in G.yangmdo Village 浪都村, Skadtshag Township 格咱乡 (skad tshag), Shangri-La City, Yunnan. Lamdo (Langdu) is documented in Suzuki (2010).

According to, Sun (2026), Stonggnyen likely originated in Diqing, since it shares various lexical and phonological features with neighboring Tibetan varieties in Diqing. However, since Stonggnyen also has many unique innovations that are not found in any other Tibetan varieties, Sun (2026) refrains from providing an exact classification for Stonggnyen.
