= Choni language =

Tibetic language spoken in China

Choni
- Thewo-Chone; Cone Tibetan
- Pronunciation: Choni pronunciation: [tɕɔᴸnɛ]
- Native to: China
- Region: Gansu, Sichuan
- Native speakers: 150,000 (2004)
- Language family: Sino-Tibetan: Tibeto-Kanauri ?; Bodish; Tibetic; (Amdo Tibetan); Choni
- Dialects: Thewo; Hbrugchu

Language codes
- ISO 639-3: cda
- Glottolog: chon1285 thew1235 Thewo-smad
- ELP: Choni
- Choni is classified as Definitely Endangered by the UNESCO Atlas of the World's Languages in Danger.

Choni (Jonê) and Thewo are dialects of a Tibetic language spoken in western China in the vicinity of Jonê County.

== Phonology ==
=== Vowels ===
	Front			Central		Back		
	short	long	nasal	short	long	short	long	nasal
Close	i	iː	ĩː	ʉ	ʉː	u	uː	(ũː)
Close	ɪ	ɪː						
Close-mid	e	eː	ẽː			o	oː	õː
Mid				ə				
Open-mid	ɛ					ɔ		
Open	æ			ã	ãː	ɑ	ɑː	

- [ũː] is only attested in a few words with a palatal or alveolo-palatal initial.

=== Consonants ===
		Bilabial	Alveolar		Retroflex	(Alveolo-) Palatal	Velar	Uvular	Glottal
		Bilabial	plain	sibilant	Retroflex	(Alveolo-) Palatal	Velar	Uvular	Glottal
Nasal		m	n			ɲ	ŋ		
Plosive/ Affricate	tenuis	p	t	t͡s	t͡ʂ	t͡ɕ	k	(q)	
Plosive/ Affricate	aspirated	pʰ	tʰ	t͡sʰ	t͡ʂʰ	t͡ɕʰ	kʰ		
Plosive/ Affricate	voiced	b	d	d͡z	d͡ʐ	d͡ʑ	ɡ	(ɢ)	
Plosive/ Affricate	prenasal	ᵐb	ⁿd	ⁿd͡z	ⁿd͡ʐ	ⁿd͡ʑ	ᵑɡ		
Fricative	tenuis		ɬ	s	ʂ	ɕ	x	(χ)	h
Fricative	aspirated			sʰ	ʂʰ	ɕʰ	xʰ		
Fricative	voiced			z	ʐ	ʑ	ɣ	(ʁ)	
Fricative	prenasal			ⁿz	ⁿʐ	ⁿʑ	ᵑɣ		
Approximant			l			j	w		

- Choni has four contrastive aspirated fricatives /sʰ ʂʰ ɕʰ xʰ/, a relatively high number for a rare phonemic distinction.
- A syllable-initial /k/ can be heard as a uvular fricative [χ ʁ] before consonants, assimilating in voicing.
- A syllable-final /k/ can be heard as a uvular stop [q] after /æ ɔ/.
- A syllable-final /ɡ/ can be heard as a uvular stop [ɢ] after /æ ɔ/.
- [ʁ] can also be heard as an allophone of /ɣ/ between /æ/ or /ɔ/ and another vowel.
- [χ] can also be heard as an allophone of /x/ between /æ/ or /ɔ/ and another vowel.

=== Tone ===
Choni has two contrasting tones, which are realized differently on long and short vowels. They are word tones, with predictable realizations on the second syllable of a morpheme.

== Bibliography ==
- Jacques, Guillaume (2011). "A panchronic study of aspirated fricatives, with new evidence from Pumi" (PDF). Lingua. 121 (9): 1518–1538. doi:10.1016/j.lingua.2011.04.003. S2CID 56166344.
- Jacques, Guillaume (April 2012). "A phonological profile of Cone" (PDF). HAL.
