= Zitsadegu language =

Language

Zitsadegu
- Native to: China
- Region: Jiuzhaigou County, Sichuan
- Native speakers: ca. 1000? (2005)
- Language family: Sino-Tibetan: Tibeto-Kanauri ?; Bodish; Tibetic; Zitsadegu

Language codes
- ISO 639-3: None (mis)
- Glottolog: None

Zitsadegu (Zitsa Degu, Chinese: Jiuzhaigou 九寨沟) is a minor eastern Tibetic language of Sichuan spoken by a few hundred or thousand people.
