= Lakha language =

Southern Tibetic language of Bhutan

Lakha
- ལ་ཁ་, la kha
- Region: Bhutan
- Ethnicity: Lap
- Native speakers: (8,000 cited 1993)
- Language family: Sino-Tibetan: Tibeto-Kanauri ?; Bodish; Tibetic; Dzongkha–Lhokä; Lakha
- Writing system: Tibetan script

Language codes
- ISO 639-3: lkh
- Glottolog: lakh1240
- ELP: Lakha

Lakha ("language of the mountain pass", Tibetan: ལ་ཁ་, Wylie: la kha; also called by the endonym Myangkha, "our language", Tibetan: མྱང་ཁ་, Wylie: myang kha) is a Southern Tibetic language spoken by about 8,000 people in Wangdue Phodrang and Trongsa Districts in central Bhutan. Lakha is spoken by descendants of pastoral yakherd communities.

== See also ==
- Languages of Bhutan
