= Drugchu language =

Endangered Tibetic language spoken in China

Drugchu
- Native to: China
- Region: Gansu
- Native speakers: ca. 1000? (2005)
- Language family: Sino-Tibetan: Tibeto-Kanauri ?; Bodish; Tibetic; Drugchu

Language codes
- ISO 639-3: None (mis)
- Glottolog: hbru1241 hbru1242 Hbrugchu

Drugchu (Hbrugchu, Zhugchu) is an endangered Tibetic language of Gansu spoken by a few hundred or thousand people.

== Phonology ==
Consonant phonemes of Drugchu
		Labial	Alveolar	Palatal (-alveolar)	Velar	Glottal
Nasal		m	n			
Plosive/ Affricate	voiceless	p	t	t͡ʃ	k	ʔ
Plosive/ Affricate	voiced	b	d	d͡ʒ	ɡ	
Fricative	voiceless	f	s	ʃ	x	h
Fricative	voiced	v	z	ʒ	ɣ	
Tap			ɾ			
Approximant			l	j		

Vowel phonemes of Drugchu
	Front	Back
Close	iː	uː
Mid	e	o
Open	æ	ɒː
