= Basum language =

Bodish language spoken in Tibet

Basum
- Region: Tibet, China
- Native speakers: (2,500 cited 1989)
- Language family: Sino-Tibetan: Bodish; (unclassified); Basum

Language codes
- ISO 639-3: None (mis)
- Glottolog: basu1243

Basum (autonym: brag gsum 'three cliffs'; Basong 巴松话; Bake) is a divergent Bodish language spoken by about 2,500 people in Gongbo'gyamda County 工布江达县, Nyingtri Prefecture, Tibet, China. Basum is spoken by 13.5% of the population of Gongbo'gyamda County. Glottolog lists Basum as unclassified within Bodish.

Wang (2020) is a grammatical and morphosyntactic description of Basum.

== Background ==
The Basum language is locally known as Bäke (བག་སྐད་), which is derived from brag-gsum skad, meaning ‘the language of the Three Rocks’. There are about 3,000 speakers in Zhoka and Tshongo townships, Gongbo'gyamda County 工布江达县, on the shores of the Basum Lake. Qu, et al. (1989) also reported that Basum is spoken in Cuogao Township 错高乡 and Xueka Township 雪卡乡 of Gongbo'gyamda County 工布江达县, Nyingtri Prefecture, Tibet, China.

== Classification ==
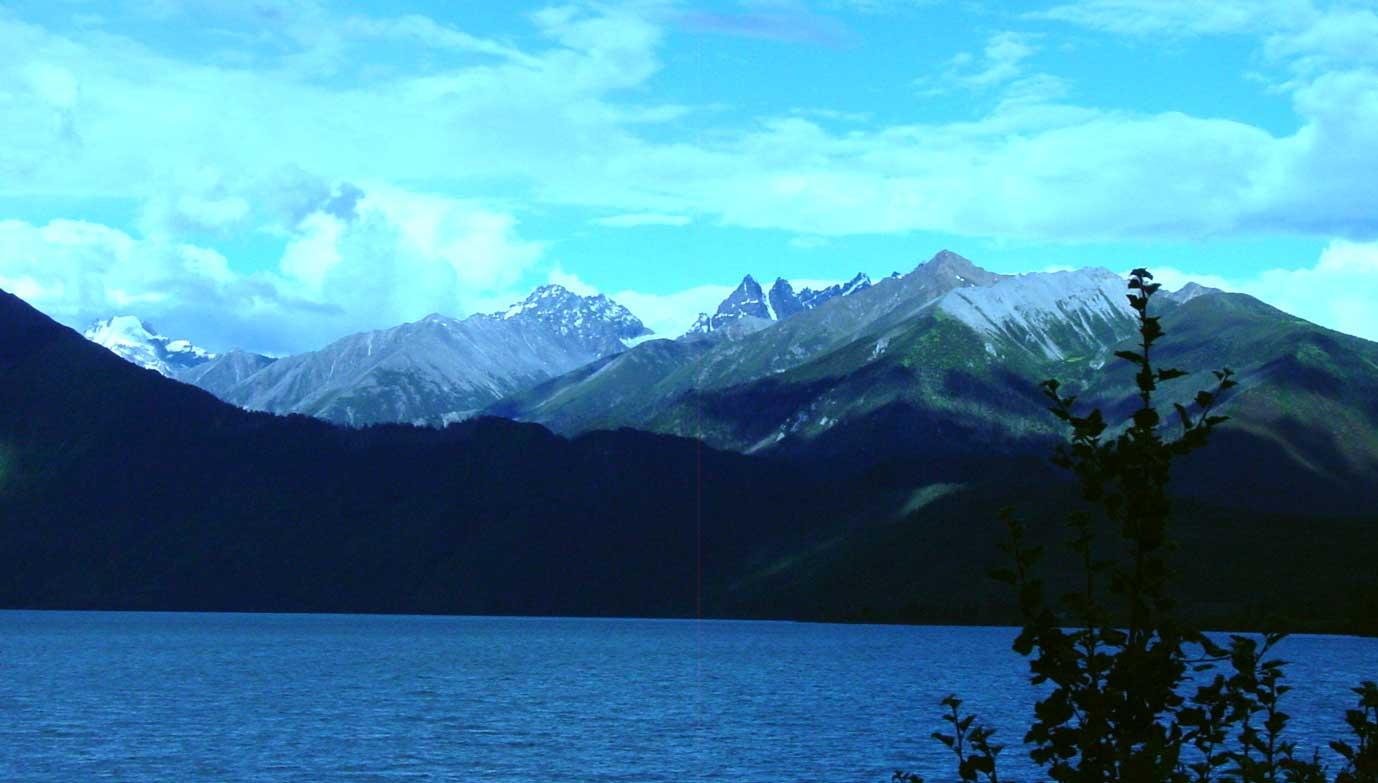
Basum Lake (Basum Tso) in Tibet

Qu, et al. (1989) notes that Basum is mutually unintelligible with and quite different from Gongbu Tibetan (Chinese: 工布话; 11,600 speakers), which is a Central Tibetan language variety closely related to Nyingchi Tibetan (Chinese: 林芝话). Basum is also unintelligible with Niangpu 娘蒲话 (also called Muqu 牧区话), which is a Khams Tibetan language variety spoken by 4,310 people in Jiaxing 加兴 and Niangpu 娘蒲 townships of Gongbo'gyamda County. Qu, et al. (1989:61) notices some lexical similarities between Basum and Cuona Menba (Tawang Monpa), an East Bodish language.

Suzuki & Nyima (2016) consider Basum to be a non-Tibetic language.

Tournadre (2014) classifies Basum (Bake) as an unclassified Bodish language that does not belong to the Tibetic branch. Tournadre (2014: 112) notes that Basum has the negator a-, as opposed to the negator ma- or myi- in Tibetic languages. Also, unlike Tibetic languages, Basum does not palatalize Proto-Bodish *ti- and *si-.

A computational phylogenetic of various languages of Tibet by Jiang (2022) shows that Basum is divergent, and although it shows some similarities with the Medog dialect of Khams Tibetan due to contact, as well as with East Bodish ("Menba" or "Monpa") languages.

Tournadre & Suzuki (2023) suggest that Basum may be related to Dakpa (Tawang Monpa), an East Bodish language, since both languages share many lexical features as well as grammatical morphemes.

== Lexicon ==
Tournadre & Suzuki (2023) lists the following Basum words that have no Tibetic cognates.

Gloss	Basum	Classical Tibetan
seven	ˉniː	bdun
four	ˉpər	bzhi
meat	ˉʔə ȵiː	sha
blood	ˉkɵʔ	khrag
leg	´kiː	rkang
red	´nde nde	dmar
stone	´tɐ luŋ	rdo
I	´ɦi	nga
you	ˉdo	khyed, khyod
he	ˉpho	kho
negation	ˉʔɐ	ma

Qu, et al. (1989: 50–51) list the following Basum words with no cognates in neighboring Tibetic languages.

Chinese gloss	English gloss	Basum
脚	foot, leg	ci¹⁴
酥油	yak butter	ja⁵⁵
盐	salt	npo⁵³
一	one	tɯʔ⁵³
七	seven	ȵi⁵⁵
走	to walk	nõ⁵³
看	to look	ɕẽ⁵³
睡	to sleep	cã¹⁴
坐	to sit	ȵɯ̃⁵⁵
我	I (1.SG)	hi⁵³
你	you (2.SG)	nto¹²
他	he (3.SG)	po⁵³
那	that	ũ⁵³
多	many	pi⁵⁵
红	red	nte¹¹nte⁵³
吝啬	stingy	phe⁵⁵mu⁵³
一点儿	a little, a bit	ɐ⁵⁵mi⁵⁵
立即	soon, quickly	a¹¹lu⁵³
全部	all	nta¹¹le¹⁵
根本	basically	ɐ¹¹nɐʔ⁵³
一定	definitely, must	sɯ̃¹¹pa⁵³

Other divergent Basum words are (Suzuki & Nyima 2016):

Gloss	Basum
one	tɨʔ
four	bər
five	ŋo
seven	ni
you (sg)	do
blood	køʔ
meat	aȵi
iron	l̥ɐʔ
pig	pɐʔ

Several hundred Basum lexical items are also documented in Qu & Jing (2017), a comparative survey of Central Tibetan lects.
