= Groma language =

Tibetic language spoken in China, Bhutan and India

Groma
- Tromowa
- Native to: China, Bhutan and India
- Region: Chumbi Valley region between Sikkim and Bhutan
- Native speakers: (27,000 cited 1993–2007)
- Language family: Sino-Tibetan: Tibeto-Kanauri ?; Bodish; Tibetic; Dzongkha–Lhokä; Groma

Language codes
- ISO 639-3: gro
- Glottolog: grom1238

Groma, also known as Tromowa and J'umowa, is a language spoken primarily in the lower Chumbi Valley in Tibet, with some speakers in Sikkim in India. It belongs to the southern group of Tibetan languages. Its speakers identify as Tibetans.
