= Dongwang Tibetan language =

Tibetic language of Yunnan, China

Dongwang Tibetan
- Tongwa Tibetan
- tõ⁵⁵wã⁵³/tõ⁵⁵wã⁵³ rũ¹¹
- Native to: China
- Region: Eastern Shangri-La, Diqing, Yunnan
- Native speakers: 6,000 (2005)
- Language family: Sino-Tibetan: Tibeto-Kanauri ?; Bodish; Tibetic; Khams; Dongwang Tibetan

Language codes
- ISO 639-3: None (mis)
- Glottolog: None

Dongwang Tibetan is a Tibetic language of Yunnan, China, once considered a dialect of Khams. It is spoken in the eastern part of Shangri-La County, along the Dongwang River, by about 6,000 people.

== Bibliography ==
- Ellen Bartee, 2007. A grammar of Dongwang Tibetan.
