= MDungnag language =

Tibetic language of Gansu, China

mDungnag Tibetan
- Dongna
- Native to: China
- Region: Gansu
- Language family: Sino-Tibetan: Tibeto-Kanauri ?; Bodish; Tibetic; mDungnag Tibetan

Language codes
- ISO 639-3: None (mis)
- Glottolog: None

mDungnag Tibetan (or mDung-nag; also known as Dongna 东纳话) is a divergent Tibetic language of western Gansu, China.

== Distribution ==
mDungnag is spoken in Qifeng Tibetan Ethnic Township (祁丰藏族乡), Sunan Yugur Autonomous County, Gansu, China.

== Classification ==
Shao (2018) notes that mDungnag is not mutually intelligible with either Khams Tibetan or Amdo Tibetan. It may possibly be a divergent form of Amdo Tibetan due to some shared vocabulary, although these similarities could also be due to contact. The exact classification of mDungnag within Tibetic remains uncertain.

== Phonology ==
mDungnag is a non-tonal language.

== Dialects ==
mDungnag can be divided into two dialects:

- Hexi 河西 ("West River"): spoken in Baozitan Village 堡子滩村
- Hedong 河东 ("East River"): spoken in Qingkedi Village 青稞地村 and Ciyaokou 瓷窑口村 Village. This is the dialect that is primarily documented in Shao (2018).

Some lexical differences between the Hexi and Hedong dialects include the following. Translated English glosses have also been provided to supplement the original Chinese glosses from Shao (2018).

Chinese gloss	English gloss	Hexi	Hedong
乌鸦	crow (bird)	kʰɐtʰɐ	hɐtʰɐ
黄羊	Mongolian gazelle	ʱgʷɐ	ʱgo
旱獭	marmot	ʂʮ	ʂʷa
开水	boiling water	tʂʰənkʰo	tʂʰəkʰo
大坂	large mountain	lʷɐ	lɐ
红嘴鸦	Red-billed chough	ʰtʂoŋχʷa	ʰtʂoŋhɐ
馒头	mantou (steamed bun)	kɔrɐ	kʷɐrɐ
骆驼	camel	ʱŋɐmaŋ	ʱŋɐməŋ
白胸黑狗	white-chested black dog	taŋkʰar	taŋɣar
踩	to step on	ʱdə	ʱdi
耕地	to plow, till	ʰtʂɐk	ʱmi (perfective; imperative); ʱmɔ (imperfective)
穿	to wear	kon	kʷan
骑	to ride	ʂon	ʂʷan
点火	to ignite, light (fire)	ʱdʑon	ʱdʑʷan
吵	to quarrel	kʰon	kʰʷan
使役/使用	to use	kʰɔ	ko
疼痛	pain	ʱdzer	zer
舀	to scoop	ʰtʂʷi (perfective; imperative); tʂʮ (imperfective)	sʷi (perfective; imperative); sʮ (imperfective)
数字连词	numeral affix	sɔ	ʰtsɐ
棉袄	cotton jacket	tʂyɣɔtsə	orə
杏子	apricot	ɣorək	xaŋrə
山羊羔子	kid (of mountain goat)	eᶳtsə	rəᶳtsə
帽子	hat	ⁿgɔʂɐ	kɐli
两口子	married couple	ʱdzɐwɐ	ʱdzɐⁿgɔ
头面	face; woman's head ornaments	ʰtəkgʷɔ	ʰtəkdʑap
