= Baima language =

Endangered Sino-Tibetan language of China

Baima
- Pe
- 白马语
- Pronunciation: /pe˥˧/
- Native to: China
- Region: Sichuan and Gansu
- Ethnicity: 14,000 Baima people (2007)
- Native speakers: 10,000 (2007)
- Language family: Sino-Tibetan: Tibetic ? Qiangic ?; Baima
- Dialects: Northern Baima, Southern Baima, Western Baima

Language codes
- ISO 639-3: bqh
- Glottolog: baim1244
- ELP: Baima
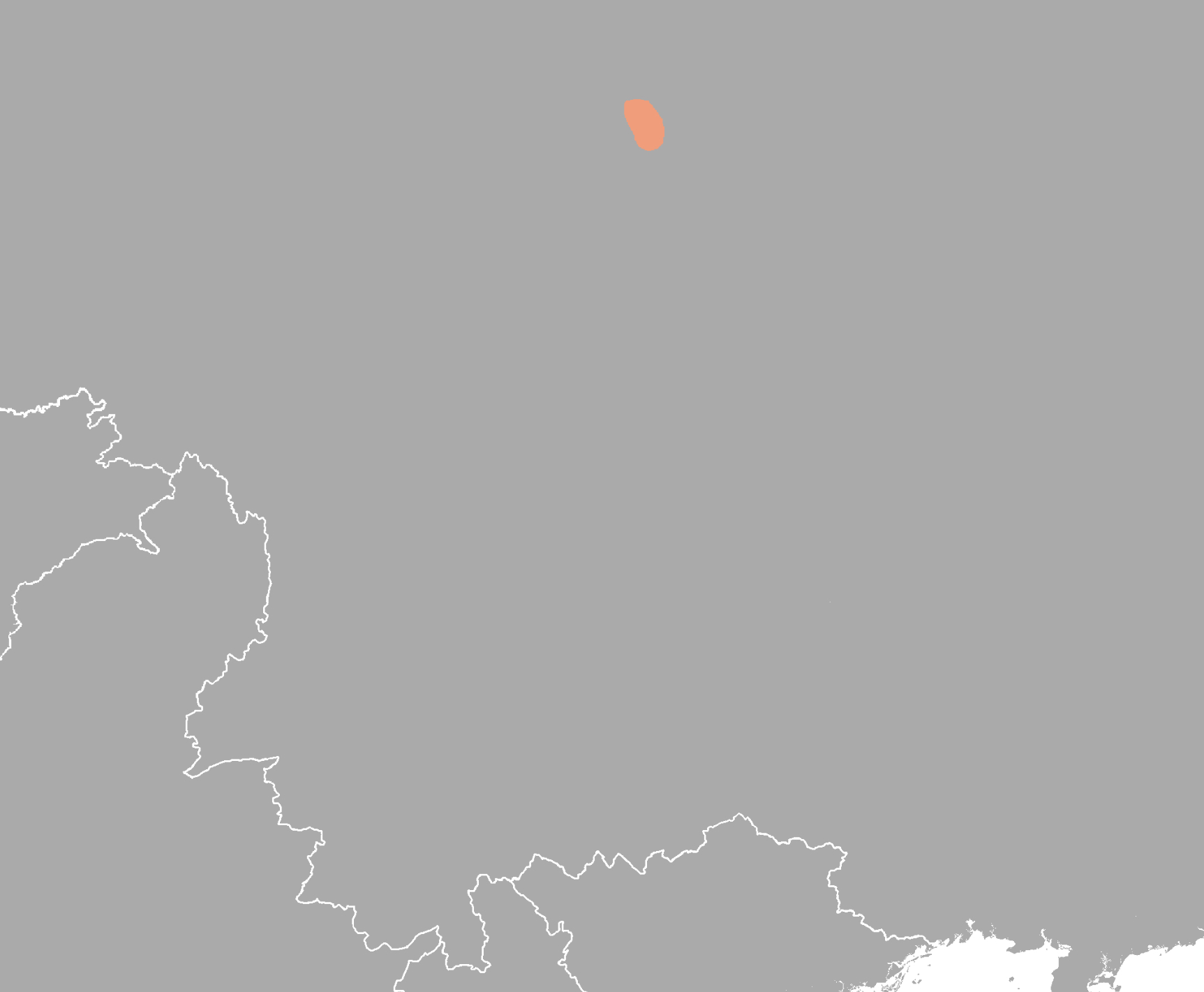

- Baima is classified as Vulnerable by the UNESCO Atlas of the World's Languages in Danger.

Baima (autonym: Pe; Baima pronunciation: [pe˥˧]) is a language spoken by 10,000 Baima people, in north-central Sichuan Province and Gansu Province, China. Baima is passed on from parents to children in Baima villages. It is spoken within the home domain and is not used in any media of mass communication.

Baima uses subject–object–verb (SOV) word order, word-initial consonant clusters and is tonal. It is unclassified within Sino-Tibetan; there are multiple layers of borrowings from Amdo, Khams, and Zhongu Tibetan, as well as lexical and grammatical connections with Qiangic languages. Basic vocabulary is about 85% Tibetic and 15% Qiangic, and the Tibetic words do not link to any established group of Tibetic languages. Chirkova (2008) suggests that the Qiangic vocabulary "might be a retention from the language originally spoken by the Báimǎ before their shift to a form of Tibetic in the 7th century." She accepts Baima as Tibetan, but as an isolate within the Tibetic languages.

== Geographic distribution ==
According to the Endangered Languages Project, the Baima language is spoken in four counties: Jiuzhaigou County, Songpan County, Pingwu County, and Wen County.

Baima is spoken in Wujiao in Jiuzhaigou County.

Baima is spoken in Baima Tibetan Ethnic Township (Chinese: 白马藏族乡) in Pingwu County.

Within Wen County, Baima is spoken in Tielou Tibetan Ethnic Township.

== Dialects ==
There are distinctions within the Baima language itself. Baima is mainly divided into three dialect groups: Southern Baima (Pingwu Baima), Northern Baima (Wenxian Baima), Western Baima (Jiuzhaigou Baima, Songpan Baima). The Baima spoken in Jiuzhaigou and surrounding areas differs from that spoken in Songpan County in the Aba Tibetan-Qiang Autonomous Prefecture and Wenxian County in Gansu Province.

Sun Hongkai, et al. (2007) document the following three dialects of Baima.

- Pingwu County, Sichuan
- Tielou Tibetan Ethnic Township (铁楼藏族乡), Wen County, Gansu
- Wujiao (Chinese: 勿角镇), Jiuzhaigou County, Sichuan

== Classification ==
The classification of Baima has caused controversy among linguists. Baima is provisionally classified with the Khams group, although it also has a number of Amdo characteristics. Reasons for this are presumably the drastic simplification of the syllable structure, the elimination of ancient Tibetan syllables codas and the presence of tones. While many scholars (Song Hongkai, Nishida Tatsuo, and Katia Chirkova) believe that Baima is a separate Tibeto-Burman subgroup in its own right, others believe that it should be identified as a Tibetan dialect. In fact, the differences between Baima and Tibetan far exceeded those existing between the three main Tibetan dialects spoken within Chinese territory.

=== Decline due to classification ===
Although the Baima people have sought after their claims as an independent ethnic group since the 1960s, the Baima language remained classified as a Tibetan dialect. As such, their ethnic minority rights are "hostile taken over" by the Tibetans and the Lhasa Tibetan language. As Chirkova noted, "Reclassification of ethnic groups listed as Tibetans remains a sensitive issue in the PRC, and is considered by many Tibetans as an attack on Tibetan identity by the Chinese government." As a result, the Baima language remains poorly documented to this day and continues to raise the question of language in the role of cultural survival. The use of Baima is limited to religious ceremonies and intercommunication between Baima villages, which significantly furthered the endangerment of Baima language. Additionally, the language of communication with neighboring communities throughout all Baima-inhabited areas is Sichuan Mandarin.

== History ==
Baima speakers number around 10,000 and have lived for generations in the mountainous region spanning the borders of Sichuan and Gansu Provinces. After the establishment of the People's Republic of China in 1949, Baima speakers have requested to grant them recognition as an independent ethnic group on many occasions. Historians believe that the Baima are descendants of the ancient Di people in China. Tibetans invaded the Di territory in the 7th century and assimilated the local population, which probably subsequently shifted into a form of Tibetan spoken by the invaders. Linguists consider Baima to be an independent language of the Tibetan branch but the language itself has been greatly influenced by Tibetan. In addition, DNA specialists have discovered that the Baima are genetically closer to the Qiang people than to the Tibetans.

== Phonology ==
Baima is noted for its phonological complexity, and for a number of features that are typologically uncommon. Huang & Zhang (1995) argued that the order of the changes that induced tones in Baima are reversed from typical tonal Tibetic languages.

Baima consonants
| | | Bilabial | Alveolar | | Post- alveolar | (Alveolo-) palatal | Retroflex | Velar |
| | | Bilabial | plain | sibilant | Post- alveolar | (Alveolo-) palatal | Retroflex | Velar |
|---|---|---|---|---|---|---|---|---|
| Nasal | plain | m | n | | | ɲ | | ŋ |
| Nasal | epiglottal | m𐞴 | n𐞴 | | | ɲ𐞴 | | ŋ𐞴 |
| Plosive/ Affricate | tenuis | p | t | ts | tʃ | tɕ | ʈɽ̝̊ | k |
| Plosive/ Affricate | aspirated | pʰ | tʰ | tsʰ | tʃʰ | tɕʰ | ʈɽ̝̊ʰ | kʰ |
| Plosive/ Affricate | voiced | b | d | dz | dʒ | dʑ | ɖɽ̝ | ɡ |
| Plosive/ Affricate | prenasal | ᵐb | ⁿd | ⁿdz | | ᶮdʑ | ᶯɖɽ̝ | ᵑɡ |
| Plosive/ Affricate | epiglottal | ᵐb𐞴 | | ⁿdz𐞴 | ⁿdʒ𐞴 | ᶮdʑ𐞴 | | ᵑɡ𐞴 |
| Fricative | tenuis | | | s | ʃ | ɕ | | x |
| Fricative | aspirated | | | sʰ | ʃʰ | ɕʰ | | |
| Fricative | voiced | | | z | ʒ | ʑ | | ɣ |
| Approximant | plain | w | l | | | j | | |
| Approximant | epiglottal | | l𐞴 | | | j𐞴 | | |
| Trill | | | r | | | | | |

Baima vowels
| | Front | Central | | Back |
|---|---|---|---|---|
| Close | i | ʉ | ʊ | |
| Near-close | e | | | u |
| Mid | | ə | ɞ | o |
| Open-mid | ɛ | | ɑ | |
| Open | | ä | | |
| Diphthong | iɛ yʉ uɛ uä | | | |

The phonology of Baima is very similar to that of the Khams Tibetan language. They have both retained a voiced–voiceless contrast and have 4–5 contrastive tones as opposed to Amdo dialect.

The diphthong /uä/ is non-native and only occurs in loan words from Mandarin Chinese.

Affricates: four sets of affricates exist in the Baima language. They are alveolar, palato-alveolar, alveolo-palatal, and retroflex.

Rhymes: Baima rhymes are very similar to the Khams Tibetan language but its vowel system is much more complex. Codas have essentially been lost and vowels show considerable differentiation, with the appearance of many back diphthongs. In general, the number of tones in Baima is also similar to Khams Tibetan. However, the correspondences between Baima tones, onsets, and rhymes with written Tibetan are not as clear as those between Khams Tibetan and written Tibetan.

== Vocabulary ==
Overall, Baima vocabulary is highly heterogeneous. It consists predominantly of transparent Tibetan provenance and appears to combine features of Khams and Amdo. However, sound correspondences between the sound system of ancient Tibetan, as reflected in standard Written Tibetan orthography and Baima, are less regular than those between Written Tibetan orthography and established groups of Modern Tibetan dialects. Baima vocabulary also exhibits two features that are not present in all other dialects: first, voicing of voiceless aspirated stops and affricates after nasal prefixes; and second, the treatment of written Tibetan orthography. Furthermore, Baima has some words that are of unclear etymology, even in its basic vocabulary. The proportion of these words has never been estimated, nor has basic vocabulary ever been the topic of detailed investigation.

In Ekaterina Chirkova's article, "On the Position of Baima within Tibetan: A Look from Basic Vocabulary", she examined the 100-word Swadesh list for Baima, as the layer of lexicon which is arguably least resistible to change and which therefore can shed light on the genetic affiliation of this language. She then discovered that the 100-word Swadesh list for Báimǎ contains 84 words of Tibetan origin, 15 words of unclear origin and another 7 words with partial cognation, in which one element is of unidentified origin. Four words are doublets, most of which combine one word of unclear origin with a word of Tibetan origin. According to her analysis, Baima has a simple syllable structure. All Baima syllables are open an have the (n)(C)V makeup, where "n" stands for prenasalization and is homorganic with the following consonant. Most Baima verbs have two stems, the imperfective, marked by prenasalization and mostly the high falling tone, and the perfective/imperative, marked by the high rising tone. Baima verbs have directional aspect, with different prefixes combining with verbs to represent progression of an action in a specific direction. Using prefixes to show directional aspect is an important and unique feature in Baima language. In sum, Chirkova concluded that Baima diverge significantly in lexicon and phonology from the established groups of Tibetan dialects.

== Grammar ==
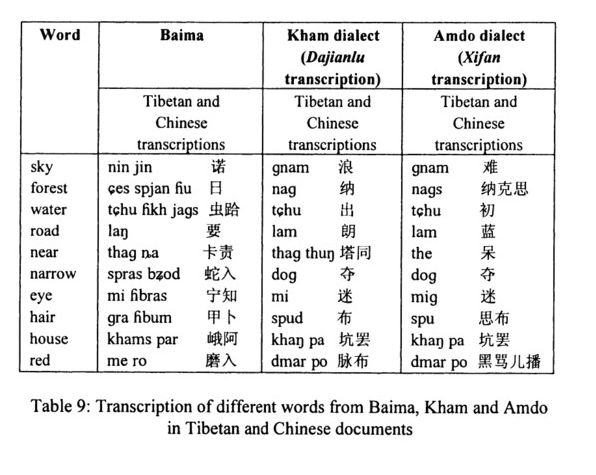
Transcriptions of different words from Baima, Kham, and Amdo in Tibetan and Chinese documents by Song Hongkai

- Baima dual and plural pronouns for the first person have inclusive an exclusive forms. Baima singular personal pronouns have nominative accusative forms, which are expressed by inflectional changes in the vowels. The forms of Baima pronouns for the third person, whether singular, dual, or plural, are very different from those in the Tibetan dialects.
- In comparison to Tibetan, Baima has many more classifiers. Among the over 3,000 common lexical items included in A Study of the Baima lexicon transcribed in Tibetan and Chinese, there were over 110 specific or loan classifiers. For instance, in Baima, there are many different words for the numeral "one" which can combine with classifiers and the reason for it is unclear. An increasing number of classifiers also led to an increase in their function in Baima grammar, while the ways in which they are used are also changing.
- Directionality is an important grammatical feature in Baima.
- Baima has a large number of case-marking articles, which perform very important syntactic functions.
