= Tsk =

Tsk or TSK may refer to:

== Language ==
- "tsk!", a dental click
- Tseku language (ISO 639:tsk), a language of Tibet

== Arts and media ==
- Tsk Tsk Tsk, an Australian music, art and performance group
- Thaanaa Serndha Koottam, a 2018 Indian Tamil-language crime comedy film by Vignesh Shivan
- "TSK", a song by Nas from Magic 3, 2023
- San-in Chūō Television Broadcasting, a Japanese TV station

== Science and technology ==
- Galoter process, shale oil extraction technology
- Takagi-Sugeno-Kang, a system of Fuzzy logic
- Terrace step kink, a model to describe the thermodynamics of crystal surface formation
- The Sleuth Kit, computer forensics tools
- Transmission security keys

== Other uses ==
- Tiger Schulmann's Karate
- Tomsk Avia (ICAO: TSK), a Russian airline
- Turkish Armed Forces (Turkish: Türk Silahlı Kuvvetleri)
