= Walung =

Walung may refer to:

- Walung, Federated States of Micronesia, a village
- Walung people, an ethnic group of Tibetan descendants in Nepal
  - Walungge language, the language of Walung people
  - Olangchung Gola, main settlement of Walung people
