= Walung people =

Ethnic group of Tibetan descendants in Nepal

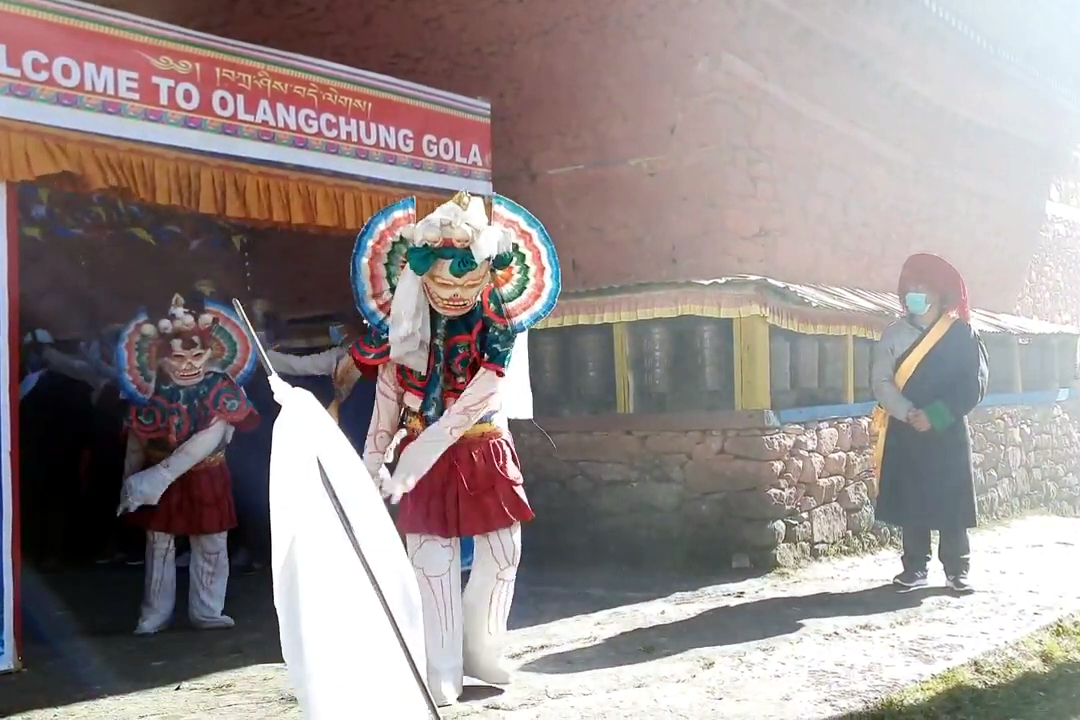
- Futuk festival celebration

Total population
- 24,300 (2020)

Regions with significant populations
- Taplejung District, Kathmandu, Darjeeling, New York

Languages
- Walungge language, Tibetan

Religion
- Tibetan Buddhism

Related ethnic groups
- Tibetan people

The Walung people (also Walung-ngas, Walungpa) are the indigenous inhabitants of the region around Olangchung Gola. They are descended from Tibetan settlers from the 7th century. The primary occupation of the Walung people is trade and herding yaks and dzos. The Walung have resided in Nepal for a long time, but exactly how long is unknown. Estimates range from 1,300 years to just a few centuries. In the oldest recorded study conducted in the area in 1855, Joseph Hooker reported that the Walung had been there for centuries or longer.

== Culture ==
Walung people practice Nyingmapa Buddhism. A large monastery, Deki Chholing Gompa, was built 450 years ago sits on top of the main village of Olangchung Gola. The chief deity at the monastery is Chenrezi (Avalokiteśvara). The Walung people revere the monastery as their shelter from anything untoward. Historically, they would also invite Tibetan monks from Lhasa to provide teaching in this monastery. Losar (Tibetan New Year) and Futuk are the main festivals, which the people celebrate with full pomp and show. Losar celebrates the Tibetan New Year. Futuk reenacts a historical local battle.

== Language ==
Walungge
- Native to: Nepal, China
- Region: Province No. 1, Tibet
- Native speakers: 4,500 (2019)
- Language family: Sino-Tibetan: Bodish; Tibetic; South-Western Tibetic; WDT Bhote; Walungge
- Writing system: None

Language codes
- ISO 639-3: ola
- Glottolog: walu1241 Walungge

The language spoken by the Walung people is the Walungge language, similar to the dialect of the Dinggyê County, Tibet and has 71% lexical similarity with the Lhasa Tibetan. Clark (2019) places it in a group which he calls "WDT Bhote", where the three varieties are Walungge, Thudam, and Dhokpya (Thokpya, Tokpegola). The speakers of these varieties reside in Taplejung and Sankhuwasabha in Province No. 1, Nepal, although some speakers reported areas outside of those districts, including in Tibet, where the language is also spoken. These claims have not been investigated. There is a lack of connection between the various villages, especially regarding language names. Clark (2019) received a variety of names when asking the question "what are the names for your language and people group?", and states that many Walung use "Sherpa" to identify both, along with "Bhote". When asking "Do any groups of villages speak the same way [as yours]?", Clark received varying answers from his four sites, where each indicated Walung, Walung indicated Yangma (which was not one of the study sites) and Tibet, and Ghunsa indicated all four study sites.

=== Other Names ===
Walungge has also been known as Walungge Keccya, Halungge, Walongchung Gola, and Walunggi. The suffix -ge or -ke is the Tibetan word for language.

=== Classification ===
The Tibetic languages as a whole are an area of conflict for the linguistic community, largely due to the complexity of the continuum of dialects that makes up the branch. Nicolas Tournadre (2014) places Walungge and Dhokpya (he calls it Tokpe Gola) under his South-Western Tibetic branch. The WDT Bhote languages are not usually the targets of study.
