= Zhongu Tibetan language =

Tibetic language spoken in Sichuan, China

Zhongu Tibetan
- gzhung.khog
- Native to: China
- Region: Sichuan
- Language family: Sino-Tibetan: Tibeto-Kanauri ?; Bodish; Tibetic; Zhongu Tibetan

Language codes
- ISO 639-3: None (mis)
- Glottolog: zhon1235

Zhongu (Zhonggu) Tibetan is a Tibetic language of Sichuan, China, once considered a dialect of Khams. It is spoken in Songpan County.

== Bibliography ==
- T-S. Sun Jackson, 2003. "Phonological profile of Zhongu: a new Tibetan dialect of Northern Sichuan". Language and Linguistics, 4/4, 769–836.
