= Rolled R =

Rolled r or rolling r refers to consonant sounds pronounced with a vibrating tongue:

- Alveolar trill, a consonant written as ⟨r⟩ in the International Phonetic Alphabet
- Alveolar flap, a consonant written as ⟨ɾ⟩ in the International Phonetic Alphabet
- Retroflex trill, a consonant written as ⟨ɽ͡r⟩ in the International Phonetic Alphabet
