= Tseku language =

Tibetic language of Tibet

Tseku
- Native to: China
- Region: Tibet
- Native speakers: (19,000 cited ca. 2000)
- Language family: Sino-Tibetan: Tibeto-Kanauri ?; Bodish; Tibetic; (Khams Tibetan); Tseku

Language codes
- ISO 639-3: tsk
- Glottolog: tsek1238

Tseku (Tzuku) is a Tibetic language of Tibet. Tournadre (2013) classifies it with Khams Tibetan.
