= Baima people =

Tibetan ethnic group

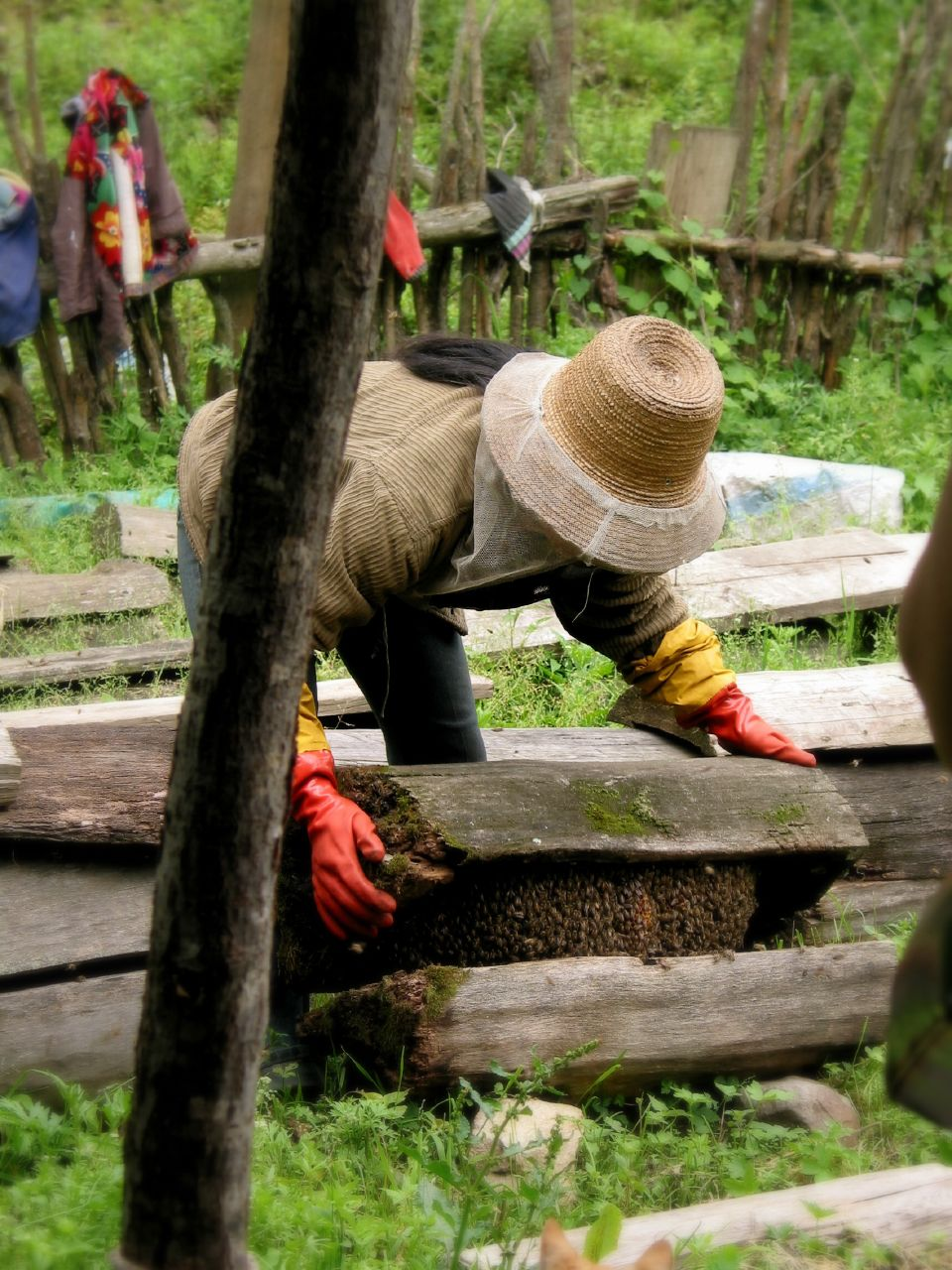
- "Baima": traditional honey making in Sichuan

Total population
- 15,000

Regions with significant populations
- Wen County of Gansu Province, Pingwu County and Jiuzhaigou County of Sichuan Province, China

Languages
- Baima language

Religion
- Tibetan Buddhism

Related ethnic groups
- Tibetan, Qiang, Di

The Baima people (simplified Chinese: 白马人; traditional Chinese: 白馬人; pinyin: Báimǎ rén; lit. 'White Horse people'), also called Baima Tibetans (simplified Chinese: 白马藏人; traditional Chinese: 白馬藏人; pinyin: Báimǎ Zàngrén), are classified by the Chinese government as a subgroup of Tibetans living in the southeast of Gansu and the northwest of Sichuan in China, especially in Pingwu and Jiuzhaigou Counties of Sichuan and Wen County, Gansu. The official classification of the Baima within the larger Tibetan nationality was resisted by the Baima. They demanded to be recognized as a separate nationality, but their claim was rejected.

Like the Songpan people of Tibet, Baima people call themselves Bai. Unlike Standard Tibetan, the Baima language does not use a written script, although a hieroglyphic system is used in religious practice. In religion, they still keep ancient nature worship and totem worship, which practices were later influenced by Bon, and in some degree they also believe Buddhism and Daoism, but there are no temples or lamas (monks). To many of the Baima, the Mountain God is the highest god. The most important religious event for them is the Caogai Dance (曹蓋, which means domino in Baima).

The Baima people are said to be the descendants of Baima Di (白馬氐) and after Songtsen Gampo established the Tibetan Empire, they gradually became part of the Tibetan people. The Di (氐) were an ancient large ethnic group living in west China who were associated with the Qiang (羌), also called Di Qiang (氐羌). The change from their original Di language to Amdo Tibetan probably took place in the 7th century AD. The area Baima people live in is the region that was previously called Jiandi Dao (湔氐道) before the Tibetan empire was established.

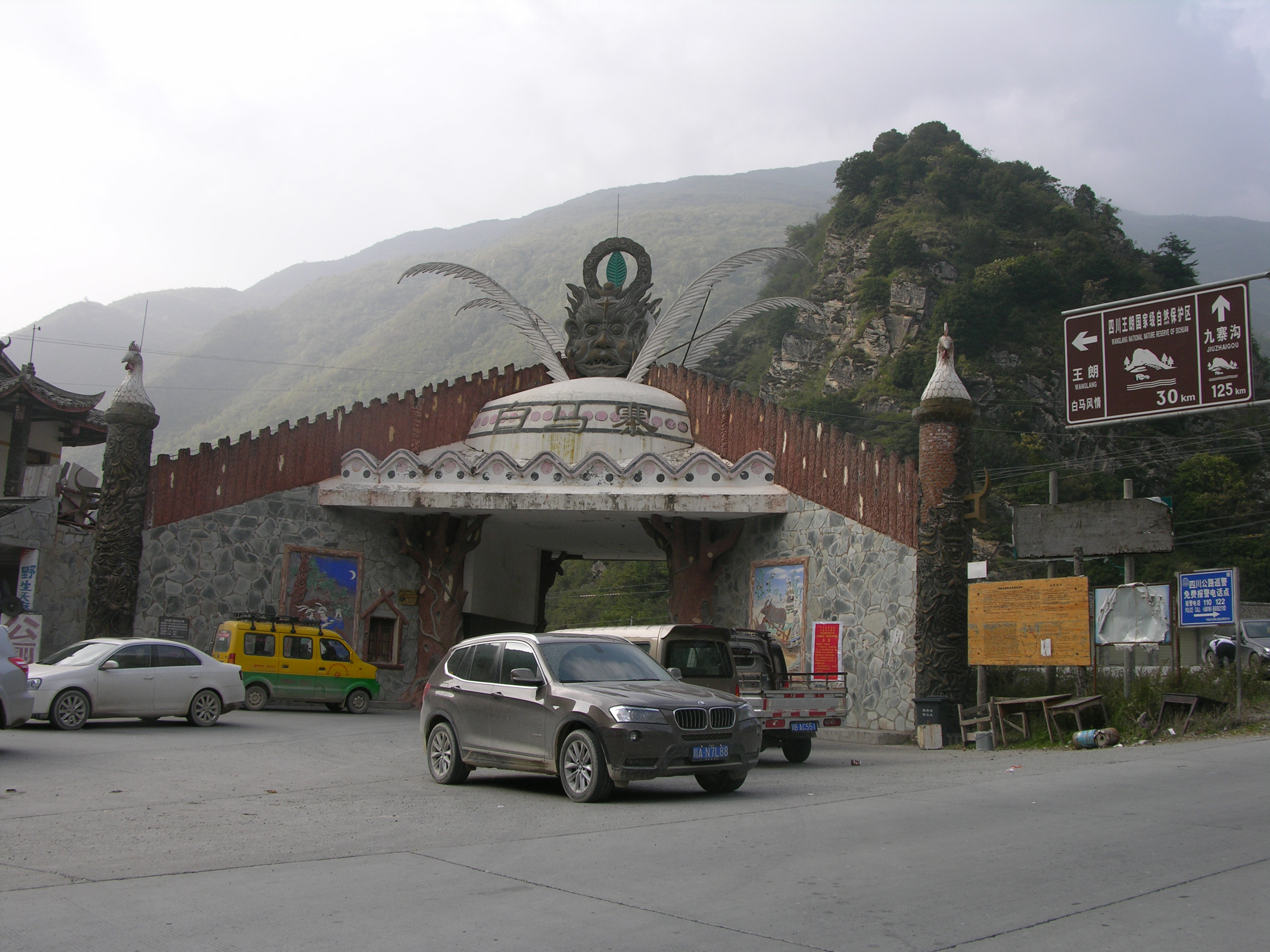
Baima village in Pingwu County
