= Zamthang County =

Zamtang County 壤塘县 · འཛམ་ཐང་རྫོང་། Camtang, Ndzamthang, Rangtang
- County
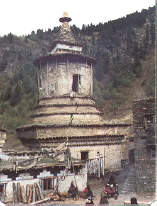
- Bathong Gompa of Dzongmda, Zamthang

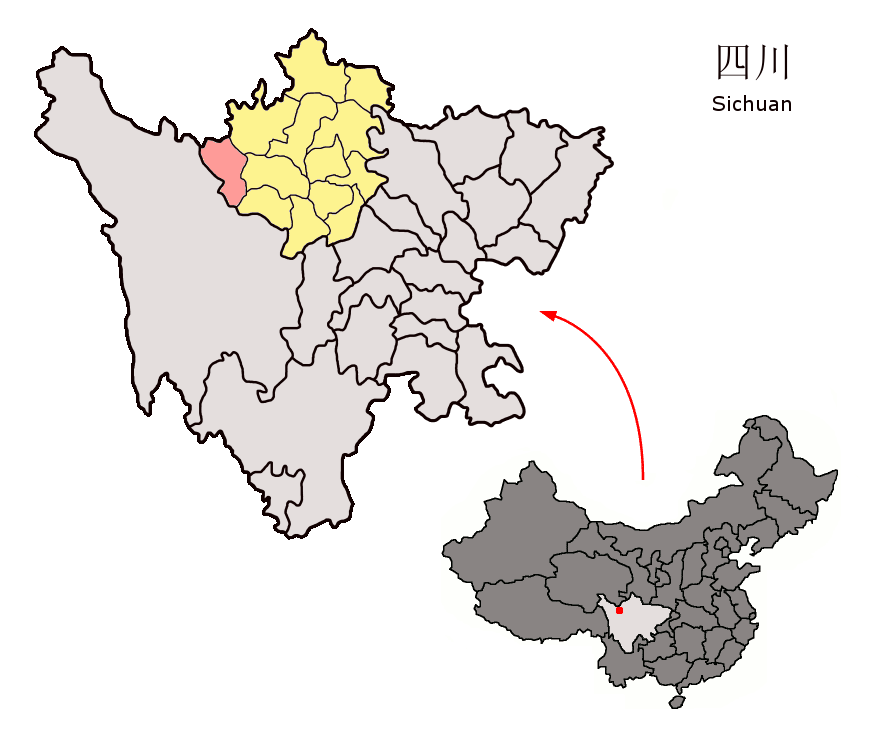
- Location of Zamtang County (red) within Ngawa Prefecture (yellow) and Sichuan

- Location in Sichuan Zamtang (China)
- Coordinates: 32°15′56″N 100°58′43″E
- Country: China
- Province: Sichuan
- Autonomous prefecture: Ngawa
- County seat: Gamda

Area
  - Total: 6,836 km^{2} (2,639 sq mi)
- Elevation: 3,285 m (10,778 ft)

Population (2020)
  - Total: 44,679
  - Density: 6.536/km^{2} (16.93/sq mi)
- Time zone: UTC+8 (China Standard)
- Website: www.rangtang.gov.cn

Zamthang County

Chinese name
- Simplified Chinese: 壤塘县
- Traditional Chinese: 壤塘縣
Transcriptions
Standard Mandarin
- Hanyu Pinyin: Rǎngtáng Xiàn

Tibetan name
- Tibetan: འཛམ་ཐང་རྫོང་། or ཛམ་ཐང་རྫོང་། or ཛཾ་ཐང་རྫོང་།
Transcriptions
- Wylie: ʼdzam thang rdzong or dzam thang rdzong or dzam thang rdzong
- Tibetan Pinyin: Zamtang Zong or Camtang Zong

Zamthang County or Ndzamthang County (Tibetan: འཛམ་ཐང་རྫོང་།, Wylie: dzam thang rdzong, ZWPY: Camtang Zong), or Rangtang County (Chinese: 壤塘县; pinyin: Rǎngtáng Xiàn) is a county in the northwest of Sichuan Province, China, bordering on the Banma County of Qinghai Province to the north. It is one of 13 counties under the administration of and lies the westernmost county-level division of the Ngawa Tibetan and Qiang Autonomous Prefecture. Zamthang is on the upper reaches of the Dadu River, bordering the Barkam County and Ngawa County on the east and northeast, and adjoining Jinchuan County on the south, and Sêrtar County, Luhuo County and Dawu County in the west and south. Zamthang, which means "the field of Jambhala" (Tibetan: ཛམ་པ་ལ་ཐང་།) in Tibetan, lies in the southeast of the Tibetan Plateau and in the historical region of Amdo. The vast majority of the population is Tibetan (30,200), followed by Han people (3949), Qiang people (269) and Hui people (78).

== History ==
In 1958, according to the result of the 81st conference of State Council, Zamthang county was founded. The name of the county was retrieved from a natural village located in the current administrative region of the county. The village was located on a hill shaped like a Jambhala holding a Dhvaja. According to the Tibetan-Chinese dictionary published by Publishing House of Minority Nationalities, Jambhala in Tibetan means Caishen in Chinese, therefore "Jambhala" was retrieved to be part of the county's name (Chinese: 壤巴拉; Tibetan: ཛམ་པ་ལ). Also, there was a flat ground located in front of the hill, in Tibetan, "thang" (ཐང་) means "ground" or "field", therefore, the second part was retrieved as "thang" (塘). Therefore, the county's name is the combination of "Jambhala" and "thang". In order to simplify the name, the government took "Jam" in "Jambhala" as "Zam" (壤; འཛམ) and made the county's name "Zamthang" (壤塘; འཛམ་ཐང་།).

== Culture ==
=== Jonang Buddhism ===
Between Xiangla Dongji Holy Mountain Scenic Area and Haizi Mountain Scenic Area, which are the two most famous touristic attraction in Zamthang, bred the religion of Jonang Buddhism, one of the schools of Tibetan Buddhism. The other schools are Nyingma, Kagyu, Sakya, Kadam, Gelug, gcod yul (གཅོད་ཡུལ་པ་་) and Bon (the relationship to Tibetan Buddhism is controversial). The symbols of Jonang Buddhism in Zamtang are 3 famous temples with the name of Querji Temple, Zangwa Temple, and Zebuji temple, all of which are originated from The East SangzhuLuobuling monastery built in 1435 BC. The architecture of the monastery is integrated, made it shaped like a small town. There was also another statement that instead of a small village, the name of the county was actually from the monastery. The builder of the monastery was called Zhong, who was an influential man in Ming dynasty. Zhong was named "The master of Promoting the doctrine" by the imperial court of Ming dynasty.

=== Language ===
Most of the Tibetan people in Zamthang are Gyalrong people, and they mainly speak Amdo Tibetan, which is one of four main spoken Tibetic languages, the other three are Central Tibetan, Khams Tibetan and Ladakhi language. The people who speak Amdo Tibetan can not understand the people who speak the other three Tibetic languages, because although these four languages share the same written script, their phonology, grammar and vocabulary are quite different. Therefore, Zamthang people cannot directly talk to Lhasa people, unless they specifically go learn the Central Tibetan language. More specifically, the Amdo Tibetan is not a tonal and retains many word-initial consonant clusters that have been lost in Central Tibetan.

=== The 9-floor Maitreya Pagoda ===
The 9-floor Maitreya Pagoda in Zamthang could be regarded as an exhibition hall of Buddharupa, displaying various Buddharupa including murals, Thangka paintings, clay statues and some metal statues. What's interesting about the pagoda is that outside the wall of the 9th floor of the pagoda, each side has a row of stone slabs protruding from the wall, about 20 cm in length, and exactly one-foot board is placed on it. The explorer can come out from the gate of the tower, hold the tower body in his hand, move his/her steps on this row of suspended stone slabs, and turn around the pagoda.

=== Lhamo in Nanmuda Town ===
This Lhamo in Nanmuda is one of the Lhamo that mainly performed in Amdo district, and it performs in Amdo Tibetan or Amdo folk singings.

=== Sculpture and painting ===
Sculptures and paintings are a must-look in the religious culture and art of Zamthang area. There are clay sculptures, woodcut or woodcarving sculptures, brick carving sculptures, sculptures made of Yak butter and sandpaintings, all of which have perfect and vivid shapes. The Buddharupa in temples are mainly clay sculptures and woodcarving sculptures, where woodcarving sculptures are generally used on lintels, pillar windows and other buildings, with dragons, tigers, lions and Ashtamangalas symbolizing good luck engraved on it. The brick carving sculptures are mainly used to construct the roof lace of Tibetan-style buildings, animals on the cornice and relieves on the windowpane. Sandpaintings are mainly to draw Thangka paintings and murals. Thangkas, called religious scroll paintings, are painted with brocade, silk embroidery, and colour paintings. As a treasure of Tibetan religious art, they have precious value and are enshrined in temples or Tibetan homes. The murals are mainly used to decorate the temple corridors.

=== Apparel ===
Tibetan costumes in Zamthang have materials mainly used sheepskin and pupu (wool material woven with wool). The Zamthang robe is long, with a broad front and border. In some Tibetan festivals, people in Zamthang will Wear a felt hat, a silk ribbon around the waist, a waist knife. Many Tibetan robes use cloths or high-grade cloths, and colourful silk or precious otter skin (or other animal skins). The costume is inlaid with expensive coral, agate, turquoise, jade or gold and silver. A Tibetan robe is extremely valuable.

=== Weddings and funerals ===
Zamthang is located in a traditional Tibetan pastoral area，the relationship between men and women is free, but marriage requires parental consent. The date of marriage is usually determined by the Living Buddha or lama. The Tibetan funerals in Zamthang are religious funerals with Tibetan traditions. Cremation was only used for lama or respectable people in ancient times, while it became popular among normal Tibetan people after the new millennium and have certain specifications. Babies or children are usually buried in water. Only villains or bad persons are buried in the ground.

== Administrative divisions ==
Zamthang comprises 8 townships and 3 towns:

Name	Simplified Chinese	Hanyu Pinyin	Tibetan	Wylie	Administrative division code
Towns
Namda Town (Nanmuda)	南木达镇	Nánmùdá Zhèn	ན་མདའ་གྲོང་རྡལ།	na mdav grong rdal	513230101
Camtang Parma Town (Zhongrangtang)	中壤塘镇	Zhōngrǎngtáng Zhèn	ཛམ་ཐང་བར་མ་གྲོང་རྡལ།	dzam thang bar ma grong rdal	513230102
Gamda Town (Gangmuda)	岗木达镇	Gǎngmùdá Zhèn	རྐ་མདའ་གྲོང་རྡལ།	rka mdav grong rdal	513230103
Townships
Posü Township (Poxü, Puxi)	蒲西乡	Púxī Xiāng	ཕོ་སུལ་ཡུལ་ཚོ།	pho sul yul tsho	513230200
Jangkog Township (Zongke)	宗科乡	Zōngkē Xiāng	གཅང་ཁོག་ཞང་།	gcang khog zhang	513230201
Tarkug Township (Shili, Sili)	石里乡	Shílǐ Xiāng	དར་ཁུག་ཡུལ་ཚོ།	dar khug yul tsho	513230202
Pugjê Township (Wuyi)	吾伊乡	Wúyī Xiāng	བུག་རྗེས་ཡུལ་ཚོ།	bug rjes yul tsho	513230203
Dodoi Township (Shangduke)	上杜柯乡	Shàngdùkē Xiāng	རྡོ་སྟོད་ཡུལ་ཚོ།	rdo stod yul tsho	513230205
Zongda Township (Rongmuda)	茸木达乡	Róngmùdá Xiāng	རྫོང་མདའ་ཡུལ་ཚོ།	rdzong mdav yul tsho	513230206
Gatog Township (Kaitog, Gaduo)	尕多乡	Gǎduō Xiāng	ཀ་ཐོག་ཡུལ་ཚོ།	ka thog yul tsho	513230208
Zidoi Township (Shangrangtang)	上壤塘乡	Shàngrǎngtáng Xiāng	འཛི་སྟོད་ཡུལ་ཚོ།	vdzi stod yul tsho	513230210

== Climate ==
Climate data for Zamthang, elevation 3,293 m (10,804 ft), (1991–2020 normals, extremes 1981–present)
Month	Jan	Feb	Mar	Apr	May	Jun	Jul	Aug	Sep	Oct	Nov	Dec	Year
Record high °C (°F)	19.0 (66.2)	20.5 (68.9)	23.8 (74.8)	26.5 (79.7)	28.7 (83.7)	29.3 (84.7)	29.7 (85.5)	31.6 (88.9)	28.6 (83.5)	25.9 (78.6)	23.3 (73.9)	19.3 (66.7)	31.6 (88.9)
Mean daily maximum °C (°F)	7.3 (45.1)	9.3 (48.7)	11.9 (53.4)	15.1 (59.2)	18.1 (64.6)	20.0 (68.0)	22.0 (71.6)	21.9 (71.4)	19.5 (67.1)	15.0 (59.0)	11.5 (52.7)	8.0 (46.4)	15.0 (58.9)
Daily mean °C (°F)	−4.2 (24.4)	−1.4 (29.5)	2.1 (35.8)	5.8 (42.4)	9.2 (48.6)	12.0 (53.6)	13.6 (56.5)	13.1 (55.6)	10.6 (51.1)	5.9 (42.6)	0.4 (32.7)	−3.8 (25.2)	5.3 (41.5)
Mean daily minimum °C (°F)	−12.5 (9.5)	−9.4 (15.1)	−5.0 (23.0)	−0.8 (30.6)	3.1 (37.6)	7.0 (44.6)	8.5 (47.3)	7.9 (46.2)	5.8 (42.4)	0.8 (33.4)	−6.5 (20.3)	−11.4 (11.5)	−1.0 (30.1)
Record low °C (°F)	−23.5 (−10.3)	−20.8 (−5.4)	−17.6 (0.3)	−8.4 (16.9)	−6.1 (21.0)	−1.5 (29.3)	0.5 (32.9)	−0.6 (30.9)	−2.7 (27.1)	−10.8 (12.6)	−16.9 (1.6)	−23.4 (−10.1)	−23.5 (−10.3)
Average precipitation mm (inches)	3.9 (0.15)	7.8 (0.31)	23.9 (0.94)	47.1 (1.85)	101.5 (4.00)	159.8 (6.29)	147.2 (5.80)	114.1 (4.49)	112.2 (4.42)	55.6 (2.19)	8.4 (0.33)	2.8 (0.11)	784.3 (30.88)
Average precipitation days (≥ 0.1 mm)	3.5	6.4	10.4	14.1	20.3	24.2	21.2	18.9	20.6	15.2	4.9	3.2	162.9
Average snowy days	5.4	8.7	13.6	10.3	1.8	0.1	0	0	0.3	4.8	6.5	4.4	55.9
Average relative humidity (%)	44	45	51	58	65	74	75	75	77	71	55	48	62
Mean monthly sunshine hours	151.2	142.5	167.5	185.3	179.6	147.9	168.5	167.6	147.7	147.0	153.9	155.5	1,914.2
Percentage possible sunshine	47	45	45	47	42	35	39	41	40	42	49	50	44
Source: China Meteorological Administration
