= Central Tibetan =

Tibetic language

- Ü-Tsang
- དབུས་སྐད་, Dbus skad / Ükä དབུས་གཙང་སྐད་, Dbus-gtsang skad / Ü-tsang kä
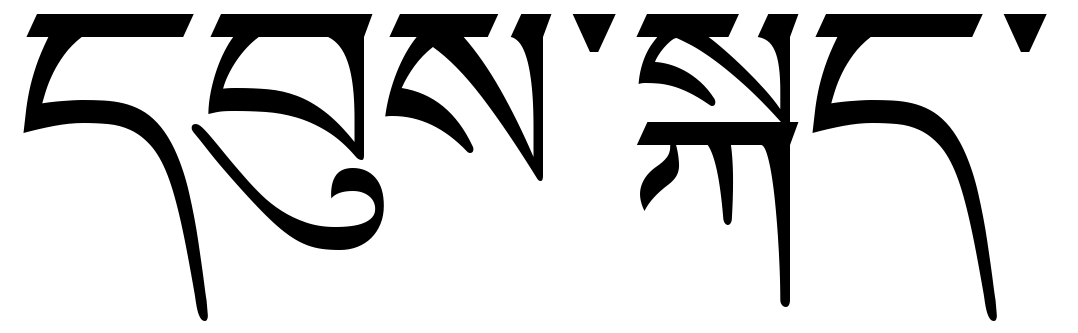
- The name of the language written in the Tibetan script
- Pronunciation: [wýkɛʔ, wýʔtsáŋ kɛʔ]
- Native to: Tibet: Central Tibet; Mustang; Dolpo; Humla
- Region: Tibet (Ü-Tsang, Amdo and Kham)
- Native speakers: (1.2 million cited 1990–2014)
- Language family: Sino-Tibetan: Tibeto-Burman; Tibeto-Kanauri (?); Bodish; Tibetic; Central Tibetan
- Standard forms: Lasetian; Standard Tibetan
- Writing system: Tibetan script

Language codes
- ISO 639-3: Variously: bod – Lhasa Tibetan dre – Dolpo hut – Humla, Limi lhm – Lhomi (Shing Saapa) muk – Mugom (Mugu) kte – Nubri ola – Walungge (Gola) loy – Lowa/Loke (Mustang) tcn – Tichurong
- Glottolog: tibe1272 Tibetan sout3216 South-Western Tibetic (partial match) basu1243 Basum
- ELP: Walungge
- Dolpo
- Lhomi
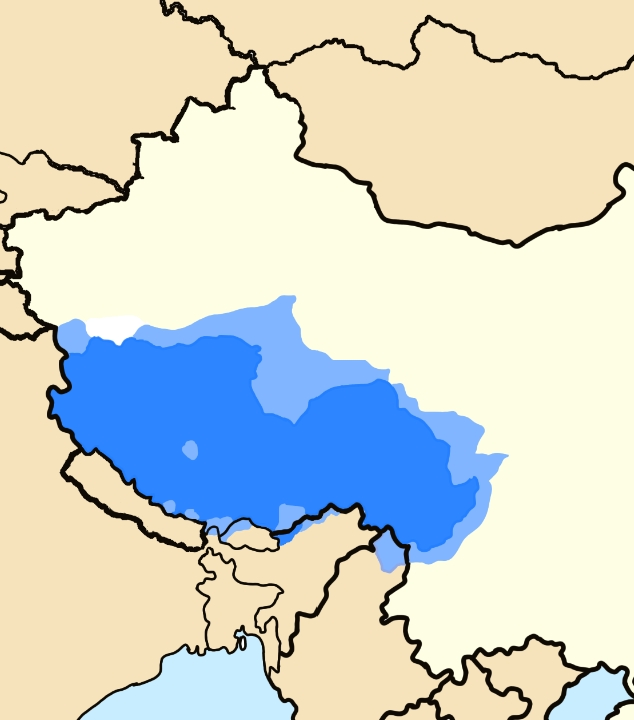
- Areas where Tibetan language is spoken

- Shingsaba is classified as Vulnerable by the UNESCO Atlas of the World's Languages in Danger.

Central Tibetan language, also known as Ü-Tsang dialect, Dbus Tibetan, or Ü Tibetan, is the most widely spoken Tibetic language and the basis of Standard Tibetan.

Dbus is the Wylie spelling of the name in Tibetan script, དབུས་, whereas Ü is the pronunciation of the same in Lhasa dialect, [wy˧˥˧ʔ] (or [y˧˥˧ʔ]). All of these names are frequently applied specifically to the prestige dialect of Lhasa.

== Varieties ==
Dbus and Gtsang

There are many mutually intelligible Central Tibetan languages besides that of Lhasa, with particular diversity along the border and in Nepal:

Limi (Limirong), Mugum, Dolpo (Dolkha), Mustang (Lowa, Lokä), Humla, Nubri, Lhomi, Dhrogpai Gola, Walungchung Gola (Walungge/Halungge), Tseku
Basum (most divergent, possibly a separate language)

Ethnologue reports that Walungge is highly intelligible with Thudam.

Glottolog reports these South-Western Tibetic languages as forming a separate subgroup of languages within Central Tibetan languages, but that Thudam is not a distinct variety. On the opposite, Glottolog does not classify Basum within Central Tibetan but leaves it unclassified within Tibetic languages.

Tournadre (2013) classifies Tseku with Khams.

Central Tibetan has 70% lexical similarity with Amdo Tibetan and 80% lexical similarity with Khams Tibetan.

Qu & Jing (2017), a comparative survey of Central Tibetan lects, documents the Lhasa, Shigatse, Gar, Sherpa, Basum, Gertse, and Nagqu varieties.

=== Ngari Tibetan ===
Ngari Tibetan, more specifically Stöd Ngari (as opposed to the language of pre-1842 Lower Ngari that is now an independent language), is the endonym for a topolect spoken around Ngari Prefecture, T.A.R. Traditionally, it is considered a divergent variety of Dbusgtsang but not Dbusgtsang proper, however, some Western Khams Tibetan varieties such as Gêrzê Tibetan and Nagqu Tibetan are now considered part of the Ngari Tibetan areal group as well. In Indian-administrated Tibet since the 1846 British invasion of Spiti, a related topolect is now known under the exonym "Lahuli and Spiti".

== Consonants ==
IPA	Tibetan writing	Wade–Giles	Tibetan Pinyin
[k]	ཀ་	k	g
[kʰ]	ཁ་ ག་	kh, g	k
[ŋ]	ང་	ng	ng
[tɕ]	ཅ་	c	j
[tɕʰ]	ཆ་ ཇ་	ch, j	q
[ɲ]	ཉ་	ny	ny
[t]	ཏ་	t	d
[tʰ]	ཐ་ ད་	th, d	t
[n]	ན་	n	n
[p]	པ་	p	b
[pʰ]	ཕ་ བ་	ph, b	p
[m]	མ་	m	m
[ts]	ཙ་	ts	z
[tsʰ]	ཚ་ ཛ་	tsh, dz	c
[w]	ཝ་	w	w

IPA	Tibetan writing	Wade–Giles	Tibetan Pinyin
[ɕ]	ཞ་ ཤ་	zh, sh	x
[s]	ཟ་ ས་	z, s	s
[j]	ཡ་	y	y
[ɹ]	ར་	r	r
[l]	ལ་	l	l
[h]	ཧ་	h	h
[c]	ཀྱ་	gy	gy
[cʰ]	ཁྱ་ གྱ་	ky	ky
[tʂ]	ཀྲ་	kr	zh
[tʂʰ]	ཁྲ་ གྲ་	khr, gr	ch
[ʂ]	ཧྲ་	hr	sh
[ɬ]	ལྷ་	lh	lh

- འ is not commonly transliterated to Roman, in the Wade–Giles system ' is used.

== Vowels ==
ཨ།	ཨའུ།	ཨག། ཨགས།	ཨང༌། ཨངས།	ཨབ། ཨབས།	ཨམ། ཨམས།	ཨར།	ཨལ། ཨའི།	ཨད། ཨས།	ཨན།
a	au	ag	aŋ	ab	am	ar	ai/ä	ai/ä	ain/än
ཨི། ཨིལ། ཨའི།	ཨིའུ། ཨེའུ།	ཨིག། ཨིགས།	ཨིང༌། ཨིངས།	ཨིབ། ཨིབས།	ཨིམ། ཨིམས།	ཨིར།		ཨིད། ཨིས།	ཨིན།
i	iu	ig	iŋ	ib	im	ir		i	in
ཨུ།		ཨུག། ཨུགས།	ཨུང༌། ཨུངས།	ཨུབ། ཨུབས།	ཨུམ། ཨུམས།	ཨུར།	ཨུལ། ཨུའི།	ཨུད། ཨུས།	ཨུན།
u		ug	uŋ	ub	um	ur	ü	ü	ün
ཨེ། ཨེལ། ཨེའི།		ཨེག། ཨེགས།	ཨེང༌། ཨེངས།	ཨེབ། ཨེབས།	ཨེམ། ཨེམས།	ཨེར།		ཨེད། ཨེས།	ཨེན།
ê		êg	êŋ	êb	êm	êr		ê	ên
ཨོ།		ཨོག། ཨོགས།	ཨོང༌། ཨོངས།	ཨོབ། ཨོབས།	ཨོམ། ཨོམས།	ཨོར།	ཨོལ། ཨོའི།	ཨོད། ཨོས།	ཨོན།
o		og	oŋ	ob	om	or	oi/ö	oi/ö	oin/ön

=== Pronunciation ===
IPA	Wade–Giles	Tibetan Pinyin	IPA	Wade–Giles	Tibetan Pinyin
[a]	a	a			
[ɛ]	al, a'i	ai/ä	[ɛ̃]	an	ain/än
[i]	i, il, i'i	i	[ĩ]	in	in
[u]	u	u			
[y]	ul, u'i	ü	[ỹ]	un	ün
[e]	e, el, e'i	ê	[ẽ]	en	ên
[o]	o	o			
[ø]	ol, o'i	oi/ö	[ø̃]	on	oin/ön

一"ai, ain, oi, oin" is also written to "ä, än, ö, ön".

==== Conjunct vowels ====
IPA	Wade–Giles	Tibetan Pinyin
[au]	a'u	au
[iu]	i'u, e'u	iu

=== Last consonant ===
IPA	Wade–Giles	Tibetan Pinyin
[ʔ]	d, s	none
[n]		n
[k/ʔ]	g, gs	g
[ŋ]	ng, ngs	ng
[p]	b, bs	b
[m]	m, ms	m
[r]	r	r

== See also ==
- Lhasa Tibetan
- Amdo Tibetan
- Ladakhi language
- Balti language
- Ü-Tsang
- Sound correspondences between Tibetic languages
