= Rongmuda Township, Sichuan =

Rongmuda Township 茸木达乡
- Township
- Rongmudaxiang
- Location in Sichuan
- Coordinates: 32°30′45″N 101°3′13″E
- Country: People's Republic of China
- Province: Sichuan
- Autonomous prefecture: Ngawa Tibetan and Qiang Autonomous Prefecture
- County: Zamtang County

Area
  - Total: 211.3 km^{2} (81.6 sq mi)

Population (2010)
  - Total: 1,970
  - Density: 9.32/km^{2} (24.1/sq mi)
- Time zone: UTC+8 (China Standard)

Rongmuda (Mandarin: 茸木达乡) is a township in Zamthang County, Ngawa Tibetan and Qiang Autonomous Prefecture, Sichuan, China. In 2010, Rongmuda Township had a total population of 1,970: 971 males and 999 females: 527 aged under 14, 1,270 aged between 15 and 65 and 173 aged over 65.
