= Nicolas Tournadre =

French linguist

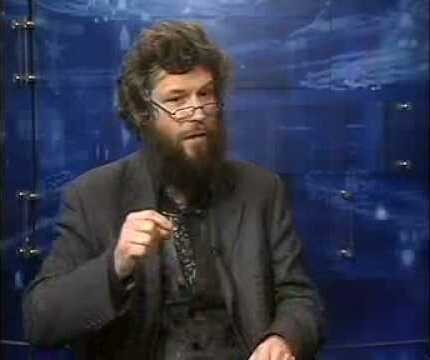
- Nicolas Tournadre, 2009
- Born: 1959 (age 66–67)

Academic background
- Education: University of Paris III: Sorbonne Nouvelle

Nicolas Tournadre is a professor at the University of Provence specializing in morphosyntax and typology. He is a member of the LACITO lab of the CNRS.

His research mainly deals with ergative morphosyntax and grammatical semantics of tense, aspect, mood and evidentiality.

Tournadre specializes in Tibetic languages. Since 1986, he has carried out fieldwork on the Tibetan High Plateau, in the Himalayas and the Karakoram in China, India, Bhutan, Nepal and Pakistan.

Tournadre taught at the Institute of Oriental Languages (Inalco), at the Paris 8 University, at the University of Virginia and conducted research in the Tibet Academy of Social Sciences.

He obtained his Ph.D. in 1992 at the University of Paris III: Sorbonne Nouvelle under the supervision of Claude Hagège.

In 2000, he was awarded the CNRS Bronze Medal.

== Publications ==
- Manual of Standard Tibetan with Sangda Dorje. (2 CDs), preface : Matthew Kapstein, Snowlion. Ithaca, New York. French Edition: Avec Sangda Dorjé, 2003, Manuel de tibétain standard, langue et civilisation (préface de Claude Hagège), Paris, L’Asiathèque « Langues et mondes », 544 p., accompagné de 2 CD; 2nde édition révisée.
- Avec Françoise Robin, Le grand livre des proverbes tibétains, Paris, Presses du Châtelet, 235 p., 2006
- L'ergativité en tibétain moderne, Peeters Publishers, 1996
- Comparaison des systèmes médiatifs de quatre dialectes tibétains (tibétain central, ladakhi, dzongkha et amdo)—In : L'énonciation médiatisée / Z. Guentchéva (Ed.) -- Louvain : Peeters, 1996, p. 195-213
- Avec Kesang Gyurmé, et Heather Stoddard Le clair miroir 1994
- Avec Lhakpa Norbu Sherpa, Gyurme Chodrak and Guillaume Oisel, 2009, Sherpa-English and English-Sherpa Dictionary, with Literary Tibetan and Nepali equivalents, 295 p. Vajra Bookstore, Kathmandu.
- Le Prisme des langues, Paris, L’Asiathèque, 352 p., 2014. Second improved edition: 2016
