= Amdo Tibetan =

Tibetic language of Amdo

Amdolese
- ཨ་མདོའི་སྐད།, A-mdo’i skad
- Native to: China
- Region: Amdo (includes Qinghai, Gansu, Tibet Autonomous Region and Sichuan)
- Native speakers: 1.8 million (2005)
- Language family: Sino-Tibetan: Tibeto-Burman; Tibeto-Kanauri (?); Bodish; Tibetic; Amdolese
- Writing system: Tibetan script

Language codes
- ISO 639-3: adx
- Glottolog: amdo1237

Amdo Tibetan (Tibetan script: ཨ་མདོའི་སྐད་, Wylie: A-mdo’i skad, Lhasa dialect: [ámtokɛ́ʔ], natively [amdeskɛ] or [amdihke], also called Am kä), or Amdo dialect is the Tibetic language spoken in Amdo (now mostly in Qinghai, some in Ngawa and Gannan). It has two varieties, the farmer dialects and the nomad dialects.

Amdo is one of the three branches of traditional classification of Tibetic languages (the other two being Khams Tibetan and Ü-Tsang Tibetan). In terms of mutual intelligibility, Amdo speakers cannot communicate even at a basic level with the Ü-Tsang branch (including Lhasa Tibetan).

Amdo Tibetan has 70% lexical similarity with Central Tibetan and Khams Tibetan.

The nomad dialect of Amdo Tibetan is closer to classical written Tibetan as it preserves the word-initial consonant clusters and it is non-tonal (a trait shared with Ladakhi), both now elided in the Ü-Tsang branch (including Lhasa Tibetan). Hence, its conservatism in phonology has become a source of pride among Amdo Tibetans.

Amdo is one of the Tibetic languages that have undergone a spelling reform to make the written form closer to the spoken language: Guŋthaŋpa Dkonmchog Bstanpa˛i Sgronme (1762–1823) wrote "the Profound Dharma given in the vernacular so as to be well understood by all people of weak intellect" in the early 19th century using the vernacular of the time. Modern Amdo works have continued the use of vernacular-based orthography: the 2007 novel Joys and Sorrows of the Nagtsang Boy, originally "written in kha skad", was translated to literary Tibetan and published in India in 2008.

== Dialects ==
Dialects are:

- North Kokonor (Kangtsa, Themchen, Arik, etc.)
- West Kokonor (Dulan, Na'gormo, etc.),
- Southeast Kokonor (Jainca, Thrika, Hualong, etc.)
- Labrang (Labrang, Luchu)
- Golok (Machen, Matö, Gabde)
- Ngapa (Ngapa, Dzorge, Dzamthang)
- Kandze

Bradley (1997) includes Thewo and Choni as close to Amdo if not actually Amdo dialects.

Mabzhi is a dialect belonging to the Kokonor group of Amdo Tibetan (Tsering Samdrup and Suzuki 2017).

mDungnag, a divergent Tibetan language spoken in Gansu, is not mutually intelligible with any of the Amdo dialects.

Hua (2001) contains word lists of the Xiahe County 夏河, Tongren County 同仁, Xunhua County 循化, Hualong County 化隆, Hongyuan County 红原, and Tianjun County 天峻 dialects of Amdo Tibetan in Gansu and Qinghai provinces.

== Phonology ==
=== Consonants ===
		Labial	Alveolar		Retroflex	(Alveolo-) palatal	Velar	Uvular/ Glottal	
		Labial	plain	sib.	Retroflex	(Alveolo-) palatal	Velar	plain	lab.
Nasal		m	n			ɲ	ŋ		
Plosive/ Affricate	voiceless	p	t	ts	ʈ	tɕ	k		
Plosive/ Affricate	aspirated	pʰ	tʰ	tsʰ	ʈʰ	tɕʰ	kʰ		
Plosive/ Affricate	voiced	b	d	dz	ɖ	dʑ	ɡ		
Fricative	voiceless		ɬ	s	ʂ	ɕ	x	h	hʷ
Fricative	aspirated			sʰ					
Fricative	voiced			z	ʐ	ʑ		ʁ	ʁʷ
Approximant		w	l			j			

- Retroflex stop sounds /ʈ, ʈʰ, ɖ/ may also be pronounced as affricate sounds [ʈʂ, ʈʂʰ, ɖʐ] in free variation.
- Voiced consonants are often heard as pre-breathy-voiced (i.e. /d/ [ʱd]) among different dialects.
- /ʐ/, typically written phonemically as /r/, can be heard as an alveolar flap [ɾ] in word-medial positions.
- /x/ may also be heard as a palatal [ç] in free variation.
- Labio-dental fricatives /f/ and /v/ may also occur in words of foreign origin.

=== Vowels ===
	Front	Central	Back
Close	i	ɨ	u
Mid	e	ə	o
Open	a		

- Amdo Tibetan typically has a four-vowel system as /e, ə, a, o/, as all close vowels [i, ɨ, u] have merged to one vowel /ə/. However, when there is a consonant sound within the coda position, the pronunciation of /ə/ is changed, thus realizing one of the three close sounds [i, ɨ, u], depending on the consonant in place.
- /a/ may typically be heard as more fronted before a mid vowel /e/, and may also be realized as an open-mid [ɛ] in some environments.

== Media ==
Inside China

- The Qinghai Tibetan Radio (མཚོ་སྔོན་བོད་སྐད་རླུང་འཕྲིན།) station broadcasts in Amdolese Tibetan on FM 99.7.

Diaspora

- Radio Free Asia broadcasts in three Tibetan languages: Standard Tibetan, Khams language and Amdolese language.

== See also ==
- Balti language
- Central Tibetan
- Lhasa Tibetan
- Khams Tibetan
- Amdo Tibetan Swadesh list (Wiktionary)
- Sound correspondences between Tibetic languages

== Bibliography ==
- Norbu, Kalsang, Karl Peet, dPal Idan bKra shis, & Kevin Stuart, Modern Oral Amdo Tibetan: A Language Primer. Edwin Mellen Press, 2000.
- Hua Kan 华侃主编 (ed). 2001. Vocabulary of Amdo Tibetan dialects [藏语安多方言词汇]. Lanzhou: Gansu People's Press [甘肃民族出版社]. (Contains word lists of the Xiahe County 夏河, Tongren County 同仁, Xunhua County 循化, Hualong County 化隆, Hongyuan County 红原, and Tianjun County 天峻 dialects in Gansu and Qinghai provinces.)
