= Tibet Academy of Social Sciences =

Social sciences academy

Coordinates: 29.66585°N 91.133°E

- 西藏自治区社会科学院
- Formation: August 5, 1985; 40 years ago
- Type: Government think tank
- Parent organization: People's Government of Tibet Autonomous Region
- Website: www.xzass.org

Tibet Academy of Social Sciences (Chinese: 西藏自治区社会科学院), or Tibet Autonomous Region Academy of Social Sciences, is a research institution and think tank directly under the People's Government of Tibet Autonomous Region. It hosts the journal Tibetan Studies.

== History ==
The preparations for the Academy of Social Sciences of the Autonomous Region began in December 1978. It was formally established on August 5, 1985. On December 11, 2013, the Institute of Beye Sutra of the Academy of Social Sciences of the Tibet Autonomous Region was formally established and licensed to carry out the study of the Palm-leaf manuscript, the compilation of the Dictionary of Tibetan Sanskrit-Chinese-English Comparison, and the editing and publication of Tibetan Beye Sutra Studies. On October 31, 2016, the Institute of South Asian Studies of the Tibet Autonomous Region Academy of Social Sciences was formally established.

== See also ==
- Chinese Academy of Social Sciences
