= Tibetic languages =

Subfamily of the Sino-Tibetan languages

Tibetan
- Tibetic; Central Bodish
- Geographic distribution: China (Tibet Autonomous Region, Qinghai, Sichuan, Gansu, Yunnan); India (Ladakh, Sikkim, Uttarakhand, Himachal Pradesh, Arunachal Pradesh, Assam); Pakistan (Gilgit-Baltistan); Nepal; Bhutan; Myanmar (Kachin State)
- Ethnicity: Tibetan people and other Tibetic-speaking peoples
- Native speakers: 6 million (2014)
- Linguistic classification: Sino-Tibetan: Tibeto-Burman; Tibeto-Kanauri (?); Bodish; Tibetan
- Early forms: Old Tibetan: Classical Tibetan
- Subdivisions: Central Tibetan; Amdo; Khams; Dzongkha–Lhokä; Ladakhi–Balti; Lahuli–Spiti; Kyirong–Kagate; Sherpa; Jirel

Language codes
- Glottolog: oldm1245
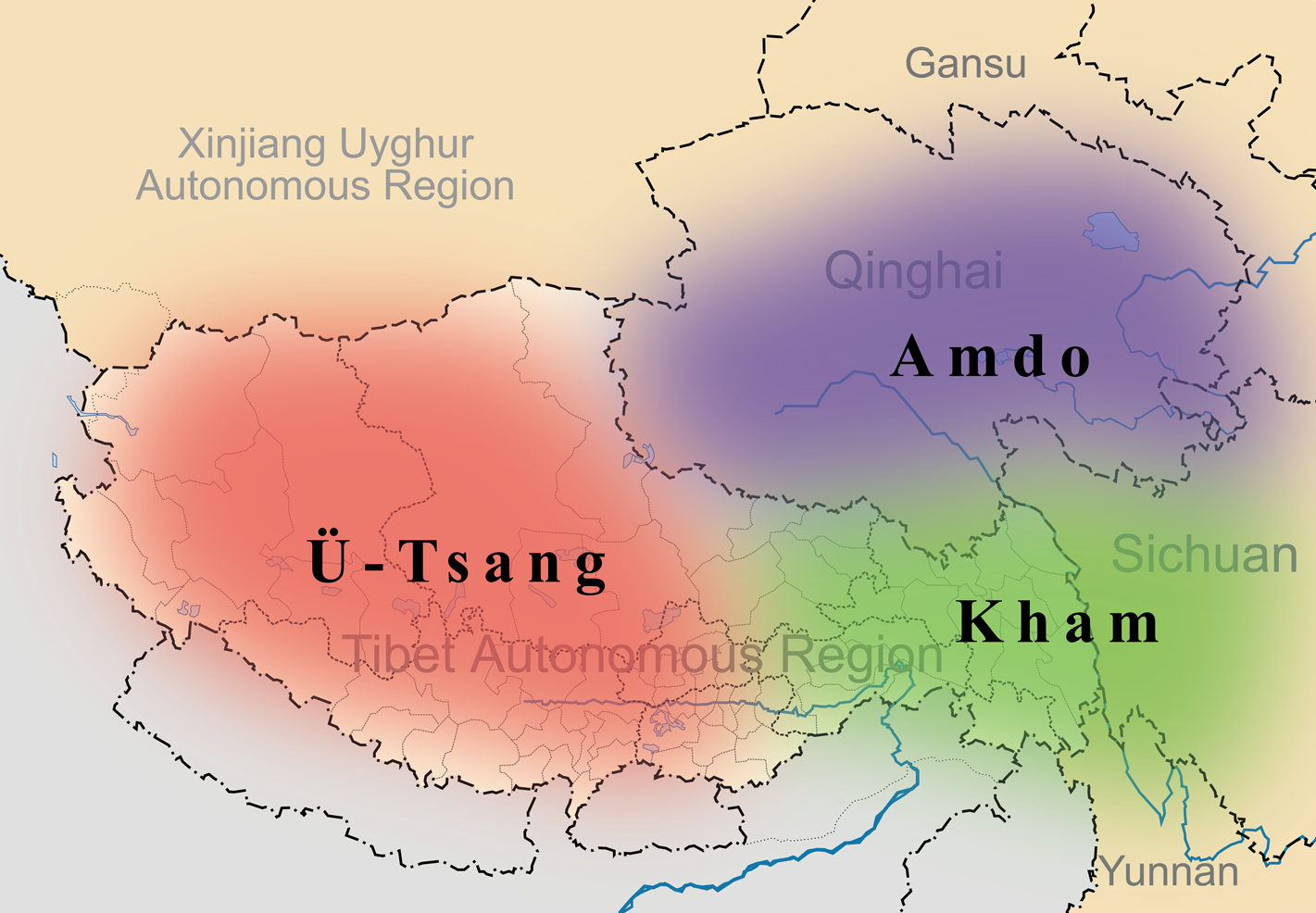
- Division of Tibetic Cultural Areas

The Tibetan language or Tibetic languages are a branch of the Tibeto-Burman languages in the Sino-Tibetan language family. Descending from Old Tibetan, there are 50 recognized Tibetic languages, which branch into more than 200 dialects, which can be grouped into eight dialect continua. These Tibetic languages are spoken in parts of China, Pakistan, Nepal, Bhutan, India and Myanmar. Classical Tibetan is the major literary language, particularly for its use in Tibetan Buddhist scriptures and literature.

Tibetan languages are spoken by some 6 million people, not all of whom are Tibetan. With the worldwide spread of Tibetan Buddhism, the Tibetan language has also spread into the western world and can be found in many Buddhist publications and prayer materials, while western students also learn the language for the translation of Tibetan texts. Outside of Lhasa itself, Lhasa Tibetan is spoken by approximately 200,000 exiled Tibetans who have moved from Tibet to India, Nepal and other countries. Tibetan is also spoken by groups of ethnic minorities in Tibet who have lived in close proximity to Tibetans for centuries, but nevertheless retain their own languages and cultures.

Although the Qiang peoples of Kham are classified by China as ethnic Tibetan, the Qiangic languages are not Tibetan, but rather form their own branch of the Tibeto-Burman language family.

Classical Tibetan was not a tonal language, but many varieties such as Central and Khams Tibetan have developed tone registers. Amdo and Ladakhi-Balti are without tone. Tibetan morphology can generally be described as agglutinative.

== Terminology ==
Although the term "Tibetic" had been applied in various ways within the Sino-Tibetan research tradition, Nicolas Tournadre defined it as a phylum derived from Old Tibetan. Following Nishi (1987) and Beyer (1992), he identified several lexical innovations that can be used as a diagnosis to distinguish Tibetic from the other languages of the family, such as བདུན bdun "seven".

The "Tibetic languages" in this sense are a substitute for the term "Tibetan languages/dialects" used in the previous literature; the distinction between "language" and "dialect" is not straightforward, and labeling varieties of Tibetic as "Tibetan dialects" can be misleading not only because those "dialects" are often mutually-unintelligible, but also the speakers of Tibetic do not necessarily consider themselves as ethnic Tibetan, as is the case with Sherpas, Ladakhis, Baltis, Lahaulas, Sikkimese and Bhutanese.

== Origins ==
Marius Zemp (2018) hypothesizes that Tibetan originated as a pidgin with the West Himalayish language Zhangzhung as its superstratum, and Rgyalrongic as its substratum (both languages are part of the broader Sino-Tibetan family). However, there are many grammatical differences between the Rgyalrongic and Tibetic languages; Rgyalrongic tend to use prefixes such as *kə-, *tə-, etc., while Tibetic languages use suffixes such as -pa/-ba, -ma, -po/-bo, -mo, etc.

Similarly, Tamangic also has a West Himalayish superstratum, but its substratum is derived from a different Sino-Tibetan branch.

Only a few language clusters in the world are derived from a common language which is identical to or closely related to an old literary language. This small group includes the Tibetic languages, as descendants from Old Tibetan (7th–9th centuries), but also the Romance languages with Latin, the Arabic languages (or "dialects") with Classical Arabic, the Sinitic languages with Old Chinese, the modern Indic languages with Vedic Sanskrit.

== Classification ==
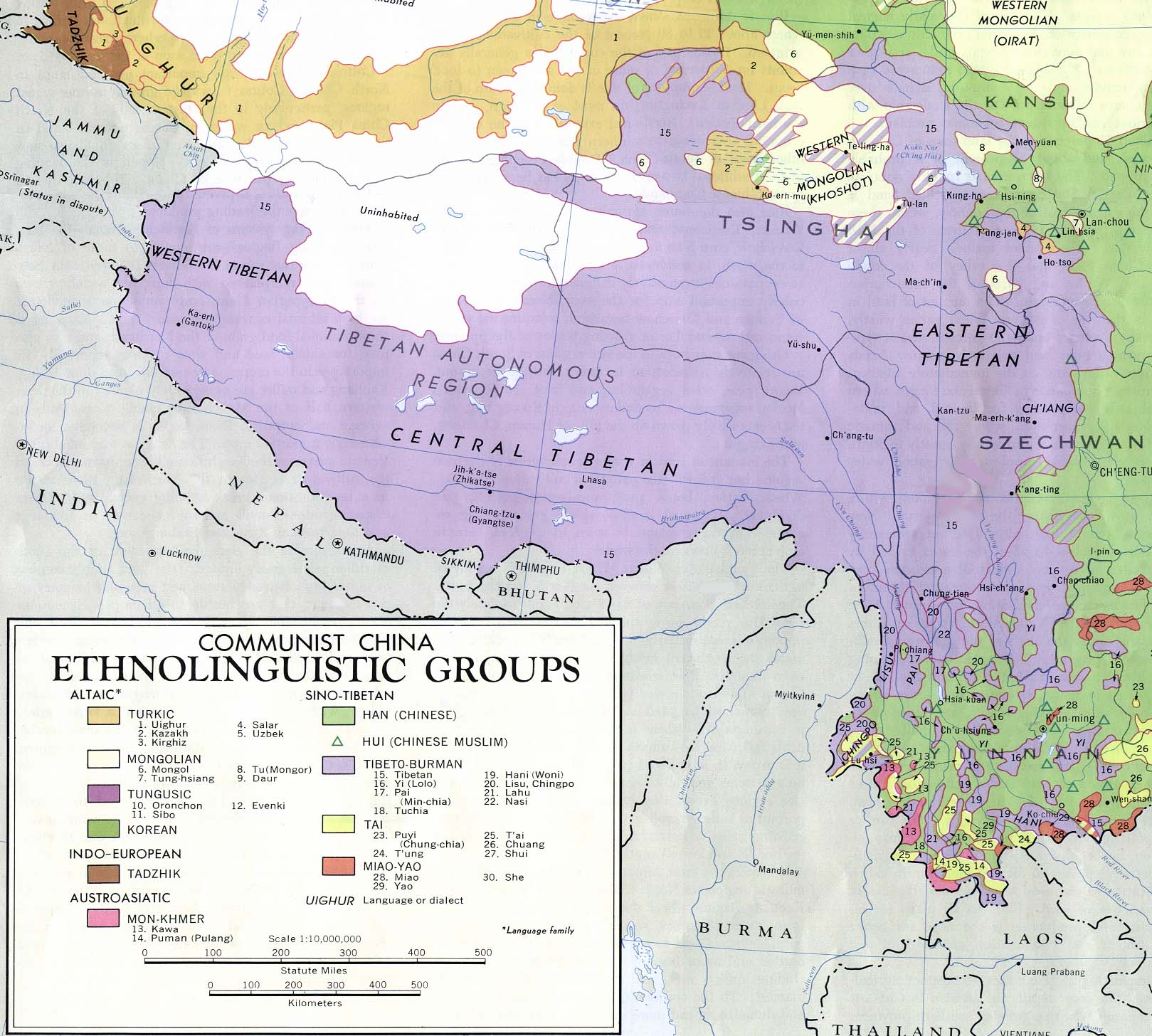
Ethnolinguistic map of Tibet

The more divergent languages are spoken in the north and east, likely due to language contact with the Qiangic, Rgyalrongic languages. The divergence exhibited in Khalong may also be due to language shift. In addition, there is Baima, which retains an apparent Qiangic substratum, and has multiple layers of borrowing from Amdo, Khams, and Zhongu, but does not correspond to any established branch of Tibetic.

The two major Tibetic languages used for broadcasting within China are Standard Tibetan and Amdo Tibetan.

=== Tournadre & Suzuki (2023) ===
Tournadre & Suzuki (2023) recognize 8 geographical sections, each with about 7-14 groups of Tibetic dialects. This classification is a revision of Tournadre (2014).

- Tibetic
  - South-eastern section (14 groups):
    - Nagchu (traditionally called Hor dialects)
    - Drachen/Bachen
    - Kyegu
    - Pämbar
    - Khyungpo
    - Rongdrak
    - Minyak Rabgang
    - Northern route (including Chamdo / chab-mdo, Derge / sde-dge, Kandze / dkar-mdzes)
    - Southern route (including Markham, Bathang, Lithang)
    - Dzayül
    - Derong-nJol
    - Chagthreng
    - Pomborgang
    - Semkyi Nyida (including Lamdo and possibly Stonggnyen)
  - Eastern section (11 groups):
    - Čone
    - Thewo-tö
    - Thewo-mä
    - Drugchu
    - Pälkyi/Pashi
    - Khöpokhok
    - Sharkhok
    - Thromjekhok
    - Zhongu
    - Throchu
    - Baima
  - North-eastern section (14 groups):
    - Tsho Ngönpo (or Kokonor)
    - Tsongkha
    - Labrang-Rebgong
    - Rwanak (Banak) pastoralist group
    - Ngawa
    - Arik
    - Hwari (Pari)
    - Mewa pastoralists’ group (with settlements in Kham)
    - Washül pastoralists’group (with migrations into Kham)
    - Gorkä (divergent)
    - Gyälrongo-spheric Amdo (divergent)
    - Dungnak and rTarmnyik (near Western Yughur in Gansu) (divergent)
  - Central section (8 groups):
    - Ü
    - Tsang
    - Phänpo
    - Tö pastoralists’ dialects (Drogpä Tö-kä)
    - Eastern Tö cultivators’ dialects (Sharchok Rongpä Tö-kä)
    - Western Tö cultivators’ dialects (Nubchok Rongpä Tö-kä)
    - Kongpo
    - Lhokha
  - Southern section (7 groups):
    - Dzongkha
    - Lhoke
    - Choča-ngača (also called Tsamang-Tsakhaling)
    - Brokpa (Mera Sakteng pastoralists’ dialect)
    - Dur pastoralists’ dialect
    - Lakha or Säphuk pastoralists’ dialect
    - Dromo
  - South-western section (9 groups):
    - Humla (or Limirong)
    - Karmarong (Mugu)
    - Dölpo and Tichyurong
    - Lo-Mönthang (often called Lokä/Mustang)
    - Kyirong-Yolmo
    - Jirel
    - Sherpa
    - Lhomi
    - Gola
  - Western section (8 groups):
    - Spiti
    - Khunu-Töt
    - Garzha
    - Pangi
    - Paldar
    - Durbuk Jangpa dialect
    - Nyoma Jangpa dialect
    - Jadang (or Dzathang) dialect
  - North-western section (7 groups):
    - Balti
    - Purik
    - Nubra
    - Sham
    - Leh (Central Ladakh)
    - Zanhar
    - Kharu

=== Tournadre (2014) ===
Tournadre (2014) classifies the Tibetic languages as eight geolinguistic continua, consisting of 50 languages and over 200 dialects. This is an updated version of his work in 2008. The Eastern and Southeastern branches have lower internal mutual intelligibility, but it is more limited in the Northwestern branch and between certain southern and northern Khams dialects. These continua are spread across five countries with one exception, this being Sangdam, a Khams dialect in Kachin, Myanmar.

- Tibetic
  - North-Western: Ladakhi, Zangskari, Balti, Purki
  - Western: Spiti, Garzha, Khunu, Jad
  - Central: Dbus, Tsang, Phenpo, Lhokha, Tö, Kongpo (in （Kongpo） with Basum)
  - South-Western: Sherpa and Jirel; other languages/dialects along the Sino-Nepalese border: Humla, Mugu, Dolpo, Lo-ke, Nubri, Tsum, Langtang, Kyirong, Yolmo, Gyalsumdo, Kagate, Lhomi, Walungge, Tokpe Gola.
  - Southern: Dzongkha, Drengjong, Tsamang, Dhromo Lakha, Dur Brokkat, Mera Sakteng Brokpa-ke
  - South-Eastern: Hor Nagchu, Hor Bachen, Yushu, Pembar, Rongdrak, Minyak, Dzayul, Derong-Jol, Chaktreng, Muli-Dappa, Semkyi Nyida
    - 'Northern route' dialects: 'Chamdo (Chab-mdo), Derge (sde-dge), and Kandze (dkar-mdzes)
    - 'Southern route' dialects: Markham (smar-khams), Bathang ('ba'-thang), Lithang (li-thang)
  - Eastern: Drugchu, Khöpokhok, Thewo-Chone, Baima, Sharkhok, Palkyi (or Pashi; four dialects, including Chos-rje), and Zhongu
  - North-Eastern
    - Amdo
    - Gser-Rdo: Gserpa, Khalong

=== Tournadre (2005, 2008) ===
Tournadre (2005) classifies the Tibetic languages as follows.

- Tibetic
  - Central Tibetan
    - The basis of Standard Tibetan that includes various Nepalese varieties
  - Khams
  - Amdo
  - Dzongkha–Lhokä
    - Dzongkha, Sikkimese, Lakha, Naapa, Chocangaca, Brokkat, Brokpa and probably Groma
  - Ladakhi–Balti
    - Ladakhi, Burig, Zangskari, Balti
  - Lahuli–Spiti
  - Kyirong–Kagate
  - Sherpa–Jirel
    - Sherpa, Jirel

The other languages (Thewo-Chone, Zhongu, Khalong, Dongwang, Gserpa, Zitsadegu, Drugchu, Baima) are not mutually intelligible, but are not known well enough to classify. mDungnag, a Tibetan language spoken in Gansu, is also divergent and is not mutually intelligible with either Khams or Amdo.

Tournadre (2013) adds Tseku and Khamba to Khams, and groups Thewo-Chone, Zhongu, and Baima as an Eastern branch of Tibetic.

=== Bradley (1997) ===
According to Bradley, the languages cluster as follows (dialect information from the Tibetan Dialects Project at the University of Bern):

- Tibetic
  - Western Archaic Tibetan (non-tonal), including Ladakhi, Balti and Burig
  - Amdo Tibetan (including Thewo-Chone) (non-tonal)
  - Khams Tibetan (tonal)
  - Western Innovative Tibetan (Lahuli–Spiti) (slightly tonal)
    - Dialects of Upper Ladakh and Zanskar, of the Northwest Indian Border Area (Lahaul and Spiti district and Uttarakhand), and of Zanda County (westernmost Tibet)
  - Central Tibetan (slightly tonal)
    - Most dialects of Ngari Prefecture in western Tibet, of the northern Nepalese border area in Nepal, Tsang dialects of Shigatse Prefecture, and Ü dialects (Lhokha, Lhasa, etc.). The basis of Standard Tibetan.
  - Northern Tibetan (slightly tonal)
    - Dialects of Gêrzê, of Nagqu Prefecture in north-central Tibet, and of Nangqên County in South Qinghai
      (Considered dialects of Khams by Tournadre)
  - Southern Tibetan (slightly tonal)
    - Groma language of Chumbi Valley in southern Tsang, Sikkimese in India, Sherpa and Jirel in Nepal, and various languages of Bhutan:
      Dzongkha, Brokkat, Brokpa, Chocangaca, Lakha, Laya dialect, Lunana dialect.

Other

Some classifications group Khams and Amdo together as Eastern Tibetan (not to be confused with East Bodish, whose speakers are not ethnically Tibetan). Some, like Tournadre, break up Central Tibetan. Phrases such as 'Central Tibetan' and 'Central Bodish' may or may not be synonymous: Southern (Central) Tibetan can be found as Southern Bodish, for example; 'Central Tibetan' may mean dBus or all tonal lects apart from Khams; 'Western Bodish' may be used for the non-tonal western lects while 'Western Tibetan' is used for the tonal lects, or 'Bodish' may even be used for other branches of the Tibeto-Kanauri languages.

=== Lexical similarity ===
Amdo Tibetan has 70% lexical similarity with Central Tibetan and Khams Tibetan, while Khams Tibetan has 80% lexical similarity with Central Tibetan.

== Geographical distribution ==
The Tibetic-speaking area spans six countries: China (PRC), Nepal, Pakistan, India, Bhutan, and Myanmar. Tibetan is also spoken in diaspora communities in Europe, North America (e.g. Little Tibet, Toronto), Asia and Australia.

=== China ===
Within China, the great majority of Tibetic speakers are officially classified into the Tibetan ethnicity which however includes speakers of other Trans-Himalayan languages such as Rgyalrongnic. Aside from Tibet Autonomous Region, there are several autonomous prefectures for the ethnicities in Sichuan, Qinghai, Gansu, and Yunnan.

=== Nepal ===
Lhasa Tibetan, or more technically, Standard Tibetan (natively called སྤྱི་སྐད spyi skad) is used among post-1950s Tibetan emigrants to Nepal. Other Tibetic varieties such as Sherpa, Jirel and Yolmo are spoken in districts along the China-Nepal border.

=== Bhutan ===
The national language of Bhutan is Dzongkha, a Tibetic language originally spoken in the western region. Although non-Tibetic languages (Tshangla, East Bodish) are dominant in many parts of the country, Dzongkha is also widely used there as a second-language. Other Tibetic varieties of Bhutan include Choča-ngača, Brokpa and Lakha.

=== Pakistan ===
Within areas administrated by Pakistan, Balti is spoken in Gilgit-Baltistan.

=== India ===
Within areas administrated by India, some Tibetic varieties are spoken in Ladakh, Sikkim, Himachal Pradesh (Kinnaur, Lahul and Spiti), West Bengal (Darjeeling and Kalimpong), as well as Uttarakhand. As with Bhutan and Nepal, there reside a number of Tibetan refugees across the country, notably in Dharamshala where the headquarters of the Central Tibetan Administration is located.

=== Myanmar ===
In Myanmar, a variant of Khams Tibetan is spoken near the Hkakabo Razi, Kachin State which is adjacent to Nujiang Lisu Autonomous Prefecture, Yunnan and Tibet Autonomous Region. Suzuki (2012) describes the phonology of the Sangdam dialect, as well as giving a brief overview of Tibetic varieties in the country.

He estimates there are about 300 Khams Tibetan speakers inhabiting at least four villages in Dazundam Village Tract, Pannandin Sub-township, Nogmong Township, Putao District, Kachin State. The four villages he mentions are Tahaundam, "Shidudan" (Japanese: シドゥダン), Sandam, Madin, the second of which he provides no romanization because the placename is uncharted on the map available to him. According to Suzuki's consultant, they migrated from Zayu County, Tibet more than a century ago although they still have contact with relatives living there, and there are few differences between the dialects of the four villages .

Since Rawang people are the ethnic majority of the area, the Tibetans also have a command of Rawang, which is mainly used for interethnic communication; those with primary education can speak and write Burmese as well, while they are illiterate in their own language.

== Writing systems ==
Most Tibetic languages are written in one of two Indic scripts. Standard Tibetan and most other Tibetic languages are written in the Tibetan script with a historically conservative orthography (see below) that helps unify the Tibetan-language area. Some other Tibetan languages (in India and Nepal) are written in the related Devanagari script, which is also used to write Hindi, Nepali and many other languages. However, some Ladakhi and Balti speakers write with the Urdu script; this occurs almost exclusively in Pakistan. The Tibetan script fell out of use in Pakistani Baltistan hundreds of years ago upon the region's adoption of Islam. However, increased concern among Balti people for the preservation of their language and traditions, especially in the face of strong Punjabi cultural influence throughout Pakistan, has fostered renewed interest in reviving the Tibetan script and using it alongside the Perso-Arabic script. Many shops in Baltistan's capital Skardu in Pakistan's "Northern Areas" region have begun supplementing signs written in the Perso-Arabic script with signs written in the Tibetan script. Baltis see this initiative not as separatist but rather as part of an attempt to preserve the cultural aspects of their region which has shared a close history with neighbours like Kashmiris and Punjabis since the arrival of Islam in the region many centuries ago.

== Historical phonology ==
Old Tibetan phonology is rather accurately rendered by the script. The finals were pronounced devoiced although they are written as voiced, the prefix letters assimilated their voicing to the root letters. The graphic combinations hr and lh represent voiceless and not necessarily aspirate correspondences to r and l respectively. The letter ' was pronounced as a voiced guttural fricative before vowels but as homorganic prenasalization before consonants. Whether the gigu verso had phonetic meaning or not remains controversial.

For instance, Srongbtsan Sgampo would have been pronounced [sroŋpʦan zɡampo] (now pronounced [sɔ́ŋʦɛ̃ ɡʌ̀mpo] in Lhasa Tibetan) and 'babs would have been pronounced [mbaps] (pronounced [bapˤ] in Lhasa Tibetan).

Already in the 9th century the process of cluster simplification, devoicing and tonogenesis had begun in the central dialects, as can be shown by Tibetan words transliterated into other languages, particularly Middle Chinese but also Uyghur.

The combination of the abovementioned evidence enables us to form the following outline of the evolution of Tibetan. In the 9th century, as shown by the bilingual Tibetan–Chinese treaty of 821–822 found in front of Lhasa's Jokhang, the complex initial clusters had already been reduced, and the process of tonogenesis was likely well underway.

The next change took place in Tsang (Gtsang) dialects: The ra-tags were altered into retroflex consonants, and the ya-tags became palatals.

Later on the superscribed letters and finals d and s disappeared, except in the east and west. It was at this stage that the language spread in Lahul and Spiti, where the superscribed letters were silent, the d and g finals were hardly heard, and as, os, us were pronounced ai, oi, ui. The words introduced from Tibet into the border languages at that time differ greatly from those borrowed at an earlier period.

Other changes are more recent and restricted to Ü and Tsang. In Ü, the vowel sounds a, o, u have now mostly umlauted to ä, ö, ü when followed by the coronal sounds i, d, s, l and n. The same holds for Tsang with the exception of l, which merely lengthens the vowel. The medials have become aspirate tenues with a low intonation, which also marks words having a simple initial consonant; while the former aspirates and the complex initials simplified in speech are uttered with a high tone, shrill and rapidly.

== Reconstruction ==
=== Proto-Tibetic ===
Proto-Tibetic, the hypothetical proto-language ancestral to the Tibetic languages, has been reconstructed by Tournadre (2014). Proto-Tibetic is similar to, but not identical to, written Classical Literary Tibetan. The following phonological features are characteristic of Proto-Tibetic (Tournadre 2014: 113).

- The prefixes *s(ǝ)-, *d(ǝ)-/g(ǝ)-, *m(ǝ)-, and *b(ǝ)-, which have been retained from Proto-Tibeto-Burman. *s(ǝ)- is primarily used with animals and body parts, as well as *d(ǝ)-/*g(ǝ)- and *m(ǝ)-/*r(ǝ)-.
- Palatalization of dental and alveolar consonants before y (/j/).
- Consonant change from lateral to dental position after /m/ (e.g., *ml > *md).
- Distinctive aspirated initial stops. This phenomenon is attested by alternating aspirated and non-aspirated consonants in Old Tibetan orthography. Examples include gcig ~ gchig (གཅིག་ ~ གཆིག་) 'one'; phyin-chad ~ phyin-cad (ཕྱིན་ཆད་ ~ ཕྱིན་ཅད་) 'from now on'; ci ~ chi (ཅི་ ~ ཆི་) 'what'; and cu ~ chu (ཅུ་ ~ ཆུ་) 'water'.

Reconstructed Proto-Tibetic forms from Tournadre (2014) include:

- *g(ǝ)-tɕik 'one'
- *g(ǝ)-nyis 'two'
- *g(ǝ)-su- 'three'
- *b(ǝ)-ʑi 'four'
- *l(ǝ)-ŋa 'five'
- *d(ǝ)-ruk 'six'
- *b(ǝ)-dun 'seven'
- *b(ǝ)-rgyat 'eight'
- *d(ǝ)-gu 'nine'
- *b(ǝ)-tɕu 'ten'
- *s(ǝ)-dik-pa 'scorpion'
- *s(ǝ)-bal 'frog'
- *s(ǝ)-tak 'tiger'
- *s(ǝ)-b-rul 'snake'
- *s(ǝ)-pra 'monkey'
- *s(ǝ)-kra 'hair'
- *s(ǝ)-nyiŋ 'heart'
- *s(ǝ)-na 'nose'
- *d(ǝ)-myik 'eye'
- *m(ǝ)-go 'head'
- *r(ǝ)-na 'ear'

=== Pre-Tibetic ===
Pre-Tibetic is a hypothetical pre-formation stage of Proto-Tibetic.

*ty-, *ly-, *sy- were not palatalized in Pre-Tibetic, but underwent palatalization in Proto-Tibetic (Tournadre 2014: 113-114). Posited sound changes from Pre-Tibetic to Proto-Tibetic include *ty- > *tɕ-, *sy- > *ɕ-, *tsy- > *tɕ-, and *ly- > *ʑ-. However, Tournadre (2014: 114) notes that many Bodish languages such as Basum, Tamang, and Kurtöp (East Bodish) have not undergone these changes (e.g., Bake (Basum) ti 'what' vs. Proto-Tibetic *tɕ(h)i and Bake tɨ 'one' vs. Proto-Tibetic *g(ǝ)-tɕ(h)ik; Kurtöp ^{H}la: 'iron' and Bumthap lak 'iron' vs. Proto-Tibetic *ltɕaks).

Some Pre-Tibetic reconstructions, along with reconstructed Proto-Tibetic forms and orthographic Classical Literary Tibetan, from Tournadre (2014: 114-116) are listed below.

Gloss	Pre-Tibetic	Proto-Tibetic	Classical Literary Tibetan
one	*g(ǝ)-tyik	*g(ǝ)-tɕ(h)ik	gcig / gchig གཅིག་ / གཆིག (Old Tibetan)
big	*tye	*tɕ(h)e	che ཆེ་ (Old Tibetan)
ten	*b(ǝ)-tyu	*b(ǝ)-tɕu	bcu / bchu བཅུ་ / བཆུ་ (Old Tibetan)
what	*tyi	*tɕ(h)i	ci / chi ཅི་ / ཆི་ (Old Tibetan)
flesh	*sya	*ɕa	sha ཤ་
know	*syes	*ɕes	shes ཤེས་
wood	*sying	*ɕiŋ	shing ཤིང་
to cut (past stem)	*b(ǝ)-tsyat	*b(ǝ)-tɕat	bcad བཅད་
spittle	*m(ǝ)-tsyil-ma	*m(ǝ)-tɕ(h)il-ma	mchil-ma མཆིལ་མ་
liver	*m(ǝ)-tsin-pa	*m(ǝ)-tɕ(h)in-pa	mchin-pa མཆིན་པ
four	*b(ǝ)-lyi	*b(ǝ)ʑi	bzhi བཞི་
field	*lying	*ʑiŋ	zhing ཞིང་
flea	*ldi	*ldʑi	lji ལྗི་, 'ji ་འཇི་
iron	*s(ǝ)-lak(s) > *l-sak(s) > *l-tsyak(s)	*ltɕaks	lcags ལྕགས་
arrow		*mda	mda' མདའ་
to suppress	*bnans	*mnans	mnand (Old Tibetan)
to listen	*bnyan	*nyan	mnyand
eye		*d(ǝ)myik	dmyig དམྱིག་ (Old Tibetan); mig
flower		*mentok	men-tog མེན་ཏོག (Old Tibetan); ་me-tog

== Comparison of numerals ==
The numerals in different Tibetan/Tibetic languages are:

GLOSS	Ü-Tsang (Middle)							Amdo	Khams	CLASSICAL TIBETAN
GLOSS	Lhasa	Cheng Zhang	Dolpo	Jirel	Mugom	Sherpa	Yohlmo	Amdo	Khams	CLASSICAL TIBETAN
'1'	ʨiʔ^{53}	ʨi^{53}	ʂik	dokpoi	ʧɪk	ʦɪk^{55}	ʨīː	xʨɨx	ʨi^{55}	*xʨik gtšig
'2'	ȵi^{55}	ȵi^{55}	ɲiː	ŋi	ŋi	ŋi^{55}	ɲìː	ɦȵi	ɲɯ^{53}	*gnis gnis
'3'	sum^{55}	sɔ̃^{53}	sum	sum	sum	sum^{55}	sūm	sɘm	sũ^{53}	*xsum gsum
'4'	ɕi^{13}	ɣɯ^{31}	ɕi̤ː	si	ɕi	ʣi^{55}	ʑì̤	ɦʑɘ	ʐə^{33}	*βʑi bži
'5'	ŋa^{53}	ɴɐ^{53}	ŋa	ŋa	ŋá	ŋɑ^{55}	ŋɑ̀	ɦŋa	ŋɑ^{53}	*ɬŋɑ lŋa
'6'	tʂʰuʔ^{13}	tʂu^{31}	ʈṳk	tʰuk	duk	ɖʊk^{11}	ʈṳ̀ː	tʂəx	tʂo^{33}	*dɽuk drug
'7'	tỹ^{15}	dɛ̃^{24}	ty̤n	duin	dun	dɪn^{55}	t̪ì̤n	ɦdɘn	dĩ^{33}	*βdun bdun
'8'	ɕɛʔ^{13}	dʑe^{31}	ce̤ʔ	get	ket	gæ^{55}	cē̤ː	ɦdʑʲɛ	ʑe^{33}	*βɽgjat brgyad
'9'	ku^{13}	ɡɯ^{31}	kṳ	gu	gu	gu^{55}	kṳ̀	ɦgɘ	gə^{33}	*dgu dgu
'10'	ʨu^{53}	ʨɯ^{53}	tɕu	ʦutʰambaː	ʧú	ʦi^{55}tʰɑm^{11}ba^{11}	ʨʉ̄	ʨɘ	ʨə^{55}	*ɸʨu btšu

For the Central or Eastern Tibetic languages:

GLOSS	Dzongkha-Lakha		Balti-Ladakhi					Spiti bhoti
GLOSS	Dzongkha	Sikkimese	Balti	Changthang	Ladakhi	Purik	Zangskari	Spiti bhoti
'1'	ʨí	ʧi	ʧik	ʧik	ʧik	ʧik	ʧiʔ	ʧík
'2'	ɲí	ni	ɲis	ɲis	ɲis	ɲis	ɲiː	ɲiː
'3'	súm	súm	xsum	sum	sum	sum	sum	súm
'4'	ʃi̤	ʒe	βʒi	zi	zi	ʒi	ʒi	ʒì
'5'	ŋə	ŋa	ɣɑ	ŋa	ʂŋa	ʂŋə	ŋa	ŋá
'6'	dʑo	tʰu	truk	ɖruk	ʈuk	ʈuk	ʈuʔ	ʈùk
'7'	ty̤n	dĩ	βdun	dun	rdun	rdun	ðun	dùn
'8'	kæ̤	gɛ	βgyʌt	gʲat	rgʲat	rgyət	ʝət	ɟèt
'9'	kṳ	go	rgu	gu	rgu	rgu	ɣu	gù
'10'	ʨu tʰam	ʧɔːmba	ɸʧu	ʧu	rʧu	rču	ʧu	ʧú
