= Voiced retroflex trill =

Consonantal sound represented by ⟨ɽr⟩ in IPA

ɽ͡r
- IPA number: 125 674 122

Audio sample
- source · help

Encoding
- Entity (decimal): &#637;&#865;&#114;
- Unicode (hex): U+027D U+0361 U+0072
- X-SAMPA: r`r

A voiced retroflex trill is a contour consonant with the duration of a single segment. Although the tongue starts out in a subapical retroflex position, trilling involves the tip of the tongue and causes it to move forward to the alveolar ridge. Thus, the retroflex trill gives a preceding vowel retroflex coloration, like other retroflex consonants, but the vibration itself is not much different from an alveolar trill. This has been reported in Toda and confirmed with laboratory measurements.

Peter Ladefoged transcribes it with the IPA letter that is defined as a retroflex flap, ⟨ɽ⟩, in broad transcription. In narrower transcription ⟨ɽ͡r⟩ is appropriate.

Other languages reported to have an (apico-)retroflex trill are Wintu and Lardil. In these languages the tip of the tongue approaches the hard palate, but the articulation is not subapical as it is in Toda. The trill has a retroflex flap allophone that occurs between vowels.

Several languages have been reported to have trilled retroflex affricates, such as [ɳɖ͡ɽ̝] and [ʈ͡ɽ̝̊], including Mapudungun, Malagasy, Fijian, and Baima. However, the exact articulation is rarely clear from descriptions. In Fijian, for example, subsequent investigation revealed that the sound (orthographic dr) is rarely trilled, but is usually realized as a postalveolar stop [n̠d̠] instead. In Mapudungun, the sound (orthographic tr) is strongly retroflex, causing /l/ and /r/ following the subsequent vowel to become retroflex as well. The southern dialect varies between /ʈɽ/ and /ʈʂ/, but it is not clear whether the letter ⟨ɽ⟩ is intended to represent a flap, a trill, or a non-sibilant fricative.

== Occurrence ==
Language		Word	IPA	Meaning	Notes
Dutch	North Brabant	riem	[ɽrim]	'belt'	A rare variant of /r/, which occurs almost exclusively word-initially. Realization of /r/ varies considerably among dialects. See Dutch phonology
Dutch	North Holland	riem	[ɽrim]	'belt'	A rare variant of /r/, which occurs almost exclusively word-initially. Realization of /r/ varies considerably among dialects. See Dutch phonology
Scottish Gaelic	Bernera	rèidh	[ɽrˠɛː]	'flat, even'	Velarized; dialectal realization of /rˠ/. Weakly trilled and can be partially devoiced in initial or final positions.
Toda		[kaɽr]		'pen for calves'	Subapical but not purely retroflex. Although the tongue starts out in a sub-apical retroflex position, trilling involves the tip of the tongue, and this causes it to move forward toward the alveolar ridge. This means that the retroflex trill gives a preceding vowel retroflex coloration the way other retroflex consonants do, but that the vibration itself is not much different from the other trills. Toda contrasts plain and palatalized fronted alveolar, alveolar and retroflex trills.
Wintu		boloy nor-toror	[boloj noɽr toɽoɽr]	'(ridge on a trail from Hayfork to Hyampom)'	Apico-postalveolar. Occurs as [ɽ] when intervocalic.

== Notes ==
Place →	Labial					Coronal										Dorsal					Laryngeal			
Manner ↓	Bilabial		Labiodental		Linguolabial		Dental		Alveolar		Postalveolar		Retroflex		(Alveolo-)palatal		Velar		Uvular		Pharyngeal/epiglottal		Glottal	
Nasal	m̥	m	ɱ̊	ɱ		n̼	n̪̊	n̪	n̥	n	n̠̊	n̠	ɳ̊	ɳ	ɲ̊	ɲ	ŋ̊	ŋ	ɴ̥	ɴ				
Plosive	p	b	p̪	b̪	t̼	d̼	t̪	d̪	t	d			ʈ	ɖ	c	ɟ	k	ɡ	q	ɢ	ʡ		ʔ	
Sibilant affricate							t̪s̪	d̪z̪	ts	dz	t̠ʃ	d̠ʒ	tʂ	dʐ	tɕ	dʑ								
Non-sibilant affricate	pɸ	bβ	p̪f	b̪v			t̪θ	d̪ð	tɹ̝̊	dɹ̝	t̠ɹ̠̊˔	d̠ɹ̠˔			cç	ɟʝ	kx	ɡɣ	qχ	ɢʁ	ʡʜ	ʡʢ	ʔh	
Sibilant fricative							s̪	z̪	s	z	ʃ	ʒ	ʂ	ʐ	ɕ	ʑ								
Non-sibilant fricative	ɸ	β	f	v	θ̼	ð̼	θ	ð	θ̠	ð̠	ɹ̠̊˔	ɹ̠˔	ɻ̊˔	ɻ˔	ç	ʝ	x	ɣ	χ	ʁ	ħ	ʕ	h	ɦ
Approximant		β̞		ʋ				ð̞		ɹ		ɹ̠		ɻ		j		ɰ						˷
Tap/flap		ⱱ̟		ⱱ					ɾ̥	ɾ			ɽ̊	ɽ						ɢ̆		ʡ̆		
Trill	ʙ̥	ʙ							r̥	r		r̠	ɽ̊r̥	ɽr					ʀ̥	ʀ	ʜ	ʢ		
Lateral affricate									tɬ	dɮ			tꞎ	d𝼅	c𝼆	ɟʎ̝	k𝼄	ɡʟ̝						
Lateral fricative							ɬ̪		ɬ	ɮ			ꞎ	𝼅	𝼆	ʎ̝	𝼄	ʟ̝						
Lateral approximant								l̪	l̥	l		l̠	ɭ̊	ɭ	ʎ̥	ʎ	ʟ̥	ʟ		ʟ̠				
Lateral tap/flap									ɺ̥	ɺ			𝼈̊	𝼈		ʎ̆		ʟ̆						

		BL	LD	D	A	PA	RF	P	V	U
Implosive	Voiced	ɓ			ɗ		ᶑ	ʄ	ɠ	ʛ
Implosive	Voiceless	ɓ̥			ɗ̥		ᶑ̊	ʄ̊	ɠ̊	ʛ̥
Ejective	Stop	pʼ			tʼ		ʈʼ	cʼ	kʼ	qʼ
Ejective	Affricate		p̪fʼ	t̪θʼ	tsʼ	t̠ʃʼ	tʂʼ	tɕʼ	kxʼ	qχʼ
Ejective	Fricative	ɸʼ	fʼ	θʼ	sʼ	ʃʼ	ʂʼ	ɕʼ	xʼ	χʼ
Ejective	Lateral affricate				tɬʼ			c𝼆ʼ	k𝼄ʼ	q𝼄ʼ
Ejective	Lateral fricative				ɬʼ					
Click (top: velar; bottom: uvular)	Tenuis	kʘ qʘ		kǀ qǀ	kǃ qǃ		k𝼊 q𝼊	kǂ qǂ		
Click (top: velar; bottom: uvular)	Voiced	ɡʘ ɢʘ		ɡǀ ɢǀ	ɡǃ ɢǃ		ɡ𝼊 ɢ𝼊	ɡǂ ɢǂ		
Click (top: velar; bottom: uvular)	Nasal	ŋʘ ɴʘ		ŋǀ ɴǀ	ŋǃ ɴǃ		ŋ𝼊 ɴ𝼊	ŋǂ ɴǂ	ʞ	
Click (top: velar; bottom: uvular)	Tenuis lateral				kǁ qǁ					
Click (top: velar; bottom: uvular)	Voiced lateral				ɡǁ ɢǁ					
Click (top: velar; bottom: uvular)	Nasal lateral				ŋǁ ɴǁ					
