= Tibeto-Kanauri languages =

Proposed language group

Tibeto-Kanauri
- Bodic, Bodish–Himalayish; Western Tibeto-Burman
- (proposed)
- Geographic distribution: Nepal, Tibet, Northeast India and other neighboring areas
- Linguistic classification: Sino-Tibetan: Tibeto-Burman; Tibeto-Kanauri
- Subdivisions: Bodish (including Tamangic); West Himalayish; Gongduk

Language codes
- Glottolog: bodi1256

The Tibeto-Kanauri languages, also called Bodic, Bodish–Himalayish, and Western Tibeto-Burman, are a proposed intermediate level of classification of the Sino-Tibetan languages, centered on the Tibetic languages and the Kinnauri dialect cluster. The conception of the relationship, or if it is even a valid group, varies between researchers.

== Conceptions of Tibeto-Kanauri ==
Western Tibeto-Burman languages, largely following Thurgood and La Polla (2003).

Benedict (1972) originally posited the Tibeto-Kanauri aka Bodish–Himalayish relationship, but had a more expansive conception of Himalayish than generally found today, including Qiangic, Magaric, and Lepcha. Within Benedict's conception, Tibeto-Kanauri is one of seven linguistic nuclei, or centers of gravity along a spectrum, within Tibeto-Burman languages. The center-most nucleus identified by Benedict is the Jingpho language (including perhaps the Kachin–Luic and Tamangic languages); other peripheral nuclei besides Tibeto-Kanauri include the Kiranti languages (Bahing–Vayu and perhaps the Newar language); the Tani languages; the Bodo–Garo languages and perhaps the Konyak languages); the Kukish languages (Kuki–Naga plus perhaps the Karbi language, the Meitei language and the Mru language); and the Burmish languages (Lolo-Burmese languages, perhaps also the Nung language and Trung).

Matisoff (1978, 2003) largely follows Benedict's scheme, stressing the teleological value of identifying related characteristics over mapping detailed family trees in the study of Tibeto-Burman and Sino-Tibetan languages. Matisoff includes Bodish and West Himalayish with the Lepcha language as a third branch. He unites these at a higher level with Mahakiranti as Himalayish.

Van Driem (2001) notes that the Bodish, West Himalayish, and Tamangic languages (but not Benedict's other families) appear to have a common origin.

Bradley (1997) takes much the same approach but words things differently: he incorporates Bodish, Tshangla, and West Himalayan as constituting a single branch, which thus becomes close to Tibeto-Kanauri. This and his other branch containing both Central Himalayan and Kiranti constitute his Bodic family.
