= Bodish languages =

Proposed language grouping

Bodish
- Geographic distribution: Tibetan Plateau
- Linguistic classification: Sino-Tibetan: Tibeto-Kanauri?; Bodish
- Subdivisions: Tibetic; East Bodish; West Bodish; Tshangla

Language codes
- Glottolog: bodi1257

Bodish, named for the Tibetan ethnonym Bod, is a proposed grouping consisting of the Tibetic languages and associated Sino-Tibetan languages spoken in Tibet, North India, Nepal, Bhutan, and North Pakistan. It has not been demonstrated that all these languages form a clade, characterized by shared innovations, within Sino-Tibetan.

Shafer, who coined the term "Bodish", used it for two different levels in his classification, called "section" and "branch" respectively:

- Bodish
  - Bodish
    - West Bodish
    - Central Bodish
    - South Bodish (Note: Similar to Dzongkha–Lhokä in Tournadre (2005, 2008) and Dzongkhic in Glottolog v5.3.)
    - East Bodish
  - Gurung (Tamangic)
  - Tshangla
  - Rgyalrongic

It is now generally accepted that the languages Shafer placed in the first three subgroups are all descended from Old Tibetan, and should be combined as a Tibetic subgroup, with the East Bodish languages as a sister subgroup. More recent classifications omit Rgyalrongic, which is considered a separate branch of Sino-Tibetan.

Bradley (1997) also defined a broad "Bodish" group, adding the West Himalayish languages, which Shafer treated as a sibling of his Bodish section. The resulting grouping is roughly equivalent to the "Tibeto-Kanauri" group in other classifications. Within this grouping, Bodish proper is a subgroup with two branches, Tibetic and East Bodish:

- Bodish
      - Central Bodish (Tibetic)
      - East Bodish
    - West Bodish (Tamangic)
  - Tshangla, Lhokpu, Gongduk
  - West Himalayish

East Bodish is among the least researched branches of Sino-Tibetan. Languages regarded as members of this family include Bumthang (Michailovsky and Mazaudon 1994; van Driem 1995), Tshangla (Hoshi 1987; Andvik 1999), Dakpa (Lu 1986; Sun et al. 1991), Zhangzhung (Nagano and LaPolla 2001), and maybe Zakhring (Blench & Post 2011).

According to Shafer, East Bodish is the most conservative branch of the Bodish languages.

As for grammars of the East Bodish languages, there is Das Gupta (1968) and Lu (2002). Some papers on Kurtöp include Hyslop (2008a, 2008b, 2009).
