= Humla Tibetan language =

Sino-Tibetan language of western Nepal

Humla Tibetan
- Native to: Nepal
- Ethnicity: Tibetan
- Native speakers: 5,000 (2014)
- Language family: Sino-Tibetan: Tibeto-Burman; Western Tibeto-Burman Tibeto-Kanauri; Central Bodish; Central Tibetic; Humla Tibetan
- Dialects: Upper Humla; Lower Humla; Eastern Humla; Limi

Language codes
- ISO 639-3: hut
- Glottolog: huml1238 Humla
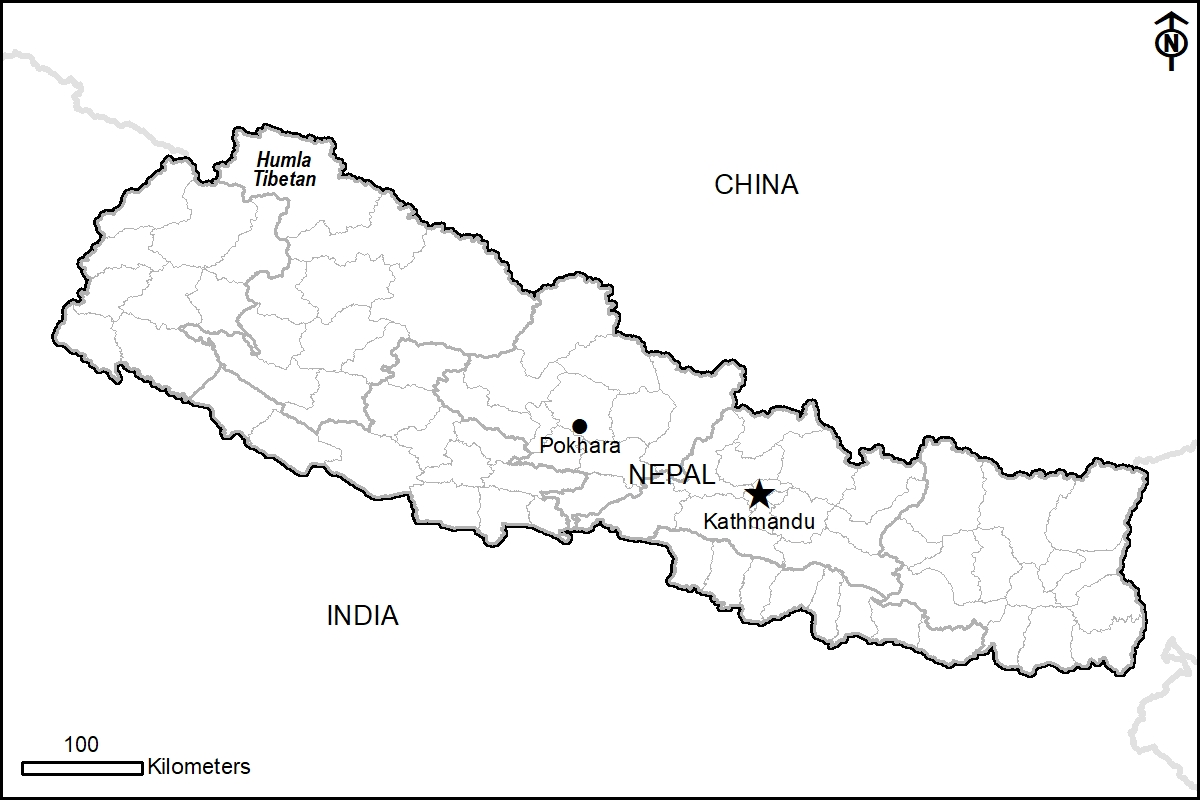
- Coordinates: 30.051394, 81.700777

Humla Tibetan, also known as Humla Bhotiya, and Humli Tamang, is the Sino-Tibetan language of the Tibetan people of Humla district in Nepal (ISO 639-3: [hut], GlottoCode: [huml1238]).

== Language name ==
Humla Tibetan speakers self-identify using general ethnic terms such as Bhote, Tibetan, Tamang, Lama, and Kham. This has led scholars to assign a variety of language names to the speech of these people (Humla Tibetan, Humla Bhotiya, and Humli Tamang). As Humla Tibetan speakers refer to their language either in general terms or at the level of village dialect, no truly native glottonym can be assigned to the Tibetic language spoken in this district.

== Language classification ==
Humla Tibetan (Humli Tamang) is classified as: Sino-Tibetan, Tibeto-Burman, Western Tibeto-Burman, Bodish, Central Bodish, Central (Tibetan), and mNgahris. It is one of fifteen related languages that Tournadre classifies as South-western Tibetic under Old Tibetan, all of which are spoken in Nepal. These closely related languages are as follows: Mugom-Karmarong (ISO 639-3: muk), Dolpo (ISO 639-3: dre), Gyalsumdo (ISO 639-3: gyo), Hyolmo (ISO 639-3: scp), Jirel (ISO 639-3: jul]), Kyirong (ISO 639-3: kgy), Lhomi (ISO 639-3: lhm), Lhowa ISO 639-3: loy), Nubri (ISO 639-3: kte), Sherpa (ISO 639-3: xsr), Syuba (ISO 639-3: syw), Tichurong (ISO 639-3: tcn), Tsum (ISO 639-3: ttz), Walungge (ISO 639-3: ola).

== Speakers ==
Humla Tibetan is spoken by roughly 5,000 people originating from the Namkha and Simkot municipalities of Humla district of Nepal, along the Humla Karnali River. Diaspora communities of Humla Tibetan can be found in the capital city of Kathmandu (Bouddha).

== Dialects ==
At least four dialects of Humla Tibetan have been identified. Various authors use different names to distinguish between groups/varieties, generally related to geographical location. Speakers often self-identify using village or dialect-specific names, and these are usually unrelated to the names scholars attribute to these sub-groups. A semi-nomadic group, the Humli Khyampa, also lives and travels in the Humla district. The relationship between the language spoken by Humla Tibetans and the language of the Humli Khyampa is unclear, though Wilde lists it as a possible fifth dialect of Humla Tibetan, saying that some speakers believe it is related and mutually intelligible. The various names of the four sub-groups are present in the following table.

=== Humla Tibetan groups/varieties ===
| von Fürer-Haimendorf | Wilde | de Vries | Lama | Self-identification |
|---|---|---|---|---|
| Satthapale | Upper Humla | Upper Humla | Yultsodunba | Sakyako bhasa, tukchu bhasa, tsangkat |
| Syandephale, Panchsati | La Yakpa | Lower Humla | Tugchulungba | Sarak khalu |
| Barthapale | Nyinba | Eastern Humla | Bara-Thapalya | Nyinba |
| Limi | Limi | Limi | Limya(l) | Limike, limi, limi khalu, limi lap, limi kecha |

=== Lexical similarity between Humla Tibetan varieties ===
| Varieties | Lexical Similarity |
|---|---|
| Limi & Upper Humla | 79% |
| Limi & Lower Humla | 82% |
| Limi & Eastern Humla | 74-77% |
| Upper Humla & Lower Humla | 79-85% |
| Upper Humla & Eastern Humla | 73-77% |
| Lower Humla & Eastern Humla | 76-82% |

== Language vitality ==
In 2014, a sociolinguistic study found that Humla Tibetan is used extensively in all domains of daily life in their native villages. Ninety-three percent of participants said their first language was their own Humla Tibetan variety. The study also found that local Humla Tibetan was being transmitted to children. Ethnologue has assigned EGIDS level 6a “vigorous” to Humla Tibetan (ISO 639-3 hut). However, the Atlas of the world's languages in danger, 3rd edition has Limirong (Limi valley Tibetan) listed as (DE) Definitely endangered.

== Resources ==
- Language documentation: Greninger, David E. (2014). Preliminary Documentation of the Humla Tibetan Language. Report submitted to Centre for International Relations and Central Department of Linguistics, Tribhuvan University, Kirtipur, Nepal. Ms.
- Language documentation: Greniger, David E. (2018). Text Interlinearization and Glossary Production in the Limi Dialect of Humla Tibetan. Report submitted to Centre for International Relations and Central Department of Linguistics, Tribhuvan University, Kirtipur, Nepal. ms.
- Phonology: Greniger, David E. (2021). Preliminary Segmental Phonology and Glossary Production in the Nyinba Subdialect of Humla Tibetan. Report submitted to Centre for International Relations and Central Department of Linguistics, Tribhuvan University, Kirtipur, Nepal. ms.
- Phonology: Wilde, Christopher Pekka. (2001). Preliminary phonological analysis of the Limi dialect of Humla Bhotiya. (MA thesis, University of Helsinki; 91pp.)
- Sociolinguistic study: de Vries, Klaas. 2014. A sociolinguistic survey of Humla Tibetan in Northwest Nepal. Kathmandu: Linguistic Survey of Nepal (LinSuN), Central Department of Linguistics, Tribhuvan University, Nepal.
