= Lhowa language =

Sino-Tibetan language of western Nepal

Lhowa
- Loke Tibetan
- Native to: Nepal
- Ethnicity: Tibetan people
- Native speakers: 8,800 (2012)
- Language family: Sino-Tibetan: Tibeto-Burman; Western Tibeto-Burman Tibeto-Kanauri; Bodish; Central Bodish; Lhowa
- Dialects: Upper Mustang; Lower Mustang (Bahragaunle)

Language codes
- ISO 639-3: loy
- Glottolog: lowa1242
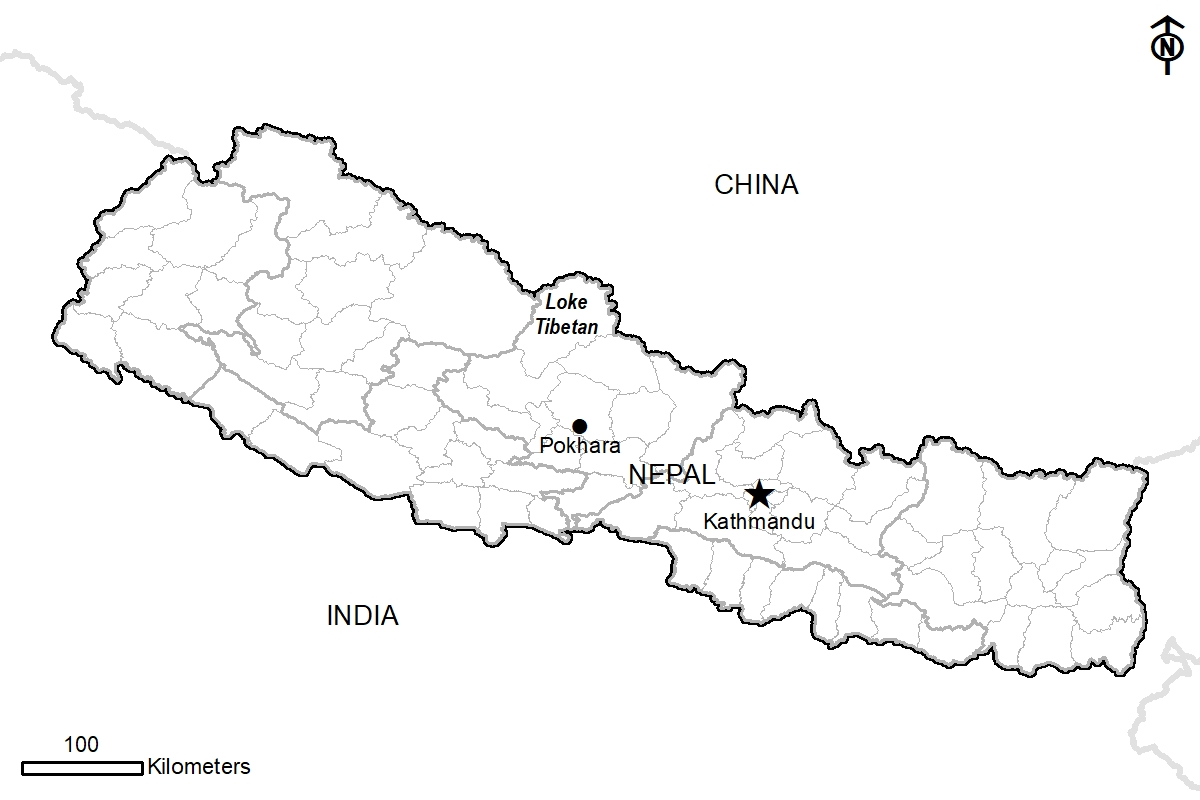

Lhowa (ल्होवा), also known as Loke Tibetan, Mustang Tibetan and Lhopa is a Sino-Tibetan language spoken by approximately 3,000 Tibetan people of Mustang District in central Nepal (ISO 639-3: loy, GlottoCode: lowa1242).

== Language name ==
Speakers of Lhowa in Lomanthang municipality (Upper Mustang) identify themselves as Lopa, Loba, or Lowa, ‘people of Lo’ and their languages as Lo-ke or Glo-skad, ‘language of Lo’. Speakers in the Bahragaun Muktichhetra municipality (Lower Mustang) often refer to their speech simply as Jhardzong 'our language,' or by village names with the word -ke ‘language’. There is no single term that is used for all varieties of the language and is accepted by all speakers. Alternatively, the language is also referred to as Bhote Bhasa, though this is a Nepali designation.

== Language classification ==
Lhowa is one of fifteen languages in the South-western Tibetic group of Nepal. It is classified as Sino-Tibetan, Tibeto-Burman, Western Tibeto–Burman, Bodish, Central Bodish, Central (Tibetan), gTsang. Closely related languages in this group include Humla [hut], Mugom-Karmarong [muk] and Dolpo [dre] to the west, as well as Gyalsumdo [gyo], Hyolmo [scp], Jirel [jul], Kyerong [kgy], Lhomi [lhm], Nubri [kte], Sherpa [xsr], Syuba [syw], Tichurong [tcn], Tsum [ttz], and Walungge [ola] to the east.

== Speakers ==
According to the national census in 2011, there were 3,029 self-identified mother tongue speakers of Lhopa in Nepal, 2,921 of which lived in the district of Mustang at the time of the census. 2,624 people self-identified as being part of the Lhopa ethnic group in the same census. The total population of Loke Tibetan speakers worldwide is estimated to be 8,800 people, including those living in diaspora in India and the United States.

== Dialects ==
There are two main varieties of Mustang Tibetan, one spoken in Upper Mustang (Lo-ke) and the other spoken in Bahragaun (Bahragaunle). Although there is a high level of intelligibility between them, speakers of these two varieties refer to themselves and their language with distinct terms. The varieties exhibit 79-88% lexical similarity, and according to dialect intelligibility tests speakers demonstrate 92–96% comprehension of audio texts from opposite varieties.

== Language vitality ==
Lhowa is nationally recognized as a language of indigenous identity in Nepal, listed as Lhopa. A sociolinguistic survey of Mustang published in 2003 found that Loke Tibetan is used in all domains of life, there is intergenerational transmission, and speakers place high value on their language and its use. At the time, speakers expressed a desire to develop their language for reading and writing. Since then, an online dictionary, an alphabet book (using Devanagari script), and various other written materials have been produced (see Resources).

Internet sources conflict about the vitality status of Lhowa. The Ethnologue classifies Loke Tibetan as 6a "vigorous" on the EGIDS, denoting a situation in which the language is not losing speakers. However, the third edition of the Atlas of the World's Languages in Danger lists the language as "definitely endangered," indicating that the language is no longer learned as the first language in the home.

== Resources ==
- Alphabet: Lhomi, Chhing Chippa. & Lhomi, Shangbu. (2010). Lhowa alphabet. Kathmandu: Himalayan Indigenous Society. https://www.sil.org/resources/archives/42089
- Alphabet: Lhomi, Chhing Chippa. & Lhomi, Shangbu. (2010). Lhowa alphabet. Kathmandu: Himalayan Indigenous Society. https://www.sil.org/resources/archives/42089
- Dictionary: https://www.webonary.org/lhowa/
- Dictionary: https://www.webonary.org/lhowa/
- Lowa proverbs: Lowa, N., Lowa, B., & Lowa, P. (2011). धाङबी पेले धेन्‍दा मेक. ms. https://www.sil.org/resources/archives/52871
- Lowa proverbs: Lowa, N., Lowa, B., & Lowa, P. (2011). धाङबी पेले धेन्‍दा मेक. ms. https://www.sil.org/resources/archives/52871
- Lowa songs: Lowa, N., Lowa, B., & Lowa, P. (2010). Lowa Traditional Songs. ms. https://www.sil.org/resources/archives/52872
- Lowa songs: Lowa, N., Lowa, B., & Lowa, P. (2010). Lowa Traditional Songs. ms. https://www.sil.org/resources/archives/52872
- Math primer: Lhomi, Chhing Chippa. & Lhomi, Shangbu. (2012). Lowa Primer Math. ms. https://www.sil.org/resources/archives/52636
- Math primer: Lhomi, Chhing Chippa. & Lhomi, Shangbu. (2012). Lowa Primer Math. ms. https://www.sil.org/resources/archives/52636
- Sociolinguistic study: Japola, M., Marcuson, L., & Marcuson, M. (2003). Mustang Survey: A Sociolinguistic Study of Tibetan-related Language Varieties Spoken in Upper Mustang and Bahragaun Areas. Journal of Language Survey Reports 2021.
- Grammar study: Dhakal, Dubi Nanda. (2017a). Lowa Case Markers in Comparative Perspective. The Journal of University Grants Commission 6. 16–28.
- Grammar study: Dhakal, Dubi Nanda. (2017b). Causative constructions in Lhomi, Gyalsumdo, Nubri, and Lowa. Gipan 3. 65–82.

== Phonology ==
Lhowa is a verb-final language with a split-ergative case system and differential object marking (animate vs. inanimate). The ergative marker is also used for both instrumental and genitive case, and the accusative marker is used for both the dative and locative case. Lhowa exhibits five different ways to make causative constructions: labile verbs, suppletion, morphological changes, phonological changes, and periphrastic causatives.

=== (Possible) consonant phonemes ===
	Bilabial		Alveolar		Postalveolar		Retroflex		Palatal	Velar		Glottal	
Plosive	p	b	t	d			ʈ	ɖ		k	g	ʔ	
Plosive	pʰ		tʰ				ʈʰ			kʰ		ʔ	
Fricative			s	(z)	(ʃ)							h	ɦ
Affricate			t͡s	d͡z	t͡ʃ	d͡ʒ							
Affricate			t͡sʰ		t͡ʃʰ								
Nasal	m		n						ɳ	ŋ			
Flap			ɾ										
Approximant			l						j	w			
Approximant			l̥	r̥					j	w			

=== (Possible) Vowel Phonemes ===
	Front	Central	Back
Close	i – y/ü	(ʉ)	u
Close-mid	e – ø/ö	(ɵ)	o
Near-open	(æ)		
Open		a	

Nagano lists /ä, ü, ö/ as "palatalized" /a, u, o/ respectively. It is unclear which system was used to transcribe these vowel phones. The most likely phones being referred to are /æ, y, ø/. Alternatives are in parentheses.
