= Mugom–Karmarong language =

Sino-Tibetan language of western Nepal

Mugom–Karmarong
- Native to: Nepal
- Ethnicity: Mugali, Karani
- Native speakers: 7,500 (2012)
- Language family: Sino-Tibetan: Tibeto-Burman; Western Tibeto-Burman Tibeto-Kanauri; Bodish; Central Bodish; Central Tibetic; Mugom–Karmarong
- Dialects: Mugom; Karmarong

Language codes
- ISO 639-3: muk
- Glottolog: mugo1238 Mugom
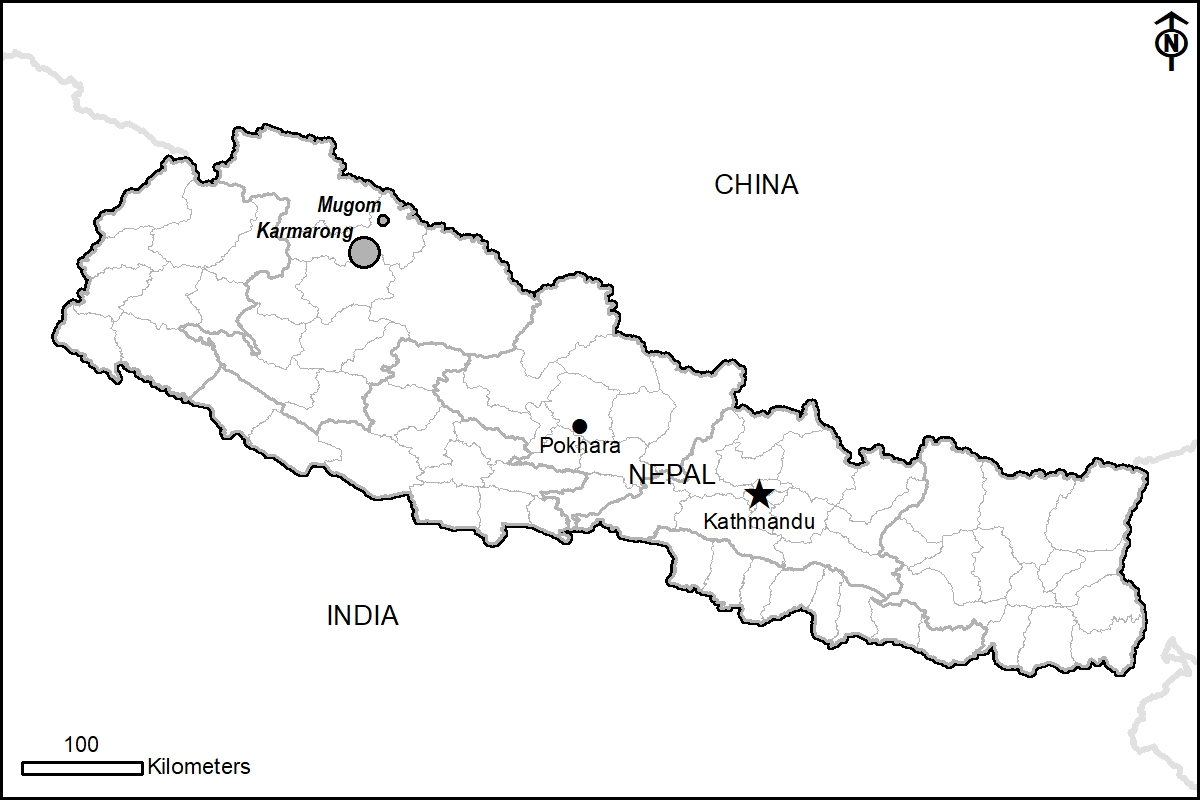

Mugom–Karmarong is the Sino-Tibetan language variety of the Tibetan people of Mugu district in Nepal. This language variety represents two dialects Mugom and Karmarong, which are spoken by distinct ethnicities and are separate languages in the perceptions of these groups. Based on census data taken in 2011, the total population of Mugom–Karmarong is estimated to be about 7,500 speakers.

== Language identity ==
Speakers have two distinct ethnic identities Mugali and Karani, and therefore perceive that they speak two different but related languages; Mugom language and Karmarong language. These two languages are mutually intelligible and are about 85% lexically similar. Intelligibility testing between the two varieties indicated that the Mugali and Karani can understand each others speech.

== Language classification ==
Mugom–Karmarong is traditionally classified as Tibeto-Burman, Western Tibeto-Burman, Bodish, Central Bodish, Central (Tibetic). It has been further identified with both the gTsang and mNgahris sub-groups of Central (Tibetan) at various times. These subgroups are names of Central Tibetan dialects associated with Lhasa and Ngari of the Tibetan Autonomous Region (TAR), respectively. Tournadre uses the term "Tibetic" as a sub-level classification referring to languages descended from Old Tibetan, grouped into 8 geographic categories. Under this more simplified classification, Mugom–Karmarong can be identified under Old Tibetan as South-Western Tibetic. Closely related languages in this group include Humla to the west and Dolpo to the east, the closest geographically, as well as Gyalsumdo, Hyolmo, Jirel, Kyerong, Lhomi, Lhowa, Nubri, Sherpa, Syuba, Tichurong, Tsum, Walungge.
