= Sherpa language =

Tibetic language

Sherpa
- स्यर्पी के śērwī tamṅē ཤར་པའི་སྐད shar pa'i skad yig
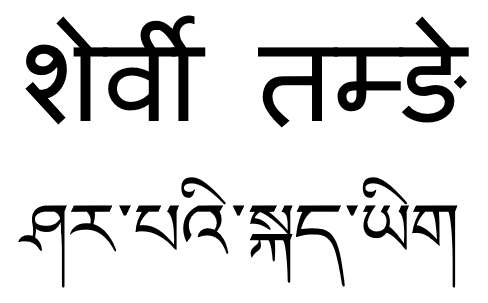
- 'Sherpa' in Devanagari and Tibetan scripts
- Native to: Nepal, India, China, Bhutan,
- Region: Nepal, Sikkim, Bhutan, Xizang, USA
- Ethnicity: Sherpa
- Native speakers: 260,000 (2011 & 2021 census)
- Language family: Sino-Tibetan: Tibeto-Burman; Tibeto-Kanauri (?); Bodish; Tibetic; Southern Tibetic; Sherpa
- Writing system: Tibetan, Devanagari

Official status
- Official language in: Nepal India: Sikkim

Language codes
- ISO 639-3: xsr
- Glottolog: sher1255
- ELP: Sherpa

Sherpa (also Sharpa, Sherwa, or Xiaerba), Sherpa: ཤར་པའི་སྐད Wylie (shar pa'i skad) is a Tibetic language spoken in Nepal and the Indian state of Sikkim, mainly by the Sherpa. The majority of speakers of the Sherpa language live in the Khumbu region of Nepal, spanning from the Chinese (Tibetan) border in the east to the Bhotekosi River in the west. About 245,000 speakers live in Nepal (2021 census), some 25,000 in Sikkim, India (2011), 11,000 speakers live in Bhutan and some 47,000 in the Tibetan Autonomous Region (2020). Sherpa is a subject-object-verb (SOV) language. Sherpa is predominantly a spoken language, although it is occasionally written using either the Devanagari or Tibetan script.

== Geographical distribution ==
Sherpa is spoken east of the Himalayan region in Nepal Langtang (Rasuwa district) to Olangchungola (Taplejung District) in the following districts of Nepal (Ethnologue).

- Koshi Province
  - Solukhumbu District
  - Okhaldhunga District
  - Sankhuwasabha District
  - Taplejung District
  - Ilam District
  - Bhojpur District
- Bagmati Province
  - Ramechhap District
  - Dolakha District
  - Sindhupalchowk District
  - Rasuwa District

== Classification ==
Sherpa belongs to the Tibetic branch of the Tibeto-Burman family. It is closely related to Central Tibetan, Jirel, Humla, Mugom, Dolpo, Lo-ke, Nubri, Tsum, Langtang, Kyirong, Yolmo, Gyalsumdo, Kagate, Lhomi, Walung, and Tokpe Gola. The Sherpa language has five closely related dialects, these being Solu, Khumbu, Pharak, Dram, and Sikkimese Sherpa.

== Phonology ==
Sherpa is a tonal language. Sherpa has the following consonants:

=== Consonants ===
		Labial	Dental	Alveolar	Retroflex	Palato- alveolar	Palatal	Velar	Glottal
Nasal		m ⟨མ m⟩		n ⟨ན n⟩			ɲ ⟨ཉ ny⟩	ŋ ⟨ང ng⟩	
Plosive/ Affricate	voiceless	p ⟨པ p⟩	t̪ ⟨ཏ t⟩	t͡s ⟨ཙ ts⟩	ʈ ⟨ཊ ṭ⟩	t͡ʃ ⟨ཅ c⟩	c ⟨ཀྱ ky⟩	k ⟨ཀ k⟩	
Plosive/ Affricate	aspirated	pʰ ⟨ཕ ph⟩	t̪ʰ ⟨ཐ th⟩	t͡sʰ ⟨ཚ tsh⟩	ʈʰ ⟨ཋ ṭh⟩	t͡ʃʰ ⟨ཆ ch⟩	cʰ ⟨ཁྱ khy⟩	kʰ ⟨ཁ kh⟩	
Plosive/ Affricate	voiced	b ⟨བ b⟩	d̪ ⟨ད d⟩	d͡z ⟨ཛ dz⟩	ɖ ⟨ཌ ḍ⟩	d͡ʒ ⟨ཇ j⟩	ɟ ⟨གྱ gy⟩	ɡ ⟨ག g⟩	
Fricative				s ⟨ས s⟩		ʃ ⟨ཤ sh⟩			h ⟨ཧ h⟩
Liquid	voiceless		l̪̥ ⟨ལྷ lh⟩	ɾ̥ ⟨ཧྲ hr⟩					
Liquid	voiced		l̪ ⟨ལ l⟩	ɾ ⟨ར r⟩					
Semivowel		w ⟨ཝ w⟩					j ⟨ཡ y⟩		

- Stop sounds /p, t̪, ʈ, k/ can be unreleased [p̚, t̪̚, ʈ̚, k̚] in word-final position.
- Palatal sounds /c cʰ ɟ/ can neutralize to velar sounds [k kʰ ɡ] when preceding /i, e, ɛ/.
- /n/ can become a retroflex nasal [ɳ] when preceding a retroflex stop.
- /p/ can have an allophone of [ɸ] when occurring in fast speech.
- /l/ and /r/ are devoiced at the end of a word or before a consonant.

=== Vowels ===
	Front		Back	
	oral	nasal	oral	nasal
High	i	ĩ	u	ũ
Mid-high	e	ẽ	o	õ
Mid-low	ɛ	ɛ̃	ɔ	ɔ̃
Low	a	ã	ʌ	ʌ̃

- Vowel sounds /i, u/ have the allophones [ɪ, ʊ] when between consonants and in closed syllables.

=== Tones ===
There are four distinct tones; high /v́/, high falling /v̂/, low /v̀/, and low rising /v̌/. Regardless of the regular tone of the word, the last syllable of a question is to be pronounced with a rising tone.

== Grammar ==
=== Verbs ===
Verb stems are modified for aspect and mood. The imperfective and perfective aspects and the volitional (whether an action was intentional), infinitive, disjunct, and imperative (commands) moods are differentiated. In verb suffixes, the infinitive, disjunct (action not intended or not known to be intended), past observational, mirative (speaker's surprise), volitional, augmentative (greater intensity), participle, durative (action lasts through an extended time), hortative (plural imperative), dictative (narrating a story), descentive, ablative, and locative are distinguished. A verb stem may take on up to three suffixes. The perfective and imperfective aspects are often treated as past and non-past tenses, respectively. The labels "locative" and "ablative" do not refer to the function of the aspect but rather the homomorphous case-like clitic of the same name. Sherpa is strictly verb-final.

Aspect-mood suffixes
Form	Suffix
Infinitive	-u/-p
Disjunct/Hortative	-(k)i
Past Observational	-suŋ
Mirative	-nɔk
Volitional	-ĩ
Augmentative	-(s)a
Participle	-CṼ(C),-n
Durative	-i
Dictative	-si
Ablative	-ne
Locative	-la

The infinitive also marks the verb of a relative clause and a general action with no specific subject.

ɲɛ pèt̪-u čʰū t̪í t̪èŋa nɔ́k
1SG.GEN spill.PRF-INF water DEF cold MIR
The water that I spilled is cold

The ablative marking denotes successive actions with some causal relationship.

t̪í-ci dzím-ne gal
3SG-GEN catch.PRF-ABL go.PRF.DSJT
He caught (it) and went

The locative marking denotes when the action in the main clause is done for the purpose of achieving the action in the locative clause.

d̪am-i sa-p-la sʌma tsò-suŋ
PROPER.FEM-GEN eat.IMPF-INF-LOC food cook.PRF.DSJT-POBS
Damu cooked food in order to eat

The copula(Imperfective hín, perfective hot̪u)is used for existence, location, identity, and adjectival predicates. The evidential particle wɛ́ occurs at the end of phrases to denote an action which the speaker witnessed. The negative particle má is used with perfective verbs.

=== Nouns ===
There are four case-like clitics in Sherpa: nominative, genitive, locative, and ablative. These can also be used to mark arguments of a verb. There is a split-ergative system based on aspect; nominative-accusative in the imperfective and ergative-absolutive in the perfective.

=== Pronouns ===
Personal pronouns in Sherpa inflect for number and case. Third-person pronouns may be used as demonstratives, and the third person singular nominative also serves as the postnominal definite marker.

Person	Singular			Plural		
Person	Nominative	Genitive	Locative	Nominative	Genitive	Locative
1 (incl.)	--	--	--	d̪ʌkpu	d̪ʌkpi	d̪ʌkpula
1 (excl.)	ŋʌ	ɲɛ	ŋʌla	ɲirʌŋ	ɲire	ɲirʌŋla
2	cʰuruŋ	cʰore	cʰuruŋla	cʰírʌŋ	cʰíre	cʰírʌŋla
3	t̪í	t̪íki	t̪íla	t̪iwɔ́	t̪íwi	t̪iwɔ́la

There are two articles, which occur phrase-finally. The indefinite form is signaled with the enclitic -i at the end of a noun phrase.

=== Adjectives ===
The general word order within noun-phrases is Noun-Adjective. Quantifiers and numerals also follow the noun they modify. Numerals may take on the suffix -pa to denote ordinality or -kʌr to denote collectivity.

Sherpa numerals
Gloss					
one	čìk	༡ — གཅིག (chig)	eleven	čučik	༡༡ — བཅུ་གཅིག (Chyu chig)
two	ɲì	༢ — གཉིས (Nyi)	twelve	čìŋɲi	༡༢ — བཅུ་གཉིས (Chyung Nyi)
three	sùm	༣ — གསུམ (sum)	thirteen	čùpsum	༡༣ — བཅུ་གསུམ (Chyug sum)
four	ǰi	༤ — བཞི (shyi)	twenty	kʰʌlǰik	༢༠ — ཉིས་བཅུ (Nyishyu/Nyichyu)
five	ŋà	༥ — ལྔ (Nga)	twenty-one	kʰʌlǰik	༢༡ — ཉིས་བཅུ་གཅིག (Nyishyu chyu chig)
six	t̪úk	༦ — དྲུག (Tug)	thirty	kʰʌlsum	༣༠ — སུམ་བཅུ (Sum chyu)
seven	d̪in	༧ — བདུན (Duin)	fifty	kʰʌlŋa	༥༠ — ལྔ་བཅུ (Ngab chyu)
eight	jɛ́	༨ — བརྒྱད (gyad)	seventy	kʰʌld̪in	༧༠ — བདུན་བཅུ (Duin chyu)
nine	gu	༩ — དགུ (Gu)	ninety	kʰʌlgu	༩༠ — དགུ་བཅུ (Gub chyu)
ten	t͡ɕu˥	༡༠ — བཅུ (chu)	one hundred	kʰʌl čìt̪ʰʌmba	༡༠༠ — བརྒྱ (Gya)

== Sample text ==
The following is a sample text in Sherpa of Article 1 of the Universal Declaration of Human Rights:

Sherpa in Tibetan script

མི་རིགས་ཏེ་རི་རང་དབང་དང་རྩི་མཐོང་གི་ཐོབ་ཐང་འདྲ་འདྲའི་ཐོག་སྐྱེའུ་ཡིན། གང་ག་རྣམ་དཔྱོད་དང་ཤེས་རབ་ལྷན་སྐྱེས་སུ་འོད་དུབ་ཡིན་ཙང་། ཕར་ཚུར་གཅིག་གིས་གཅིག་ལ་སྤུན་གྱི་འདུ་ཤེས་འཇོག་དགོས་ཀྱི།

Sherpa in Devanagari script

मि रिग ते रि रङ्वाङ् दङ् चिथोङ गि थोप्थङ डडइ थोग् क्येउ यिन्। गङ् ग नम्ज्योद दङ् शेस्रब् ल्हन्क्ये सु ओद्दुब् यिन् चङ् । फर्छुर च्यिग्गि-च्यिग्ल पुन्ग्यि दुशेस् ज्योग्गोग्यि।

Sherpa in IAST transliteration

Mi rig te ri raṅvāṅ daṅ cithoṅ gi thopthaṅ ḍaḍaï thog kyeu yin. Gaṅ ga namjyod daṅ śesrab lhankye su oddub yin caṅ, pharchur cyiggi-cyigla pungyi duśes jyoggogyi.

Sherpa in the Wylie transliteration

Mi rigs te ri rang dbang dang rtsi thong gi thob thang 'dra 'dra'i thog skyeu yin. Gang ga rnam dpyod dang shes rab lhan skyes su 'od dub yin tsang, phar tshur gcig gis gcig la spun gyi 'du shes 'jog dgos kyi.

Translation

Article 1: All human beings are born free and equal in dignity and rights. They are endowed with reason and conscience and should act towards one another in a spirit of brotherhood.
