= Yolmo =

Yolmo or Hyolmo may refer to:

- Yolmo people, an indigenous group of Nepal
- Yolmo language, the Sino-Tibetan language spoken by them
