= Sermathang =

Village in northeastern Nepal

Sermathang is a village in northeastern Nepal situated at an altitude of 2500 meters (approximately) from sea level. It lies southeast of the Helambu Village Council in Sindhupalchowk District.

== Demographics ==
Inhabitants of Sermathang are Yolmo people and speak the Yolmo language.

== Economy ==
People in Shermathang are mostly employed in tourism and agriculture. Some families work as seasonal migrant labourers.

== Transport ==
Being specific to a locality, Shermathang, a village of Helambu, is in the northernmost part of the rural municipality surrounded by Chhimi, Thangpaldhap, Bhotang, Chitre, Kakane, Kieul, and other villages of the district. Shermahtnag is on the lap of the mountain just below the forest area of Langtang National Park (LNP). It is accessible by graveled roads from the main bazaar Melamchi and the capital city Kathmandu these days and has frequent bus service on winter days.

== Climate ==
Climate data for Sermathang, elevation 2,625 m (8,612 ft)
Month	Jan	Feb	Mar	Apr	May	Jun	Jul	Aug	Sep	Oct	Nov	Dec	Year
Mean daily maximum °C (°F)	10.1 (50.2)	11.7 (53.1)	16.2 (61.2)	18.6 (65.5)	19.3 (66.7)	18.8 (65.8)	18.8 (65.8)	19.1 (66.4)	18.1 (64.6)	17.6 (63.7)	13.7 (56.7)	11.0 (51.8)	16.1 (61.0)
Mean daily minimum °C (°F)	−1.9 (28.6)	−0.6 (30.9)	3.1 (37.6)	5.9 (42.6)	8.4 (47.1)	11.1 (52.0)	12.0 (53.6)	11.3 (52.3)	10.5 (50.9)	6.9 (44.4)	1.9 (35.4)	−0.9 (30.4)	5.6 (42.1)
Average precipitation mm (inches)	24.8 (0.98)	30.0 (1.18)	47.8 (1.88)	75.2 (2.96)	168.3 (6.63)	560.8 (22.08)	1,039.5 (40.93)	967.0 (38.07)	523.3 (20.60)	115.6 (4.55)	17.4 (0.69)	10.6 (0.42)	3,580.3 (140.97)
Source 1: Australian National University
Source 2: Japan International Cooperation Agency (precipitation)
