= Chongur =

Village in Gandaki Province, Nepal

Chongur (चोङगुर्), or Chhyokhar, is a small village near Barhagaun Muktichhetra, Muktinath in Mustang District, Gandaki Pradesh, Nepal and has an elevation of 3,700 metres. It is in the Muktinath valley. The population of 200 are Buddhist and speak the Mustang language. The Muktinath valley has seven historic villages: Ranipauwa, Putak, Jhong or Dzong, Chhyokhar or Chongur, Purang, Jharkot and Khinga.

The Chongur grasslands provide habitat for the snow leopards.
