= Mugali language =

Mugali may be:

- Lambichhong language (Kiranti, Ethnologue 17)
- Mugom dialect (Tibetan, Ethnologue 12)
