= Gyirong =

Gyirong (Wyl. skyid grong) is a Tibetan place name also transliterated Kyirong or Gyrong. To Lhasa Newar trans-Himalayan traders it was Kerung (Nepali: केरुङ), thence Kirong, Kirang etc.

It may refer to:

- Gyirong County, county in Tibet near the border of Nepal
- Gyirong Town, a town in Tibet near the border of Nepal
- Gyirong Port, border crossing and port of entry on the China–Nepal border
- Gyirong Tsangpo, name of the upper reaches of the Trishuli River in Tibet
- Kyirong language, a Tibetic language
- Zongga, the seat of Gyirong county, sometimes called Gyirong Town
