= Mugali =

Tibetan Buddhist tribe in Nepal

The Mugali are a remote Tibetan Buddhist tribe in the Mugu District of Nepal who speak the Mugom dialect of the Mugom–Karmarong language. There have been attempts to create public health materials for them that take into account their culture.

== Sources ==
- short page on health initiative with the Mugali
