= Yolmo language =

Sino-Tibetan language of Nepal

Yolmo
- Helambu Sherpa
- Yolmo
- Native to: Nepal
- Ethnicity: Yolmo
- Native speakers: 10,000 (2011 census)
- Language family: Sino-Tibetan: Tibeto-Kanauri ?; Bodish; Tibetic; Kyirong-Kagate; Yolmo
- Dialects: Eastern Yolmo (Sermathang, Chhimi); Western Yolmo (Nuwakot District); Lamjung Yolmo; Ilam Yolmo

Language codes
- ISO 639-3: scp
- Glottolog: hela1238
- ELP: Helambu Sherpa
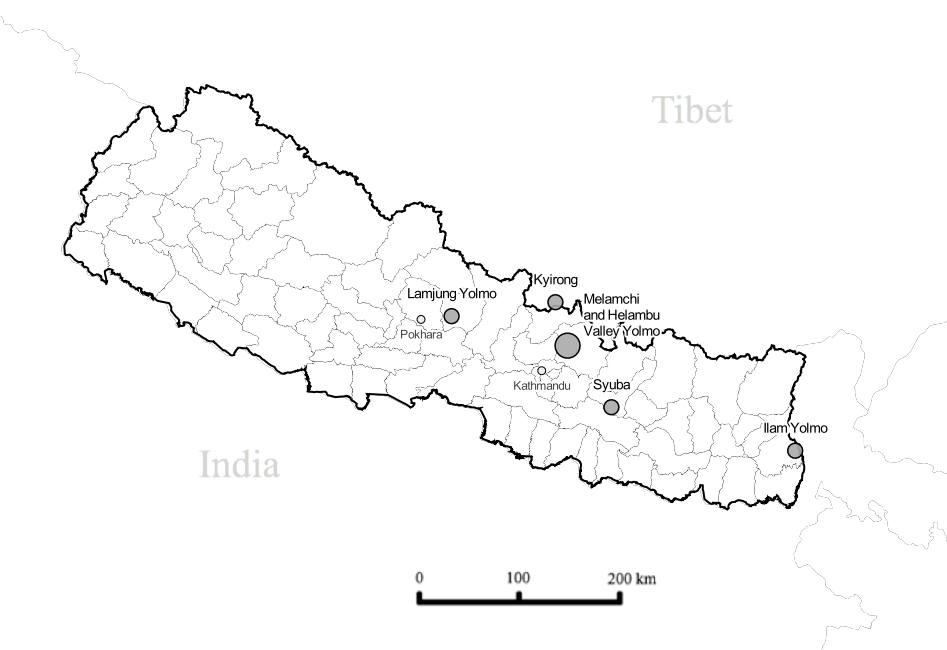

Yolmo (Hyolmo, Yohlmo) is a Tibetic language of the Yolmo people or yolmowa of Nepal (ISO 639-3: scp, GlottoCode: yolm1234). Yolmo is spoken predominantly in the Helambu and Melamchi valleys in northern Nuwakot District and northwestern Sindhupalchowk District. Dialects are also spoken by smaller populations in Lamjung District and Ilam District and also in Ramecchap District (where it is known as Syuba). It is very similar to Kyirong Tibetan and less similar to Standard Tibetan and Sherpa. There are approximately 10,000 Yolmo speakers, although some dialects have larger populations than others.

== Language name ==
Yolmo is both the name of the language (glottonym), and the ethnic group of people who speak the language (ethnonym). Yolmo is also written Hyolmo, Yholmo or Yohlmo. The 'h' in all of these spellings marks that the word has low tone. Sometimes the language is referred to as Yolmo ke or yolmo tam is the Yolmo word for 'language'.

== Language family ==
Yolmo is part of the family of languages called Kyirong-Kagate. The languages of this family are located along the Himalayan hills and mountains mostly on the Nepal side of the border, although Kyirong is in the Tibet Antonymous Region. Along with Yolmo, Kyirong and Syuba, other languages in the family include Tsum, Nubri and Gyalsumdo.

The language family is better considered be Kyirong-Yolmo. Yolmo has far more speakers (at least 10,000) than Kagate (Syuba) (1,500), Yolmo speakers are found in multiple districts, including Melamchi, Lamjung and Ilam, while Kagate speakers are based in Ramechhap. Also, Kagate is an exonym, and speakers now prefer the endonym Syuba, which carries less pejorative stigma than the caste-associated term Kagate ('papermaker').

This is part of a larger cluster of Tibetic languages, which all have their roots in the language that was the basis for Classical Tibetan.

== History ==
Yolmo speakers traditionally reside in the Helambu and Melamchi Valley regions in the Nuwakot and northern Sindhupalchowk districts of Nepal. Yolmo speakers migrated to the area, across the Himalaya, from the Kyriong, in what is now Southwest Tibet, over 300 years ago. This migration appears to have occurred slowly over multiple generations, rather than one large migration event. Main villages where Yolmo speakers reside include Melamchi Ghyang, Tarke Ghyang, Nakote, Kangyul, Sermathang, Norbugoun, Timbu, and Kutumsang.

Yolmo speakers are Buddhist, with the role of head Lama patrilineal. Yolmo Lamas are called upon to perform religious rituals for the Tamang-speaking communities that live in villages below the Yolmo-inhabited areas. This has created a strong socio-cultural link between the two groups that is reflected in traditional marriage practice where Tamang women marry into Yolmo villages. There is also a distinct local tradition of pòmbo (often referred to as 'shamanism' in the literature on this topic). The pòmbo tradition, passed from father to son, is focused on healing, particularly with regard to 'soul loss'. This practice appears to be evolving fit with the modern focus on Buddhism among Yolmo people. For example, pòmbo blood sacrifices are no longer performed as commonly.

Traditionally Yolmo people were yak herders and traders. They currently practice a combination of mixed agriculture involving livestock herding, hotel management, restaurants, and trading. Although outward migrants would often return to village life, speakers of Yolmo are increasing settling in Kathmandu, or moving overseas, which has an effect on transmission of the language as speakers move towards dominant languages of formal education such as Nepali and English.

For more on the history of Yolmo speakers, see the Yolmo people page.

== Dialects ==
There are a number of dialects of Yolmo, spread throughout Nepal, thanks to migration in recent centuries, including in Lamjung and Ilam. There are also closely related languages that should be considered when discussing Yolmo, including Kagate (Syuba) and Langtang. Some of these varieties have been documented in more detail than others. Some of the dialects also have more mutual intelligibility, which means it is easier for the speakers to understand each other. Below is a list of established dialects, including what is known about each.

=== Melamchi Valley Yolmo ===
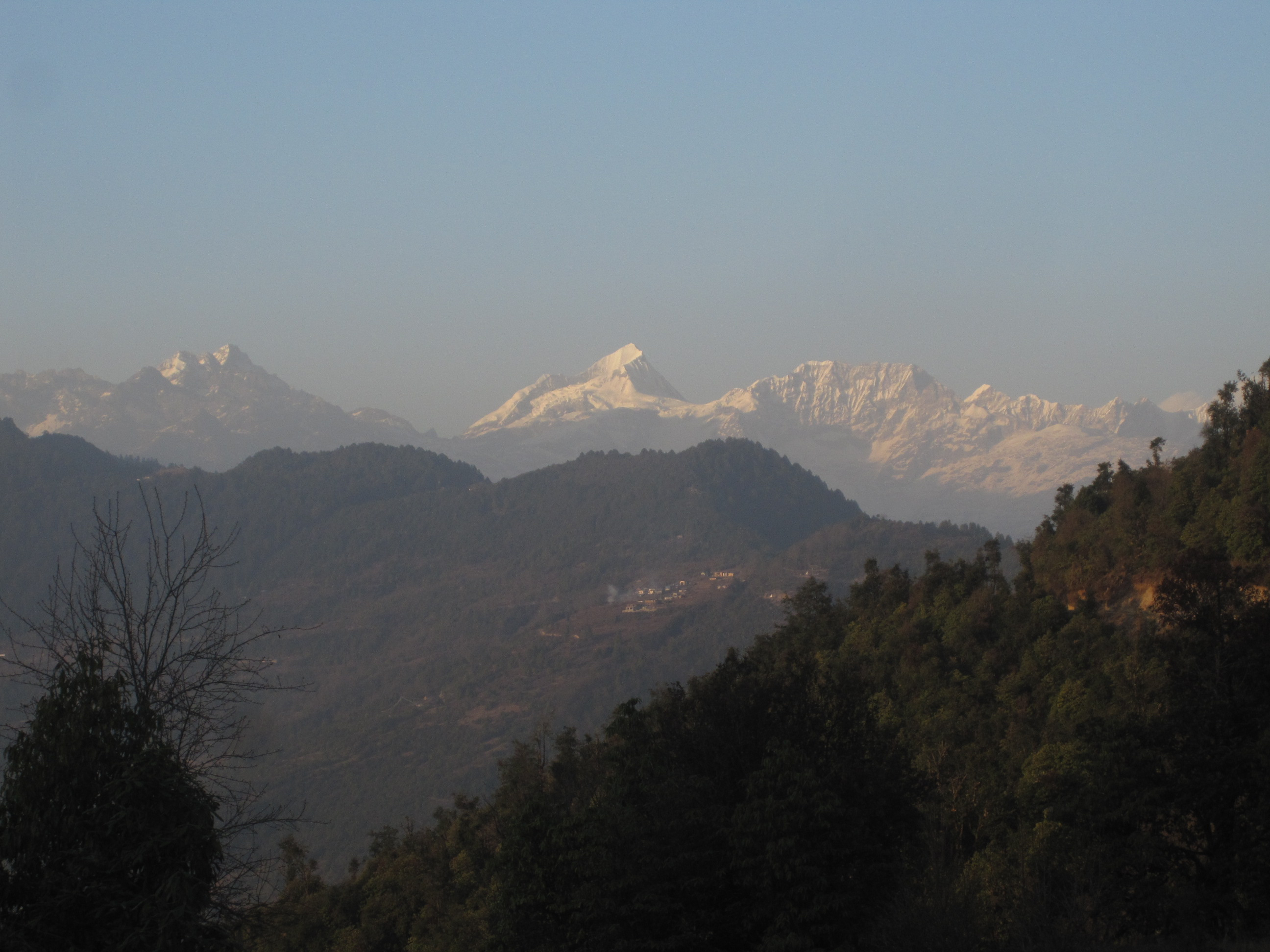
Sermathang Village, Melamchi Valley, Nepal

The variety of Yolmo documented by Anna Marie Hari is mostly spoken in the Melamchi Valley area. Hari documented the variety of Yolmo mostly spoken around the villages of Sermathang and Chhimi. Hari also encountered speakers from other areas in the Melamchi and Helambu valleys, and suggested there are two dialects across this area. mostly distinguished by vocabulary. The two dialects are the 'western' dialect, mostly in Nuwakot district and the 'eastern' dialect, which Hari's work focuses on. While discussing these dialects Hari also observes that the variety spoken around Tarkeghyang is different again, suggesting there may be more than two dialects spoken in the area.

Hari produced a Yolmo-Nepali-English dictionary of the language with Chhegu Lama, and a sketch grammar. Hari also translated the New Testament of the Bible into Yolmo. Original cassette recordings of her work have been digitised and archived with PARADISEC. Unless otherwise stated, all discussion of the grammar of Yolmo on this page is drawn from the work on Melamchi Valley Yolmo.

=== Langtang ===
Northwest of the Yolmo-speaking areas in the Langtang valley of the Rasuwa District are three villages that speak a language that is mutually intelligible with Yolmo. This language also shares features with Kyirong and is likely part of a dialect continuum between Yolmo and Kyirong.

=== Lamjung Yolmo ===
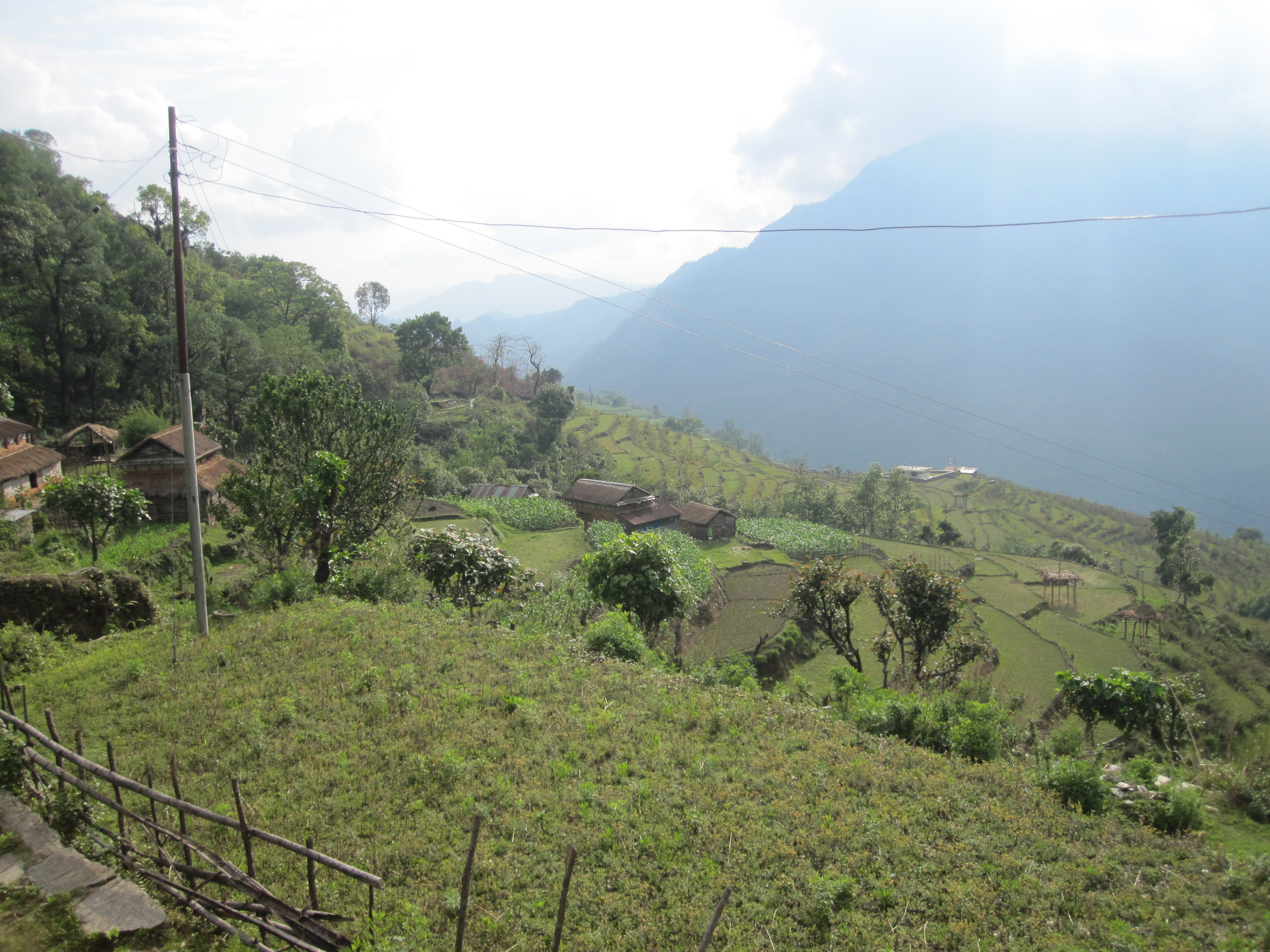
Nayagaun, Lamjung, Nepal

Gawne 2016

Lamjung Yolmo is spoken by around 700 people in five villages of the Lamjung District of Nepal. Yolmo speakers have been residing in this area for over a century. Gawne has written a sketch grammar and a Lamjung Yolmo-Nepali-English dictionary. There is also a digital archive of Lamjung Yolmo recordings archived with PARADISEC.

=== Ilam Yolmo ===
A dialect of Yolmo is reportedly spoken in the Ilam District of far east Nepal. There is very little documentation of this variety, but it is mutually intelligible with Syuba. Recordings from the dialect are available as a subset of an online collection of Syuba materials archived with PARADISEC.

=== Syuba (Kagate) ===
Although Syuba has a distinct name, and a separate ISO 639-3 code (SYW), linguistically it can be considered a dialect of Yolmo. Syuba speakers say their families migrated to the area more than a century ago. Hari, who worked on both Yolmo and Syuba observes that "to quite a large extent they are mutually intelligible dialects". The lexical similarity between Syuba and Melamchi Valley Yolmo is at least 79%, with the similarity between Syuba and Lamjung Yolmo even higher (88%). There is a higher level of similarity between Yolmo and Syuba than there is between either of these languages and Kyirong. This all suggests that the separated dialects may have more in common with each other than with the main dialect area. In 2016 the Syuba community published a Syuba-Nepali-English dictionary.

Three open access collections of Syuba, MH1 digitised from Monika Hölig's 1970s recordings, SUY1 documentation by Lauren Gawne (2009-2016), MTC1 a 2013 BOLD documentation by the Mother Tongue Centre Nepal.

== Language vitality ==
Using the Expanded Graded Intergenerational Disruption Scale (EGIDS), Ethnologue gives Yolmo a vitality rating of 6a 'Vigorous', but does not cite a source for this claim. The vitality of the language varies depending on the location. In the Melamchi Valley area the language is spoken mostly by older adults. The younger generations having largely shifted to Nepali, though the language is being maintained for religious practices. The shift towards Nepali for younger speakers has also been observed in Lamjung, as this is the language used in schools. The Syuba variety in Ramechhap is currently still spoken across all generations, including children. Mitchell & Eichentopf give it an EGIDS rating of 6a 'Vigorous', which is the likely reference for the Ethnologue rating. This is a recent survey with primary data presented, and is in concord with the first author's own observations of this community. There is insufficient data on the Ilam or Langtang variety to assess their vitality at this stage.

== Language contact ==
The majority of Yolmo speakers are minimally bilingual in the national language Nepali. For older speakers Nepali was mostly used for interaction with people outside their community, and they may be less proficient, while younger speakers are likely to have attended school in Nepali and are proficient.

While there is relatively little influence of Nepali on basic vocabulary (such as the Swadesh list below), Nepali words are commonly adopted into Yolmo. In Hari & Lama's dictionary of over 4000 entries there are over 200 entries marked with some kind of Nepali influence. The extent to which Nepali words have been reconfigured to Yolmo phonology has not been systematically studied. One observation is that Nepali verbs take a suffix -ti before any tense or aspect marking. This suffix is not voiced in any environment, unlike the perfective aspect marker -ti.

In the Helambu area Tamang women would marry into the villages, but they appeared to move to Yolmo-speaking when they married in (although contact with Tamang may account for some features of Yolmo, such as the general fact evidential, below).

Individuals may also have other languages in their personal repertoire, through marriage to someone from a different language group, international work or engagement with tourists from different countries. English is increasingly common as a language of education.

== Orthography ==
Yolmo does not have a written tradition although there are attempts to develop an orthography based on Devanagari, the script used to write the national language Nepali, as seen in the publication of two dictionaries. Syuba speakers also settled on a Devanagari orthography for their dictionary. All of these dictionaries also present the languages in Roman orthographies.

=== Devanagari ===
The modifications to Devanagari are minor, and are intended to ensure that all sounds in the language can be represented. None of the orthographies use the 'inherent schwa vowel', meaning that a consonant without an overt vowel is not treated as having an implied vowel. Consonants remain the same as in the existing Devanagari tradition, with the use of joined digraphs to represent additional sounds in the language, such as the combination of क (k) and य (y) for the palatal stop क्य ([c] 'kh'), स (s) and य (y) for the palatal fricative स्य ([ʃ] 'sh'), र and ह for the voiceless liquid र्ह ([r̥] 'rh'), and ल and ह for the voiceless lateral ल्ह ([l̥] 'lh') ह्य ('hy').

Vowel length is unmarked in the Syuba dictionary, in the two Yolmo dictionaries the standard Devanagari length distinctions are made, with the addition of a small diacritic below the 'a' vowel ( ा) to indicate a longer vowel. The Hari & Lama and Gawne dictionaries both use ह (h) after the vowel to mark low tone (e.g. टाह ʈà 'pheasant'), while in (the Syuba orthography a visarga represents the low tone (टाः ʈà 'pheasant'). High tone is left unmarked.

=== Roman ===
All three dictionaries also make use of variations on a Romanised orthography, although this does not appear to be used or preferred by Yolmo speakers, and is intended for the English-literate audience of the dictionaries. Consonants predominantly take their form from the International Phonetic Alphabet, with some exception where there is a more common preference in English, such as digraphs for the palatal stops ([c] 'ky', [c^{h}] 'khy', [ɟ] 'gy') and non-superscript for aspiration (e.g. phá 'pig'). This is represented in the consonant chart in the Phonology section.

The vowels in Yolmo follow the International Phonetic Alphabet, except for [ɔ] which uses 'o' for ease of typing. Long vowels are represented by double characters, e.g. [ɲíː] 'two' is represented as ɲíi, except in the Syuba dictionary where vowel length is not indicated in either the Devanagari or Roman scripts. For tone Hari uses a 'h' after the vowel to represent low tone, (e.g. toh 'stone') with high tone unmarked (e.g. to 'rice'), Gawne uses the International Phonetic Alphabet convention of using accents over the vowel to mark high and low tone (e.g. tó 'rice' and tò 'stone'), while the Syuba dictionary uses a superscript ^{L} at the start of the syllable to mark low tone (e.g. ^{L}to 'stone') with high tone unmarked.

On this page the orthography mostly follows Hari's transcription, as outlined in the phonology. Unlike Hari, representation of tone follows the International Phonetic Alphabet, with accents to mark high and low tone (e.g. tó 'rice' and tò 'stone' respectively). This avoids Hari's use of 'h' to represent both low tone and the sound [h].

== Grammatical overview ==
The sections below contain an overview of the key features of the grammar of Yolmo. Information is mostly drawn from Hari's grammar of the language, supplemented by the Yohlmo-Nepali-English dictionary she co-wrote with Chhegu Lama. Differences between this variety and other documented dialects are indicated where relevant. Links to other related languages will also be made where relevant.

All example sentences are presented with an interlinear gloss. This breaks down the words on a morpheme level, giving information about the meaning of each morpheme using a standard set of glossing abbreviations. All examples are cited back to the original publication they are drawn from. Some glossing has been regularised, or added where it was not included in the original.

== Phonology ==
=== Consonants ===
There are 36 consonants in Yolmo, which are summarized in the table below. The form is given in IPA and then to the right in brackets is given the form used in this article, if different.

		Labial	Dental	Post- alveolar	Retroflex	Palatal	Velar	Glottal
Plosive	voiceless	p	t		ʈ	c ⟨ky⟩	k	
Plosive	aspirated	pʰ ⟨ph⟩	tʰ ⟨th⟩		ʈʰ ⟨ʈh⟩	cʰ ⟨khy⟩	kʰ ⟨kh⟩	
Plosive	voiced	b	d		ɖ	ɟ ⟨gy⟩	ɡ	
Fricative	voiceless		s	ɕ				h
Fricative	voiced		z	ʑ				
Affricate	voiceless		ts	tɕ				
Affricate	aspirated		tsʰ ⟨tsh⟩	tɕʰ ⟨tɕh⟩				
Affricate	voiced		dz	dʑ				
Nasal		m	n			ɲ	ŋ	
Rhotic	voiceless		r̥ ⟨rh⟩					
Rhotic	voiced		r					
Lateral	voiceless		l̥ ⟨lh⟩					
Lateral	voiced		l					
Semivowel		w				j ⟨y⟩		

Not all consonants are equally frequent. In particular [h], [r̥] and [l̥] are not particularly frequent, nor are vowel-initial words.

=== Vowels ===
There are five places of articulation for vowels. There is a length distinction at each place of articulation. The form of each vowel is given in IPA and then to the right in brackets is given the form used in this article, if different.

	Front	Mid	Back
High	i iː ⟨ii⟩		u uː ⟨uu⟩
Mid	e eː ⟨ee⟩		ɔ ⟨o⟩ ɔː ⟨oo⟩
Low		a aː ⟨aa⟩	

Below are some minimal pairs that demonstrate the vowel length distinction. The diacritic above the vowel is the tone marker, the acute accent indicates that all of these examples are high tone. This is explained in more detail in the section on tone.

tɕí	'one'
tɕíi	'what'
tó	‘rice (cooked)'
tóo	'be hungry'

Vowel-length distinctions are not common across Tibetic language, but they are also attested in Syuba (although Syuba speakers do not consider them salient enough to encode in the orthography) and in Kyirong for open syllables.

Unlike many other Tibetic languages, including Kyirong, and Standard Tibetan, Yolmo does not have a front rounded [y]. This is true for all dialects of Yolmo documented to date, including Syuba. Langtang, however, does have this vowel.

=== Tone ===
Like other Tibetic languages, Yolmo has tone, which is located on the first vowel of a word. Hari presents a four tone contrast of Melamchi Valley Yolmo; high level, high falling, low level and low falling. Acoustic evidence from Lamjung Yolmo and Kagate indicates that there is only acoustic evidence for a contrast between two tones; low and high. Below are some examples of tone minimal pairs:

pú	'body hair'
pù	‘son’
kómba	‘thirsty’
kòmba	‘temple’

Low tone words can be marked with breathy voice, but this is not always the case. The practice of indicating low tone with a 'h' following the vowel in some orthographies is related to this breathy property of low-tone vowels. The high tone, which uses modal voice, is left unmarked.

Tone is predictable in some environments. It is always high following aspirated stops, aspirated affricates and voiceless liquids (which speakers treat as equivalent to aspirated). Examples of all of these include:

pháa	'pig'
thí	'ruler (for measuring)'
ʈháa	'blood'
khyá	'you, plural'
khá	'mouth'
tshá	'salt'
tɕhá	'pair'
rhílmu	'round'
lhá	'god'

Tone is always low following voiced stops, voiced fricatives and voiced affricates. Examples of all of these include:

bù	'insect'
dà	'arrow'
ɖù	'grain'
gyàa	'place'
gùri	'cat'
dzàdi	'nutmeg'
dʑùbu	'huge/much'
zà	'rainbow'
ʑèe	'udder'

On words with more than one syllable the tone is marked on the initial syllable. Subsequent syllables eventually level off. Tone on all words is influenced by prosody, and may become more or less neutralised in running speech.

The only prefixes in the language are the negator prefixes mà- and mè-. Both have low tone, however if the following root has high tone it will not change tone because of the preceding low suffix.

There are no morpho-phonemic variations discussed for the language. The only related feature are a small set of verb minimal pairs where transitivity is distinguished by tone:

làŋ	'to rise'
láŋ	'to raise'
tàp	'to fall'
táp	'to be scattered'
ròp	'to break'
róp	'to break something'

=== Syllable structure ===
Yolmo has the syllable structure (C)(C)V(C). This means that the minimum a syllable needs is a vowel. Syllables can also have up to two consonants before the vowel and one after the vowel.

V	òo	'there'
VC	ùr	'fly'
CV	pù	'son'
CVC	pùp	'keep warm'
CCV	prù	'write'
CCVC	prùl	'snake'

All consonants and vowels can occur word-initial, with a restricted set able to occur in the second syllable. The set of syllable initial consonant clusters includes /pr, br, kr, py, phy, sw, kw, thw, rw/.

All vowels can occur syllable-final, and final consonants include voiceless unaspirated bilabial /b/ and velar stops /k/, voiced liquids /l,r/, the voiced labio-velar /w/ and all nasals except the palatal /m, n, ng/.

=== Morphophonemic processes ===
There is a regular process by which the suffixes undergo a change depending on the nature of the verb that they are attached to. Suffixes that begin with a voiceless stop, such as the non-past -ke, the imperative -toŋ or the hortative -ka, all undergo regular morphophonological processes. If they occur after a syllable with a final sound that is voiced they will also be voiced, if they occur after an unvoiced final sound, or an /r/ the start of the suffix will be unvoiced. The examples below are with the non-past -ke:

tá-ge	watch-non.pst
tén-ge	show-non.pst
zàp-ke	dress.up-non.pst
mùr-ke	chew-non.pst

The only forms that cannot be predicted by this process is if the suffix is after /i/ or /e/, both of which are high front vowels. The voicing cannot be predicted in this context, and the suffix is sometimes voiced and sometimes unvoiced. Below are examples of verbs with both /i/ and /e/:

pí-ge	pull.out-non.pst
ɕí-ge	die-non.pst
ɕé-ke	tell-non.pst
kyé-ke	give.birth-non.pst

There is also a tendency for suffixes that begin with -k/ -g to omit the initial sound after a vowel. This is not as regular a process as the voicing alterations described above. Below are some examples of this process:

ŋà=i 1=SG=GEN 'my'	ɖò-en go-NPST 'go'

Tappu LAMA

== Nouns/nominals ==
The noun phrase in Yolmo includes either a noun or a pronoun. The noun phrase with a noun can also include a determiner, adjective and number marker, while the options are more limited with a pronoun or proper noun. Noun suffixes include case markers, plural marker and numeral classifiers.

The order of the noun phrase is (Determiner) Noun=Plural(-Focus Marker)(=Case) (Numeral Classifier) (Number) (Adjective).

=== Determiners ===
The Yolmo definite determiner is dì the same as the third person inanimate pronoun 'it/this'. It occurs before the noun:

dì pèza
DET child
'The child' (Hari 2010: 31)

The indefinite is marked using the numeral tɕíi 'one', which comes after the noun, like other numbers:

mì tɕíi
person one
'A person' (Hari 2010: 91)

=== Pronouns ===
Yolmo pronouns are presented in the table below. There is an inclusive/exclusive distinction for first person plural pronouns, a gender distinction for third person singular and an animacy distinction for third person.

		Singular	Plural
1st person	exclusive	ŋà	ɲì
1st person	inclusive	ŋà	òraŋ/ùu
2nd person		khyé	khyá
3rd Person	masc.	khó	khúŋ
3rd Person	fem.	mò	khúŋ
3rd Person	inanimate	dì	dìya
Reflexive		ràŋ	

The first person plural òraŋ is more commonly found in the Western dialects of Melamchi and Helambu Valley Yolmo, as well as Lamjung Yolmo, while ùu is more common in the Eastern dialects. It is possible to create a dual form by adding ɲíi to the plural form (e.g. khyá ɲíi 'you two'), although this is optional.

The third person plural khúŋ can also be used as a polite form for a single third person.

Pronouns do not take determiners, number, or adjectives.

==== Interrogative pronouns ====
Interrogative pronouns are used to form questions. Yolmo has the following attested interrogative pronouns:

sú	'who'
nàm	'when'
kàla	'where'
tɕípe, tɕíle, tɕí mée	'why'
tɕí	'what'
kàndi	'which one'
súgi	'whose'
súla	'whom'
kànɖu, kànmu	'how'

Hari gives both kà and kàla (kà with the dative suffix) as forms for 'where' in Melamchi Valley Yolmo, but only kàla is attested in Lamjung Yolmo. There are also a number of forms for 'why', tɕípe and tɕíle are attested in both Melamchi Valley Yolmo and Lamjung Yolmo, but only tɕí mée in Melamchi Valley Yolmo. This is because it uses the verb mée 'say' as part of the construction, which is not in Lamjung Yolmo (see the section on reported speech, as well as the word list). The kànmu form of 'how' is attested in Lamjung Yolmo, while kànɖu is used in Melamchi Valley Yolmo, with an optional -mu suffix to make kànɖu-mu. Hari and Lama also note the form kànɖu-bar in the Western regions.

Note that the words súgi and súla are complex forms, súgi is sú 'who' with the genitive case suffix, and súla is sú with the dative case suffix.

For more on the structure of interrogative clauses, see the section on question formation.

=== Proper nouns ===
Proper nouns include people's names, place names and the names of deities. They do not take determiners, number, or adjectives.

=== Plural ===
The plural marker in Melamchi and Lamjung Yolmo is =ya. The plural is treated as a clitic as it occurs after an adjective if there is one, rather than always attaching directly to the noun:

kháŋba tɕímbu tɕhímbu=ya
house big big=PL
'The big houses' (Hari 2010: 28)

Plural marking is optional if an overt number is used with the noun, or if the number is clear from context:

pèmpiʑa súm dù
women three COP.PE
'There are three women' (Gawne 2016: 55)

The plural form in Syuba is =kya, which is more similar to the Kyirong form, suggesting the Yolmo =ya is an innovation.

=== Focus marker ===
Yolmo has a nominal focus marker -ti. The focus marker gives prominence to the noun it is attached to. In the example below, the older brother is singled out, contrasted with other relatives who perhaps did not obtain such wealth:

áda-di ɲìma ɲèdzen tɕhúkpu kàl-di oŋ-sin dù
older.brother-FOC day every rich went-PFV come-PST AUX.PE
'The older brother became richer every day.' (Hari & Lama 2004: 271)

Hari also notes for Melamchi Valley Yolmo that there is a focus marker -ka, which is used specifically to mark something as contrary to expectation.

kháŋba tɕhímbu tɕhímbu=ya-la-ga tè-ku dù
house big big=PL-LOC-FOC reside-IPFV AUX.PE
'I realize that they are living in big houses.' (Hari 2010: 27)

Nouns can also take the emphatic suffixes -ni and -raŋ, which are also used for other parts of speech (see section on lexical emphasis).

=== Case marking ===
Yolmo uses post-positional suffixes to mark the case of nouns. Similar to other Tibetic languages, Yolmo uses a single case form for multiple functions. Case marking is treated as a clitic, as clitics come at the end of the whole noun phrase, rather than directly attaching to only the noun. Below the cases are listed with their functions.

Case marker	Function
=ki	genitive, ergative, instrumental
=la	locative, allative, dative
=le(gi)	ablative

The case markers are phonologically bound, with the =ki form becoming voiced in some environments, it is also reduced to =i in some environments. See the section on morphophonemic processes for more on this.

Where there is also a plural the case marker comes after the plural, as in the example below:

tɕàmu=ya=gi kòŋa tɕú thál kyée dù
hen=PL=ERG egg ten NUM.CLF lay COP.PE
'The hens laid ten eggs' (Hari 2010: 23)

==== Ergative case ====
Yolmo has optional ergative case-marking. Ergative marking means that subjects of intransitive verbs are unmarked, the same as objects of transitive verbs. Subjects of transitive verbs are distinguished from both of these with the =ki marker (in contrast to nominative-accusative languages like English, where the subjects of both intransitive and transitive verbs are marked in contrast with objects of transitive verbs).

Below is an intransitive sentence, with the subject ŋà taking no marking:

ŋà ŋù-sin
1SG cry-PST
'I cried'

In contrast with this ergative-marked transitive, where the subject ŋà is marked with the ergative:

ŋà=gi ɕò úp-sin
1SG=ERG yoghurt cover-PST
'I covered the yoghurt' (Hari 2010: 39)

Speakers do not always use the ergative case, which is why it is considered 'optional':

ŋà tó sà-ke
1SG rice.cooked eat-NPST
'I eat rice' (Gawne 2016: 69)

Ergative marking is more common for past tense, and non-habitual actions. There also appears to be some effect of animacy, and the ergative appears to be used as a strategy in discourse to mark agentivity. This form of optional ergativity is common across the Tibeto-Burman family.

==== Dative case ====
Dative case is typically used to indicate, broadly, the noun to which something is given. The Yolmo dative has this function, but it also has a function in 'dative subject' constructions. The dative subject occurs with a small set of intransitive verbs, and denote personal, and usually internal, states.

ŋà=la hé kà-en
1SG=DAT potatoes like-NPST
'I like potatoes.' (Hari 2010: 42)

The use of dative subjects is common in languages of this area, and is also attested more broadly.

=== Number ===
Yolmo has a base-20 counting system. As can be seen in the examples above, cardinal numbers can be used in noun phrases.

The Yolmo number system is very similar to that of Standard Tibetan and other Tibetan varieties. In the table below is the Yolmo number, taken from Hari's dictionary.

Yolmo	English	Yolmo	English	Yolmo	English
tɕíi	1	khál tɕíi tɕíi	21	ʑìpkha	400
ɲíi	2	khál tɕíi ɲíi	22	ŋápkya	500
súm	3	khál tɕíi súm	23	ʈùpkya	600
ʑì	4	khál tɕíi ʑì	24	tìngya	700
ŋá	5	khál tɕíi ŋá	25	kyèkya	800
ʈùu	6	khál tɕíi ʈúu	26	kùpkya	900
tìn	7	kál tɕíi tìn	27	tóŋra	1000
kyèe	8	khál tɕíi kyèe	28		
kù	9	khál tɕíi kù	29		
tɕú	10	khál tɕíi tɕú	30		
tɕúuʑi	11	khál ɲíi	40		
tɕíŋii	12	khál tɕú	50		
tɕúusum	13	khál súm	60		
tɕúpɕi	14	khál súm tɕú	70		
tɕéeŋa	15	khál ʑì	80		
tɕíiru	16	khál ʑì tɕú	90		
tɕúptin	17	khál ŋá	100		
tɕápkye	18	khál tìn tɕú	150		
tɕúrku	19	khál tɕú	200		
khál ɕíi	20	khál tɕéeŋa	300		

In Lamjung Yolmo, the base-20 system is only used by a small number of older speakers, with others using a base-10 system. For example, 'twenty' is ɲídʑu, 'thirty' is súmdʑu, 'forty' is ɕíptɕu, etc. Even then, once people reach 20 the usually switch to counting in Nepali.

Ordinal numbers are formed by addition of the suffix -pa, or alternatively with the suffix -pu for ordinals relating to people, in Melamchi Yolmo. Ordinals are typically only formed up to 20.

==== Numeral classifiers ====
Yolmo also has an optional numeral classifier thál. This is used to emphasise number. In the example in the section on case marking above, the speaker is emphasising that the hens laid a large number of eggs.

Lamjung Yolmo also has the classifier mènda which can only be used with humans.

=== Adjectives ===
Adjectives occur within the noun phrase. Adjectives usually come after the noun so 'small child' would be pìʑa tɕháme (lit. 'child small'). Adjectives can also occur before the noun, especially in casual speech. Many adjectives are derived from verb forms, and often end with -pu, -po, -pa or -mu, but they do not act as verbs, as we see in languages like Magar and Manage. Hari also notes that there are some adjectives that appear to not have a known verbal origin. Adjectives can occur as the head of a noun phrase, but this is very uncommon.

tɕhómbo	'big'
rìŋbu	'long'
màrmu, màrpu	'red'
kárpu, kármu	'white'
dzìba	'afraid'
ʈòmbo	'warm'

It is possible to create a new adjective from a verb, using the -pa nominalising suffix. The verb stem is often reduplicated; rùl- 'to rot' becomes rùl rùlba 'rotten' and pàŋ- 'to be wet' becomes pàŋ pàŋba 'wet'.

== Verbs ==
There are three main types of verbs in Yolmo, lexical verbs, auxiliary verbs and copula verbs. The lexical verbs inflect for tense, aspect, mood and evidence and can take negation. The infinitive form of verbs takes the suffix -tɕe. The infinitive is used in a number of constructions, including the habitual and complementation.

=== Copula verbs ===
The copula verbs and their functions are given in the table below. Copulas are not inflected for person, number or politeness level and many do not distinguish tense:

	Egophoric	Dubitative	Perceptual	General Fact
Equation	yìn/yìngen/yìmba	yìnɖo	dù dùba	
Existential	yè/yèba yèken/yèba (past tense)	yèʈo	dù dùba	òŋgen/òŋge

Equation copulas are used to link two noun phrases, while existential copulas are used for functions of existence, location, attribution and possession. Hari describes the forms that end in -pa (voiced in this environment so they become -ba) as more emphatic, unlike lexical verbs with a -pa suffix they do not indicate past tense, and are not used exclusively in question structures.

Some copula verbs can also be used as verbal auxiliaries, particularly in constructions marked for aspect, where they contribute evidential, tense or epistemic information. The negative forms of each copula are given in the section on negation.

Below the different evidential and epistemic functions of each copula type are discussed.

==== Egophoric ====
The egophoric, or personal, is used to indicate that the speaker has personal knowledge about the information. In the example below, the speaker would not be reading the name of the book, but already know the name as they show it to someone else:

òo tɕhée=gi mìn gyàldzen tsému púŋgyen má-ẽ yìmba
that book=GEN name gyaldzen tsemu puŋgyen say-NPST COP.EGO
'This book is called 'Gyaldzen Tsemu Punggyen.' (Hari 2010: 66)

Unlike in Standard Tibetan, the speaker does not need to be personally close to an individual to use the egophoric while talking about them.

Different varieties of Yolmo prefer different forms of the egophoric as the default; In Helambu they prefer yìn, in Lamjung yìmba and Ilam yìŋge. yèken is past tense forms of the existential (yèke in Lamjung), with the form yèba also often used in past tense structures, as well as questions. The past form cannot be further decomposed, as the form -ken/-ke is the non-past tense suffix for lexical verbs.

There are some structures where the egophoric is used as the default, such as conditionals.

==== Dubitative ====
Unlike the other copulas, which mark evidential distinctions, the dubitative copulas are epistemic forms used for reduced certainty. They are related to the -ʈo dubitative suffixes for lexical verbs. In the example below, the speaker does not have any direct evidence that Rijan is in the house, but thinks that is where he might be:

rídʑan khím=la yèʈo
Rijan house=DAT COP.DUB
'Rijan is probably in the house.' (Gawne 2016: 88)

==== Perceptual ====
The perceptual, or sensory, evidential is used to mark information acquired through direct sensory evidence, either through sight, one of the other senses, or internal state (such as feeling an ache).

dèla ʈháa dù
here blood COP.PE
'I see there is some blood here.' (Hari 2010: 60)

Hari calls the perceptual forms mirative, as indicating knowledge through sense often occurs for information recently acquired. Only the dùba form, with the emphatic suffix -pa, appears to indicate some amount of surprise or counter-expectation.

==== General fact ====
The general fact form is used for uncontroversial and universally known facts. This verb is used in functions of existence, location, attribution and possession, and is not used in equational structures.

ɲì yùl=gi hé ɕìmbu òŋgen
2PL.EX village=GEN potato tasty COP.DUB
'The potatoes of our village are tasty.' (Hari 2010: 52)

The form is òŋgen in Melamchi Valley Yolmo and òŋge in Lamjung Yolmo, demonstrating a link with the non-past tense suffix. The verb itself is from the lexical verb òŋ- 'come'. It cannot be used for facts about the past. This copula is not attested in Standard Tibetan or any other Tibetic language outside of Yolmo.

=== Lexical verb stems ===
The Melamchi Valley variety of Yolmo exhibit verb stem alterations in the context of some verb structures.

Verb stems with short front vowels have their vowels lengthened (e.g. /i/→/ii/), short back vowels are fronted and lengthened (e.g. /o/ and /a/→/ee/, /u/→/i/). These changes occur mostly with perfective structures and imperatives. Below are some examples of this alternation using the verb má- 'say':

ŋà má-ke
1SG say-NPST
'I say' (Hari 2010: 35)

ŋà mée-di yè
1SG say-PFV AUX.EGO
'I have said' (Hari 2010: 35)

mée-doŋ
say-IMP
'say it!' (Hari 2010: 35)

When these structures are negated, the negative prefix is lengthened rather than the verb stem, which maintains the vowel change (this does not occur in the imperative).

ŋà màa-mé yè
1SG say-PFV AUX.EGO
'I have not said' (Hari 2010: 35)

These alterations do not occur in Lamjung Yolmo or Syuba.

=== Auxiliary verbs ===
There is a small set of auxiliary verbs in Yolmo. The auxiliary tè- is the same as the lexical verb tè- 'sit' and is used to add imperfective aspect:

mò sà tè-ku dù
she eat AUX-IPFV AUX.PE
'she is eating'

A subset of the copulas can also be used as verbal auxiliaries; yìn, yè, yèken and dù. These contribute evidential information and for yè/yèken also some tense information. As you can see in the example above the dù copula is being used as an auxiliary, so they can co-occur with the other auxiliaries.

=== Tense ===
Yolmo has a major tense distinction between past and non-past. These are marked with suffixes on the lexical verb, -sin is the past tense marker and -ke or -ken is the non-past marker.

==== Past tense ====
The past tense form is -sin.

ŋà=gi ɕò úp-sin.
1SG=ERG yoghurt cover-PST
'I covered up the yoghurt.' (Hari 2010: 23)

The past tense form -sin can also occur with the perceptual evidential dú in an auxiliary position. This is not possible with the non-past tense suffix, nor can any other copula be used as an auxiliary with the past tense suffix. Hari suggests this structure is inferential, in that the speaker did not have to witness the event, Gawne describes it as 'narrative past'.

tɕhú-kúla tshúr gyùr-sin dù
{water channel} this.side change-PST AUX.PE
'I see, the water channel has changed course to this side.' (Hari 2010: 45)

Melamchi Valley Yolmo also has a past tense form -kyo that Hari refers to as the 'main-point past/ telling past’, this form is not found in Lamjung Yolmo.

There is also the form -pa, which Hari says is always used in question structures. In Lamjung Yolmo there are some examples where it is used in declaratives rather than questions, with a past-tense meaning.

ŋà tɕhám-pa
1SG dance-PST
'I danced.' (Gawne 2016: 107)

==== Non-past tense ====
The non-past tense is used for both present and future constructions. Hari gives the forms -ke and -ken for Melamchi Valley Yolmo, but only -ke is attested in Lamjung Yolmo.

ŋà=la hé kà-en
1SG=DAT potatoes like-NPST
'I like potatoes.' (Hari 2010: 42)

Hari refers to this form as the 'intentional present' but it can also be used in future constructions:

dì kyée-di ɲì-ti pèza ɕi ɖò-en
this be.born-PERF 2PL-EMPH child four go-NPST
'After this one is born we will have four children.' (Hari 2010: 53)

=== Aspect ===
There are a number of verb suffixes that are used to mark aspect, these broadly fall into categories of imperfective and perfective, as well as habitual. When an aspect form is used, a copula verb is also used.

==== Imperfective ====
The imperfective is used for events that are ongoing or not complete. The -ku suffix is attested in both Melamchi Valley and Lamjung Yolmo. It can only be used with the dù copula verb.

tìriŋ {kháwa là} thóŋ-gu dù
today {snow mountains} be.seen-IPFV AUX.PE
'Today the snow mountains can be seen.' (Hari 2010: 43)

The imperfective form -teraŋ can be used with either the dù or yè copula verb. In Lumjung Yolmo some speakers pronounce it as -tiraŋ. Hari refers to the -teraŋ construction as the 'perfect continuous aspect', because it can be used to refer to something that was ongoing until a particular point, as per this first example:

tànda sámma-ni ɖìbu tér-teraŋ yè
now until-FOC money give-IPFV AUX.EGO
'Up to now he has been giving money.' (Hari & Lama 2004: 278)

Gawne describes it as an imperfective, as it does not appear to have this perfect aspect function in Lamjung Yolmo, as per this example:

mò kòlela tè-teraŋ dù
3SG.F slowly sit-IPFV AUX.PE
'She is slowly sitting down.' (Gawne 2016: 109)

The auxiliary verb tè can also be used to mark an imperfective construction. Neither -ku nor -teraŋ are used if the negative prefix is on the main verb. The auxiliary verb can be used in negative constructions, and takes the negative prefix, rather than the main verb. In the example below, the -teraŋ imperfective is used as the negative prefix is on the auxiliary:

ŋà lèn-diraŋ mà-tè yè
1SG sing-IPFV NEG.PST-AUX AUX.EGO
'I was not singing.' (Gawne 2016: 111)

==== Perfective ====
The perfective aspect suffix is used for events that can be described as whole, without reference to the duration like the imperfective. The perfective form in Yolmo is -ti.

mèŋgaŋ-la-ni thóola tɕhám tɕhímbu káp-ti yè
cooking.shed-LOC-FOC above board large cover-PFV AUX.EGO
'The cooking shed was covered with large boards.' (Hari & Lama 2004: 270)

Multiple verbs with perfective aspect can be used together to create a clause chaining structure. It is distinct from the nominal focus suffix -ti.

==== Habitual ====
Habitual aspect marks that an event is usual, customary or frequent. There is no specific habitual aspect suffix for Yolmo. Speakers will either use a verb with an infinitive, or with no suffix.

ŋà ɲìma ʈàŋmaraŋ khúra sà yè
1SG day every bread eat AUX.EGO
'I eat bread every day.' (Gawne 2016: 112)

=== Mood ===
Mood is marked in Yolmo with a set of verb suffixes. The main mood suffixes are given in the table below

Particle	Function
-toŋ	Imperative
-ka or -tɕo/tɕu	Hortative
-ɲi	Optative
-ʈo	Dubitative

==== Imperative ====
The polite imperative suffix is -toŋ (voiced as -doŋ after voiced codas and some vowels). An overt subject is not used, and the same imperative form is used regardless of person or number:

mée-doŋ!
speak-IMP
'Speak!' (Hari 2010: 46)

The less polite form of the imperative consists of an unmarked verb stem:

mée!
speak.IMP
'Speak!' (Hari 2010: 46)

There are also a small number of irregular imperatives that are formed without the imperative suffix, particularly sò 'eat!', from sà- 'eat'.

If there is an honorific form of the verb it can be used, unmarked, as the most polite form of the imperative:

ɕè
eat.HON
'Please eat' (Hari 2010: 113)

The negative form of the imperative (the prohibitive) uses the mà- form of the negator prefix with the verb stem. The imperative suffix is not included.

mà-má!
NEG-speak
'Don't speak!' (Hari 2010: 46)

==== Hortative ====
Gawne notes two verbal suffix forms for the hortative in Lamjung Yolmo, a -ka and a -tɕo.

The -ka form is used with all persons except first person singular.

òraŋ sà-ka
1PL.INCL eat-HORT
‘Let's eat!’ (Gawne 2016: 114)

The suffix remains in negated horatitves:

ɲì mà-tɕhám-ka
1PL.EXCL NEG-dance-HORT
‘Let's not dance!’ (Gawne 2016: 114)

The -tɕo form is used with first person singular, as well as with other persons. It also remains in negative constructions.

ŋà khím=ki lè pè-tɕo
1PL.EXCL house=GEN work do-HORT
‘Let me do the house work!’ (Gawne 2016: 114)

-tɕo appears to be less strong, and tends to be used more frequently. Hari gives the form as -tɕo (she also calls it an optative, but it appears to be a hortative)

tìriŋ khó dèla-raŋ tè-tɕo
today 3SG.M here-EMPH sit-HORT
‘Let him stay here today.’ (Hari & Lama 2004: 174)

==== Optative ====
Hari does not list an optative suffix. Gawne gives the optative -ɲi in Lamjung Yolmo.

ŋà ɲàl-ɲi tè-ku dù
1SG sleep=OPT AUX-IPFV AUX.PE
‘I want to sleep.’ (Gawne 2016: 115)

Hari & Lama (2004: 146) list ɲi- as a verb that expresses a 'strong wish’, clearly linking to the Lamjung Yolmo optative form.

==== Dubitative ====
Hari describes the dubitative as 'probable future', indicating the sense of decreased certainty that the dubitative mood marks. The forms -ʈo, -ɖo and -ro are found in Melamchi Valley Yolmo as part of the morphophonemic voicing process, but the -ro form is not found in Lamjung Yolmo.

khúŋ-gi sèn sà-ro
3PL-ERG corn.mash eat-DUB
'they will probably eat corn mash’ (Hari & Lama 2004: 237)

This verb suffix is related to the dubitative form of the copula.

=== Negation ===
Negation is marked on lexical verbs by prefix. There are two prefix forms, mè- is for negation in non-past tense (present and future), while mà- is used for past tense, as well as negation of imperatives (mà-tàp! 'don't fall'!).

ŋà mè-tàp
1sg NEG.NPST-fill
'I do not/will not fall.' (Hari 2010: 132)

ŋà mà-tàp
1sg NEG.PST-fill
'I did not fall.' (Hari 2010: 132)

The negated forms of copulas are slightly irregular. They are listed in the table below in brackets underneath the regular forms:

	Egophoric	Dubitative	Perceptual	General Fact
Equation	yìn/yìngen/yìmba (mìn/mìngen/mìmba)	yìnɖo (mìnɖo)		
Existential	yè/yèba (mè/mèba) yèken/yèba (past tense) (mèke/méba) (past tense)	yèʈo (mèʈo)	dù (mìndu) dùba (mìnduba)	òŋge (mèoŋge)

=== Verb paradigm ===
Below are verb paradigms for two verbs, the first is the intransitive verb ŋù 'cry' and the second is the transitive verb sà 'eat'. Both are given mostly with third person subject, although this is not particularly important as subject person does not affect the form of the verb. For both verbs you can see the change in verb stem. For dialect specific variation, click on the link back to each specific form.

Form	Syuba	English	Syuba	English
Infinitive	ŋù-dʑe	'to cry'	sà-tɕe	'to eat'
Simple non-past	khó ŋù-en	'he cries'	khói tó sà-en	'he eats rice'
Simple past	khó ŋù-sin	'he cried'	khói tó sà-sin	'he ate rice'
'Telling' past	khó ŋù-gyo	'he cried'	khói tó sà-gyo	'he ate rice'
Past/question form	khó ŋìi-ba	'did he cry?'/'he cried'	khói tó sèe-ba	'did he eat rice?'/'he ate rice'
Imperfective	khó ŋù-gu dù	'he is crying'	khói tó sà-gu dù	'he is eating rice
Imperfective	khó ŋìi-deraŋ yè	'he is crying'	khói tó sèe-deraŋ yè	'he is eating rice
Imperfective (Aux)	khó ŋìi tè-ku dù	'he is crying'	khói tó sèe tè-ku dù	'he is eating rice
Perfective	khó ŋìi-deraŋ yè	'he has cried'	khói tó sèe-di yè	'he has eaten rice'
Habitual	khó ŋù yè	'he cries (every day)'	khói tó sà yè	'he eats rice (every day)'
Imperative	ŋíi	'cry!'	tó sò	'eat the rice!'
Hortative	ŋù-ka / ŋù-tɕo	'let's cry!'	sà-ka / sà-tɕo	'let's eat!'
Optative	ŋù-ɲi	'I want to cry'	sa-ɲi	'I want to eat'
Dubitative	khó ŋù-ʈo	'he is probably crying'	khói tó sà-ro	'he is probably eating rice'
Negative, non-past	khó mà-ŋì	'he is not crying'	khói tó mè-sà	'he is not eating rice'
Negative, past	khó mà-ŋì	'he did not cry'	khói tó mà-sèe	'he did not eat rice'

== Clause structure ==
This section outlines some of the main features of the structure of clauses in Yolmo.

=== Nominalisation ===
Nominalisation is the process by which words undergo a change that allows them to act as nouns. While nominalisation is common process, it is particularly pervasive in Bodic languages, where it can be used for a variety of functions, including the formation of complement clauses and relative clauses. The common Bodic nominaliser -pa productively functions in Yolmo as a suffix that can mark past tense, question structures or emphasis. There are other nominalising forms in Yolmo.

Hari describes a number of nominalisers in Melamchi Valley Yolmo. The first is the nominalising suffix -ka:

dì saudʑi kár-ka yàabu tér-ku dù
this shopkeeper weight-NMLZ good give-IPFV AUX.PE
‘This shop keeper gives good weight.’ (Hari 2010: 30)

A number of other nominalising suffixes that attach to verbs have more specific functions:

Suffix	Function
-naŋ	appearance of state or action
-taŋ	displaying a forceful show
-luŋ	have time for an activity
-lu	way of doing something

In Lamjung Yolmo the most productive nominaliser is -kandi. None of the others described above have been attested. This form is not attested in Hari's description of Melamchi Valley Yolmo, but is probably related to the -ka form described above.

ŋà=ki ʈìlbu yúŋ-kandi thé-ku dù
1SG=ERG bell ring-NMLZ hear-IPFV AUX.PE
‘I hear the ringing of bells.’ (Gawne 2016: 132)

There is also a locative nominaliser -sa, which creates a noun that denotes location:

ŋà dzàra sà-sa=la ɖò-en
1SG snack eat-NMLZ.LOC=LOC go-NPST
‘I want to go to the snack place.’ (Hari 2010: 33)

=== Adverbials ===
An adverbial structure modifies the verb in some way.

==== Temporal adverbial subordination ====
Temporal adverbs can create subordinated clauses.

sà-kandi tòŋla ŋà làkpa ʈhú-ke
eat-NMLZ before 1SG hand wash-NPST
‘I wash my hands before eating.’ (Gawne 2016: 130)

Below is the list of temporal adverbs observed in Yolmo to date, some are independent words, and others are verbal suffixes:

Adverb	Translation	Additional information
nàm	'when'	
gàrila	'at the time'	Nepali loanword
bèlala	'at the time'	Nepali loanword
-kamu	'at the time'	only attested in Lamjung Yolmo
tòŋla	'before'	
tíŋla	'after'	
-tile	'after'	
-timaraŋ	'after'	
yìndʑu	'since'	only attested in Melamchi Valley Yolmo

==== Manner adverbs ====
Manner adverbs create a subordinated clause that expresses the manner of an action. The manner adverb is lèemu (lìmu in Lamjung).

khúŋ tábu límu gyùbu tɕóŋ-ku dù
3PL house like fast run-NMLZ AUX.PE
‘He runs fast like a horse.’ (Gawne 2016: 129)

The forms tíle and dènmu are also found in Lamjung Yolmo, but not yet attested in other varieties.

=== Conditional ===
Conditional constructions are formed through the use of the suffix -na on the verb in the protasis clause (the 'if' clause). Speakers will either use the -na suffix directly on the verb, or leave the verb unmarked at attach the -na suffix to the verb meaning ‘say’ (mée in Melamchi Valley Yolmo, làp in Lamjung Yolmo).

nám mà-kyàp làp-na ŋà phíla ɖò-ke
rain NEG.PST-fall say-COND 1SG outside go-NPST
‘If it doesn't rain I will go outside.’ (Gawne 2016: 130)

=== Complementation ===
A complement clause is a clause that functions as an argument of another clause. In Yolmo the embedded complement clause takes the infinitive suffix -tɕe.

ɲì=la yìgi prù-tɕe {ʈèmba sàl-toŋ}
1PL.EXCL=DAT letter write-INF remember-IMP
‘Remember to write us a letter!’ (Gawne 2016: 134)

The optative mood suffix -ɲi in Yolmo can also be said to be acting as a complementiser.

=== Relativisation ===
A relative clause is depended on a main clause. Different relativising strategies are used in the two described varieties of Yolmo. In Melamchi Valley Yolmo the non-past tense form -ken(-gi) is used for non-past constructions, and the past tense form -kyo(-gi) is used for past tense constructions (for each the -gi is optional). Similarly, in Lamjung Yolmo, -ke-ki can be used for non-past relativised clauses and -pa-ki for past relativised clauses. This difference reflects the fact that the past tense form -kyo is not found in Lamjung Yolmo.

òze bèle aʑi=gi gòo thóo=la tɕáŋ-gyo-gi làawor phók táŋ-sin dù ló
that time sister=GEN head above=LOC hang-REL mill.stone INT send-PST AUX.PE RS
'At that moment (the monster) swiftly loosened the mill stone which was hanging just above the head of the elder sister.' (Hari 2010: 76)

khyá=ki prù-prù-pa-ki yìgi
2PL=GEN write-write-REL letter
'The letter that you wrote.' (Gawne 2016: 134)

In Lamjung Yolmo, the nominaliser -kandi can be used to make a relative clause:

khím sáŋma pè-kandi mì nà-sin dù
house clean do=NMLZ person ill-PST AUX.PE
'The person who cleans the house is ill.' (Gawne 2016: 135)

=== Clause chaining ===
The perfective suffix -ti is used to chain clauses together. Multiple verbs with this suffix can be stacked to create a complex series of events.

tɕádzuŋma tɕíi òŋ-ti ʈúu-ti khér-sin
bird one come-PFV pick.up-PFV carry.away-PST
'A bird came, picked up (a fish) and took (it) away.' (Gawne 2016: 136)

=== Question formation ===
Word order does not change to form questions in Yolmo. Rising intonation at the end of the utterance can indicate it is a question. A set of interrogative pronouns are used for open content questions.

The -pa suffix, which was introduced in the section on past tense is used in question structures.

khé tó sà-pa
2SG rice.cooked eat-Q
‘Did you eat cooked rice?’ (Gawne 2016: 139)

The reply would be with the regular past tense, and not the -pa suffix:

ŋà tó sà-sin
1SG rice.cooked eat-PST
‘I ate rice.’ (Gawne 2016: 139)

The copula form used in a question matches the form the question-asked anticipates the question-answerer will use in their answer. That is, if they anticipate the answer will use the perceptual evidential dù, this is the form they will use in asking the question.

=== Reported speech ===
Yolmo has two strategies for reporting speech, the first is using the lexical verb má or làp 'say', the second is using the clause final evidential particle ló.

==== Lexical verb ====
In Melamchi Valley Yolmo the main lexical verb of saying is má, in Lamjung Yolmo it is làp. Hari and Lama note that làp is found in Melamchi Valley Yolmo, but in restricted use. If the speaker, and the person the speech is directed at are overtly marked, these usually proceed the reported content (although they are frequently not overt in natural speech). The 'say' verb prototypically occurs after the reported content, although if the reported content is quite long the verb may occasionally come before it.

khó-ni níŋdʑi ɕóŋ-gen-gi pèza-raŋ mìmba áma-gi mì pò-la má-en
3SG-FOC love feel child-EMPH COP.NEG.EMPH mother-ERG people near-DAT say-NPST
'Mother says to people nearby, "He is not a lovable child!"' (Hari & Lama 2004: 383)

The lexical verb 'say' is also used in a number of other constructions, including conditionals.

==== Reported speech evidential ====
The reported speech particle also indicates that the speaker is reporting a prior utterance, but has a different focus. The reported speech particle does not account for who the speaker way, but instead primarily serves to focus on the fact the information is reported, and not directly witnessed by the speaker. In the example below from Syuba, it is not made explicit if the report comes from Maila, or another person. The reported speech evidential occurs frequently in narratives.

tíriŋ Maila tóm phré-si ló
today Maila bear meet-PST RS
‘Today Maila met a bear.’ (Höhlig 1978: 22)

This is part of the wider evidential system of Yolmo, which is also found in the copula verbs above.

=== Lexical emphasis ===
There are two emphatic suffixes that can be used with a number of word classes. This is in contrast to the emphatic form -ti, which is only used with nouns. The first is -ni, and the second is -raŋ, which Hari & Lama note is a frequently used emphatic marker in informal speech. The distinction between all of these forms is unclear, although Hari refers to the -ni form as used for 'moderate focus', so it is perhaps less emphatic for nouns than the -ti suffix.

=== Clause final particles ===
Yolmo has a series of sentence final particles that can be used to achieve a range of effects. The table below gives some of the particles in Yolmo and a brief description of their function.

Particle	Function
ló	reported speech
nà	emphasis/insistence
yàŋ	emphasis/focus
làa	polite
lé	pleading
lò	friendly/encouraging
óo	invoking/encouraging

The reported speech marker ló is an evidential form, as it indicates the source of the information as someone else. This structure is described in the section on reported speech.

== Honorifics ==
Yolmo has a subset of honorific vocabulary which is used when talking to, or about, people of higher social status, particularly Buddhist Lamas. Honorific lexicon includes nouns, verbs and adjectives. The table below gives some examples, including the regular word, the honorific form, and the English translation.

Regular form	Honorific form	English
tér	nàŋ	'give'
ɲí lòo	zìm	'sleep'
sà	ɕè	'eat'
ába	yàp	'father'
áma	yùm	'mother'
káŋba	ɕàp	'foot/leg'
gòo	ú	'head'
ɕìmbu	ɲéebu	'tasty'

The use of honorifics in Syuba and Lamjung Yolmo is not as common, although some speakers still recognise and use these forms.

== 100 word Swadesh list ==
Below is a 100 word Swadesh list in Yolmo. The Yolmo forms are taken from Hari and Lama, who note some variation between the Eastern (E) and Western (W) varieties in the Melamchi and Helambu Valley area. Where the form is different in other varieties this is indicated in the right-hand column of the table. This variation shows that the Lamjung variety and Syuba have more in common with each other lexically than they do with the Melamchi Valley variety.

Swadesh item	English	Yolmo	Variation
1.	I	ŋà	
2.	thou	khyá	
3.	we	ɲì	
4.	this	dì	
5.	that	òo	òodi in Lamjung Yolmo and Syuba
6.	who?	sú	
7.	what?	tɕí	
8.	not	mè-, mì-	
9.	all	thámdʑi	dzàmma in Lamjung Yolmo, t^{h}ámdze in Syuba
10.	many	màŋbu	
11.	one	tɕíi	
12.	two	ŋyíi	
13.	a	tɕhímbu, tɕhómbo	only tɕ^{h}ómbo reported in Lamjung Yolmo and Syuba
14.	long	rìŋbu	
15.	small	tɕhéemu	tɕéemi in Lamjung YOlmo
16.	woman	pìihmi	pèmpiʑa in Lamjung Yolmo and Syuba [ pèmpiʑa' occurs in Melamchi Yolmo where it means woman collectively whereas pìihmi refers to woman ]
17.	man	khyówa	k^{h}yópiʑa in Lamjung Yolmo and Syuba [ Khyopiza occurs in Melamchi Yolmo where it means men collectively, whereas khyowa refers to husband] [Source/ I speak the language]
18.	person	mì	
19.	fish	ɲà	
20.	bird	tɕà-tɕìwa	tɕádzuŋma in Lamjung Yolmo and Syuba
21.	dog	kyíbu, khyí	khí in Lamjung Yolmo and Syuba
22.	louse	kiɕíkpa, kyíɕi	ɕí in Lamjung Yolmo and Syuba
23.	tree	tòŋbo, tùŋbu	only tòŋbo reported in Lamjung Yolmo and Syuba
24.	seed	sén	
25.	leaf	làpti, lòma	
26.	root	tsárkyi, tsárŋyi, tsárnɲe	
27.	bark	páko, phíko, kóldaŋ	phába in Lamjung Yolmo
28.	skin	páaba (E), páko (W)	gòoba in Lamjung Yolmo and Syuba
29.	lesh	ɕá	
30.	blood	ʈháa	
31.	bone	rèko, rìiba (E)	ròko in Lamjung Yolmo and Syuba
32.	grease	khyákpa tɕháa	
33.	egg	tɕàmu kòŋa	
34.	horn	ròwa	rùwa in Syuba
35.	tail	ŋáma, ŋéma	ŋámaŋ in Lamjung Yolmo
36.	feather	ʈò (E), ʈòo (W)	ɕókpa in Lamjung Yolmo
37.	hair	ʈá	
38.	head	gòo	
39.	ear	námdʑo	
40.	eye	míi	
41.	nose	náasum (E), nárko (W)	only náasum reported in Lamjung Yolmo and Syuba
42.	mouth	khá	
43.	tooth	só	
44.	tongue	tɕéle	tɕé in Lamjung Yolmo and Syuba
45.	fingernail	sému	
46.	foot	káŋba	
47.	knee	káŋba-tshíi	tshíiŋgor in Lamjung Yolmo, pìmu in Syuba
48.	hand	làkpa	
49.	belly	ʈèpa	
50.	neck	dzìŋba	
51.	breast	òma	
52.	heart	níŋ	
53.	liver	tɕìmba	
54.	drink	thúŋ-	
55.	eat	sà-	
56.	bite	kàp-, áa táp-	
57.	see	tá, thóŋ-	
58.	hear	thée-, ɲìn-	thée-, ɲèn in Lamjung Yolmo and Syuba
59.	know	ɕée-	
60.	sleep	ɲí lòo-	ɲàl- in Lamjung Yolmo and Syuba
61.	die	ɕí-	
62.	kill	sé-	
63.	swim	tɕál kyàp-	
64.	fly	ùr-	
65.	walk	ɖò-	
66.	come	òŋ-	
67.	lie	ɲàl-	
68.	sit	tè-	
69.	stand	làŋ-di té-	
70.	give	tér-	
71.	say	má-, làp-	only làp- in Lamjung Yolmo and Syuba
72.	sun	ɲìma	
73.	moon	dàwa, dàyum	dàgarmu in Lamjung Yolmo and Syuba
74.	star	kárma	
75.	water	tɕhú	
76.	rain	nám kyàp-	
77.	stone	tò	
78.	sand	pèma	
79.	earth	sása, thása, sáʑa, sáptɕi	sébi in Syuba
80.	cloud	múkpa	
81.	smoke	tìpa, tèpa	only tìpa reported in Lamjung Yolmo and Syuba
82.	fire	mè	
83.	ash	thála	
84.	burn	tìi-, bàr-, tshíi-	
85.	path	làm	
86.	mountain	kàŋ	
87.	red	màrmu, màrpu	
88.	green	ŋòmbo, ŋùmbu	
89.	yellow	sérpu	
90.	white	kárpu, kármu	
91.	black	nàkpu	
92.	night	kùŋmu	
93.	hot	ʈòmo	ʈòmbo in Lamjung Yolmo and Syuba
94.	cold	ʈàŋmu	
95.	full	kàŋ	
96.	new	sámba	
97.	good	yàabu	
98.	round	kòrmu (circular), rhílmu (spherical)	
99.	dry	kámbu	
100.	name	mìn	Unlike almost all other Tibetic languages, this word is mìn and not mìŋ

== See also ==
- Kyirong–Kagate languages
- Kyirong language
- Kagate language
- Tibetic languages

== External resources ==
- Open access digital collection of Anna Marie Hari's cassette recordings of Melamchi Valley Yolmo from the 1970s and 1980s at PARADISEC.
- Digital collection of Lauren Gawne's documentation of Lamjung Yolmo (2009-2016) at PARADISEC (partly open access)
- Three open access collections of Syuba, a dialect closely related to Yolmo, MH1 digitised from 1970s recordings, SUY1 documentation by Lauren Gawne (2009-2016), MTC1 a 2013 BOLD documentation by the Mother Tongue Centre Nepal.

== Key references ==
- Clarke, Graham E. (1980). "A Helambu History". Journal of the Nepal Research Centre. 4: 1–38.
- Clarke, Graham E. (1980). "Lama and Tamang in Yolmo." Tibetan Studies in honor of Hugh Richardson. M. Aris and A. S. S. Kyi (eds). Warminster, Aris and Phillips: 79-86.
- Gawne, Lauren (2011). Lamjung Yolmo-Nepali-English dictionary. Melbourne, Custom Book Centre; The University of Melbourne.
- Gawne, Lauren (2016). A Sketch Grammar of Lamjung Yolmo. Canberra: Asia Pacific Linguistics. hdl:1885/110258. ISBN 9781922185341. OCLC 961180469.
- Hari, Anna Maria & Chhegu Lama (2004). Dictionary Yolhmo-Nepali-English. Kathmandu: Central Department of Linguistics, Tribhuvan University.
- Hari, Anna Maria (2010). Yohlmo Sketch Grammar. Kathmandu: Ekta books.
- Hedlin, Matthew (2011). An Investigation of the relationship between the Kyirong, Yòlmo, and Standard Spoken Tibetan speech varieties. Masters thesis, Payap University, Chiang Mai
