= Yolmo people =

Indigenous group of Nepal

The Yolmo or Hyolmo (Tibetic: ཡོལ་མོ་) are a people mainly from the Eastern and Northern Himalayan Regions of Nepal called Helambu. They refer to themselves as the "Yolmowa" or "Yolmopa" and are native residents of the Helambu valleys (situated over 43.4 kilometres/27 miles and 44.1 kilometres/27.4 miles to the north of Kathmandu respectively) and the surrounding regions of Northeastern Nepal. The combined population in these regions is around 11,000. They also have sizeable communities in Bhutan, Darjeeling, Sikkim and some regions of South-Western Tibet. They are among the 59 indigenous groups officially recognized by the Government of Nepal as having a distinct cultural identity and are also listed as one of the 645 Scheduled Tribes of India.

The Yolmo people speak the Yolmo language of the Kyirong branch of the Sino-Tibetan language family. Accordingly, it has a high lexical similarity to Tibetan, although the two languages are not completely mutually intelligible.

== Etymology ==
The term "Yolmo" consists of two separate words "Yul-" means "a place or area surrounded by high mountains", and "Mo", which means "goddess", indicating a place under the protection of a female deity. For centuries, Tibetan Buddhists have referred to the Helambu region using the term "Yolmo". In recent years, most people, Yolmos and otherwise, seem to prefer the name "Helambu". It is also often claimed that the name "Helambu" is derived from the Yolmo words for potatoes and radishes (Hey means "potato" and lahbu means "radish"). This etymology, however, is disputed and often considered spurious. Some refuters of this explanation argue that "Helambu" is an ambiguation of the word "Yolmo" phonetically contoured by the speakers of Nepali.

There is an ongoing discussion amongst Yolmo scholars regarding the spelling of "Yolmo" in the Latin script. Some favour "Yolmo" while others prefer "Hyolmo" or "Yholmo" wherein the presence of the letter "H" indicates that the first syllable of the word is spoken with a low, breathy tone. Robert R. Desjarlais (except in his most recent work) and Graham E. Clarke (works cited below) both use "Yolmo", while the Nepal Aadivasi Janajati Mahasangh (Nepal Federation of Indigenous Nationalities) uses "Yolmo".

== Culture ==
=== Society ===
The Yolmo are an ethnolinguistic group primarily found in the Himalayan regions of Nepal and Tibet.

==== Ancestry and Customs ====
Yolmo communities trace their ancestral roots to the Kyirong region of Tibet and maintain strong ties to Tibetan Buddhist traditions and monastic lineages. Within Yolmo society, several clans are recognized, including Nyingma Lama (Buram Shyingpa), Terngilinpa, Sarma Lama, Lhalungpa, Lama Dhomare, Jyapa, Chujang, Nyima Hoser Lama, and Lhoba. Other clans—such as Shyangba (Shyanbo/Shyanten), Dongba (Dong), Yeba (Waiba), Yonchhen (Yonjoun), Thongso, and Gole (Ghaley)—are found in both Yolmo and Tamang communities. Because some Tamang surnames also appear among Yolmo families, further research is needed to determine whether these groups share origins in the Kyirong region.

All Yolmo subgroups follow the patrilineal system of descent."Bride-stealing" used to be a staple among their customs but it is no longer practiced or encouraged.

=== Religion ===
Their primary religion is Tibetan Buddhism of the Nyingmapa school, intermixed with animism and paganism as incorporated within the general dimensions of Bon.

=== Language ===
The Yolmo language shares high lexical similarity with Tibetan. It is traditionally transcribed in the Sambhoti (Tibetan) script, but many modern academics use the Devanagari script as well. The Yolmo language is also very closely related to Kagate, another language of the Kyirong–Kagate language sub-group.

=== Economy ===
Essentially, the Yolmo people are agriculturalists. Potatoes, radishes, and some other crops constitute their primary sustenance, along with milk and meat from the yak which the Yolmo are known to herd. In the last few decades, the Helambu region has also become a popular site for tourism and trekking, and many Yolmowa are now employed in the tourism industry as tour-guides either in their own respective villages or in various other parts of Nepal.

=== The "Kagate" ===
An ethnic group related to the Yolmowa are the Kagate (or Kagatay) who stem from the original Yolmo inhabitants of the Helambu, Melamchi Nimadumbu valleys. What distinguishes them is that the Kagate began migrating southeast from Helambu, and eventually, into the Ramechhap District over 100 years ago, and that they practiced the craft of paper-making during their peregrinations in order to make a living — thereby earning themselves the moniker "Kagate" (which is Nepali for "paper-maker"). They have since developed certain characteristics in their speech that are distinct from traditional Hyolmo. The Yolmo speaking groups in the Lamjung District and Ilam District have also historically been called "Kagate" although both groups claim a clear distinction between themselves and the Kagate of Ramechhap. However, "Yolmo" and "Kagate" are often used as terms for both the ethnic group and their dialect interchangeably.

== Distribution ==
=== Nepal ===
According to the Nepal National Census of 2011, the population of the Yolmo people living within Nepal is 10,752, who are distributed over 11 districts of the country, and 99% of this population speak the Yolmo language. However, the number of monolingual Yolmo speakers is very low and on a gradual decline, as the number of monolingual Nepali-speaking Yolmo and bilingual Hyolmo with English as their second language increases. The largest Yolmo settlements in Nepal (and also internationally) are in the Helambu and Melamchi valleys which are home to over 10,000 Yolmo. A separate group of about 700 reside in the Lamjung district while some have settled closer to Pokhara. There are also a number of villages in the Ilam district where Yolmo is spoken.

=== India ===
The Yolmos are listed as a Scheduled Tribe in the states of West Bengal and Sikkim in India.

=== Bhutan ===
The Yolmo language is also spoken by significant populations in Bhutan.

== Notable people ==
Yolmo Ngagchang Sakya Zangpo : Tantric master who lived in the late fifteenth century and beginning of the sixteenth century
