= Kagate language =

Sino-Tibetan language spoken in Nepal

Kagate
- Syuba
- स्युबा
- The word "Syuba" written in Devanagari script
- Region: Nepal
- Native speakers: 1,500 (2012)
- Language family: Sino-Tibetan: Tibeto-Kanauri ?; Bodish; Tibetic; Kyirong–Kagate; Kagate

Language codes
- ISO 639-3: syw
- Glottolog: kaga1252
- ELP: Kagate
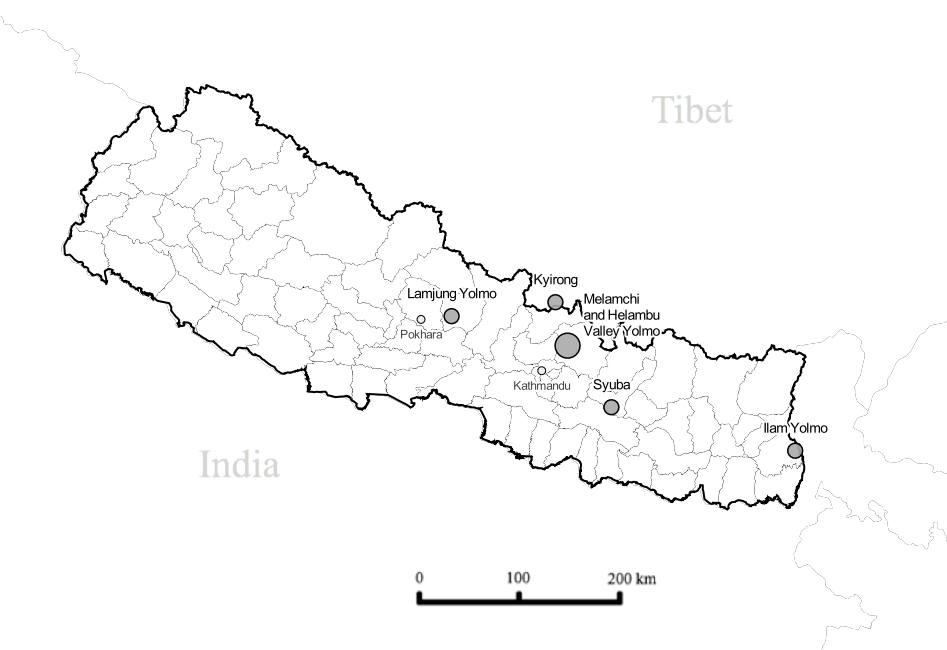

Kagate or Syuba is a language from the subgroup of Tibetic languages spoken by the Kagate people primarily in the Ramechhap district of Nepal.

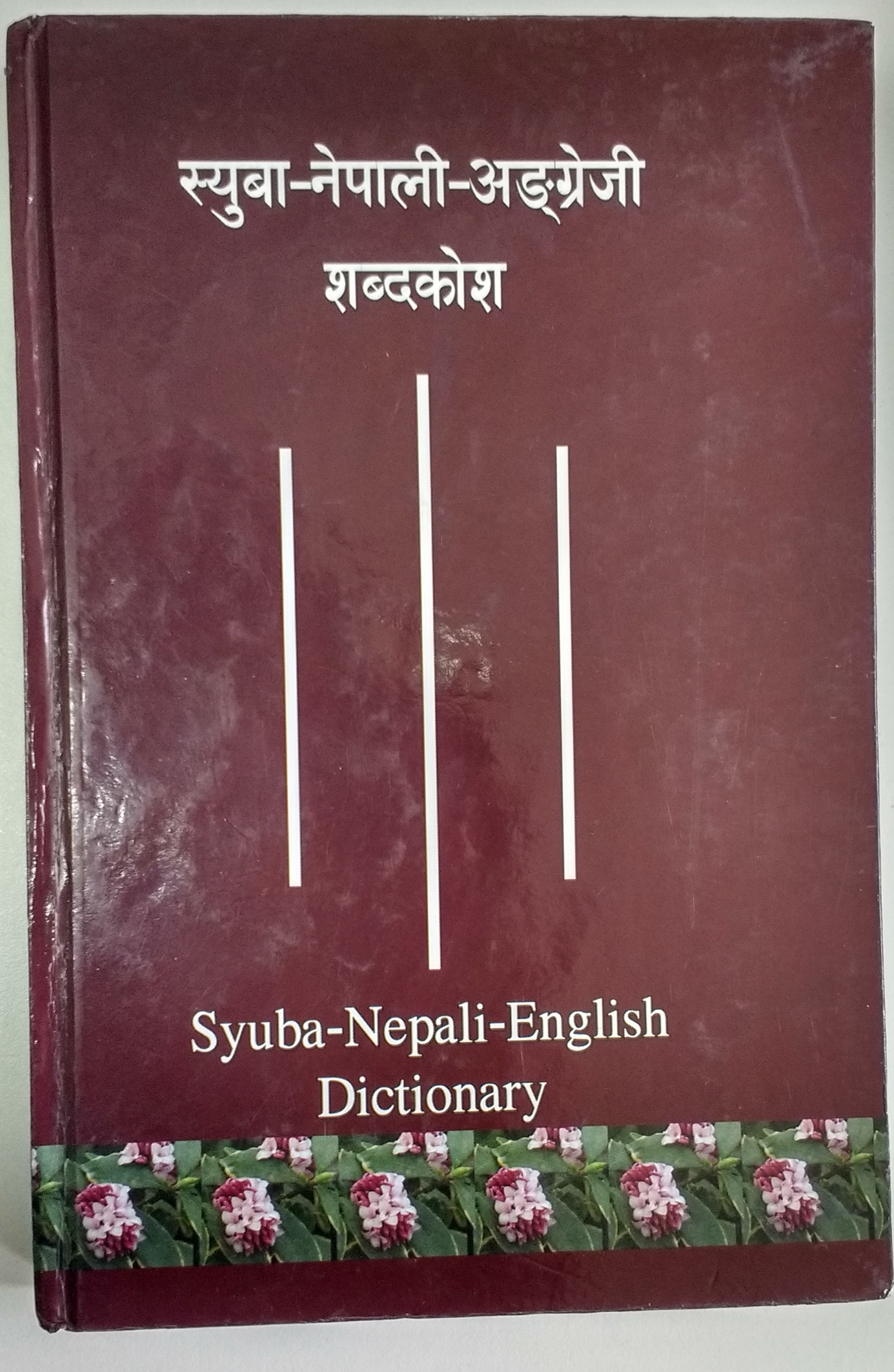

== Language name ==
Kagate is an exonym. It is the Nepali word for the occupation of 'papermaker', reflecting an earlier occupation of the community. This is the name under which the language was documented in Grierson's 1909 linguistic survey of India, and by which it is classified in the ISO 639-3 code. Speakers now prefer the endonym Syuba, which also refers to the occupation of papermaker. This name is mentioned in documentation literature from the 1970s, and speakers are now using this form more actively, see as an example the Syuba-Nepali-English dictionary.

== History ==
Kagate speakers migrated from the Yolmo area of Helambu around 100–200 years ago. This was likely the result of population pressure in the Yolmo area. Kagate speakers settled in Ramecchap. There are now at least 8 Kagate villages in Ramechhap, and Kagate speakers also live in Kathmandu and other urban areas. Kagate was first documented in Grierson's 1909 linguistic survey of India, because Kagate speakers were working in Darjeeling. The Syuba language is currently still spoken across all generations, including children.

== Orthography ==
An orthography for the language was developed for the publication of the Syuba-Nepali-English dictionary. This orthography is Devanagari-based with modifications to represent the sounds of the Syuba language. The modifications to Devanagari are minor, and are intended to ensure that all sounds in the language can be represented. The 'inherent schwa vowel' of Devanagari is not used, meaning that a consonant without an overt vowel is not treated as having an implied vowel. Consonants remain the same as in the existing Devanagari tradition, with the use of joined digraphs to represent additional sounds in the language, such as the combination of क (k) and य (y) for the palatal stop क्य ([c] 'kh'), स (s) and य (y) for the palatal fricative स्य ([ʃ] 'sh'), र and ह for the voiceless liquid र्ह ([r̥] 'rh'), and ल and ह for the voiceless lateral ल्ह ([l̥] 'lh'). Vowel length is not distinguished. Tone is distinguished using an additional diacritic after the vowel, so tó 'rice' (high tone) is तो while tò 'stone' (low tone) is तोः.

The Syuba-Nepali-English dictionary also uses a Roman orthography. This orthography is represented in the Phonology section below. In the Roman orthography tone is marked using a superscript ^{L} at the start of the syllable to mark low tone (e.g. ^{L}to 'stone') with high tone unmarked.

== Relationship to other languages ==
There is a varying degree of mutual intelligibility between Syuba and other Kyirong-Yolmo varieties. It is most closely related to the Yolmo language, and more distantly related to other languages in the family. The lexical similarity between Syuba and Melamchi Valley Yolmo is at least 79%, with the similarity between Syuba and Lamjung Yolmo even higher (88%).

While the languages are similar, Syuba speakers see their language as distinct from Yolmo. Syuba also has a separate ISO 639-3 code (swy instead of scp).

== Phonology ==
=== Consonants ===
There are 36 consonants in Syuba, which are summarized in the table below. The form is given in IPA and then to the right in brackets is given the form more frequently used in Roman orthography if different.

			Labial	Apico-Dental		Lamino- post-alveolar	Retroflex	Palatal	Velar	Glottal
Nasal			m	n				ɲ	ŋ	
Plosive/ Affricate	voiceless		p	t	ts	tɕ	ʈ	c ⟨ky⟩	k	
Plosive/ Affricate	aspirated		pʰ ⟨ph⟩	tʰ ⟨th⟩	tsʰ ⟨tsh⟩	tɕʰ ⟨tɕh⟩	ʈʰ ⟨ʈh⟩	cʰ ⟨khy⟩	kʰ ⟨kh⟩	
Plosive/ Affricate	voiced		b	d	dz	dʑ	ɖ	ɟ ⟨gy⟩	ɡ	
Fricative	voiceless			s		ɕ				h
Fricative	voiced			z		ʑ				
Liquid	rhotic	voiceless		r̥ ⟨rh⟩						
Liquid	rhotic	voiced		r						
Liquid	lateral	voiceless		l̥ ⟨lh⟩						
Liquid	lateral	voiced		l						
Semivowel			w					j ⟨y⟩		

=== Vowels ===
There are five places of articulation for vowels. While there is a length distinction in closely related varieties such as Yolmo and Kyirong, the current Syuba orthography does not mark vowel length, and the status of vowel length is therefore unclear. In Roman orthographies the [ɔ] is usually written ⟨o⟩.

	Front	Mid	Back
High	i		u
Mid	e		ɔ
Low		a	

=== Tone ===
Syuba has a two-tone language system, with tone located on the first syllable of a word.

pú	'body hair'
pù	'son'
tó	'rice (cooked)'
tò	'stone'

Tone is predictable in some environments. It is always high following aspirated stops, aspirated affricates and voiceless liquids (which speakers treat as equivalent to aspirated). Tone is always low following voiced stops, voiced fricatives and voiced affricates. Tone can be high or low in all other environments.

== Grammar ==
The grammar of Syuba shares many features with other varieties of Yolmo. A more extensive grammatical overview is available on the Yolmo language page. This section provides an overview of those features that are distinct in the Syuba variety.

=== Plural marking ===
The plural form in other varieties of Yolmo is =ya. In Syuba the plural is =kya. This is more similar to the Kyirong form, suggesting the Yolmo =ya is an innovation.

=== Fixed verb stems ===
Verb stems in the Melamchi Valley variety of Yolmo alternate depending on the grammatical context, which is a process also seen in Standard Tibetan and other Tibetic languages. This does not happen in Syuba,

nor does it happen in Lamjung Yolmo.

=== Use of Honorific forms ===
Syuba does not use honorific word forms as frequently as they are used in Melamchi Valley Yolmo.

== Sources ==
- Gawne, Lauren. (2010). "Lamjung Yolmo: a dialect of Yolmo, also known as Helambu Sherpa." Nepalese Linguistics 25: 34-41. PDF
- Gawne, Lauren. (2013). "Notes on the relationship between Yolmo and Kagate." Himalayan Linguistics 12(2), 1-27. PDF
- Gawne, Lauren. (2014). "Similar languages, different dictionaries: A discussion of the Lamjung Yolmo and Kagate dictionary projects." In G. Zuckermann, J. Miller & J. Morley (eds.), Endangered Words, Signs of Revival. Adelaide: AustraLex. PDF
- Grierson, George Abraham. (1909/1966). Linguistic survey of India (2d ed.). Delhi: M. Banarsidass.
- Höhlig, Monika. (1978). "Speaker orientation in Syuwa (Kagate)." In J. E. Grimes (ed.), Papers on discourse. Kathmandu: Summer Institute of Linguistics, 50: 19-24.
- Höhlig, Monika. (1976). Kagate phonemic summary. Kathmandu: Summer Institute of Linguistics Institute of Nepal and Asian Studies. with Anna Maria Hari.
- Mitchell, Jessica R. & Stephanie R. Eichentopf. (2013). Sociolinguistic survey of Kagate: Language vitality and community desires. Kathmandu: Central Department of Linguistics Tribhuvan University, Nepal and SIL International.
- Teo, A., L. Gawne & M. Baese-Berk. (2015). "Tone and intonation: A case study in two Tibetic languages." Proceedings of the 18th International Conference on Phonetic Sciences. PDF
