= Lama clan (Tamang) =

Priestly clan of the Tamang people

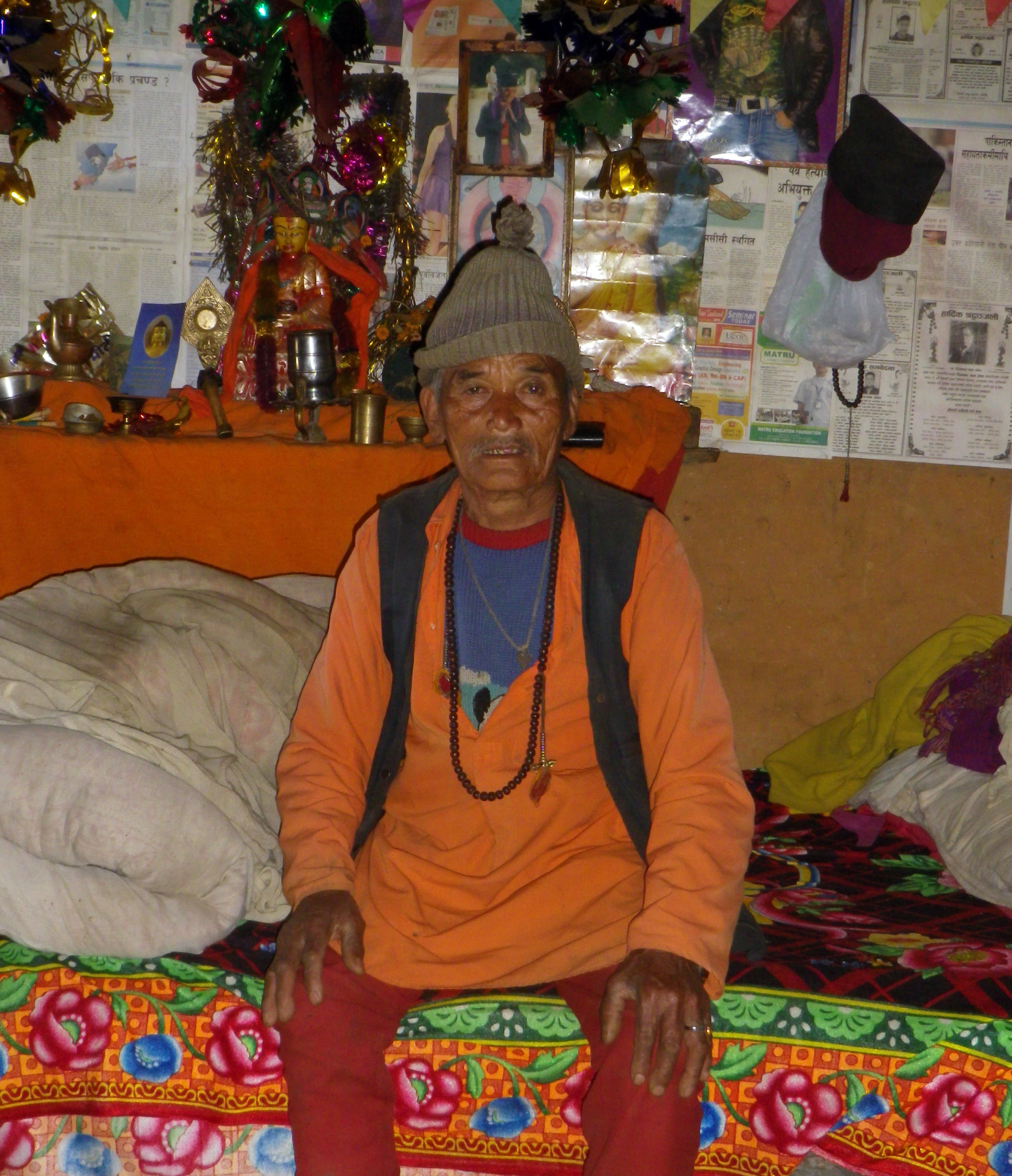
Buddhist Lama of the Tamang People, Tistung, Nepal

The Lama of the Tamang people, is an ancient priestly clan having resided in the area now known as Nepal since antiquity and predating the spread of Buddhism, is associated with spiritual and religious dealings, including ancestor worship Additionally, other Swagen Bhai (Tamang kinship clans) perform priestly rituals, such as shaman Jhankris, but the Lama are most associated with priesthood.

This particular Swagen Bhai (kinship clan) of the Tamang are so associated with religion that all Tamangs are addressed as Lama by other highland Tibeto-Burman ethnic groups in the region, such as Gurung, Sherpa, etc. Nevertheless, only those of Swagen Bhai Lama are truly Lama. As with all Swagen Bhai, there are complex restrictions on intermarriage between kinship clans. The exact relationship between Bon Lamaism, their religion of antiquity that survives to modern times, Gurung Dharma, the religion of a nearby and related ethnolinguistically close people, and Bon Buddhist tradition (Bonpa), has not been established. Nevertheless, the Tamang are considered to be least influenced by Khas-ization of all ethnic groups in Nepal, in addition to being the most connected to traditional religion of the Southern Himalayan region.
