= Mugom dialect =

Sino-Tibetan language of western Nepal

Mugom
- Native to: Nepal
- Ethnicity: Mugali
- Native speakers: 7,500 (2011 census)
- Language family: Sino-Tibetan: Tibeto-Burman; Tibeto-Kanauri; Bodish; Tibetic; Central Tibetan; Mugom–Karmarong; Mugom

Language codes
- ISO 639-3: muk
- Glottolog: muga1241 Mugali
- Coordinates: 29.588920, 82.447829

Mugom language, also known as Mugom-ket, is the Sino-Tibetan language of the Mugali people of Mugu district in Nepal.

== Language name ==
Mugom speakers self-identify as “Moa,” and are referred to as “Mugali” by non-Tibetan peoples of the area. Mugom speakers simply refer to their language as “mugu jillako bhote bhasa,” lit. ‘the Tibetan language of Mugu district.’

== Speakers ==
Mugom is spoken by roughly 500 people originating from the village of Mugugau along the Mugu Karnali River in Mugum Karmarong Rural Municipality. The language is specifically associated with Mugali people. A small diaspora community of Mugali exists in Bouddha, in the northeast part of Kathmandu.

== Language vitality ==
In 2002, a sociolinguistic study found that Mugom speakers in diaspora consistently used their own language with each other, and that the language was being transmitted to children. The Ethnologue has assigned EGIDS level 6a “vigorous” to the Mugom–Karmarong (ISO 639-3: muk). This level denotes oral use of Mugom is stable, and that the speaker population is not decreasing.

== Resources ==
- Mugom primer: A clear reflection of Mugom: Book 1
- Mugom primer: A clear reflection of Mugom: Book 2
- Sociolinguistic Study: Japola, Mari-Sisco. (2002). Mugom Survey. United Mission to Nepal, Mugu Education Project internal report: unpublished.

== Notes ==
There have been attempts to create health-education materials aimed at the Mugali and Karani that take into account their culture and levels of literacy specifically.
