= Kyirong–Kagate languages =

Tibetic language subgroup of Nepal and China

Kyirong–Kagate
- Region: Nepal, China
- Native speakers: (16,000 cited 2000 – 2011 census)
- Language family: Sino-Tibetan: Tibeto-Kanauri ?; Bodish; Tibetic; Kyirong–Kagate

Language codes
- ISO 639-3: Variously: kgy – Kyirong syw – Kagate ttz – Tsum scp – Hyolmo gyo – Gyalsumdo
- Glottolog: kyir1235 adds Nubri

Kyirong–Kagate is a subgroup of Tibetic languages spoken primarily in Nepal, with a hundred or so speakers across the border in Tibet.

Varieties are:

Kyirong (Lende), Kagate, Tsum, Langtang, Yolmo, Nubri, Gyalsumdo

Although there is a varying degree of mutual intelligibility between these varieties, they are considered separate languages by their respective speakers. There are also some major distinctions. For example, Kyirong has a three-tone system whereas Yolmo and Kagate have a two-tone system. The Gyalsumdo language variety spoken in the Manage district of Nepal shows strong similarities to Kyirong, as well as Nubri, and would therefore likely be classed in the "Kyirong–Kagate" group.

== Terminological limitation ==
The language family is best considered to really be Kyirong–Yolmo. This is for a number of reasons; firstly, there are only around 1000 people who identify as Kagate, and many of these also consider themselves to be Yolmo. Secondly, Kagate is only regularly used to identify the community in Ramechhap, while Yolmo can be found in Melamchi, Helambu, Ilam, Lamjung and other places. Thirdly, the name Kagate is considered negative by many speakers, as it refers to the low-caste occupation of papermaking.

== Variation between languages ==
These varieties are all clearly historically related, but some are more similar than others. Kagate and Yolmo share many common features, and can be considered mutually intelligible dialects. Nubri and Gyalsumdo also appear to be closely related, based on initial research. Although Yolmo and Kyirong are more similar to each other than they are to Standard Tibetan, they are different enough to be considered different languages.
