= Gyalsumdo language =

Tibetic language

Gyalsumdo
- ग्याल्सुस्दो
- Native to: Nepal
- Native speakers: 200 (2011)
- Language family: Sino-Tibetan: Tibeto-Burman; Tibeto-Kanauri; Bodish; Kyirong–Kagate; Gyalsumdo

Language codes
- ISO 639-3: gyo
- Glottolog: gyal1236
- ELP: Gyalsumdo
- Gyasumdo is classified as Definitely Endangered by the UNESCO Atlas of the World's Languages in Danger.

Gyalsumdo (Gyasumdo, ग्याल्सुस्दो) is a mostly undocumented Tibetic language spoken by an estimated 200 individuals of the Manang District in the Gandaki Zone of Nepal.

== History ==
According to Michael Vinding, the Gyasumdo Tibetans are descended from migrants from locations near the Tibetan border, such as Kyirong.

=== Documentation ===
Prior to 2011, very little had ever been published on Gyalsumdo. Vinding included Gyalsumdo kinship terms in a 1979 paper. George van Driem wrongly listed "Gyasumdo" as a Tamangic language. Gyalsumdo has been situated in the vicinity of Tamangic languages for some time.

== Status ==
The Atlas of the World's Languages in Danger (2010) reported that "Gyasumdo" was "definitely endangered". Younger Gyalsumdo only learn to understand and not speak Gyalsumdo, speaking Nepali instead, and Gyalsumdo villages are being depopulated slowly due to emigration.

== Classification ==
The language is reportedly closely related to the nearby Nubri and Tsum languages, which share a large proportion of vocabulary. David Snellgrove reported in a 1961 book that the language spoken in Gyasumdo, 'Meeting-place of Three Highways', was little different from Central Tibetan, and that children were taught Classical Tibetan there. Vinding reported that "according to themselves a dialect closely related to the dialects spoken in Nubri and Tsum areas towards the east." The online language database Glottolog classifies Gyalsumdo and Nubri as dialects of one language. Gyalsumdo is also described as being somewhat intelligible by speakers of Nar-Phu.

== Phonology ==
=== Tone ===
Gyalsumdo is a tonal language; however in Gyalsumdo, unlike most other Central Tibetan languages, the word, rather than the syllable acts as the tone bearing unit.
