= Nubri language =

Sino-Tibetan language of Nepal

Nubri
- Kutang Bhotia, Larkye
- ནུབ་རི, लार्क्या भोटे
- Native to: Nepal
- Native speakers: (2,000 cited 2001 census)
- Language family: Sino-Tibetan: Tibeto-Burman; Tibeto-Kanauri; Bodish; Tibetic; Kyirong–Kagate; Nubri
- Dialects: Lho; Sama; Prok
- Writing system: None

Language codes
- ISO 639-3: kte
- Glottolog: nubr1243
- ELP: Nubri
- Nubri is classified as Definitely Endangered by the UNESCO Atlas of the World's Languages in Danger.

Geographic distribution of Tibetic languages of Nepal (including Nubri)

Nubri (Tibetan: ནུབ་རི; Devanagari: लार्क्या भोटे) is a Tibeto-Burman language spoken by about 2000 ethnically Tibetan people living in Nubri Valley in northern Central Nepal, upper Gorkhā District of Gandaki Province. Nubri has at least three dialects as typified by the Prok, Lho and Sama village varieties. Nubri is largely undocumented and undescribed, with the exception of a lexicon. Nubri is perhaps most closely related to neighbouring Tsum language and the Kyirong variety of Tibetan spoken just across the border in Tibet. It has also been claimed to be closely related to Gyalsumdo. Like these languages it is tonal and shares many Tibetic grammatical features, but is uniquely different in many ways.

The Nubri language project started in 2017 at the University of Hong Kong (HKU) with the aim of studying and documenting this language. Recent work includes studies of the case marking and tone as well as a valley-wide sociolinguistic survey which confirmed its classification as "definitely endangered." Building from this, a recent effort towards language maintenance involved initiating community discussions about a writing system for Nubri. This was carried out in May 2019 in conjunction with a cataract clinic funded by the same HKU Knowledge Exchange grant (PI Cathryn Donohue).
