= Tsum language =

Tibetic language subgroup of Nepal

Tsum
- Tsumke
- Region: Nepal
- Native speakers: (4,800 cited 2000 census)
- Language family: Sino-Tibetan: Tibeto-Kanauri ?; Bodish; Tibetic; Kyirong–Kagate; Tsum

Language codes
- ISO 639-3: ttz
- Glottolog: tsum1240
- ELP: Tsum

Tsum is a language from the subgroup of Tibetic languages spoken by the Tsum people primarily in the Tsum Valley of the Gorka District of Nepal. The language is also known as Tsumke.

== Speakers ==
There are over 4000 speakers of Tsum, known as Tsumpas. Many speakers of the language have migrated away from the Tsum valley, and now live in Kathmandu and abroad. Younger Tsumpas are more likely to be educated in Nepali and English, leading to attrition of the language.

== Relationship to other languages ==
There is a varying degree of mutual intelligibility between Tsum and other Kyirong-Yolmo varieties. It is most closely related to Nubri and Gyalsumdo, and more distantly related to other languages in the family.

== Sources ==
- Dhakal, Dubi Nanda & Mark Donohue. 2015. Inchoative/causative verb pairs in Tsum. Nepalese Linguistics 30. 45-49.
- Donohue, Mark & Dubi Nanda Dhakal. 2016. A Tsum Lexicon. (Languages of the World/Dictionaries, 61.) München: LINCOM. 197pp.
- Liu, Naijing. 2015. Tsum tone: a challenge for typology and phonological description. (MA thesis, Australian National University).
- Webster, Jeff. 1992. A Socio-linguistic Survey of the Tibeto-Burman Dialects of North Gorkha District, Nepal. Ms.
