= Kyirong language =

Tibetic language spoken in Tibet

Kyirong
- Lende; Kyerung
- स्युबा
- Region: Tibet
- Native speakers: 100 (2002)
- Language family: Sino-Tibetan: Tibeto-Kanauri ?; Bodish; Tibetic; Kyirong–Kagate; Kyirong

Language codes
- ISO 639-3: kgy
- Glottolog: kyer1238 Kyerung

Kyirong is a language from the subgroup of Tibetic languages spoken in the Gyirong County of the Shigatse prefecture, of the Tibetan Autonomous Region.

Kyirong has lexical tone, with a three-tone system.

== Relationship to other languages ==
There is a varying degree of mutual intelligibility between Kyirong and other Kyirong-Yolmo varieties. It is most closely related to the Nubri and Gyalsomdo languages, and more distantly related to other languages in the family.

== Phonology ==
=== Consonants ===
There are 36 consonants in Kyirong, which are summarized in the table below.

		Bilabial	Apico-Dental		Retroflex	Lamino- post-alveolar	Palatal	Velar	Glottal
Nasal		m	n				ɲ	ŋ	
Plosive/ Affricate	voiceless	p	t	ts	ʈ	tɕ	c	k	
Plosive/ Affricate	aspirated	pʰ	tʰ	tsʰ	ʈʰ	tɕʰ	cʰ	kʰ	
Plosive/ Affricate	voiced	b	d	dz	ɖ	dʑ	ɟ	ɡ	
Fricative	voiceless		s			ɕ			h
Fricative	voiced		z			ʑ			ɦ
Liquid	rhotic		r						
Liquid	voiced lateral		l						
Liquid	unvoiced lateral		ɬ						
Semivowel		w					j		

=== Vowels ===
There are eight places of articulation for vowels. There is a length distinction at each place of articulation, as well as a long nasalised vowel.

		Front		Central	Back
Close	oral	i iː	y yː		u uː
Close	nasal	ĩː	ỹː		ũː
Half-close	oral	e eː	ø øː		
Half-close	nasal	ẽː	ø̃ː		
Half-open	oral	ɛ ɛː			ɔ ɔː
Half-open	nasal	ɛ̃ː			ɔ̃ː
Open	oral			a aː	
Open	nasal			ãː	

=== Tone ===
Kyriong has a three tone system; high, medium and low. Low tone is often accompanied by breathy voice.

== Sources ==
- Hedlin, M. (2011). An Investigation of the relationship between the Kyirong, Yòlmo, and Standard Spoken Tibetan speech varieties. Masters thesis, Payap University, Chiang Mai.
- Huber, B. (2005). The Tibetan dialect of Lende (Kyirong). Beiträge zur tibetischen Erzählforschung, 15.
