= Burmese numerical classifiers =

Grammatical component

In Burmese, classifiers or measure words, in the form of particles, are used when counting or measuring nouns. They immediately follow the number, unless the number is a round number (ends in a zero), in which case, the measure word precedes the number. Nouns to which the classifiers refer to can be omitted if the context allows, because many classifiers have implicit meanings.

The only exceptions to this rule are measurements of time or age (minutes, hours, days, years, etc.), where a preceding noun is not required, as the time measurement acts as a measure word.

== Classifiers ==
See IPA/Burmese for an explanation of the phonetic symbols used in this section.

Burmese	IPA	Transliteration	Main usage
People and animals
ကောင်	[kàuɰ̃]	kaung	animals
ပါး	[pá]	pa	sacred persons (such as Buddhist monks and nuns)
ယောက်	[jauʔ]	yauk	persons (general classifier)
ရှဉ်း	[ʃíɰ̃]	shin	pairs of draught cattle
ဦး	[ʔú]	u	people, monks and nuns
Other measure words
ကုံး	[kóuɰ̃]	koun	garlands, necklaces, stringed items
ကျိုက်	[tɕaiʔ]	kyaik	draughts gulped down
ကျိပ်	[tɕeiʔ]	kyeik	items in 'tens'
ခါ	[kʰà]	kha	number of times
ခု	[kʰṵ]	khu	items (general classifier)
ခက်	[kʰɛʔ]	khet	branches, sprays of flowers
ခင်	[kʰìɰ̃]	khin	skeins of wool or cotton
ခေါင်း	[kʰáuɰ̃]	khaung	skeins of yarn
ခိုင်	[kʰàiɰ̃]	khaing	bunches of flowers, fruits
ခေါက်	[kʰauʔ]	khauk	trips
ခွေ	[kʰwè]	khway	rings, coils
ခွန်း	[kʰúɰ̃]	khun	words
ချီ	[tɕʰì]	chi	performances or shows
ချိုး	[dʑó]	cho	components of a ratio
ချက်	[tɕʰɛʔ]	chet	strokes, blows, hits, points strokes of clocks, drums, gongs, etc.
ချောင်း	[tɕʰáuɰ̃]	chaung	thin, long items (like pencils, sticks)
ချပ်	[tɕʰaʔ]	chat	flat items (like tables)
ခြည်	[tɕʰì]	chi	rings, bangles
စီး	[sí]	si	vehicles and transport animals
စည်း	[sí]	si	bundles
စင်း	[síɰ̃]	sin	long-shaped items (like arrows, boats, cars)
စောင်	[sàuɰ̃]	saung	literary pieces, documents, letters, etc.
စုံ	[sòuɰ̃]	soun	sets or pairs
ဆ	[sʰa̰]	hsa	number of times per equal amount
ဆူ	[sʰù]	hsu	sacred objects and parabaik (Pali manuscripts)
ဆောင်	[sʰàuɰ̃]	hsaung	buildings (like houses, monasteries and royal buildings)
ဆိုင်း	[sʰáiɰ̃]	hsaing	work shifts, work teams, packets of gold foil
တန်	[tàɰ̃]	tan	different legs of a journey, component parts of abstract concepts
တန့်	[ta̰ɰ̃]	tan	bars, stripes, etc.
တုတ်	[touʔ]	touk	carcasses of hares
တွဲ	[twɛ́]	twe	items in pairs, bunches or clusters
တွက်	[twɛʔ]	twet	snapping of fingers
ထပ်	[tʰaʔ]	htat	layers, strata, storeys of buildings, etc.
ထမ်း	[tʰáɰ̃]	htan	loads carried with a shoulder pole (yoke)
ထောက်	[tʰauʔ]	htauk	stages of a journey, width of a point or tip of something
ထည်	[tʰɛ̀]	hte	articles of clothing
ထုပ်	[tʰouʔ]	htout	packages
ထုံး	[tʰóuɰ̃]	htoun	knots, coils, etc.
ထွာ	[tʰwà]	htwa	number of hand spans
ထွေ	[tʰwè]	htwei	varied items; melds of playing cards
နပ်	[naʔ]	nat	meals
ပါး	[pá]	pa	sacred persons or objects (such as Buddhist monks)
ပေါ	[pɔ́]	paw	bundles of seedlings
ပေါက်	[pauʔ]	pauk	dots or drops
ပိုင်	[pàiɰ̃]	paing	monk's robe; piece of silk used as headdress
ပိုင်း	[páiɰ̃]	paing	part or division of something
ပတ်	[paʔ]	pat	weeks
ပင်	[pìɰ̃]	pin	tall upright things (trees, plants, poles, etc.); long strands (hair, thread, etc.).
ပိုဒ်	[paiʔ]	paik	paragraphs
ပုဒ်	[pouʔ]	poud	pieces of writing (such as articles, verse, songs, etc.)
ပုံ	[pòuɰ̃]	poun	piles of material
ပျစ်	[pjiʔ]	pyit	mats of palm thatching
ပြူး	[pjú]	pyu	items in twos or pairs.
ပြိုက်	[pjaiʔ]	pyaik	frequency of rain and snow
ပြင်	[pjìɰ̃]	pyin	doctrines, concepts, dictums, etc.
ပြာ	[pjàɰ̃]	pyan	number of times
ပွဲ	[pwɛ́]	pwe	dishes; offertories
ဖီး	[pʰí]	hpi	hands of bananas or plantains
ဖောင်	[pʰàuɰ̃]	hpaung	height or depth equal to the height of a person standing with upraised hands (i.e. from the soles of his feet to the tips of his upraised hands)
ဖုံ	[pʰòuɰ̃]	hpoun	things in heaps, batches or packs
ဖန်	[pʰàɰ̃]	hpan	denotes frequency
ဖြာ	[pʰjà]	hpya	denotes variety, diversity
ဖွာ	[pʰwà]	hpwa	number of puffs (from cigarettes, etc.)
မည်	[mjì]	myi	ingredients of a drug; kinds of dishes served
မြူ	[mjù]	myu	pots of toddy wine
မျက်	[mjeʔ]	myet	bundles of loops in a skein of cotton
မှုတ်	[m̥ouʔ]	hmout	number of scoops with a dipper or ladle
မြွှာ	[m̥wà]	hmwa	segments of fruit (such as cloves of garlic); parts of a multiparous birth (such as twins)
မြှောင့်	[m̥ja̰uɰ̃]	hmyaung	longitudinally divided segments (such as cloves of garlic)
ယာ	[jà]	ya	betel quids
ယှက်	[ʃɛʔ]	shek	thin slices of food (such as pancake, waffle, etc.)
ရန်	[jàɰ̃]	yan	objects in pairs
ရပ်	[jaʔ]	yat	itemisation; expressing things in terms of a man's height
ရေး	[jé]	yei	periods of sleep
ရေစီး	[jè zí]	yei zi	leaves in a parabaik (Pali manuscripts)
ရိုက်	[jaiʔ]	yaik	lengths measured with a bamboo pole
ရစ်	[jiʔ]	yit	instalments, stages, chevrons, stripes, etc.
ရွက်	[jwɛʔ]	ywet	counting sheets
လား	[lá]	la	races in a contest consisting of a series of cart or boat races
လီ	[lì]	li	multiples, frequencies
လေး	[lé]	lei	used in connection with multiples or in replicate, parts of a ratio
လော	[lɔ́]	law	number of times
လက်	[lɛʔ]	lek	elongated items; turns in the game of dice
လုတ်	[louʔ]	lout	mouthfuls of food
လုံး	[lóuɰ̃]	loun	round, globular items
လှိုင်း	[l̥áiɰ̃]	hlaing	sheaves of paddy
လွှာ	[l̥wà]	hlwa	layers, strata, etc.
ဝါး	[wá]	wa	handsbreadth
သား	[θá]	tha	number of ticals or fractions of a tical or viss
သုတ်	[θouʔ]	thouk	movements in groups or operations in shifts
သွယ်	[θwɛ̀]	thwe	long, sinuous things (such as strands of pearls, garlands of flowers); paths, ways, methods, means, etc.

== See also ==
- Burmese units of measurement
- Burmese language
- Burmese numerals
- Measure word
