= Lhasa Tibetan =

Standardized dialect of Tibetan

- བོད་སྐད་།
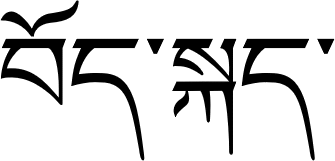
- Native to: Lhasa
- Region: Tibet Autonomous Region, Ü-Tsang
- Native speakers: (1.2 million cited 1990 census)
- Language family: Sino-Tibetan: Tibeto-Burman; Tibeto-Kanauri (?); Bodish; Tibetic; Central Tibetan; Lhasa Tibetan
- Early forms: Old Tibetan: Classical Tibetan
- Writing system: Tibetan script; Tibetan Braille

Official status
- Official language in: China: Tibet Autonomous Region
- Regulated by: Committee for the Standardisation of the Tibetan Language (Note: Tibetan: བོད་ཡིག་བརྡ་ཚད་ལྡན་དུ་སྒྱུར་བའི་ལས་དོན་ཨུ་ཡོན་ལྷན་ཁང་གིས་བསྒྲིགས།, Wylie: bod yig brda tshad ldan du sgyur ba'i las don u yon lhan khang gis bsgrigs; Chinese: 藏语术语标准化工作委员会)

Language codes
- ISO 639-1: bo
- ISO 639-2: tib (B) bod (T)
- ISO 639-3: bod
- Glottolog: tibe1272
- Linguasphere: 70-AAA-ac
- Map of areas where Standard Tibetan is spoken

Lhasa Tibetan (Note: The name "Lhasa Tibetan" is the preferred name, as in Chapter 19: Lhasa Tibetan, The Sino-Tibetan Languages, 2nd edition (2017), edited by Graham Thurgood and Randy J. LaPolla.) (Note: Tibetan: ལྷ་སའི་སྐད།, Wylie: Lha-sa'i skad, THL: Lhaséké, ZWPY: Lasägä) or Standard Tibetan (Note: Tibetan: བོད་སྐད།, Wylie: Bod skad, THL: Böké, ZWPY: Pögä, IPA: [pʰø̀k˭ɛʔ], or Tibetan: བོད་ཡིག།, Wylie: Bod yig, THL: Böyik, ZWPY: Pöyig) is a standardized dialect of Tibetan spoken by the people of Lhasa, the capital of the Tibetan Autonomous Region. It is an official language of the Tibet Autonomous Region.

In the traditional "three-branched" classification of the Tibetic languages, the Lhasa dialect belongs to the Central Tibetan branch (the other two being Khams Tibetan and Amdo Tibetan). In terms of mutual intelligibility, speakers of Khams Tibetan are able to communicate at a basic level with Lhasa Tibetan, while Amdo speakers cannot. Both Lhasa Tibetan and Khams Tibetan evolved to become tonal and do not preserve the word-initial consonant clusters, which makes them very far from Classical Tibetan, especially when compared to the more conservative Amdo Tibetan.

== Registers ==
Like many languages, Lhasa Tibetan has a variety of language registers:

- ཕལ་སྐད། (Wylie: phal skad, literally "demotic language"): the vernacular speech.
- ཞེ་ས། (Wylie: zhe sa, "honorifics or deference, courtesy"): the formal spoken style, particularly prominent in Lhasa.
- ཡིག་སྐད། (Wylie: yig skad, literally "letters language" or "literary language"): the written literary style; may include ཆོས་སྐད chos skad below.
- ཆོས་སྐད། (Wylie: chos skad, literally "doctrine language" or "religious language"): the literary style in which the scriptures and other classical works are written.

== Grammar ==
=== Syntax and word order ===
Tibetan is an ergative language, with what can loosely be termed subject–object–verb (SOV) word order. Grammatical constituents broadly have head-final word order:

- adjectives generally follow nouns in Tibetan, unless the two are linked by a genitive particle
- objects and adverbs precede the verb, as do adjectives in copular clauses
- a noun marked with the genitive case precedes the noun which it modifies
- demonstratives and numerals follow the noun they modify.

=== Nouns and pronouns ===
Tibetan nouns do not possess grammatical gender, although this may be marked lexically, nor do they inflect for number. However, definite human nouns may take a plural marker ཚོ tsho.

Tibetan has been described as having six cases: absolutive, agentive, genitive, ablative, associative and oblique. These are generally marked by particles, which are attached to entire noun phrases, rather than individual nouns. These suffixes may vary in form based on the final sound of the root.

Personal pronouns are inflected for number, showing singular, dual and plural forms. They can have between one and three registers.

The Standard Tibetan language distinguishes three levels of demonstrative: proximal འདི 'di "this", medial དེ de "that", and distal ཕ་གི pha-gi "that over there (yonder)". These can also take case suffixes.

=== Verbs ===
Verbs in Tibetan always come at the end of the clause. Verbs do not show agreement in person, number or gender in Tibetan. There is also no voice distinction between active and passive; Tibetan verbs are neutral with regard to voice.

Tibetan verbs can be divided into classes based on volition and valency. The volition of the verb has a major effect on its morphology and syntax. Volitional verbs have imperative forms, whilst non-volitional verbs do not: compare ལྟོས་ཤིག། ltos shig "Look!" with the non-existent *མཐོང་ཤིག། mthong shig "*See!". Additionally, only volitional verbs can take the egophoric copula ཡིན། yin.

Verbs in Tibetan can be split into monovalent and divalent verbs; some may also act as both, such as ཆག chag "break". This interacts with the volition of the verb to condition which nouns take the ergative case and which must take the absolutive, remaining unmarked. Nonetheless, distinction in transitivity is orthogonal to volition; both the volitional and non-volitional classes contain transitive as well as intransitive verbs.

The aspect of the verb affects which verbal suffixes and which final auxiliary copulae are attached. Morphologically, verbs in the unaccomplished aspect are marked by the suffix གི gi or its other forms, identical to the genitive case for nouns, whereas accomplished aspect verbs do not use this suffix. Each can be broken down into two subcategories: under the unaccomplished aspect, future and progressive/general; under the accomplished aspect, perfect and aorist or simple perfective.

Evidentiality is a well-known feature of Tibetan verb morphology, gaining much scholarly attention, and contributing substantially to the understanding of evidentiality across languages. The evidentials in Standard Tibetan interact with aspect in a system marked by final copulae, with the following resultant modalities being a feature of Standard Tibetan, as classified by Nicolas Tournadre:

- Assertive
- Allocentric intentional egophoric
- Allocentric intentional egophoric/Imminent danger
- Experiential egophoric
- Habitual/Generic assertive
- Inferential
- Intentional egophoric
- Intentional/Habitual egophoric
- Receptive egophoric
- Testimonial

== Numerals ==
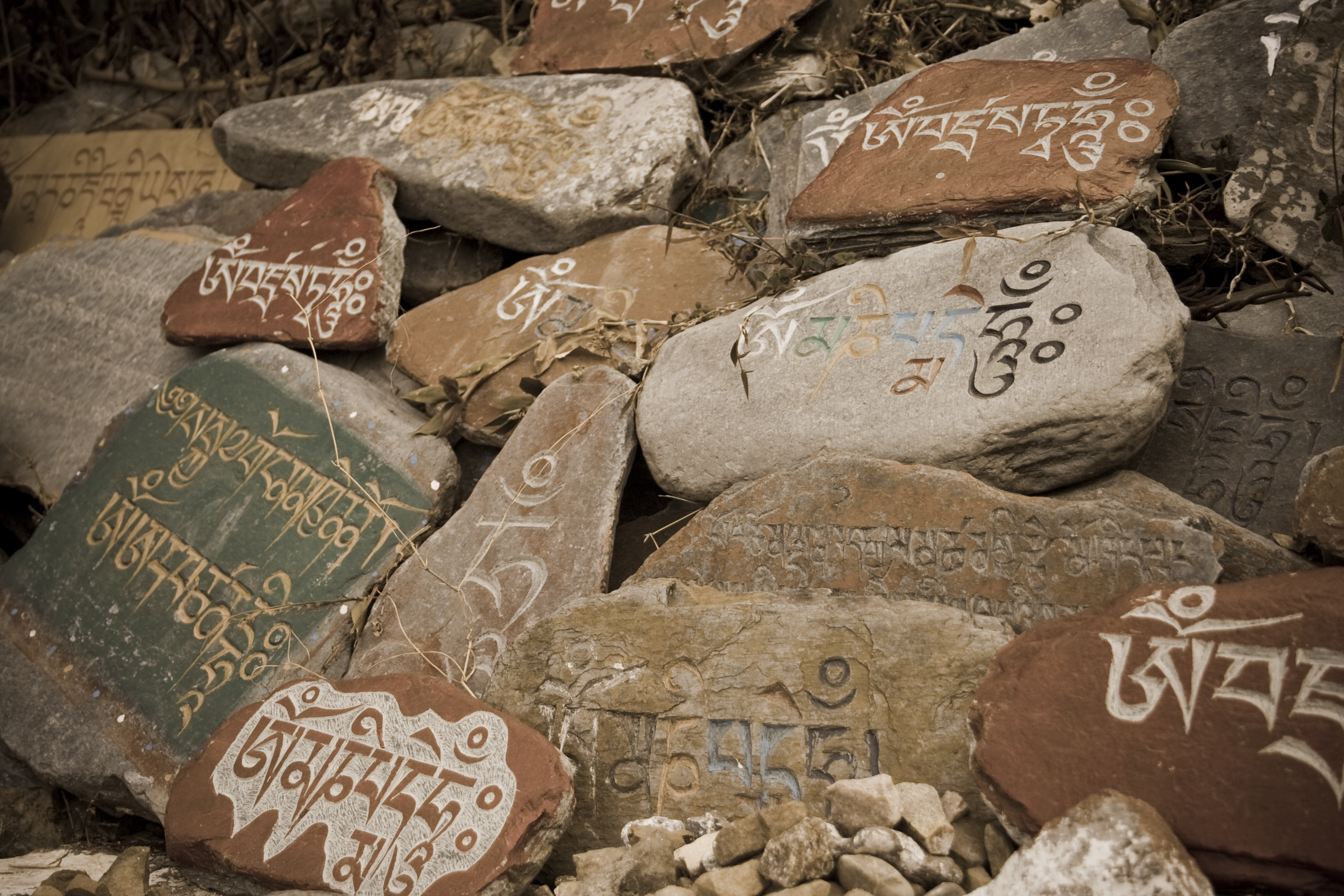
Stone tablets with prayers in Tibetan at a temple in McLeod Ganj

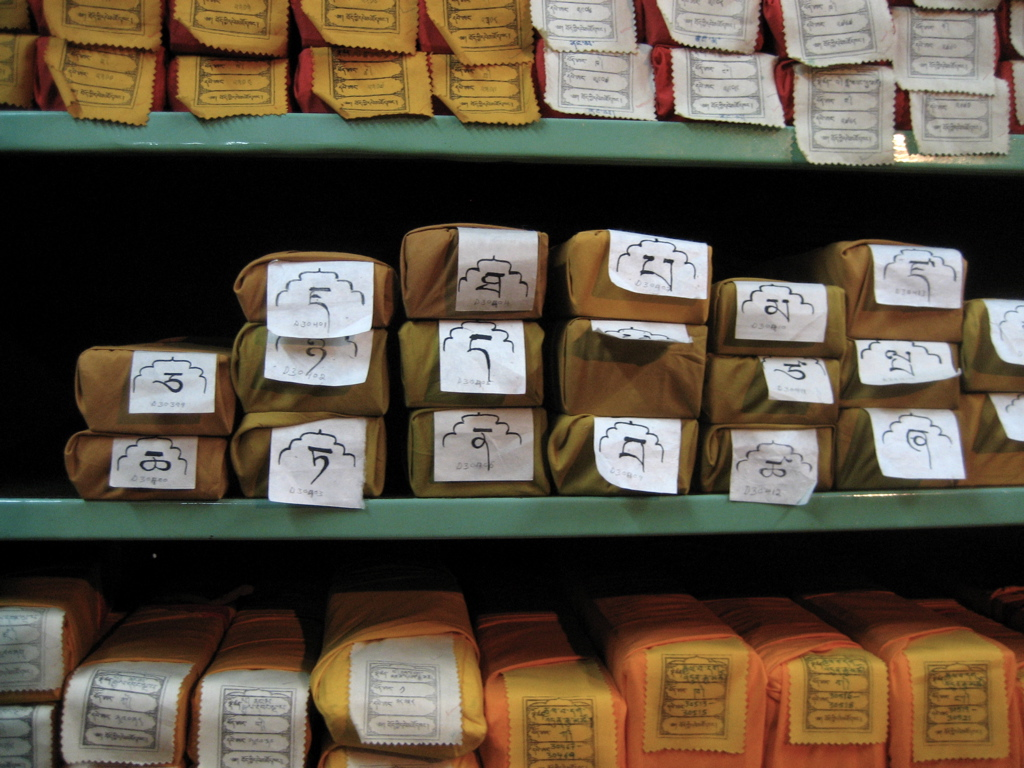
Pechas, scriptures of Tibetan Buddhism, at a library in Dharamsala, India

Unlike many other languages of East Asia such as Burmese, Chinese, Japanese, Korean and Vietnamese, there are no numeral auxiliaries or measure words used in counting in Tibetan. However, words expressive of a collective or integral are often used after the tens, sometimes after a smaller number.

In scientific and astrological works, the numerals, as in Vedic Sanskrit, are expressed by symbolical words.

The written numerals are a variant of the Hindu–Arabic numeral system, forming a base-10 positional counting system that is attested early on in Classical Tibetan texts.

Tibetan Numerals	༠	༡	༢	༣	༤	༥	༦	༧	༨	༩
Devanagari numerals	०	१	२	३	४	५	६	७	८	९
Bengali numerals	০	১	২	৩	৪	৫	৬	৭	৮	৯
Arabic numerals	0	1	2	3	4	5	6	7	8	9

Tibetan makes use of a special connector particle for the units above each multiple of ten. Between 100 and 199, the connective དང dang, literally "and", is used after the hundred portion. Above ས་ཡ saya million, the numbers are treated as nouns and thus have their multiples following the word.

The numbers 1, 2, 3 and 10 change spelling when combined with other numerals, reflecting a change in pronunciation in combination.

Written Tibetan	Wylie transliteration	Arabic numerals	Written Tibetan	Wylie transliteration	Arabic numerals	Written Tibetan	Wylie transliteration	Arabic numerals
གཅིག	gcig	1	ཉི་ཤུ་རྩ་གཅིག	nyi shu tsa gcig	21	བཞི་བརྒྱ	bzhi bgya	400
གཉིས	gnyis	2	ཉི་ཤུ་རྩ་གཉིས	nyi shu rtsa gnyis	22	ལྔ་བརྒྱ	lnga bgya	500
གསུམ	gsum	3	ཉི་ཤུ་རྩ་གསུམ	nyi shu rtsa gsum	23	དྲུག་བརྒྱ	drug bgya	600
བཞི	bzhi	4	ཉི་ཤུ་རྩ་བཞི	nyi shu rtsa bzhi	24	བདུན་བརྒྱ	bdun bgya	700
ལྔ	lnga	5	ཉི་ཤུ་རྩ་ལྔ	nyi shu rtsa lnga	25	བརྒྱད་བརྒྱ	brgyad bgya	800
དྲུག	drug	6	ཉི་ཤུ་རྩ་དྲུག	nyi shu rtsa drug	26	དགུ་བརྒྱ	dgu bgya	900
བདུན	bdun	7	ཉི་ཤུ་རྩ་བདུན	nyi shu rtsa bdun	27	ཆིག་སྟོང	chig stong	1000
བརྒྱད	brgyad	8	ཉི་ཤུ་རྩ་བརྒྱད	nyi shu rtsa brgyad	28	ཁྲི	khri	(a unit of) 10,000
དགུ	dgu	9	ཉི་ཤུ་རྩ་དགུ	nyi shu rtsa dgu	29			
བཅུ	bcu	10	སུམ་ཅུ	sum cu	30	སུམ་ཅུ་སོ་གཅིག	sum cu so gcig	31
བཅུ་གཅིག	bcu gcig	11	བཞི་བཅུ	bzhi bcu	40	བཞི་བཅུ་ཞེ་གཅིག	bzhi bcu zhe gcig	41
བཅུ་གཉིས	bcu gnyis	12	ལྔ་བཅུ	lnga bcu	50	ལྔ་བཅུ་ང་གཅིག	lnga bcu nga gcig	51
བཅུ་གསུམ	bcu gsum	13	དྲུག་ཅུ	drug cu	60	དྲུག་ཅུ་རེ་གཅིག	drug cu re gcig	61
བཅུ་བཞི	bcu bzhi	14	བདུན་ཅུ	bdun cu	70	བདུན་ཅུ་དོན་གཅིག	bdun cu don gcig	71
བཅོ་ལྔ	bco lnga	15	བརྒྱད་ཅུ	brgyad cu	80	བརྒྱད་ཅུ་གྱ་གཅིག	brgyad cu gya gcig	81
བཅུ་དྲུག	bcu drug	16	དགུ་བཅུ	dgu bcu	90	དགུ་བཅུ་གོ་གཅིག	dgu bcu go gcig	91
བཅུ་བདུན	bcu bdun	17	བརྒྱ	bgya	100	བརྒྱ་དང་གཅིག	bgya dang gcig	101
བཅོ་བརྒྱད	bco brgyad	18	བརྒྱ་དང་ལྔ་བཅུ	bgya dang lnga bcu	150			
བཅུ་དགུ	bcu dgu	19	ཉིས་བརྒྱ	nyis bgya	200			
ཉི་ཤུ	nyi shu	20	སུམ་བརྒྱ	sum bgya	300			
						འབུམ	'bum	(a unit of) 100,000
						ས་ཡ	sa ya	(a unit of) 1,000,000 (1 Million)
						བྱེ་བ	bye ba	(a unit of) 10,000,000
						དུང་ཕྱུར	dung phyur	(a unit of) 100,000,000
						ཐེར་འབུམ	ther 'bum	(a unit of) 1,000,000,000 (1 Billion)

Ordinal numbers are formed by adding a suffix to the cardinal number, པ (-pa), with the exception of the ordinal number "first", which has its own lexeme, དང་པོ (dang po).

== Writing system ==
Tibetan is written with an Indic script, with a historically conservative orthography that reflects Old Tibetan phonology and helps unify the Tibetan-language area. It is also helpful in reconstructing Proto-Sino-Tibetan and Old Chinese.

Wylie transliteration is the most common system of romanization used by Western scholars in rendering written Tibetan using the Latin alphabet (such as employed on much of this page), while linguists tend to use other special transliteration systems of their own. As for transcriptions meant to approximate the pronunciation, Tibetan pinyin is the official romanization system employed by the government of the People's Republic of China, while English language materials use the THL transcription system. Certain names may also retain irregular transcriptions, such as Chomolungma for Mount Everest.

Tibetan orthographic syllable structure is (C_{1}C_{2})C_{3}(C_{4})V(C_{5}C_{6}) Not all combinations are licit.

position	C_{1}	C_{2}	C_{3}	C_{4}	V	C_{5}	C_{6}
name	Prefix	Superfix	Root	Subjoined	Vowel	Suffix	Suffix 2
licit letters	ག ད བ མ འ	ར ལ ས	any consonant	ཡ ར ལ ཝ	any vowel	ག ང ད ན བ མ འ ར ལ ས	ད ས

== Phonology ==
The following summarizes the sound system of the dialect of Tibetan spoken in Lhasa, the most influential variety of the spoken language.

The structure of a Lhasa Tibetan syllable is relatively simple; no consonant cluster is allowed and codas are only allowed with a single consonant. Vowels can be either short or long, and long vowels may further be nasalized. Vowel harmony is observed in two syllable words as well as verbs with a finite ending.

Also, tones are contrastive in this language, where at least two tonemes are distinguished. Although the four-tone analysis is favored by linguists in China, DeLancey (2003) suggests that the falling tone and the final [k] or [ʔ] are in contrastive distribution, describing Lhasa Tibetan syllables as either high or low.

=== Consonants ===
Consonant phonemes of Standard Tibetan
	Bilabial		Alveolar		Retroflex	(Alveolo-) Palatal		Velar		Glottal
Nasal	m		n			ɲ		ŋ		
Stop	pʰ	p	tʰ	t	ʈʰ ~ ʈʂʰ ʈ ~ ʈʂ	cʰ	c	kʰ	k	ʔ
Affricate			tsʰ	ts	ʈʰ ~ ʈʂʰ ʈ ~ ʈʂ	tɕʰ	tɕ			
Fricative			s		ʂ	ɕ				h
Approximant	w		ɹ			j				
Lateral			l̥	l						

1. In the low tone, the unaspirated /p, t, ts, ʈ ~ ʈʂ, tɕ, c, k/ are voiced [b, d, dz, ɖ ~ ɖʐ, dʑ, ɟ, ɡ], whereas the aspirated stops and affricates /pʰ, tʰ, tsʰ, ʈʰ ~ ʈʂʰ, tɕ, cʰ, kʰ/ lose some of their aspiration. Thus, in this context, the main distinction between /p, t, ts, ʈ ~ ʈʂ, tɕ, c, k/ and /pʰ, tʰ, tsʰ, ʈʰ ~ ʈʂʰ, tɕʰ, cʰ, kʰ/ is voicing. The dialect of the upper social strata in Lhasa does not use voiced stops and affricates in the low tone.
2. The approximant /ɹ/ has four realizations [ɹ], [ʐ], [ɾ] and [r]. Some previous work postulates a voiceless approximant like [ɹ̥] (Dawson, 1980b; Sprigg, 1954; Tournadre & Dorje, 2003). In the current dataset, there is no clear evidence for this sound. It might be a variant of the sound /ʂ/ in certain varieties of Lhasa or Central Tibetan.
3. The consonants /m/, /ŋ/, /p/, /r/, /l/, and /k/ may appear in syllable-final positions. The Classical Tibetan final /n/ is still present, but its modern pronunciation is normally realized as a nasalisation of the preceding vowel, rather than as a discrete consonant (see above). However, /k/ is not pronounced in the final position of a word except in very formal speech. Also, syllable-final /r/ and /l/ are often not clearly pronounced but realized as a lengthening of the preceding vowel. The phonemic glottal stop /ʔ/ appears only at the end of words in the place of /s/, /t/, or /k/, which were pronounced in Classical Tibetan but have since been elided. For instance, the word for Tibet itself was Bod in Classical Tibetan but is now pronounced [pʰø̀ʔ] in the Lhasa dialect.

=== Vowels ===
The vowels of Lhasa Tibetan have been characterized and described in several different ways, and it continues to be a topic of ongoing research.

Tournadre and Sangda Dorje describe eight vowels in the standard language:

Vowel phonemes of Standard Tibetan
	Front	Central	Back
Close	i y		u
Close-mid	e ø		o
Open-mid	ɛ		
Open		a	

Three additional vowels are sometimes described as significantly distinct: [ʌ] or [ə], which is normally an allophone of /a/; [ɔ], which is normally an allophone of /o/; and [ɛ̈] (an unrounded, centralised, mid front vowel), which is normally an allophone of /e/. These sounds normally occur in closed syllables; because Tibetan does not allow geminated consonants, there are cases in which one syllable ends with the same sound as the one following it. The result is that the first is pronounced as an open syllable but retains the vowel typical of a closed syllable. For instance, ཞབས zhabs (foot) is pronounced [ɕʌp] and པད pad (borrowing from Sanskrit padma, lotus) is pronounced [pɛʔ], but the compound word, ཞབས་པད zhabs pad (lotus-foot, government minister) is pronounced [ɕʌpɛʔ]. This process can result in minimal pairs involving sounds that are otherwise allophones.

Sources vary on whether the [ɛ̈] phone (resulting from /e/ in a closed syllable) and the [ɛ] phone (resulting from /a/ through the i-mutation) are distinct or basically identical.

Phonemic vowel length exists in Lhasa Tibetan but in a restricted set of circumstances. Assimilation of Classical Tibetan's suffixes, normally 'i (འི་), at the end of a word produces a long vowel in Lhasa Tibetan; the feature is sometimes omitted in phonetic transcriptions. In normal spoken pronunciation, a lengthening of the vowel is also frequently substituted for the sounds [r] and [l] when they occur at the end of a syllable.

The vowels /i/, /y/, /e/, /ø/, and /ɛ/ each have nasalized forms: /ĩ/, /ỹ/, /ẽ/, /ø̃/, and /ɛ̃/, respectively. These historically result from /in/, /un/, /en/, /on/, /an/, and are reflected in the written language. The vowel quality of /un/, /on/ and /an/ has shifted, since historical /n/, along with all other coronal final consonants, caused a form of umlaut in the Ü/Dbus branch of Central Tibetan. In some unusual cases, the vowels /a/, /u/, and /o/ may also be nasalised.

=== Vowel harmony ===
Lhasa Tibetan employs vowel harmony based on vowel height. Vowel harmony can be both progressive and regressive and applies to compounds, affixes and enclitics.

High	i	y	u	ə
Non-high	e/ɛ	ø	o	a

Example of regressive harmony: བོད [pʰøː] + ལུག [luː] = བོད་ལུག [pʰyːluː] ("Tibetan sheep").

Example of progressive harmony: དབྱིན [ʔĩ] + བོད [pʰøː] = དབྱིན་བོད [ʔibyː] ("Anglo-Tibetan").

=== Tones ===
The Lhasa dialect is usually described as having two tones: high and low. However, in monosyllabic words, each tone can occur with two distinct contours. The high tone can be pronounced with either a flat or a falling contour, and the low tone can be pronounced with either a flat or rising-falling contour, the latter being a tone that rises to a medium level before falling again. It is normally safe to distinguish only between the two tones because there are very few minimal pairs that differ only because of contour. The difference occurs only in certain words ending in the sounds [m] or [ŋ]; for instance, the word kham (Tibetan: ཁམ་, "piece") is pronounced [kʰám] with a high flat tone, whereas the word Khams (Tibetan: ཁམས་, "the Kham region") is pronounced [kʰâm] with a high falling tone.

In polysyllabic words, tone mainly distinguishes meaning in the first syllable. This means that from the point of view of phonological typology, Tibetan could more accurately be described as a pitch-accent language than a true tone language, in the latter of which all syllables in a word can carry their own tone.

== Verbal system ==
The Lhasa Tibetan verbal system distinguishes four tenses and three evidential moods.

	Future	Present	Past	Perfect
Personal	V་གི་ཡིན་ V-gi-yin	V་གི་ཡོད་ V-gi-yod	V་པ་ཡིན / V་བྱུང་ V-pa-yin / byung	V་ཡོད་ V-yod
Factual	V་གི་རེད་ V-gi-red	V་གི་ཡོད་པ་རེད་ V-gi-yod-pa-red	V་པ་རེད་ V-pa-red	V་ཡོད་པ་རེད་ V-yod-pa-red
Testimonial	-------	V་གི་འདུག་ V-gi-'dug	V་སོང་ V-song	V་བཞག་ V-bzhag

The three moods may all occur with all three grammatical persons, though early descriptions associated the personal modal category with European first-person agreement.

== Scholarship ==
In the 18th and 19th centuries several Western linguists arrived in Tibet:

- The Capuchin friars who settled in Lhasa for a quarter of century from 1719:
  - Francesco della Penna, well known from his accurate description of Tibet.
  - Cassian di Macerata sent home materials which were used by the Augustine friar Aug. Antonio Georgi of Rimini (1711–1797) in his Alphabetum Tibetanum (Rome, 1762, 4t0), a ponderous and confused compilation, which may be still referred to, but with great caution.
- The Hungarian Sándor Kőrösi Csoma (1784–1842), who published the first Tibetan–European language dictionary (Classical Tibetan and English in this case) and grammar, Essay Towards a Dictionary, Tibetan and English.
- Heinrich August Jäschke of the Moravian mission which was established in Ladakh in 1857, Tibetan Grammar and A Tibetan–English Dictionary.
- At St Petersburg, Isaac Jacob Schmidt published his Grammatik der tibetischen Sprache in 1839 and his Tibetisch-deutsches Wörterbuch in 1841. His access to Mongolian sources had enabled him to enrich the results of his labours with a certain amount of information unknown to his predecessors. His Tibetische Studien (1851–1868) is a valuable collection of documents and observations.
- In France, P. E. Foucaux published in 1847 a translation from the Rgya tcher rol-pa, the Tibetan version of the Lalita Vistara, and in 1858 a Grammaire thibétaine.
- Ant. Schiefner of St. Petersburg in 1849 his series of translations and researches.
- Theos Casimir Bernard, a PhD scholar of religion from Columbia University, explorer and practitioner of Yoga and Tibetan Buddhism, published, after his 1936/37 trip to India and Tibet, A Simplified Grammar of the Literary Tibetan Language, 1946. See the 'Books' section.

Indian Indologist and linguist Rahul Sankrityayan wrote a Tibetan grammar in Hindi. Some of his other works on Tibetan were:

1. Tibbati Bal-Siksha, 1933
2. Pathavali (Vols. 1, 2, 3), 1933
3. Tibbati Vyakaran, 1933
4. Tibbat May Budh Dharm, 1948

Japanese linguist Kitamura Hajime published a grammar and dictionary of Lhasa Tibetan in 1990.

== Contemporary usage ==
In much of Tibet, primary education is conducted either primarily or entirely in the Tibetan language, and bilingual education is rarely introduced before students reach middle school. However, Chinese is the language of instruction of most Tibetan secondary schools. In April 2020, classroom instruction was switched from Tibetan to Mandarin Chinese in Ngaba, Sichuan. Students who continue on to tertiary education have the option of studying humanistic disciplines in Tibetan at a number of minority colleges in China. This contrasts with Tibetan schools in Dharamsala, India, where the Ministry of Human Resource Development curriculum requires academic subjects to be taught in English from middle school.

In February 2008, Norman Baker, a British Member of Parliament, released a statement to mark International Mother Language Day claiming, "The Chinese government are following a deliberate policy of extinguishing all that is Tibetan, including their own language in their own country" and he asserted a right for Tibetans to express themselves "in their mother tongue". However, Tibetologist Elliot Sperling has noted that "within certain limits the PRC does make efforts to accommodate Tibetan cultural expression" and "the cultural activity taking place all over the Tibetan plateau cannot be ignored."

Some scholars also question such claims because most Tibetans continue to reside in rural areas where Chinese is rarely spoken, as opposed to Lhasa and other Tibetan cities where Chinese can often be heard. In the Texas Journal of International Law, Barry Sautman stated that "none of the many recent studies of endangered languages deems Tibetan to be imperiled, and language maintenance among Tibetans contrasts with language loss even in the remote areas of Western states renowned for liberal policies... claims that primary schools in Tibet teach Mandarin are in error. Tibetan was the main language of instruction in 98% of TAR primary schools in 1996; today, Mandarin is introduced in early grades only in urban schools.... Because less than four out of ten TAR Tibetans reach secondary school, primary school matters most for their cultural formation."

== Example text ==
From Article 1 of the Universal Declaration of Human Rights in Tibetan, written in the Tibetan script:

འགྲོ་ བ་ མིའི་ རིགས་ རྒྱུད་ ཡོངས་ ལ་ སྐྱེས་ ཙམ་ ཉིད་ ནས་ ཆེ་ མཐོངས་ དང༌། ཐོབ་ ཐང་ གི་ རང་ དབང་ འདྲ་ མཉམ་ དུ་ ཡོད་ ལ། ཁོང་ ཚོར་ རང་ བྱུང་ གི་ བློ་ རྩལ་ དང་ བསམ་ ཚུལ་ བཟང་ པོ་ འདོན་ པའི་ འོས་ བབས་ ཀྱང་ ཡོད། དེ་ བཞིན་ ཕན་ ཚུན་ གཅིག་ གིས་ གཅིག་ ལ་ བུ་ སྤུན་ གྱི་ འདུ་ ཤེས་ འཛིན་ པའི་ བྱ་ སྤྱོད་ ཀྱང་ ལག་ ལེན་ བསྟར་ དགོས་ པ་ ཡིན།
'gro ba mi'i rigs rgyud yongs la skyes tsam nyid nas che mthongs dang thob thang gi rang dbang 'dra mnyam du yod la khong tshor rang byung gi blo rtsal dang bsam tshul bzang po 'don pa'i 'os babs kyang yod de bzhin phan tshun gcig gis gcig la bu spun gyi 'du shes 'dzin pa'i bya spyod kyang lag len bstar dgos pa yin
All human beings are born free and equal in dignity and rights. They are endowed with reason and conscience and should act towards one another in a spirit of brotherhood.

== See also ==
- Central Tibetan
- Amdo Tibetan
- Khams Tibetan
- Languages of Bhutan
- Sound correspondences between Tibetic languages
