= Sound correspondences between Tibetic languages =

Tibetic languages have high levels of dialectal variation; speakers of Lhasa Tibetan and Khams Tibetan cannot typically understand speakers of Amdo Tibetan varieties. Descending from Old Tibetan, there are 50 recognized Tibetic languages, which branch into more than 200 dialects, which can be grouped into eight dialect continua. This article discusses sound correspondences between Old Tibetan and four modern Tibetic languages.

== Phonological history of Tibetic languages ==
Tibetic languages belong to the Tibeto-Burman branch of the Sino-Tibetan language family. All Tibetic languages descend from Old Tibetan, much as all Romance languages descend from Classical Latin.

Old Tibetan, like Proto-Tibeto-Burman and Proto-Sino-Tibetan, did not contain tone and used agglutinative morphology primarily consisting of single consonant affixes. Several Tibetic languages, such as Lhasa Tibetan and Khams Tibetan, joined the Mainland Southeast Asia linguistic area. In these languages, the affixes underwent complete loss or fossilization.

== Onsets ==
This table shows onset sound correspondences between different Tibetic languages. These rules are near-universally applicable, but differ in a few contexts; see Additional sound correspondences for more information.

Tibetan Script	Wylie Transliteration	Old Tibetan	Lhasa Tibetan	Khams Tibetan	Settled Amdo Tibetan	Nomadic Amdo Tibetan
པ	p	p	pH	p1	p	
སྤ	sp	sp	pH	p1	p	pʰ
དཔ	dp	dp	pH	p1	hʷ	pʰ
ལྤ	lp	lp	pH	p1	p	pʰ
རྦ	rb	rb	pL	pʰ3	hb	
སྦ	sb	sb	pL	p3	b	
སྦྲ	sbr	sbr	pL	ʈ͡ʂ3	ʈ͡ʂ	
ལྦ	lb	lb	pL	b3	b	
འབ	'b	ᵐb	pL	b3	ᵐb	
ཕ	ph	pʰ	pʰH	pʰ2	pʰ	
འཕ	'ph	ᵐpʰ	pʰH	pʰ2	ᵐpʰ	
བ	b	b	pʰL	pʰ	w	
རྨ	rm	rm	mH	m1	hm	
དམ	dm	dm	mH	m1	hm	
སྨ	sm	sm	mH	m1	m	mʰ
སྨྲ	smr	smr	mH	m1	m	mʰ
མ	m	m	mL	m4	m	
མྲ	mr	mr	mL	m4	m	
ཝ	w	w	wL	w4	ʀʷ	
དབ	db	db	wL	ʔ1, w3	ʀ	
ཏ	t	t	tH	t1	t	
ལྟ	lt	lt	tH	t1	t	
རྟ	rt	rt	tH	t1	ht	
སྟ	st	st	tH	t1	t	tʰ
ཏྭ	tw	tʷ	tH	t1	tʷ	
གཏ	gt	gt	tH	t1	ht	ht
བཏ	bt	bt	tH	t1	ht	vt
བརྟ	brt	brt	tH	t1	ht	vht
བལྟ	blt	blt	tH	t1	ht	vht
བསྟ	bst	bst	tH	t1	ht	vtʰ
བལྡ	bld	bld	tH	d3	hd	vd
ལཐ	lth	ltʰ	tH	d2	htʰ	
སྡ	sd	sd	tL	t3	d	
ཟླ	zl	zl	tL	l3	d	
ལྡ	ld	ld	tL	d3	d	
མད	md	md	tL	d3	hd	
རྡ	rd	rd	tL	t3	hd	
གད	gd	gd	tL	t3	hd	
བད	bd	bd	tL	t3	hd	vd
བསྡ	bsd	bsd	tL	t3	hd	vd
བརྡ	brd	brd	tL	t3	hd	vd
བཟླ	bzl	bzl	tL	l3	hd	vsl
འད	'd	ⁿd	tL	d3	ⁿd	
ཐ	th	tʰ	tʰH	tʰ2	tʰ	
མཐ	mth	mtʰ	tʰH	d2	htʰ	
འཐ	'th	ⁿtʰ	tʰH	d2	ⁿtʰ	
ད	d	d	tʰL	tʰ3	t	
དྭ	dw	dʷ	tʰL	tʰ3	t	
རྣ	rn	rn	nH	n1	hr	
གན	gn	gn	nH	n1	hr	
བརྣ	brn	brn	nH	n1	hr	vr
སྣ	sn	sn	nH	n1	n	nʰ
བསྣ	bsn	bsn	nH	n1	h	vnʰ
མན	mn	mn	nH	n1	hn	hn
ན	n	n	nL	n4	n	
ཀླ	kl	kl	lH	l1	l	
གླ	gl	gl	lH	l1	l	
བླ	bl	bl	lH	l1	l	
རླ	rl	rl	lH	l1	l	
སླ	sl	sl	lH	l1	l	lʰ
བརླ	brl	brl	lH	l1	hl	vl
བསླ	bsl	bsl	lH	l1	hlʰ	
ལ	l	l	lL	l3	l	
ལྭ	lw	lʷ	lL	l3	l	
ལྷ	lh	l̥	ɬH	ɬ~l1	lʰ	
ཙ	ts	t͡s	t͡sH	t͡s1	t͡s	
རྩ	rts	rt͡s	t͡sH	t͡s1	ht͡s	
རྩྭ	rtsw	rt͡sʷ	t͡sH	t͡s1	ht͡s	
སྩྭ	stsw	st͡sʷ	t͡sH	t͡s1	ht͡s	
གཙ	gts	gt͡s	t͡sH	t͡s1	ht͡s	
བཙ	bts	bt͡s	t͡sH	t͡s1	ht͡s	
བརྩ	brts	brt͡s	t͡sH	t͡s1	ht͡s	
སྩ	sts	st͡s	t͡sH	t͡s1	t͡s	t͡sʰ
བསྩ	bsts	bst͡s	t͡sH	t͡s1	ht͡s	ht͡sʰ
རྫ	rdz	rd͡z	t͡sL	t͡s3	hd͡z	
གཛ	gdz	gd͡z	t͡sL	t͡s3	hd͡z	
བརྫ	brdz	brd͡z	t͡sL	t͡s3	hd͡z	
མཛ	mdz	md͡z	t͡sL	d͡z3	hd͡z	
འཛ	'dz	ⁿd͡z	t͡sL	d͡z3	ⁿd͡z	
ཚ	tsh	t͡sʰ	t͡sʰH	t͡sʰ2	t͡sʰ	
ཚྭ	tshw	t͡sʰʷ	t͡sʰH	t͡sʰ2	t͡sʰ	
མཚ	mtsh	mt͡sʰ	t͡sʰH	t͡sʰ2	ht͡sʰ	
འཚ	'tsh	ⁿt͡sʰ	t͡sʰH	t͡sʰ2	ⁿt͡sʰ	
ཛ	dz	d͡z	t͡sʰL	t͡sʰ3	t͡s	
ས	s	s	sH	s1	sʰ	
སྭ	sw	sʷ	sH	s1	sʰ	
སྲ	sr	sr	sH	s1	sʐ	
གས	gs	gs	sH	s1	hsʰ	
བས	bs	bs	sH	s1	hsʰ	
བསྲ	bsr	bsr	sH	s1	hsʐ	vsʐ
ཟ	z	z	sL	s3	s	
ཟྭ	zw	zʷ	sL	s3	s	
གཟ	gz	gz	sL	s3	hs	
བཟ	bz	bz	sL	s3	hs	vs
ཀྲ	kr	kr	ʈ͡ʂH	ʈ͡ʂ1	ʈ͡ʂ	
ཏྲ	tr	tr	ʈ͡ʂH	ʈ͡ʂ1	ʈ͡ʂ	
པྲ	pr	pr	ʈ͡ʂH	ʈ͡ʂ1	ʈ͡ʂ	
རྐྲ	rkr	rkr	ʈ͡ʂH	ʈ͡ʂ1	hʈ͡ʂ	
ལྐྲ	lkr	lkr	ʈ͡ʂH	ʈ͡ʂ1	hʈ͡ʂ	
དཀྲ	dkr	dkr	ʈ͡ʂH	ʈ͡ʂ1	hʈ͡ʂ	
ལྤྲ	lpr	lpr	ʈ͡ʂH	ʈ͡ʂ1	hʈ͡ʂ	
དཔྲ	dpr	dpr	ʈ͡ʂH	ʈ͡ʂ1	hʈ͡ʂ	
སྐྲ	skr	skr	ʈ͡ʂH	ʈ͡ʂ1	ʈ͡ʂ	ʈ͡ʂʰ
སྤྲ	spr	spr	ʈ͡ʂH	ʈ͡ʂ1	ʈ͡ʂ	ʈ͡ʂʰ
བཀྲ	bkr	bkr	ʈ͡ʂH	ʈ͡ʂ1	hʈ͡ʂ	vʈ͡ʂ
བསྐྲ	bskr	bskr	ʈ͡ʂH	ʈ͡ʂ1	hʈ͡ʂ	vʈ͡ʂʰ
བསྲ	bsr	bsr	ʈ͡ʂH	s1	hsʐ	vsʐ
ལྒྲ	lgr	lgr	ʈ͡ʂL	ɖ͡ʐ3	hʈ͡ʂ	
མགྲ	mgr	mgr	ʈ͡ʂL	ɖ͡ʐ3	hʈ͡ʂ	
རྒྲ	rgr	rgr	ʈ͡ʂL	ʈ͡ʂ3	hʈ͡ʂ	
དགྲ	dgr	dgr	ʈ͡ʂL	ʈ͡ʂ3	hʈ͡ʂ	
དབྲ	dbr	dbr	ʈ͡ʂL	ʈ͡ʂ3	hʈ͡ʂ	
རྦྲ	rbr	rbr	ʈ͡ʂL	ʈ͡ʂ3	hʈ͡ʂ	
ལྦྲ	lbr	lbr	ʈ͡ʂL	ɖ͡ʐ3	hʈ͡ʂ	
སྒྲ	sgr	sgr	ʈ͡ʂL	ʈ͡ʂ3	ʈ͡ʂ	ʈ͡ʂʰ
སྦྲ	sbr	sbr	ʈ͡ʂL	ʈ͡ʂ3	ʈ͡ʂ	ʈ͡ʂʰ
བསྒྲ	bsgr	bsgr	ʈ͡ʂL	ʈ͡ʂ3	hʈ͡ʂ	vʈ͡ʂ
འགྲ	'gr	ᵑgr	ʈ͡ʂL	ɖ͡ʐ3	ⁿʈ͡ʂ	
འདྲ	'dr	ⁿdr	ʈ͡ʂL	ɖ͡ʐ3	ⁿʈ͡ʂ	
འབྲ	'br	ᵐbr	ʈ͡ʂL	ɖ͡ʐ3	ⁿʈ͡ʂ	
ཁྲ	khr	kʰr	ʈ͡ʂʰH	ʈ͡ʂʰ2	ʈ͡ʂʰ	
ཐྲ	thr	tʰr	ʈ͡ʂʰH	ʈ͡ʂʰ2	ʈ͡ʂʰ	
ཕྲ	phr	pʰr	ʈ͡ʂʰH	ʈ͡ʂʰ2	ʈ͡ʂʰ	
མཁྲ	mkhr	mkʰr	ʈ͡ʂʰH	ʈ͡ʂʰ2	hʈ͡ʂʰ	
འཁྲ	'khr	ᵑkʰr	ʈ͡ʂʰH	ʈ͡ʂʰ2	ⁿʈ͡ʂʰ	
འཕྲ	'phr	ᵐpʰr	ʈ͡ʂʰH	ʈ͡ʂʰ2	ⁿʈ͡ʂʰ	
གྲ	gr	gr	ʈ͡ʂʰL	ʈ͡ʂʰ3	ʈ͡ʂ	
དྲ	dr	dr	ʈ͡ʂʰL	ʈ͡ʂʰ3	ʈ͡ʂ	
གྲྭ	grw	grʷ	ʈ͡ʂʰL	ʈ͡ʂʰ3	ʈ͡ʂ	
བྲ	br	br	ʈ͡ʂʰL	ʈ͡ʂʰ3	ʈ͡ʂ	
ཧྲ	hr	hr	ʂH	ʂ1	sʐ	
ར	r	r	ɹL	ɹ3	ʐ	
རྭ	rw	rʷ	ɹL	ɹ3	ʐ	
རཧ	rh	rh	ɹH	h1	h	
ཀྱ	ky	kʲ	cH	t͡ɕ1	t͡ɕ	
རྐྱ	rky	rkʲ	cH	t͡ɕ1	ht͡ɕ	
ལྐྱ	lky	lkʲ	cH	t͡ɕ1	ht͡ɕ	
དཀྱ	dky	dkʲ	cH	t͡ɕ1	ht͡ɕ	
སྐྱ	sky	skʲ	cH	t͡ɕ1	t͡ɕ	t͡ɕʰ
བཀྱ	bky	bkʲ	cH	t͡ɕ1	ht͡ɕ	vt͡ɕ
བརྐྱ	brky	brkʲ	cH	t͡ɕ1	ht͡ɕ	vt͡ɕ
བསྐྱ	bsky	bskʲ	cH	t͡ɕ1	ht͡ɕ	ht͡ɕʰ
རྒྱ	rgy	rgʲ	cL	t͡ɕ3	g	
སྒྱ	sgy	sgʲ	cL	t͡ɕ3	g	
ལྒྱ	lgy	lgʲ	cL	d͡ʑ3	g	
དགྱ	dgy	dgʲ	cL	t͡ɕ3	ht͡ɕʰ	
མགྱ	mgy	mgʲ	cL	d͡ʑ3	ht͡ɕʰ	
བགྱ	bgy	bgʲ	cL	d͡ʑ3	ht͡ɕʰ	vt͡ɕʰ
བརྒྱ	brgy	brgʲ	cL	d͡ʑ3	ht͡ɕʰ	vt͡ɕʰ
བསྒྱ	bsgy	bsgʲ	cL	d͡ʑ3	ht͡ɕʰ	vt͡ɕʰ
འགྱ	'gy	ᵑgʲ	cL	d͡ʑ3	ᶮt͡ɕʰ	
ཁྱ	khy	kʰʲ	cʰH	t͡ɕʰ2	t͡ɕʰ	
མཁྱ	mkhy	mkʰʲ	cʰH	t͡ɕʰ2	ht͡ɕʰ	
འཁྱ	'khy	ᵑkʰʲ	cʰH	t͡ɕʰ2	ᶮt͡ɕʰ	
གྱ	gy	gʲ	cʰL	t͡ɕ3	t͡ɕʰ	
ཧྱ	hy	hʲ	çH	h1	h	
ཅ	c	t͡ʃ	t͡ɕH	t͡ɕ1	t͡ɕ	
ཅྭ	cw	t͡ʃʷ	t͡ɕH	t͡ɕ1	t͡ɕ	
གཅ	gc	gt͡ʃ	t͡ɕH	t͡ɕ1	ht͡ɕ	
ལྕ	lc	lt͡ʃ	t͡ɕH	t͡ɕ1	ht͡ɕ	
བཅ	bc	bt͡ʃ	t͡ɕH	t͡ɕ1	ht͡ɕ	vt͡ɕ
པྱ	py	pʲ	t͡ɕH	t͡ɕ1	ɕ	
ལྤྱ	lpy	lpʲ	t͡ɕH	t͡ɕ1	hɕ	
དཔྱ	dpy	dpʲ	t͡ɕH	t͡ɕ1	hɕ	
སྤྱ	spy	spʲ	t͡ɕH	t͡ɕ1	ɕ	ɕʰ
རྦྱ	rby	rbʲ	t͡ɕL	t͡ɕ3	hɕ	
ལྦྱ	lby	lbʲ	t͡ɕL	d͡ʑ3	hɕ	
སྦྱ	sby	sbʲ	t͡ɕL	t͡ɕ3	ɕ	ɕʰ
རྗ	rj	rd͡ʒ	t͡ɕL	t͡ɕ3	hd͡ʑ	
གཇ	gj	gd͡ʒ	t͡ɕL	t͡ɕ3	hd͡ʑ	
ལྗ	lj	ld͡ʒ	t͡ɕL	d͡ʑ3	hd͡ʑ	
མཇ	mj	md͡ʒ	t͡ɕL	d͡ʑ3	hd͡ʑ	
བརྗ	brj	brd͡ʒ	t͡ɕL	t͡ɕ3	hd͡ʑ	vhd͡ʑ
འཇ	'j	ⁿd͡ʒ	t͡ɕL	d͡ʑ3	ⁿd͡ʑ	
འབྱ	'by	ᵐbʲ	t͡ɕL	d͡ʑ3	ⁿɕ	
ཆ	ch	t͡ʃʰ	t͡ɕʰH	t͡ɕʰ2	t͡ɕʰ	
མཆ	mch	mt͡ʃʰ	t͡ɕʰH	t͡ɕʰ2	ht͡ɕʰ	
འཆ	'ch	ⁿt͡ʃʰ	t͡ɕʰH	t͡ɕʰ2	ⁿt͡ɕʰ	
ཕྱ	phy	pʰʲ	t͡ɕʰH	t͡ɕʰ2	ɕ	
འཕྱ	'phy	ᵐpʰʲ	t͡ɕʰH	t͡ɕʰ2	ᶮɕʰ	
ཇ	j	d͡ʒ	t͡ɕʰL	t͡ɕʰ3	t͡ɕ	
བྱ	by	bʲ	t͡ɕʰL	t͡ɕʰ3	ɕ	
ཤ	sh	ʃ	ɕH	ɕ1	x	
ཤྭ	shw	ʃʷ	ɕH	ɕ1	xʷ	
གཤ	gsh	gʃ	ɕH	ɕ1	hx	
བཤ	bsh	bʃ	ɕH	ɕ1	hx	vx
ཞ	zh	ʒ	ɕL	ɕ3	ɕ	
ཞྭ	zhw	ʒʷ	ɕL	ɕ3	ɕ	
གཞ	gzh	gʒ	ɕL	ɕ3	hʑ	
བཞ	bzh	bʒ	ɕL	ɕ3	hʑ	vʑ
རྙ	rny	rɲ	ɲH	ɲ1	hɲ	
སྙ	sny	sɲ	ɲH	ɲ1	ɲ	ɲʰ
སྨྱ	smy	smʲ	ɲH	ɲ1	ɲ	ɲʰ
གཉ	gny	gɲ	ɲH	ɲ1	hɲ	
མཉ	mny	mɲ	ɲH	ɲ1	hɲ	
རྨྱ	rmy	rmʲ	ɲH	ɲ1	hɲ	
བརྙ	brny	brɲ	ɲH	ɲ1	hɲ	vhɲ
བསྙ	bsny	bsɲ	ɲH	ɲ1	hɲ	vhɲʰ
ཉྭ	nyw	ɲʷ	ɲH	ɲ4	ɲ	
ཉ	ny	ɲ	ɲL	ɲ4	ɲ	
མྱ	my	mʲ	ɲL	m4	ɲ	
གཡ	g.y	gʲ	jH	j1	c	
ཡ	y	j	jL	j4	j	
དབྱ	dby	dbʲ	jL	ʔ1, w3	j	
ཀ	k	k	kH	k1	k	
ཀྭ	kw	kʷ	kH	k1	k	
རྐ	rk	rk	kH	k1	hk	
ལྐ	lk	lk	kH	k1	hk	
དཀ	dk	dk	kH	k1	hk	
བཀ	bk	bk	kH	k1	kʷ	
སྐ	sk	sk	kH	k1	k	kʰ
བརྐ	brk	brk	kH	k1	hk	vhk
བསྐ	bsk	bsk	kH	k1	hk	hkʰ
རྒ	rg	rg	kL	k3	hg	
དག	dg	dg	kL	k3	hg	
ལྒ	lg	lg	kL	g3	hg	
མག	mg	mg	kL	g3	hg	
སྒ	sg	sg	kL	k3	g	
བག	bg	bg	kL	k3	hg	vg
བསྒ	bsg	bsg	kL	k3	hg	vg
བརྒ	brg	brg	kL	k3	hg	vhg
འག	'g	ᵑg	kL	g3	ᵑg	
ཁ	kh	kʰ	kʰH	kʰ2	kʰ	
ཁྭ	khw	kʰʷ	kʰH	kʰ2	kʰ	
མཁ	mkh	mkʰ	kʰH	kʰ2	hkʰ	
འཁ	'kh	ᵑkʰ	kʰH	kʰ2	ᵑkʰ	
ག	g	g	kʰL	kʰ3	k	
གྭ	gw	gʷ	kʰL	kʰ3	k	
རྔ	rng	rŋ	ŋH	ŋ1	hŋ	
ལྔ	lng	lŋ	ŋH	ŋ1	hŋ	
དང	dng	dŋ	ŋH	ŋ1	hŋ	
མང	mng	mŋ	ŋH	ŋ1	hŋ	
སྔ	sng	sŋ	ŋH	ŋ1	ŋ	ŋʰ
བརྔ	brng	brŋ	ŋH	ŋ1	hŋ	vhŋ
བསྔ	bsng	bsŋ	ŋH	ŋ1	hŋ	hŋʰ
ང	ng	ŋ	ŋL	ŋ4	ŋ	
ཨ	No consonantal onset	∅	ʔH	ʔ1	∅	
འ	'	ɣ	ʔ̞L	ʔ4	h	
ཧ	h	h	hH	h1	h	
ཧྭ	hw	hʷ	hH	h1	h	

== Rimes ==
This table shows rime sound correspondences between different Tibetic languages. These rules are near-universally applicable for the final syllables of words, but may differ in other contexts; see Sound correspondences between Tibetic languages#Irregular sound correspondences for more information.

The exact pronunciation of the tones in Lhasa Tibetan depends on the initial-derived tone and the exact rime. In Khams Tibetan, 1 denotes /˥/, 2 denotes /˦/, 3 denotes /˨/, and 4 denotes /˩/.

Tibetan Script	Wylie Transliteration	Old Tibetan	Lhasa Tibetan	Khams Tibetan	Amdo Tibetan
ཨ	a	a	aˑ˥ (H) a˩˨ (L)	a	
ཨའུ	a'u	aɣu	au̯˥ (H) au̯˩˨ (L)	ɑ	au̯
ཨར	ar	ar	aː˥ (H) aː˩˨ (L)	aɹ	aː
ཨལ	al	al	ɛː˥ (H) ɛː˩˨ (L)	ɛ	
ཨའི	a'i	aɣi	ai̯˥ (H) ai̯˩˨ (L)	ɛˑ	ai̯
ཨད	ad	at	ɛˑ˥˨ (H) ɛˑ˩˨ (L)	ɛʔ	ɛ
ཨས	as	as	ɛ˥˨ (H) ɛ˩˧˨ (L)	ɛʔ	ɛ
ཨག	ag	ak	ʌˑʡ˥˨ (H) ʌˑʡ˩˨ (L)	aʔ	
ཨགས	ags	aks	ʌʡ˥˨ (H) ʌʡ˩˧˨ (L)	aʔ	
ཨབ	ab	ap	ʌˑʡ̆˥˨ (H) ʌˑʡ̆˩˨ (L)	ap	
ཨབས	abs	aps	ʌʡ̆˥˨ (H) ʌʡ̆˩˧˨ (L)	ap	
ཨང	ang	aŋ	aŋ˥ (H) aŋ˩˨ (L)	aŋ	
ཨངས	angs	aŋs	aŋ˥˨ (H) aŋ˩˧˨ (L)	aŋ	
ཨམ	am	am	am˥ (H) am˩˨ (L)	am	
ཨམས	ams	ams	am˥˨ (H) am˩˧˨ (L)	am	
ཨན	an	an	ɛ̃ː˥ (H) ɛ̃ː˩˨ (L)	an	
ཨི	i	i	iˑ˥ (H) i˩˨ (L)	i	ə
ཨིའི	i'i	iɣi	N/A	iˑ	iː
ཨིད	id	it	iˑ˥˨ (H) iˑ˩˨ (L)	ɨʔ	iʔ
ཨིས	is	is	i˥˨ (H) i˩˧˨ (L)	ɨʔ	is
ཨིའུ	i'u	iɣu	iu̯˥ (H) iu̯˩˨ (L)	N/A	
ཨིའུ	e'u	eɣu	iu̯˥ (H) iu̯˩˨ (L)	N/A	
ཨིར	ir	ir	iːm˥ (H) iːm˩˨ (L)	iɹ	iː
ཨིལ	il	il	iːm˥ (H) iːm˩˨ (L)	i	il
ཨིག	ig	ik	iˑʡ˥˨ (H) iˑʡ˩˨ (L)	ɨʔ	iʔ
ཨིགས	igs	iks	iʡ˥˨ (H) iʡ˩˧˨ (L)	ɨʔ	iʔ
ཨིབ	ib	ip	iˑʡ̆˥˨ (H) iˑʡ̆˩˨ (L)	ip	
ཨིབས	ibs	ips	iʡ̆˥˨ (H) iʡ̆˩˧˨ (L)	ip	
ཨིང	ing	iŋ	ɪŋ˥ (H) ɪŋ˩˨ (L)	iŋ	
ཨིངས	ings	iŋs	ɪŋ˥˨ (H) ɪŋ˩˧˨ (L)	iŋ	
ཨིམ	im	im	ɪm˥ (H) ɪm˩˨ (L)	im	
ཨིམས	ims	ims	ɪm˥˨ (H) ɪm˩˧˨ (L)	im	
ཨིན	in	in	ĩː˥ (H) ĩː˩˨ (L)	in	
ཨུ	u	u	uˑ˥ (H) u˩˨ (L)	u	ə
ཨུར	ur	ur	uː˥ (H) uː˩˨ (L)	uɹ	uː
ཨུལ	ul	ul	yː˥ (H) yː˩˨ (L)	u	ə
ཨུའི	u'i	uɣi	yː˥ (H) yː˩˨ (L)	ui̯	
ཨུད	ud	ut	yˑ˥˨ (H) yˑ˩˨ (L)	ʉʔ	uʔ
ཨུས	us	us	y˥˨ (H) y˩˧˨ (L)	ʉʔ	uʔ
ཨུག	ug	uk	uˑʡ˥˨ (H) uˑʡ˩˨ (L)	ʉʔ	uʔ
ཨུགས	ugs	uks	uʡ˥˨ (H) uʡ˩˧˨ (L)	ʉʔ	uʔ
ཨུབ	ub	up	uˑʡ̆˥˨ (H) uˑʡ̆˩˨ (L)	up	
ཨུབས	ubs	ups	uʡ̆˥˨ (H) uʡ̆˩˧˨ (L)	up	
ཨུང	ung	uŋ	ʊŋ˥ (H) ʊŋ˩˨ (L)	uŋ	
ཨུངས	ungs	uŋs	ʊŋ˥˨ (H) ʊŋ˩˧˨ (L)	uŋ	
ཨུམ	um	um	ʊm˥ (H) ʊm˩˨ (L)	um	
ཨུམས	ums	ums	ʊm˥˨ (H) ʊm˩˧˨ (L)	um	
ཨུན	un	un	ỹː˥ (H) ỹː˩˨ (L)	un	
ཨེ	e	e	eˑ˥ (H) e˩˨ (L)	e	
ཨེད	ed	et	eˑ˥˨ (H) eˑ˩˨ (L)	eʔ	
ཨེས	es	es	e˥˨ (H) e˩˧˨ (L)	eʔ	
ཨེར	er	er	eː˥ (H) eː˩˨ (L)	eɹ	eː
ཨེལ	el	el	eː˥ (H) eː˩˨ (L)	e	el
ཨེའི	e'i	eɣi	eː˥ (H) eː˩˨ (L)	eˑ	ei̯
ཨེག	e.g.	ek	ɛ̈ˑʡ˥˨ (H) ɛ̈ˑʡ˩˨ (L)	eʔ	
ཨེགས	egs	eks	ɛ̈ʡ˥˨ (H) ɛ̈ʡ˩˧˨ (L)	eʔ	
ཨེབ	eb	ep	ɛ̈ˑʡ̆˥˨ (H) ɛ̈ˑʡ̆˩˨ (L)	ep	
ཨེབས	ebs	eps	ɛ̈ʡ̆˥˨ (H) ɛ̈ʡ̆˩˧˨ (L)	ep	
ཨེང	eng	eŋ	ɛŋ˥ (H) ɛŋ˩˨ (L)	eŋ	
ཨེངས	engs	eŋs	ɛŋ˥˨ (H) ɛŋ˩˧˨ (L)	eŋ	
ཨེམ	em	em	ɛm˥ (H) ɛm˩˨ (L)	em	
ཨེམས	ems	ems	ɛm˥˨ (H) ɛm˩˧˨ (L)	em	
ཨེན	en	en	ẽː˥ (H) ẽː˩˨ (L)	en	
ཨོ	o	o	oˑ˥ (H) o˩˨ (L)	o	
ཨོའུ	o'u	oɣu	ou̯˥ (H) ou̯˩˨ (L)	N/A	oʔ
ཨོར	or	or	oː˥ (H) oː˩˨ (L)	oɹ	oː
ཨོལ	ol	ol	øː˥ (H) øː˩˨ (L)	ø	ol
ཨོའི	o'i	oɣi	øː˥ (H) øː˩˨ (L)	ø	oi̯
ཨོད	od	ot	øˑ˥˨ (H) øˑ˩˨ (L)	ʊʔ	oʔ
ཨོས	os	os	ø˥˨ (H) ø˩˧˨ (L)	ʊʔ	oʔ
ཨོག	og	ok	ɔˑʡ˥˨ (H) ɔˑʡ˩˨ (L)	ʊʔ	oʔ
ཨོགས	ogs	oks	ɔʡ˥˨ (H) ɔʡ˩˧˨ (L)	ʊʔ	oʔ
ཨོབ	ob	op	ɔˑʡ̆˥˨ (H) ɔˑʡ̆˩˨ (L)	op	
ཨོབས	obs	ops	ɔʡ̆˥˨ (H) ɔʡ̆˩˧˨ (L)	op	
ཨོང	ong	oŋ	ɔŋ˥ (H) ɔŋ˩˨ (L)	oŋ	
ཨོངས	ongs	oŋs	ɔŋ˥˨ (H) ɔŋ˩˧˨ (L)	oŋ	
ཨོམ	om	om	ɔm˥ (H) ɔm˩˨ (L)	om	
ཨོམས	oms	oms	ɔm˥˨ (H) ɔm˩˧˨ (L)	om	
ཨོན	on	on	ø̃ː˥ (H) ø̃ː˩˨ (L)	on	

== Additional sound correspondences ==
=== Lhasa Tibetan ===
In multisyllabic words, the first syllable's tone transforms into /˥/ if the onset gives it a high tone (H) and transforms into /˩/ if the onset gives it a low tone (L).

The tone of the consecutive syllables change according to the following table:

Original Tone of Non-Initial Syllable	New Tone of Non-Initial Syllable Derived from Tone Sandhi
/˥˦/	/˥/ (if the first syllable is H) /˩˦/ (if the first syllable is L)
/˥/	/˥/ (if the first syllable is H) /˩˦/ (if the first syllable is L)
/˩˨/	/˥/ (if the first syllable is H) /˩˦/ (if the first syllable is L)
/˩˧/	/˥/ (if the first syllable is H) /˩˦/ (if the first syllable is L)
/˥˨/	/˥˨/
/˩˧˨/	/˥˨/

Several words and syllabic affixes in Lhasa Tibetan do not follow the regular rules for deriving tone and instead receive their tone from the noun or verb they modify. These words and affixes include མ ⟨ma⟩ (negation word), ཨ ⟨a⟩ (second person imperative marker), ཏུ ⟨tu⟩ (first person plural imperative marker), ལ ⟨la⟩ (dative and locative suffix), and ཝ ⟨wa⟩ (agenitive suffix).

Colloquial Lhasa Tibetan (but not formal readings) omit ཝ ⟨wa⟩ when it appears as the final syllable in a word. The vowel in the previous syllable lengthens if it existed as /a/, /o/, or /e/ in Old Tibetan; it forms a diphthong pronounced as [o] followed by the vowel if it existed as /i/ or /u/ in Old Tibetan.

Noninitial syllables always deaspirate any written aspirated consonants. If a syllable with an open coda in Old Tibetan (no written final consonant) is followed by a syllable with a prefixed or superjoined letter, then the prefixed or superjoined letter becomes the final consonant of the previous syllable.

If a word contains [i], [u], or [y] along with what would result in [a], [e], or [o], then [a] becomes [ə], [e] becomes [e̝], and [o] becomes [o̝].

=== Khams Tibetan ===
Bisyllabic words with a first syllable possessing tones 1 or 2 tend to retain the first syllable's tone in the second syllable, although some speakers pronounce both syllables according to the standard rules in certain words. Trisyllabic words have a falling contour in the final syllable. Quadrisyllabic words are pronounced like two consecutive bisyllabic words.

=== Amdo Tibetan ===
If a syllable with an open coda in Old Tibetan (no written final consonant) is followed by a syllable with a prefixed or superjoined letter, then the prefixed or superjoined letter becomes the final consonant of the previous syllable.

== See also ==
- Amdo Tibetan
- Khams Tibetan
- Lhasa Tibetan
- THL Simplified Phonetic Transcription
- Tibetan pinyin
- Wylie transliteration
