= Burmese numerals =

Burmese numerals (Burmese: မြန်မာ ကိန်းဂဏန်းများ, Burmese pronunciation: [mjàɰ̃mà kéiɰ̃ ɡa̰náɰ̃ mjá]) are a set of numerals traditionally used in the Burmese language, although Arabic numerals are also used. Burmese numerals follow the Hindu–Arabic numeral system commonly used in the rest of the world.

== Main numbers ==
Burmese numerals in various script styles (from the equivalent of zero to nine)

=== Zero to ten ===
The Burmese numerals from 1 to 10 are all etymologically traced back to the Proto-Sino-Tibetan language, with shared cognates in related languages like Tibetan and Chinese.

Number	Burmese		
Number	Numeral	Written (MLCTS)	IPA
0	၀	သုည^{1} (su.nya.)	IPA: [θòʊɰ̃ɲa̰]
1	၁	တစ် (tict)	IPA: [tɪʔ]
2	၂	နှစ် (hnic)	IPA: [n̥ɪʔ]
3	၃	သုံး (thone:)	IPA: [θóʊɰ̃]
4	၄	လေး (lae:)	IPA: [lé]
5	၅	ငါး (nga:)	IPA: [ŋá]
6	၆	ခြောက် (chouk)	IPA: [tɕʰaʊʔ]
7	၇	ခုနစ် (hkun. nic)	IPA: [kʰʊ̀ɰ̃ n̥ɪʔ]^{2}
8	၈	ရှစ် (hshit)	IPA: [ʃɪʔ]
9	၉	ကိုး (koe:)	IPA: [kó]
10	၁၀	တစ်ဆယ် (ta sae)	IPA: [sʰɛ̀]

^{1} Burmese for zero comes from Sanskrit śūnya.
^{2} Can be abbreviated to IPA: [kʰʊ̀ɰ̃] in list contexts, such as telephone numbers.

Spoken Burmese has innate pronunciation rules that govern numbers when they are combined with another word, be it a numerical place (e.g. tens, hundreds, thousands, etc.) or a measure word.

- For one, two, and seven (all of which end in the rhyme [-ɪʔ]), when combined, shift to an open vowel, namely the schwa ([ə])
- For three, four, five, and nine which all have the long tone (similar to the first tone in Mandarin Chinese), when combined, the word immediately following it, given that it begins with a consonant, shifts to a voiced consonant (e.g., ၄၀, "40" is pronounced [lé zɛ̀], not [lé sʰɛ̀]). Other suffixes such as ထောင် ([tʰàʊɰ̃]; thousand), သောင်း ([θáʊɰ̃]; ten thousand), သိန်း ([θéɪɰ̃]; hundred thousand), and သန်း ([θáɰ̃]; million) all shift to ([dàʊɰ̃]; thousand), ([ðáʊɰ̃]; ten thousand), ([ðéɪɰ̃]; hundred thousand), and [ðáɰ̃]; million), respectively.
- For six and eight, no pronunciation shift occurs.

These pronunciation shifts are exclusively confined to spoken Burmese and are not spelt any differently.

=== Ten to a million ===
While the Burmese numbers from 'hundred' to 'ten thousand' are etymologically traced back to the Proto-Sino-Tibetan language, the numbers for 'hundred thousand' may be an areal word. The numbers beyond 'million' are derived from Pali.

Number	Burmese		
Number	Numeral	Written	IPA
10	၁၀	တစ်ဆယ်	IPA: [təsʰɛ̀]^{1}
11	၁၁	တစ်ဆယ်တစ်	IPA: [təsʰɛ̰ tɪʔ] or [sʰɛʔ tɪʔ]
12	၁၂	တစ်ဆယ်နှစ်	IPA: [təsʰɛ̰ n̥ɪʔ] or [sʰɛʔ n̥ɪʔ]
20	၂၀	နှစ်ဆယ်	IPA: [n̥əsʰɛ̀]
21	၂၁	နှစ်ဆယ့်တစ်	IPA: [n̥əsʰɛ̰ tɪʔ] or [n̥əsʰɛʔ tɪʔ]
22	၂၂	နှစ်ဆယ့်နှစ်	IPA: [n̥əsʰɛ̰ n̥ɪʔ] or [n̥əsʰɛʔ n̥ɪʔ]
100	၁၀၀	ရာ	IPA: [jà]
1 000	၁၀၀၀	ထောင်	IPA: [tʰàʊɰ̃]^{1}
10 000	၁၀၀၀၀	သောင်း	IPA: [θáʊɰ̃]^{1}
100 000	၁၀၀၀၀၀	သိန်း	IPA: [θéɪɰ̃]^{1}
1 000 000	၁၀၀၀၀၀၀	သန်း	IPA: [θáɰ̃]^{1}
10 000 000	၁၀၀၀၀၀၀၀	ကုဋေ	IPA: [ɡədè]
1 × 10^{14}	.	ကောဋိ	IPA: [kɔ́dḭ]
1 × 10^{21}	.	ပကောဋိ	IPA: [pəkɔ́dḭ]
1 × 10^{28}	.	ကောဋိပကောဋိ	IPA: [kɔ́dḭpəkɔ́dḭ]
1 × 10^{35}	.	နဟုတံ	IPA: [nəhoʊ̼ʔtàɰ̃]
1 × 10^{42}	.	နိန္နဟုတံ	IPA: [neɪɰ̃nəhoʊ̼ʔtàɰ̃]
1 × 10^{49}	.	အက္ခဘေိဏီ	IPA: [ʔɛʔkʰàbènì]
1 × 10^{56}	.	ဗိန္ဒု	IPA: [beɪɰ̃du̼]
1 × 10^{63}	.	အဗ္ဗုဒ	IPA: [àɰ̃bu̼da̼]
1 × 10^{70}	.	နိရဗ္ဗုဒ	IPA: [ni̼ràɰ̃bu̼da̼]
1 × 10^{77}	.	အဗဗ	IPA: [ʔəbəba̼]
1 × 10^{84}	.	အဋဋ	IPA: [ʔətəta̼]
1 × 10^{91}	.	သောကန္ဓိက	IPA: [θɔ́kàɰ̃di̼ka̼]
1 × 10^{98}	.	ဥပ္ပလ	IPA: [ʔoʊ̯pəla̼]
1 × 10^{105}	.	ကုမုဒ	IPA: [ku̼mùda̼]
1 × 10^{112}	.	ပဒုမ	IPA: [pədùma̼]
1 × 10^{119}	.	ပုဏ္ဍရိက	IPA: [pòʊ̯dəri̼ka̼]
1 × 10^{126}	.	ကထာန	IPA: [kətàna̼]
1 × 10^{133}	.	မဟာကထာန	IPA: [məhàkətàna̼]
1 × 10^{140}	.	အသင်္ချေ^{2}	IPA: [əθìɰ̃ tɕʰèi]

^{1} Shifts to voiced consonant following three, four, five, and nine.

^{2} Athinche (အသင်္ချေ) sometimes could mean "too large to be counted".

Ten to nineteen are almost always expressed without including တစ် (one).

Another pronunciation rule shifts numerical place name (the tens, hundreds and thousands place) from the low tone to the creaky tone.

- Number places from 10 (တစ်ဆယ်) up to 10^{7} (ကုဋေ) has increment of 10^{1}. Beyond those Number places, larger number places have increment of 10^{7}. 10^{14} (ကောဋိ) up to 10^{140} (အသင်္ချေ) has increment of 10^{7}.
- There are totally 27 major number places in Burmese numerals from 1×10^{0} to 10^{140}
- Numbers in the tens place: shift from ဆယ် ([sʰɛ̀], low tone) to ဆယ့် ([sʰɛ̰], creaky tone), except in numbers divisible by ten (10, 20, 30, etc.) In typical speech, the shift goes farther to ([sʰɛʔ] or [zɛʔ]).
- Numbers in the hundreds place: shift from ရာ ([jà], low tone) to ရာ့ ([ja̰], creaky tone), except for numbers divisible by 100.
- Numbers in the thousands place: shift from ထောင် ([tʰàʊɰ̃], low tone) to ထောင့် ([tʰa̰ʊɰ̃], creaky tone), except for numbers divisible by 1000.

Hence, a number like 301 is pronounced [θóʊɰ̃ ja̰ tɪʔ] (သုံးရာ့တစ်), while 300 is pronounced [θóʊɰ̃ jà] (သုံးရာ).

The digits of a number are expressed in order of decreasing digits place. For example, 1,234,567 is expressed as follows (where the highlighted portions represent numbers whose tone has shifted from low → creaky:

Numeral		1,000,000	200,000	30,000	4,000	500	60	7
Burmese
Burmese	IPA	[təθáɰ̃]^{1}	[n̥əθeɪɰ̃]^{1}	[θóʊɰ̃ ðáʊɰ̃]	[lé da̰ʊɰ̃]	[ŋá ja̰]	[tɕʰaʊʔ sʰɛ̰]	[kʰʊ̀ɰ̃ n̥ɪʔ]
Burmese	Written	တစ်သန်း	နှစ်သိန်း	သုံးသောင်း	လေးထောင့်	ငါးရာ့	ခြောက်ဆယ့်	ခုနစ်

^{1} When combined with the numeral place, the pronunciations for 1 and 2 shift from a checked tone (glottal stop) to an open vowel ([ə]).

==== Round number rule ====
When a number is used as an adjective, the standard word order is number + measure word:

၅ ခွက်
five CL
'5 cups'

In spoken Burmese, for round numbers (numbers ending in zeroes), the word order is flipped to measure word + number:

ခွက် ၂၀
CL twenty
'20 cups'

The exception to this rule is the number 10, which follows the standard word order.

၁၀ ခွက်
ten CL
'10 cups'

=== Ordinal numbers ===
Ordinal numbers, from first to tenth, are Burmese pronunciations of their Pali equivalents. They are prefixed to the noun. Beyond that, cardinal numbers can be raised to the ordinal by suffixing the particle မြောက် ([mjaʊʔ], lit. 'to raise') to the number in the following order: number + measure word + မြောက်.

Ordinal	Burmese		Pali equivalent
Ordinal	Burmese	IPA	Pali equivalent
First	ပထမ	IPA: [pətʰəma̰]	paṭhama
Second	ဒုတိယ	IPA: [dṵtḭja̰]	dutiya
Third	တတိယ	IPA: [taʔtḭja̰]	tatiya
Fourth	စတုတ္ထ	IPA: [zədoʊʔtʰa̰]	catuttha
Fifth	ပဉ္စမ	IPA: [pjɪ̀ɰ̃səma̰]	pañcama
Sixth	ဆဋ္ဌမ	IPA: [sʰaʔtʰa̰ma̰]	chaṭṭhama
Seventh	သတ္တမ	IPA: [θaʔtəma̰]	sattama
Eighth	အဋ္ဌမ	IPA: [ʔaʔtʰama̰]	aṭṭhama
Ninth	နဝမ	IPA: [nəwəma̰]	navama
Tenth	ဒသမ	IPA: [daʔθəma̰]	dasama

=== Decimal and fractional numbers ===
Colloquially, decimal numbers are formed by saying ဒသမ ([daʔθəma̰], Pali for 'tenth') where the decimal separator is located:

ဆယ် ဒသမ တစ်
ten decimal one
'10.1'

Half (1/2) is expressed primarily by တစ်ဝက် ([təwɛʔ]), although ထက်ဝက်, အခွဲ and အခြမ်း are also used. Quarter (1/4) is expressed with အစိတ် ([ʔəseɪʔ]) or တစ်စိတ်. Other fractional numbers are verbally expressed as follows: denominator + ပုံ ([pòʊɰ̃]) + numerator + ပုံ (lit. 'portion'):

လေး ပုံ သုံး ပုံ
four portions three portions
'3/4'

=== Alternate numbers ===
Other numbers, not of Tibeto-Burman origin, are also found in the Burmese language, usually from Pali or Sanskrit. They are exceedingly rare in modern usage.

Number	Pali derivatives	Sanskrit derivatives	Hindi derivatives
1	ဧက ([ʔèka̰], from Pali eka)		
2	ဒွိ ([dwḭ], from Pali dvi)		
3	တိ (from Pali ti)	တြိ ([tɹḭ], from Sanskrit tri)	
4	စတု ([zətṵ], from Pali catu)		ဇယ (from Hindi चार)
5	ပဉ္စ ([pjɪ̀ɴsa̰], from Pali pañca)		
9	နဝ ([nəwa̰], from Pali nava)		

=== Abbreviations ===
To indicate prices of merchandise, a circle is placed above the final zero of the price and a slash is added to indicate currency:

'2,500': ၂၅၀၀ိ/ = $၂၅၀၀

== See also ==
- Burmese language
- Burmese numerical classifiers
- Indian numbering system
- Indian numerals
