= Rounding fraud =

Financial fraud tactic

Rounding fraud is a type of financial fraud using round numbers. It is frequently caught by the over usage of certain statistically improbable number patterns. A notable example of rounding fraud was committed by the India-based company Satyam Computer Services which was detected in 2019, and it is typical in the context of Medicare fraud at Skilled Nursing Facilities (SNFs). It is also an element in microtransaction scams involving credit cards and front companies.
