= Round number =

Integer ending in zeroes

A round number is an integer that ends with one or more "0"s (zero-digit) in a given base. So, 590 is rounder than 592, but 590 is less round than 600. In both technical and informal language, a round number is often interpreted to stand for a value or values near to the nominal value expressed. For instance, a round number such as 600 might be used to refer to a value whose magnitude is actually 592, because the actual value is more cumbersome to express exactly. Likewise, a round number may refer to a range of values near the nominal value that expresses imprecision about a quantity. Thus, a value reported as 600 might actually represent any value near 600, possibly as low as 550 or as high as 649, all of which would round to 600.

In decimal notation, a number ending in the digit "5" is also considered more round than one ending in another non-zero digit (but less round than any which ends with "0"). For example, the number 25 tends to be seen as more round than 24. Thus someone might say, upon turning 45, that their age is more round than when they turn 44 or 46. These notions of roundness are also often applied to non-integer numbers; so, in any given base, 2.3 is rounder than 2.297, because 2.3 can be written as 2.300. Thus, a number with fewer digits which are not trailing "0"s is considered to be rounder than others of the same or greater precision.

Numbers can also be considered "round" in numbering systems other than decimal (base 10). For example, the number 1024 would not be considered round in decimal, but the same number ends with a zero in several other numbering systems including binary (base 2: 10000000000), octal (base 8: 2000), and hexadecimal (base 16: 400). The previous discussion about the digit "5" generalizes to the digit representing b/2 for base-b notation, if b is even.

== Psychology and sociology ==
Psychologically, round numbers form waypoints in pricing and negotiation. So, starting salaries are usually round numbers. Prices are often pitched just below round numbers to avoid breaking the psychological barrier of paying the price of the round number.

== Culture ==
Round-number anniversaries are often especially celebrated. For example, a fiftieth birthday, the centenary of an event, or the millionth visitor or customer to a location or business.

On 1 January 2000, the round-number year 2000 was widely celebrated. Technically, according to some sources, the 3rd millennium did not begin until 1 January 2001, a year later, as there is no year zero in the Gregorian calendar. However, the astronomical year zero is −1 (1 BC) according to the latter.

== Round number bias ==
Round number bias is the psychological tendency to prefer round numbers over others, which is passed onto a person through socialization. Round numbers are also easier for a person to remember, process, and perform mathematical operations on.

Round number bias has been observed mainly in retail and grocery, where prices are often just slightly less than a rounded number (ex. $9.99 or $9.95), in investments, including crowdfunding, in the real estate market through mortgages, and number milestones.

Round numbers are often used when estimating the time taken to complete a task.

== Mathematics ==
A round number is mathematically defined as an integer which is the product of a considerable number of comparatively small factors as compared to its neighboring numbers, such as 24 = 2 × 2 × 2 × 3 (4 factors, as opposed to 3 factors for 27; 2 factors for 21, 22, 25, and 26; and 1 factor for 23).

== See also ==
- Rounding
- Rounding fraud
- Significant figures
- Smooth number
- Unix billennium
