= Verb conjugations in Circassian =

Circassian (Adyghe–Kabardian) is conjugated polypersonally: the verb agrees with several of its arguments at once, and a single word can encode a subject, an object, an indirect object, tense, direction, negation and more. Verbs are classified by transitivity and valency — how many arguments they take, and in which cases — into monovalent intransitive, bivalent intransitive, bivalent transitive and trivalent ditransitive types (with labile and causative verbs besides); this article tabulates the conjugation of a representative verb of each, comparing Adyghe (West Circassian) and Kabardian (East Circassian) side by side.

The two languages share one morphological system but differ in regular ways — pronouns (Шъо/Тэ vs Фэ/Дэ), the consonant voicing of Kabardian, its dynamic present-tense vowel -о-, and its collapse of the third-person singular/plural distinction that Adyghe still keeps.

== Structure of the verbal complex ==
Adyghe (West Circassian) and Kabardian (East Circassian) are closely related Northwest Caucasian languages whose verbs are built on a single, highly templatic polysynthetic model. In both languages the verb root is surrounded by a rigid sequence of prefixal and suffixal slots, numbered here from −12 (leftmost prefix) through 0 (the root) to +7 (rightmost suffix). The prefixal slots form an argument-structure zone, in which the verb cross-references its absolutive, oblique (indirect-object) and ergative (agent) participants, followed by a smaller set of pre-stem elements; the suffixal slots encode categories such as aspect, tense, mood, negation and plurality. The two languages largely share this template and differ mainly in the phonological shape of individual affixes, as set out below.

=== Slot template (overview) ===
Order of slots in the verb (negative = prefix, 0 = root, positive = suffix)
Prefixes												Root	Suffixes						
−12	−11	−10	−9	−8	−7	−6	−5	−4	−3	−2	−1	0	+1	+2	+3	+4	+5	+6	+7
Abs	Cisl/ Transl	Manner/ Fact	IO (Obl)	Appl	Loc	Prep	Agt (Erg)	Dyn	Opt/ Juss	Neg	Caus	√ ROOT	Rep	Pot	Tense	Real	Pl	Dyn	Mood/ Neg

=== Markers filling each slot ===
Combined structure of the Adyghe (ady) and Kabardian (kbd) verbal complex
Slot	Category	Adyghe	Kabardian	Gloss / meaning
−12	Absolutive	с-		1SG
−12	Absolutive	у-		2SG
−12	Absolutive	т-	д-	1PL
−12	Absolutive	шъу-	ф-	2PL
−12	Absolutive	∅		3 (no overt marker)
−11	Cislocative / Translocative	къ-		hither (cislocative)
−11	Cislocative / Translocative	—	ны-	toward (translocative)
−10	Manner / Factive	зэрэ-	зэры-	the way that…; factive
−9	Indirect object (Oblique)	с-		1SG
−9	Indirect object (Oblique)	у-, п-		2SG
−9	Indirect object (Oblique)	т-	д-	1PL
−9	Indirect object (Oblique)	шъу-	ф-	2PL
−9	Indirect object (Oblique)	е-		3SG
−9	Indirect object (Oblique)	а-, я-		3PL
−8	Applicative	фэ-	хуэ-	for (benefactive)
−8	Applicative	шӀо-	фӀэ-	against (malefactive)
−8	Applicative	дэ-		with (comitative)
−7	Locative	щы-		at
−6	Prepositional (locative preverbs)	те-		on
−6	Prepositional (locative preverbs)	чӀэ-	щӀэ-	under
−6	Prepositional (locative preverbs)	хэ-		within / among
−6	Prepositional (locative preverbs)	дэ-		in
−6	Prepositional (locative preverbs)	пы-		on / attached to
−6	Prepositional (locative preverbs)	и-		in(side)
−6	Prepositional (locative preverbs)	къо-	къуэ-	behind
−6	Prepositional (locative preverbs)	Ӏу-		at / near
−6	Prepositional (locative preverbs)	го-	гуэ-	beside
−6	Prepositional (locative preverbs)	бгъодэ-	—	beside / next to
−6	Prepositional (locative preverbs)	кӀоцӀы-	кӀуэцӀы-	within / inside
−5	Agent (Ergative)	с-		1SG
−5	Agent (Ergative)	у-		2SG
−5	Agent (Ergative)	т-	д-	1PL
−5	Agent (Ergative)	шъу-	ф-	2PL
−5	Agent (Ergative)	е-	и-	3SG
−5	Agent (Ergative)	а-, я-		3PL
−4	'Dynamic' prefix	мэ-		3rd person
−4	'Dynamic' prefix	э-	о-	positive present
−3	Optative / Jussive	рэ-		optative / jussive
−2	Negation	мы-		negation (preverbal NEG)
−1	Causative	гъэ-		causative (CAUS)
0	Root	[verb]		verb stem
+1	Repetition	-жь	-ж	again (re-)
+2	Potential	-шъу	-ф	can / be able to
+3	Tense	-гъэ	-ащ	past (PST)
+3	Tense	-щт	-ну	future (FUT)
+3	Tense	-щтыгъ	-(р)т	imperfect (IMPF)
+3	Tense	-гъагъ	-ат	past perfect (PP)
+4	Realization / Completion	-х		realization / completion
+5	Plural	-х	-хэ	3rd person plural absolutive (PL)
+6	Dynamic suffix	-рэ		dynamic suffix
+7	Mood / Negation	-п	-къым	negative (NEG)
+7	Mood / Negation	-мэ		conditional (COND)
+7	Mood / Negation	-ми		concessive (CONC)
+7	Mood / Negation	-а	—	interrogative (Q)
+7	Mood / Negation	-ба	-къэ	negative interrogative (NEG.Q)
+7	Mood / Negation	-и		and (additive)
+7	Mood / Negation	-эу	-у	adverbial (ADV)

== Transitivity and valency ==
Verbs in the Circassian languages — both Adyghe (West) and Kabardian (East) — may be intransitive, transitive or ditransitive. Their valency — the number of arguments they require — sorts them into four main classes, one of which is conjugated in full in each of the sections below:

The four valency classes conjugated in this article
Class	Arguments it takes	Model verb
Monovalent intransitive	absolutive subject	плъэн "to look"
Bivalent intransitive	absolutive subject + oblique object	еплъын "to look at"
Bivalent transitive	ergative subject + absolutive object	лъэгъун "to see"
Trivalent ditransitive	ergative subject + absolutive object + oblique object	етын "to give"

Every one of those classes is built from the same three core cases. A verb may hold at most three arguments — one of each:

The three core cases
Case	Typical role	Suffix on the noun
Absolutive	subject of an intransitive verb, or direct object ("him/it") of a transitive one	-р
Ergative	subject (the agent) of a transitive verb	-м
Oblique	indirect object ("to/at him")	-м

Two kinds of verb sit outside this scheme. Labile (ambitransitive) verbs work both ways: their transitive direct object is the same thing as the subject of their intransitive use. Causative verbs add a causer ("make/let someone do it") and so raise the valency by one step — intransitive → transitive, bivalent transitive → trivalent (see Causative). For worked sentences illustrating each case role, see the main article Circassian verb transitivity.

== The directional ("hither") prefix ==
Most Circassian verb forms come in two shapes: a plain Base form and a directional form (here labelled Dir). The directional adds the prefix Adyghe къэ- / Kabardian къы-, which aims the action toward the speaker — or toward some other point of reference already in view. Linguists call this a venitive or "hither" marker. English has no such prefix, but it draws the very same line with separate words — the action either heads away (or nowhere in particular) or comes toward you:

The "hither" idea in everyday English
	away / neutral	toward me ("hither")
motion	go	come
handing something over	take, carry	bring

"Come here!" and "Bring it to me" already point the action back at the speaker; Circassian folds that same meaning into a single prefix and can attach it to almost any verb. So Маплъэ "he looks" becomes Къэплъэ "he looks this way / over here" — exactly the step from go to come. The conjugation tables in the sections below show only one form per cell, so this section gathers the directional in one place: when it is freely optional, and when it is all but obligatory. (Purely static verbs — "sit", "stand", "lie" — are the exception: they take no directional at all.)

=== Direct vs. inverse: the 1 > 2 > 3 hierarchy ===
Whether the directional is optional turns on a ranking of the persons: 1 > 2 > 3 — the speaker outranks the addressee, who outranks a third party. A combination is direct when its subject outranks (or ties) its object — for example "I look at him" (1 acting on 3), or "he looks at him" (3 on 3). It is inverse when a lower-ranked subject acts on a higher-ranked object — "he looks at me" (3 on 1), or "you look at me" (2 on 1).

In a direct combination a plain Base form exists and the directional is simply an optional extra. In an inverse combination the plain form is dispreferred to the point that the directional has effectively hardened into the verb. Kabardian goes one step further than Adyghe, generalising the obligatory directional to every 1st/2nd-person ("local") object, not just the strictly inverse ones.

=== The hierarchy across the verb classes ===
As noted above, the directional is an optional extra in a direct combination — both forms are fine (Сеплъы → Сыкъеплъы "I look at him [this way]"; Kbd Соплъ → Сыкъоплъ) — but semi-mandatory in an inverse one, where the bare form, though still constructible, sounds distinctly off, exactly as English insists on "he comes to me", not *"he goes to me". Going through the singular person combinations one verb class at a time shows where this split falls — and reveals that it is keyed to the case of the object. (In these singular cells Proto- and Modern Kabardian coincide, so a single Kabardian column is given; all forms are present tense.)

Monovalent intransitive — no object to rank. With a single absolutive argument there is nothing to outrank, so the directional keeps only its plain "toward here" sense and is optional for every person: Сэплъэ / Оплъэ / Маплъэ "I / you / he look(s)" (Kbd Соплъэ / Уоплъэ / Маплъэ), each optionally taking къэ- / къы- (Сэплъэ → Сыкъэплъэ, Соплъэ → Сыкъоплъэ).

Bivalent intransitive — oblique object, the clearest case. The directional tracks the hierarchy exactly (еплъын / еплъын "to look at"):

Bivalent intransitive: the directional follows 1 > 2 > 3
Subject → Object	Direct / inverse	Modern Adyghe	Kabardian
1 → 3 "I look at him"	direct	Сеплъы	Соплъ
2 → 3 "you look at him"	direct	Уеплъы	Уоплъ
3 → 3 "he looks at him"	direct (tie)	Еплъы	Йоплъ
1 → 2 "I look at you"	direct (1 > 2)	Сыоплъы	Сыноплъ (translocative)
2 → 1 "you look at me"	inverse	Укъысэплъы	Укъызоплъ
3 → 1 "he looks at me"	inverse	Къысэплъы	Къызоплъ
3 → 2 "he looks at you"	inverse	Къыоплъы	Къоплъ

The three inverse cells obligatorily take the venitive; the direct cells leave it optional. The giveaway is Kabardian Сыноплъ "I look at you": 1→2 is direct, yet Kabardian still marks it — with the translocative н- ("away"), the mirror of the cislocative къ- ("toward") in Укъызоплъ "you look at me". Adyghe shows the same ranking through the bare-vs-marked asymmetry Сыоплъы (1→2) vs Укъысэплъы (2→1).

Bivalent transitive — absolutive object, no inverse gap. When the object is absolutive there is no inverse gap at all: even the would-be inverse cells keep a plain base form (ылъэгъун / лъагъун "to see"):

Bivalent transitive: directional optional everywhere
Subject → Object	Modern Adyghe	Kabardian
1 → 3 "I see him"	Сэлъэгъу	Солъагъу
2 → 3 "you see him"	Олъэгъу	Уолъагъу
1 → 2 "I see you"	Усэлъэгъу	Узолъагъу
2 → 1 "you see me"	Сыолъэгъу	Сыболъагъу
3 → 1 "he sees me"	Селъэгъу	Селъагъу
3 → 2 "he sees you"	Уелъэгъу	Уелъагъу
3 → 3 "he sees him"	Елъэгъу	Елъагъу

The venitive (Сэлъэгъу → Къэсэлъэгъу "I see him [this way]") is a free option in every cell, the inverse ones included — so the inverse effect is bound to the oblique slot, not the absolutive.

Trivalent ditransitive — oblique indirect object. The recipient is oblique, so it behaves like the bivalent intransitive (етын / етын "to give"; direct object "it" = 3SG):

Trivalent ditransitive: the directional follows subject vs. recipient
Subject → Recipient	Direct / inverse	Modern Adyghe	Kabardian
1 → 3 "I give it to him"	direct	Есэты	Изот
2 → 3 "you give it to him"	direct	Еоты	Ибот
3 → 3 "he gives it to him"	direct (tie)	Реты	Ирет
1 → 2 "I give it to you"	direct (1 > 2)	Къыосэты	Узот
2 → 1 "you give it to me"	inverse	Къысэоты	Къызыбот
3 → 1 "he gives it to me"	inverse	Къысеты	Къызет
3 → 2 "he gives it to you"	inverse	Къыуеты	Къыует

The inverse cells again carry the venitive in both languages. (The direct 1→2 "give it to you" is cited with къ- in Adyghe — the gift aimed at the addressee — but bare, Узот, in Kabardian.)

In sum, the directional is keyed to the case of the object: with an oblique object (look at, give) it is forced in every inverse combination; with an absolutive object (see) there is no inverse gap; and with no object (look) it is simply a free "toward here" option. Kabardian additionally marks every local object and, in the bivalent intransitive, spells out the outward 1→2 direction with the translocative н-. For this reason the inverse (and, in Kabardian, every local-object) cells throughout the conjugation tables below already show the directional form; the marginal bare form is omitted.

== Monovalent Intransitive Verbs conjugation ==
A monovalent intransitive verb has a single argument, an absolutive subject. With no object to agree with, only one personal prefix appears — the simplest paradigm, and a baseline for everything that follows. Both literary languages build it on Adyghe плъэн / Kabardian плъэн /pɬan/ "to look".

The verb template. A Circassian verb is built by stacking prefixes in a fixed order in front of the root. The full skeleton, which every section in this article draws on, is:

The Circassian verb template (slot order)
ABS	CIS	OBL	ERG	DYN	Root
absolutive (subject / object)	directional къэ- / къы-	oblique (indirect object)	ergative (agent)	dynamic (present tense)	verb stem

A verb fills only the slots it needs and leaves the rest empty. A monovalent intransitive has just one person — the absolutive subject — so it uses only ABS, the optional CIS (directional), the DYN present marker and the Root:

Slots used by плъэн / плъэн "to look"
	ABS (subject)	CIS (directional)	DYN (present)	Root (+ tense)
Adyghe — present	сы-, о-, тэ-, …	(къэ-)	-э-	плъэ
Adyghe — past	сы-, о-, тэ-, …	(къэ-)	—	плъэ + -гъ
Kabardian — present	сы-, у-, дэ-, …	(къы-)	-о-	плъэ
Kabardian — past	сы-, у-, дэ-, …	(къэ-)	—	плъэ + -ащ

Parentheses mark the optional directional; "—" marks an empty slot. (In the 3rd person, where the absolutive prefix is zero, the present marker appears instead at the front of the word as ма-/мэ- — see the next table.)

The key contrast is present vs. past: the present carries a dynamic marker that the past drops. Its shape depends on the person — and, in the 3rd person, on the verb:

The present-tense dynamic marker
Person / verb	Marker (present)	present	past (marker dropped)
3rd person, anti-passive verb (e.g. плъэн "look")	prefix ма- (same in both languages)	Ady: Маплъэ; Kbd: Маплъэ	Ady: Плъагъэ; Kbd: Плъащ
3rd person, other verb (e.g. уцун "stop", увын "stand")	prefix мэ- (same in both languages)	Ady: Мэуцу; Kbd: Мэувы	Ady: Уцугъ; Kbd: Уващ
1st / 2nd person	a vowel fused into the subject prefix: Ady -э-, Kbd -о-	Ady: Сэплъэ; Kbd: Соплъэ	Ady: Сыплъагъэ; Kbd: Сыплъащ

The three language columns. The config column gives the absolutive subject pronoun in each variety; the form columns are Modern Adyghe, Proto-Kabardian and Modern Kabardian. Adyghe is conservative — its modern literary form still keeps the older number distinctions — so it needs only one column. Kabardian innovated, so it gets two: Proto-Kabardian is the older, fully number-distinguishing paradigm (with a 3rd-person-plural -хэ), while Modern Kabardian is that same paradigm with every 3rd-person plural collapsed to the singular — the verb no longer marks 3PL number at all, and the free pronoun ахэр carries it instead. In this monovalent verb the two Kabardian columns therefore diverge only in the 3rd-person-plural rows (Маплъэхэ → Маплъэ).

Conjugation of плъэн / плъэн (to look) — present and past tense
Config	Tense	Modern Adyghe	Proto- Kabardian	Modern Kabardian	English
Subject: 1st Person Singular — Ady Сэ / Kbd Сэ
Ady: Сэ; Kbd: Сэ	Pres.	Сэплъэ	Соплъэ	Соплъэ	I look
Ady: Сэ; Kbd: Сэ	Pst.	Сыплъагъ	Сыплъащ	Сыплъащ	I looked
Subject: 1st Person Plural — Ady Тэ / Kbd Дэ
Ady: Тэ; Kbd: Дэ	Pres.	Тэплъэ	Доплъэ	Доплъэ	We look
Ady: Тэ; Kbd: Дэ	Pst.	Тыплъагъ	Дыплъащ	Дыплъащ	We looked
Subject: 2nd Person Singular — Ady О / Kbd Уэ
Ady: О Kbd: Уэ	Pres.	Оплъэ	Уоплъэ	Уоплъэ	You look
Ady: О Kbd: Уэ	Pst.	Уплъагъ	Уплъащ	Уплъащ	You looked
Subject: 2nd Person Plural — Ady Шъо / Kbd Фэ
Ady: Шъо; Kbd: Фэ	Pres.	Шъоплъэ	Фоплъэ	Фоплъэ	Y'all look
Ady: Шъо; Kbd: Фэ	Pst.	Шъуплъагъ	Фыплъащ	Фыплъащ	Y'all looked
Subject: 3rd Person Singular (Person A) — Ady Ар / Kbd Ар
Ady: Ар; Kbd: Ар	Pres.	Маплъэ	Маплъэ	Маплъэ	He looks
Ady: Ар; Kbd: Ар	Pst.	Плъагъ	Плъащ	Плъащ	He looked
Subject: 3rd Person Plural (Group A) — Ady Ахэр / Kbd Ахэр
Ady: Ахэр; Kbd: Ахэр	Pres.	Маплъэх	Маплъэхэ	Маплъэ	They look
Ady: Ахэр; Kbd: Ахэр	Pst.	Плъагъэх	Плъахэщ	Плъащ	They looked

The 3rd-person ма-/мэ- is a tense/aspect marker, not an agreement pronoun: it surfaces only when the absolutive slot is empty (standing as the verb's initial morpheme) and drops in the negative, in non-present tenses, and — in Adyghe — whenever the directional къэ- is added.

=== Number in modern Kabardian ===
Modern Kabardian does not mark a 3rd-person-plural subject on the verb: it uses the singular, with plurality on the free pronoun ахэр. "They look" is normally Ахэр маплъэ (singular маплъэ = "he looks"); the -хэ forms in the Proto-Kabardian column are the older, number-distinguishing ones.

3PL subject: Proto-Kabardian vs. Modern Kabardian
Proto- Kabardian	Plurals	Modern Kabardian	English
Маплъэхэ	3P ABS → 3S ABS	Маплъэ	they look
Плъахэщ	3P ABS → 3S ABS	Плъащ	they looked

== Monovalent Static Intransitive Verbs conjugation ==
A static (stative) intransitive verb describes a position or state — "sit", "stand", "lie" — rather than an action. Like the plain monovalent intransitive it has a single absolutive subject, but it takes no dynamic prefix in either language (no 3rd-person мэ-/ма-, no fused dynamic vowel elsewhere). Since the dynamic marker is what mainly separates present from past, here the two differ only by the tense suffix (present Ø; past Adyghe -гъ / Kabardian -ащ). The model verb is Adyghe щысын / Kabardian щысын "to sit" (щы- "at (a place)" + root -с "sit"), and each cell below gives a single form.

Static vs. dynamic monovalent (3rd person)
	dynamic, e.g. плъэн "look"	static, e.g. щысын "sit"
present	Маплъэ / Маплъэ (dynamic prefix)	Щыс / Щыс (no prefix)
past	Плъагъэ / Плъащ	Щысыгъ / Щысащ

In the slot template this is the leanest verb of all: just the absolutive subject and the root, with no directional and no dynamic marker. Present and past differ only by the tense suffix:

Slots used by щысын / щысын "to sit"
	ABS (subject)	Root (+ tense)
Adyghe — present	сы-, у-, тэ-, …	щыс
Adyghe — past	сы-, у-, тэ-, …	щыс + -ыгъ
Kabardian — present	сы-, у-, дэ-, …	щыс
Kabardian — past	сы-, у-, дэ-, …	щыс + -ащ

The three language columns are Modern Adyghe, Proto-Kabardian and Modern Kabardian. Adyghe is conservative, so one column suffices; Proto-Kabardian keeps the older number distinctions, while Modern Kabardian collapses every 3rd-person plural to the singular (number then resting on the free pronouns ахэр / абыхэм). The two Kabardian columns therefore differ only in the 3PL cells — see Number in modern Kabardian below for the exact forms.

Conjugation of щысын / щысын (to sit) — present and past tense
Config	Tense	Modern Adyghe	Proto- Kabardian	Modern Kabardian	English
Subject: 1st Person Singular — Ady Сэ / Kbd Сэ
Ady: Сэ; Kbd: Сэ	Pres.	Сыщыс	Сыщысщ	Сыщысщ	I sit
Ady: Сэ; Kbd: Сэ	Pst.	Сыщысыгъ	Сыщысащ	Сыщысащ	I sat
Subject: 1st Person Plural — Ady Тэ / Kbd Дэ
Ady: Тэ; Kbd: Дэ	Pres.	Тыщыс	Дыщысщ	Дыщысщ	We sit
Ady: Тэ; Kbd: Дэ	Pst.	Тыщысыгъ	Дыщысащ	Дыщысащ	We sat
Subject: 2nd Person Singular — Ady О / Kbd Уэ
Ady: О Kbd: Уэ	Pres.	Ущыс	Ущысщ	Ущысщ	You sit
Ady: О Kbd: Уэ	Pst.	Ущысыгъ	Ущысащ	Ущысащ	You sat
Subject: 2nd Person Plural — Ady Шъо / Kbd Фэ
Ady: Шъо; Kbd: Фэ	Pres.	Шъущыс	Фыщысщ	Фыщысщ	Y'all sit
Ady: Шъо; Kbd: Фэ	Pst.	Шъущысыгъ	Фыщысащ	Фыщысащ	Y'all sat
Subject: 3rd Person Singular (Person A) — Ady Ар / Kbd Ар
Ady: Ар; Kbd: Ар	Pres.	Щыс	Щысщ	Щысщ	He sits
Ady: Ар; Kbd: Ар	Pst.	Щысыгъ	Щысащ	Щысащ	He sat
Subject: 3rd Person Plural (Group A) — Ady Ахэр / Kbd Ахэр
Ady: Ахэр; Kbd: Ахэр	Pres.	Щысых	Щысхэщ	Щысщ	They sit
Ady: Ахэр; Kbd: Ахэр	Pst.	Щысыгъэх	Щысахэщ	Щысащ	They sat

=== Number in modern Kabardian ===
As in every class, modern Kabardian leaves a 3rd-person-plural subject unmarked on the verb, using the singular with the plural on the free pronoun ахэр: "they sit" is normally Ахэр щыс. The -хэ forms in the Proto-Kabardian column above are the older ones.

3PL subject: Proto-Kabardian vs. Modern Kabardian
Proto- Kabardian	Plurals	Modern Kabardian	English
Щысхэ	3P ABS → 3S ABS	Щыс	they sit
Щысахэщ	3P ABS → 3S ABS	Щысащ	they sat

== Bivalent Intransitive Verbs conjugation ==
An intransitive bivalent verb takes two arguments: an absolutive subject and an oblique object. It is still intransitive — the subject is absolutive, not ergative — but requires an obligatory oblique object. Both languages model it on еплъын / еплъын /japɬən/ "to look at".

One feature stands out:

- The two languages treat the 3rd-person oblique object differently. Adyghe keeps the old number distinction — е- "at him" vs я- "at them" — through the present; Kabardian collapses it, the dynamic -о- swallowing the 3rd-person object marker (Соплъ = "I look at him / at them").

This verb adds an OBL (object) slot to the monovalent skeleton; the directional sits between the subject and the object:

Slots used by еплъын / еплъын "to look at"
	ABS (subject)	CIS (directional)	OBL (object)	DYN (present)	Root (+ tense)
Adyghe — present	сы-, у-, …	(къы-)	с-, о-, е-/я-, …	-э-	плъы
Adyghe — past	(same)	(къы-)	(same)	—	плъы + -гъ
Kabardian — present	сы-, у-, …	(къы-)	з-, у-, ø, …	-о-	плъ
Kabardian — past	(same)	(къы-)	з-, у-, е-, …	—	плъ + -ащ

Worked examples — Adyghe:

- Сыоплъы — I look at you (сы- + о- + э- + плъы)
- Укъысэплъы — You look at me (у- + къы- + сэ- + э- + плъы)

Worked examples — Kabardian:

- Соплъ — I look at him (с- + о- + плъ)
- Укъызоплъ — You look at me (у- + къы- + з- + о- + плъ)

The three language columns are Modern Adyghe, Proto-Kabardian and Modern Kabardian. Adyghe is conservative, so one column suffices. Proto-Kabardian keeps every number distinction; Modern Kabardian collapses every 3rd-person plural — subject and object — to the singular, leaving number on the free pronouns ахэр / абыхэм. The two Kabardian columns therefore diverge in just two places: the 3PL-subject rows (Йоплъхэ → Йоплъ), and the past "at them" rows, where Proto-Kabardian restores the 3PL-oblique а-/я- (Саплъащ "I looked at them") that Modern Kabardian leaves syncretic with "at him" (Сеплъащ). In the present the dynamic -о- swallows the 3PL object, so "at them" and "at him" coincide (Соплъ) in both columns — the distinction surfaces only in the past.

Conjugation of еплъын / еплъын (to look at) — present and past tense
Config	Tense	Modern Adyghe	Proto- Kabardian	Modern Kabardian	English
Subject: 1st Person Singular — Ady Сэ / Kbd Сэ
Ady: Сэ О Kbd: Сэ Уэ	Pres.	Сыоплъы	Сыноплъ	Сыноплъ	I look at you
Ady: Сэ О Kbd: Сэ Уэ	Pst.	Сыоплъгъ	Сыноплъащ	Сыноплъащ	I looked at you
Ady: Сэ Шъо; Kbd: Сэ Фэ	Pres.	Сышъоплъы	Сынывоплъ	Сынывоплъ	I look at y'all
Ady: Сэ Шъо; Kbd: Сэ Фэ	Pst.	Сышъоплъгъ	Сынывэплъащ	Сынывэплъащ	I looked at y'all
Ady: Сэ Ащ; Kbd: Сэ Абы	Pres.	Сеплъы	Соплъ	Соплъ	I look at him
Ady: Сэ Ащ; Kbd: Сэ Абы	Pst.	Сеплъгъ	Сеплъащ	Сеплъащ	I looked at him
Ady: Сэ Ахэмэ; Kbd: Сэ Абыхэм	Pres.	Саплъы	Соплъ	Соплъ	I look at them
Ady: Сэ Ахэмэ; Kbd: Сэ Абыхэм	Pst.	Саплъгъ	Саплъащ	Сеплъащ	I looked at them
Subject: 1st Person Plural — Ady Тэ / Kbd Дэ
Ady: Тэ О Kbd: Дэ Уэ	Pres.	Тыоплъы	Дыноплъ	Дыноплъ	We look at you
Ady: Тэ О Kbd: Дэ Уэ	Pst.	Тыоплъгъ	Дыноплъащ	Дыноплъащ	We looked at you
Ady: Тэ Шъо; Kbd: Дэ Фэ	Pres.	Тышъоплъы	Дынывоплъ	Дынывоплъ	We look at y'all
Ady: Тэ Шъо; Kbd: Дэ Фэ	Pst.	Тышъоплъгъ	Дынывэплъащ	Дынывэплъащ	We looked at y'all
Ady: Тэ Ащ; Kbd: Дэ Абы	Pres.	Теплъы	Доплъ	Доплъ	We look at him
Ady: Тэ Ащ; Kbd: Дэ Абы	Pst.	Теплъгъ	Деплъащ	Деплъащ	We looked at him
Ady: Тэ Ахэмэ; Kbd: Дэ Абыхэм	Pres.	Таплъы	Доплъ	Доплъ	We look at them
Ady: Тэ Ахэмэ; Kbd: Дэ Абыхэм	Pst.	Таплъгъ	Даплъащ	Деплъащ	We looked at them
Subject: 2nd Person Singular — Ady О / Kbd Уэ
Ady: О Сэ; Kbd: Уэ Сэ	Pres.	Укъысэплъы	Укъызоплъ	Укъызоплъ	You look at me
Ady: О Сэ; Kbd: Уэ Сэ	Pst.	Укъысэплъгъ	Укъызэплъащ	Укъызэплъащ	You looked at me
Ady: О Тэ; Kbd: Уэ Дэ	Pres.	Укъытэплъы	Укъыдоплъ	Укъыдоплъ	You look at us
Ady: О Тэ; Kbd: Уэ Дэ	Pst.	Укъытэплъгъ	Укъыдэплъащ	Укъыдэплъащ	You looked at us
Ady: О Ащ; Kbd: Уэ Абы	Pres.	Уеплъы	Уоплъ	Уоплъ	You look at him
Ady: О Ащ; Kbd: Уэ Абы	Pst.	Уеплъгъ	Уеплъащ	Уеплъащ	You looked at him
Ady: О Ахэмэ; Kbd: Уэ Абыхэм	Pres.	Уаплъы	Уоплъ	Уоплъ	You look at them
Ady: О Ахэмэ; Kbd: Уэ Абыхэм	Pst.	Уаплъгъ	Уаплъащ	Уеплъащ	You looked at them
Subject: 2nd Person Plural — Ady Шъо / Kbd Фэ
Ady: Шъо Сэ; Kbd: Фэ Сэ	Pres.	Шъукъысэплъы	Фыкъызоплъ	Фыкъызоплъ	Y'all look at me
Ady: Шъо Сэ; Kbd: Фэ Сэ	Pst.	Шъукъысэплъгъ	Фыкъызэплъащ	Фыкъызэплъащ	Y'all looked at me
Ady: Шъо Тэ; Kbd: Фэ Дэ	Pres.	Шъукъытэплъы	Фыкъыдоплъ	Фыкъыдоплъ	Y'all look at us
Ady: Шъо Тэ; Kbd: Фэ Дэ	Pst.	Шъукъытэплъгъ	Фыкъыдэплъащ	Фыкъыдэплъащ	Y'all looked at us
Ady: Шъо Ащ; Kbd: Фэ Абы	Pres.	Шъуеплъы	Фоплъ	Фоплъ	Y'all look at him
Ady: Шъо Ащ; Kbd: Фэ Абы	Pst.	Шъуеплъгъ	Феплъащ	Феплъащ	Y'all looked at him
Ady: Шъо Ахэмэ; Kbd: Фэ Абыхэм	Pres.	Шъуаплъы	Фоплъ	Фоплъ	Y'all look at them
Ady: Шъо Ахэмэ; Kbd: Фэ Абыхэм	Pst.	Шъуаплъгъ	Фаплъащ	Феплъащ	Y'all looked at them
Subject: 3rd Person Singular (Person A) — Ady Ар / Kbd Ар
Ady: Ар Сэ; Kbd: Ар Сэ	Pres.	Къысэплъы	Къызоплъ	Къызоплъ	He looks at me
Ady: Ар Сэ; Kbd: Ар Сэ	Pst.	Къысэплъгъ	Къызэплъащ	Къызэплъащ	He looked at me
Ady: Ар Тэ; Kbd: Ар Дэ	Pres.	Къытэплъы	Къыдоплъ	Къыдоплъ	He looks at us
Ady: Ар Тэ; Kbd: Ар Дэ	Pst.	Къытэплъгъ	Къыдэплъащ	Къыдэплъащ	He looked at us
Ady: Ар О Kbd: Ар Уэ	Pres.	Къыоплъы	Къоплъ	Къоплъ	He looks at you
Ady: Ар О Kbd: Ар Уэ	Pst.	Къыоплъгъ	Къоплъащ	Къоплъащ	He looked at you
Ady: Ар Шъо; Kbd: Ар Фэ	Pres.	Къышъоплъы	Къывоплъ	Къывоплъ	He looks at y'all
Ady: Ар Шъо; Kbd: Ар Фэ	Pst.	Къышъоплъгъ	Къывэплъащ	Къывэплъащ	He looked at y'all
Ady: Ар Ащ; Kbd: Ар Абы	Pres.	Еплъы	Йоплъ	Йоплъ	He looks at him
Ady: Ар Ащ; Kbd: Ар Абы	Pst.	Еплъгъ	Еплъащ	Еплъащ	He looked at him
Ady: Ар Ахэмэ; Kbd: Ар Абыхэм	Pres.	Аплъы	Йоплъ	Йоплъ	He looks at them
Ady: Ар Ахэмэ; Kbd: Ар Абыхэм	Pst.	Аплъгъ	Яплъащ	Еплъащ	He looked at them
Subject: 3rd Person Plural (Group A) — Ady Ахэр / Kbd Ахэр
Ady: Ахэр Сэ; Kbd: Ахэр Сэ	Pres.	Къысэплъых	Къызоплъыхэ	Къызоплъ	They look at me
Ady: Ахэр Сэ; Kbd: Ахэр Сэ	Pst.	Къысэплъгъэх	Къызэплъахэщ	Къызэплъащ	They looked at me
Ady: Ахэр Тэ; Kbd: Ахэр Дэ	Pres.	Къытэплъых	Къыдоплъыхэ	Къыдоплъ	They look at us
Ady: Ахэр Тэ; Kbd: Ахэр Дэ	Pst.	Къытэплъгъэх	Къыдэплъахэщ	Къыдэплъащ	They looked at us
Ady: Ахэр О Kbd: Ахэр Уэ	Pres.	Къыоплъых	Къоплъыхэ	Къоплъ	They look at you
Ady: Ахэр О Kbd: Ахэр Уэ	Pst.	Къыоплъгъэх	Къоплъахэщ	Къоплъащ	They looked at you
Ady: Ахэр Шъо; Kbd: Ахэр Фэ	Pres.	Къышъоплъых	Къывоплъыхэ	Къывоплъ	They look at y'all
Ady: Ахэр Шъо; Kbd: Ахэр Фэ	Pst.	Къышъоплъгъэх	Къывэплъахэщ	Къывэплъащ	They looked at y'all
Ady: Ахэр Ащ; Kbd: Ахэр Абы	Pres.	Еплъых	Йоплъыхэ	Йоплъ	They look at him
Ady: Ахэр Ащ; Kbd: Ахэр Абы	Pst.	Еплъгъэх	Еплъахэщ	Еплъащ	They looked at him
Ady: Ахэр Ахэмэ; Kbd: Ахэр Абыхэм	Pres.	Аплъых	Йоплъыхэ	Йоплъ	They look at them
Ady: Ахэр Ахэмэ; Kbd: Ахэр Абыхэм	Pst.	Аплъгъэх	Яплъахэщ	Еплъащ	They looked at them

=== Third-person oblique object: Adyghe е-/я- vs Kabardian collapse ===
The third-person oblique markers differ by tense and number — the source of the present-tense gap between the two languages:

Table 4.3. Markers of the third-person indirect (oblique) object
	Adyghe (oblique object)		Kabardian (oblique object)	
	Present	Other tenses	Present	Other tenses
3SG	je (е)	je (е)	ø (—)	je (е)
3PL	ja (я)	je (е)	ø (—)	je (е)

In Kabardian the 3rd-person oblique object has no overt marker in the present: the prefixes е- and я- were assimilated and lost before the dynamic о- (уэ-). In the other tenses (no dynamic prefix) the object is marked е- in both numbers. Number-distinguishing forms like д-е-у-а-щ "we hit him" vs д-я-у-а-щ "we hit them" are possible but uncommon — modern Kabardian carries number on a free pronoun (дэ абыхэм деуащ "we hit them"), leaving the present syncretic: one form can mean "he/they looked at him/at them".

Adyghe keeps the distinction: е-плъы "he looked at him" vs я-плъы "he looked at them", plus the later plural -х (е-плъы-х "they looked at him", я-плъы-х "they looked at them") — a retention tied to the absence of the dynamic о- (уэ-) in the Adyghe present.

For example, еджэн "to read" (oblique е- sg / я- pl, no spatial preverb) forms "I read them" as сяджащ (с-я-дж-а-щ), built like its variant саджащ (с-а-дж-а-щ); both are 3PL-oblique forms but are avoided, with plurality on a free pronoun (абыхэм / тхылъыхэм). Likewise дэлэжьэн "to work (with)": the plural-oblique сэ ахэм садэлэжьащ "I worked with them" is uncommon — today сэ ахэм сыдэлэжьащ is used, the verb staying singular with the plural on ахэм.

=== Verbs with spatial preverbs: preserving the 3PL object ===
Verbs with spatial preverbs (пэ-, хэ-, те-) keep the 3SG/3PL distinction the standard verbs lose: the preverb sits between the object prefix and the dynamic vowel, so the 3PL oblique а- stays visible:

- Абыхэм щӀалэр къапоплъэ. — "The boy is waiting for them." (directional къ- + 3PL object а- + preverb пэ- + dynamic -о- + root плъэ). Contrast 3SG къыпоплъэ ("waiting for him").
- Сэ абыхэм сахоплъэ. — "I look among them." (сы-а-х-о-плъэ : 1SG сы- + 3PL а- + preverb хэ- + dynamic -о- + root плъэ).
- Си ӀуэхукӀэ сэ унащхьэхэм сатоплъэ. — "Because of my business, I look upon the roofs." (сы-а-т-о-плъэ : preverb те- drops its vowel to т-).

In modern Kabardian even these number-distinguishing 3PL forms (къапоплъэ, сахоплъэ, сатоплъэ) are uncommon; in practice the verb is left number-neutral (къыпоплъэ, сыхоплъэ, сытоплъэ), with plurality on the free pronoun (абыхэм).

=== Additional examples ===
The root -джэ- "to read/study" in context:

- Соджэ — "I read / I am studying" (с-о-джэ)
- Йоджэ — "He reads / He is studying" (й-о-джэ)
- ЩӀалэр тхылъым йоджэ. — "The boy reads the book." (subject щӀалэр absolutive, object тхылъым oblique).
- Сэ тхылъым соджэ. — "I read the book."
- ЗыгуэркӀэ сыноупщӀмэ, жэуап пэжыр псынщӀу къызот. — "If I ask you about something, you quickly give me the true answer."
  - No dynamic -о- in conditionals: the conditional suffix -мэ ("if") strips the dynamic -о-. The "о" in сыноупщӀмэ is not the dynamic prefix; it is the contraction of the 2SG object pronoun уэ (сы-ны-уэ-упщӀ-мэ). Switching the object to 2PL (вэ) gives сынывэупщӀмэ ("if I ask y'all"), where the "о" vanishes.

Telling the dynamic о- apart from the 2nd-person pronoun уэ. In the past there is no dynamic о-. Compare:

- Сыноплъащ "I looked at you" ← Сы-ны-уэ-плъ-ащ.
- Къоплъащ "He looked at you" ← Къы-уэ-плъ-ащ.

Replacing "you" with "me" (1SG сэ-) or "y'all" (2PL вэ-) makes the о disappear, revealing the true past structure:

- Къызэплъащ "He looked at me"
- Сынывэплъащ "I looked at y'all"
- Къывэплъащ "He looked at y'all"

Past / spatial contexts:

- Си гъусэу унежьэмэ, зыкӀи укъызэмыупщӀ. — "If you set out with me, do not ask me anything at all." (negative imperative: у-къы-зэ-мы-упщӀ).
- ЦӀыхухэм сахэплъащ. — "I looked among the people." (сы-а-хэ-плъ-а-щ, keeping the 3PL prefix а- with the хэ- preverb).
- Сэ нобэ жылэм и унащӀэхэм сарихьащ скъаплъынущ. — "Today I entered the village's new houses, I will look at them." (past сарихьащ [сы-а-ры-хь-а-щ] + future скъаплъынущ [сы-къ-а-плъ-ын-у-щ]).

=== Number in modern Kabardian ===
Two separate collapses set Modern Kabardian apart from Proto-Kabardian, and the two columns in the table above differ only where one of them applies:

- 3PL absolutive subject ("they …"). Modern Kabardian drops the plural -хэ and reuses the singular form, with number carried by the free pronoun ахэр: present Йоплъхэ → Йоплъ, past Еплъахэщ → Еплъащ (and Къызэплъахэщ → Къызэплъащ).
- 3PL oblique object ("… at them"). In the present the dynamic -о- has already swallowed the object marker, so "at them" and "at him" are identical (Соплъ) in both columns — there is nothing left to collapse. The difference appears only in the past, where Proto-Kabardian keeps the plural а-/я- (Саплъащ "I looked at them") and Modern Kabardian falls back on the singular (Сеплъащ), leaning on абыхэм for number.

When a cell is both 3PL-subject and 3PL-object ("they looked at them"), both collapses fire at once: Proto Яплъахэщ → Modern Еплъащ.

Proto-Kabardian vs. Modern Kabardian — where (and when) the two diverge
What collapses	Tense	Proto- Kabardian	Modern Kabardian	English
3PL subject	Pres.	Йоплъхэ	Йоплъ	they look at him
3PL subject	Pst.	Еплъахэщ	Еплъащ	they looked at him
3PL oblique	Pres.	Соплъ	Соплъ	I look at them (= "at him")
3PL oblique	Pst.	Саплъащ	Сеплъащ	I looked at them
both subject + oblique	Pst.	Яплъахэщ	Еплъащ	they looked at them

=== Adyghe Variants ===
Held back from the main table is the Adyghe я-series for a 3PL oblique object: beside the default а-, Adyghe has an older я- (Саплъы ~ Сяплъы "I look at them"). (Kabardian has no variant of its own — its present already collapses 3SG/3PL.)

Adyghe variants — 3PL-oblique-object я-series
config ABS-OBL	Tense	Adyghe Standard	Adyghe Variants	English
Ady: Сэ ахэмэ Kbd: Сэ абыхэм	Pres.	Саплъы	Сяплъы	I look at them
Ady: Сэ ахэмэ Kbd: Сэ абыхэм	Pst.	Саплъыгъ	Сяплъыгъ	I looked at them
Ady: О ахэмэ Kbd: Уэ абыхэм	Pres.	Уаплъы	Уяплъы	You look at them
Ady: О ахэмэ Kbd: Уэ абыхэм	Pst.	Уаплъыгъ	Уяплъыгъ	You looked at them
Ady: Ар ахэмэ Kbd: Ар абыхэм	Pres.	Аплъы	Яплъы	He looks at them
Ady: Ар ахэмэ Kbd: Ар абыхэм	Pst.	Аплъыгъ	Яплъыгъ	He looked at them
Ady: Тэ ахэмэ Kbd: Дэ абыхэм	Pres.	Таплъы	Тяплъы	We look at them
Ady: Тэ ахэмэ Kbd: Дэ абыхэм	Pst.	Таплъыгъ	Тяплъыгъ	We looked at them
Ady: Шъо ахэмэ Kbd: Фэ абыхэм	Pres.	Шъуаплъы	Шъуяплъы	Y'all look at them
Ady: Шъо ахэмэ Kbd: Фэ абыхэм	Pst.	Шъуаплъыгъ	Шъуяплъыгъ	Y'all looked at them
Ady: Ахэр ахэмэ Kbd: Ахэр абыхэм	Pres.	Аплъых	Яплъых	They look at them
Ady: Ахэр ахэмэ Kbd: Ахэр абыхэм	Pst.	Аплъыгъэх	Яплъыгъэх	They looked at them

== Bivalent Intransitive Reflexive Verbs conjugation ==
When the subject and oblique object of a bivalent intransitive verb refer to the same participant, the verb is reflexive. The oblique (object) slot takes a reflexive prefix instead of a person prefix, the verb adds a refactive ("back-to-self") suffix, and the absolutive subject prefix is kept as usual; everything else matches the plain verb. (In the transitive reflexive it is the front absolutive slot that is reflexivised instead.)

The two languages differ only in the shape of the reflexive prefix and the refactive suffix:

Reflexive prefix and refactive suffix
	Reflexive prefix	Refactive suffix	"I look at myself"
Adyghe	зэ- (both tenses)	-жьы	Сызэплъыжьы
Kabardian	з- (Pres) / зэ- (Past)	-ыж (→ -ыжащ in the past)	Сызоплъыж

The reflexive prefix зэ-/з- simply fills the OBL (object) slot of the plain bivalent verb, and the refactive ("back-to-self") suffix Adyghe -жьы / Kabardian -ж attaches to the root:

Slots used by reflexive еплъын / еплъын "to look at oneself"
	ABS (subject)	CIS (directional)	OBL (reflexive)	DYN (present)	Root + refactive (+ tense)
Adyghe — present	сы-, у-, …	(къы-)	зэ-	-э-	плъыжьы
Adyghe — past	(same)	(къы-)	зэ-	—	плъыжьы + -гъ
Kabardian — present	сы-, у-, …	(къы-)	з-	-о-	плъыж
Kabardian — past	(same)	(къы-)	зэ-	—	плъыж + -ащ

Worked examples — Adyghe:

- Сызэплъыжьы — I look at myself (сы- + зэ- + э- + плъы-жьы)
- Укъызэплъыжьы — You look at yourself (у- + къы- + зэ- + э- + плъы-жьы)

Worked examples — Kabardian:

- Сызоплъыж — I look at myself (сы- + з- + о- + плъ-ыж)
- Укъызэплъыжащ — You looked at yourself (у- + къы- + зэ- + плъ-ыж + ащ)

Points to note:

- The plural -х / -хэ appears only when the absolutive (subject) is plural; the oblique simply mirrors the subject.
- Because the oblique is always the reflexive, all six paradigms share one stem (зэплъыжьы / зоплъыж ~ зэплъыжащ), differing only in the subject prefix and plural suffix.
- The free-phrase column uses the 3rd-person reflexive pronoun Adyghe ежь (pl. ежьхэмэ) / Kabardian езым (pl. езыхэм), and a repeated personal pronoun (сэ сэ / сэ сэ) for the 1st and 2nd persons.

The three language columns are Modern Adyghe, Proto-Kabardian and Modern Kabardian. Adyghe is conservative, so one column suffices; Proto-Kabardian keeps the older number distinctions, while Modern Kabardian collapses every 3rd-person plural to the singular (number then resting on the free pronouns ахэр / абыхэм). The two Kabardian columns therefore differ only in the 3PL cells — see Number in modern Kabardian below for the exact forms.

Conjugation of еплъын / еплъын (to look at) — present and past tense
Config	Tense	Modern Adyghe	Proto- Kabardian	Modern Kabardian	English
Subject: 1st Person Singular — Ady Сэ / Kbd Сэ
Ady: Сэ Сэ; Kbd: Сэ Сэ	Pres.	Сызэплъыжьы	Сызоплъыж	Сызоплъыж	I look at myself
Ady: Сэ Сэ; Kbd: Сэ Сэ	Pst.	Сызэплъыжьыгъ	Сызэплъыжащ	Сызэплъыжащ	I looked at myself
Subject: 1st Person Plural — Ady Тэ / Kbd Дэ
Ady: Тэ Тэ; Kbd: Дэ Дэ	Pres.	Тызэплъыжьы	Дызоплъыж	Дызоплъыж	We look at ourselves
Ady: Тэ Тэ; Kbd: Дэ Дэ	Pst.	Тызэплъыжьыгъ	Дызэплъыжащ	Дызэплъыжащ	We looked at ourselves
Subject: 2nd Person Singular — Ady О / Kbd Уэ
Ady: О О Kbd: Уэ Уэ	Pres.	Узэплъыжьы	Узоплъыж	Узоплъыж	You look at yourself
Ady: О О Kbd: Уэ Уэ	Pst.	Узэплъыжьыгъ	Узэплъыжащ	Узэплъыжащ	You looked at yourself
Subject: 2nd Person Plural — Ady Шъо / Kbd Фэ
Ady: Шъо Шъо; Kbd: Фэ Фэ	Pres.	Шъузэплъыжьы	Фызоплъыж	Фызоплъыж	Y'all look at yourselves
Ady: Шъо Шъо; Kbd: Фэ Фэ	Pst.	Шъузэплъыжьыгъ	Фызэплъыжащ	Фызэплъыжащ	Y'all looked at yourselves
Subject: 3rd Person Singular (Person A) — Ady Ар / Kbd Ар
Ady: Ар Ащ; Kbd: Ар Абы	Pres.	Зэплъыжьы	Зоплъыж	Зоплъыж	He looks at himself
Ady: Ар Ащ; Kbd: Ар Абы	Pst.	Зэплъыжьыгъ	Зэплъыжащ	Зэплъыжащ	He looked at himself
Subject: 3rd Person Plural (Group A) — Ady Ахэр / Kbd Ахэр
Ady: Ахэр Ахэмэ; Kbd: Ахэр Абыхэм	Pres.	Зэплъыжьых	Зоплъыжхэ	Зоплъыж	They look at themselves
Ady: Ахэр Ахэмэ; Kbd: Ахэр Абыхэм	Pst.	Зэплъыжьыгъэх	Зэплъыжахэщ	Зэплъыжащ	They looked at themselves

=== Number in modern Kabardian ===
Modern Kabardian leaves the 3rd-person-plural subject unmarked: "they look at themselves" is normally Ахэр езыхэм зоплъыж, with the singular зоплъыж and plurality on the free pronoun ахэр. The -хэ forms in the Proto-Kabardian column above are the older, number-distinguishing ones.

3PL subject: Proto-Kabardian vs. Modern Kabardian
Proto- Kabardian	Plurals	Modern Kabardian	English
Зоплъыжхэ	3P ABS → 3S ABS	Зоплъыж	they look at themselves
Зэплъыжахэщ	3P ABS → 3S ABS	Зэплъыжащ	they looked at themselves

== Bivalent Static Intransitive Verbs conjugation ==
A bivalent static intransitive verb adds an oblique object to a static intransitive. Like the dynamic bivalent еплъын "look at", it has an absolutive subject and an oblique object and the same prefix slots. But, being static, it takes no dynamic prefix, so (as with the monovalent static) the present and past differ only by the tense suffix. The model verb is Adyghe тесын / Kabardian тесын "to sit on (something)" (те- "on (a surface)" + root -с "sit").

The slots are the same as the dynamic bivalent еплъын, but with no DYN column — present and past differ only by the tense suffix (the те- "on" is a fixed part of the stem, not a person slot):

Slots used by тесын / тесын "to sit on"
	ABS (subject)	CIS (directional)	OBL (object)	Root (+ tense)
Adyghe — present	сы-, у-, …	(къы-)	п-, с-, а-, …	тес
Adyghe — past	(same)	(къы-)	(same)	тес + -ыгъ
Kabardian — present	сы-, у-, …	(къы-)	п-, с-, а-, …	тес
Kabardian — past	(same)	(къы-)	(same)	тес + -ащ

Worked examples (present = past minus the tense suffix):

- Сытес / Сытес — I sit on him (сы- + те- + с); past Сытесыгъ / Сытесащ
- Сыптес / Сыптес — I sit on you (сы- + п- + те- + с)
- Укъыстес / Укъыстес — you sit on me (у- + къы- + с- + те- + с)

The three language columns are Modern Adyghe, Proto-Kabardian and Modern Kabardian. Adyghe is conservative, so one column suffices; Proto-Kabardian keeps the older number distinctions, while Modern Kabardian collapses every 3rd-person plural to the singular (number then resting on the free pronouns ахэр / абыхэм). The two Kabardian columns therefore differ only in the 3PL cells — see Number in modern Kabardian below for the exact forms.

Conjugation of тесын / тесын (to sit on) — present and past tense
Config	Tense	Modern Adyghe	Proto- Kabardian	Modern Kabardian	English
Subject: 1st Person Singular — Ady Сэ / Kbd Сэ
Ady: Сэ О Kbd: Сэ Уэ	Pres.	Сыптес	Сыптесщ	Сыптесщ	I sit on you
Ady: Сэ О Kbd: Сэ Уэ	Pst.	Сыптесыгъ	Сыптесащ	Сыптесащ	I sat on you
Ady: Сэ Шъо; Kbd: Сэ Фэ	Pres.	Сышъутес	Сыфтесщ	Сыфтесщ	I sit on y'all
Ady: Сэ Шъо; Kbd: Сэ Фэ	Pst.	Сышъутесыгъ	Сыфтесащ	Сыфтесащ	I sat on y'all
Ady: Сэ Ащ; Kbd: Сэ Абы	Pres.	Сытес	Сытесщ	Сытесщ	I sit on him
Ady: Сэ Ащ; Kbd: Сэ Абы	Pst.	Сытесыгъ	Сытесащ	Сытесащ	I sat on him
Ady: Сэ Ахэмэ; Kbd: Сэ Абыхэм	Pres.	Сатес	Сатесщ	Сытесщ	I sit on them
Ady: Сэ Ахэмэ; Kbd: Сэ Абыхэм	Pst.	Сатесыгъ	Сатесащ	Сытесащ	I sat on them
Subject: 1st Person Plural — Ady Тэ / Kbd Дэ
Ady: Тэ О Kbd: Дэ Уэ	Pres.	Тыптес	Дыптесщ	Дыптесщ	We sit on you
Ady: Тэ О Kbd: Дэ Уэ	Pst.	Тыптесыгъ	Дыптесащ	Дыптесащ	We sat on you
Ady: Тэ Шъо; Kbd: Дэ Фэ	Pres.	Тышъутес	Дыфтесщ	Дыфтесщ	We sit on y'all
Ady: Тэ Шъо; Kbd: Дэ Фэ	Pst.	Тышъутесыгъ	Дыфтесащ	Дыфтесащ	We sat on y'all
Ady: Тэ Ащ; Kbd: Дэ Абы	Pres.	Тытес	Дытесщ	Дытесщ	We sit on him
Ady: Тэ Ащ; Kbd: Дэ Абы	Pst.	Тытесыгъ	Дытесащ	Дытесащ	We sat on him
Ady: Тэ Ахэмэ; Kbd: Дэ Абыхэм	Pres.	Татес	Датесщ	Дытесщ	We sit on them
Ady: Тэ Ахэмэ; Kbd: Дэ Абыхэм	Pst.	Татесыгъ	Датесащ	Дытесащ	We sat on them
Subject: 2nd Person Singular — Ady О / Kbd Уэ
Ady: О Сэ; Kbd: Уэ Сэ	Pres.	Укъыстес	Укъыстесщ	Укъыстесщ	You sit on me
Ady: О Сэ; Kbd: Уэ Сэ	Pst.	Укъыстесыгъ	Укъыстесащ	Укъыстесащ	You sat on me
Ady: О Тэ; Kbd: Уэ Дэ	Pres.	Укъыттес	Укъыдтесщ	Укъыдтесщ	You sit on us
Ady: О Тэ; Kbd: Уэ Дэ	Pst.	Укъыттесыгъ	Укъыдтесащ	Укъыдтесащ	You sat on us
Ady: О Ащ; Kbd: Уэ Абы	Pres.	Утес	Утесщ	Утесщ	You sit on him
Ady: О Ащ; Kbd: Уэ Абы	Pst.	Утесыгъ	Утесащ	Утесащ	You sat on him
Ady: О Ахэмэ; Kbd: Уэ Абыхэм	Pres.	Уатес	Уатесщ	Утесщ	You sit on them
Ady: О Ахэмэ; Kbd: Уэ Абыхэм	Pst.	Уатесыгъ	Уатесащ	Утесащ	You sat on them
Subject: 2nd Person Plural — Ady Шъо / Kbd Фэ
Ady: Шъо Сэ; Kbd: Фэ Сэ	Pres.	Шъукъыстес	Фыкъыстесщ	Фыкъыстесщ	Y'all sit on me
Ady: Шъо Сэ; Kbd: Фэ Сэ	Pst.	Шъукъыстесыгъ	Фыкъыстесащ	Фыкъыстесащ	Y'all sat on me
Ady: Шъо Тэ; Kbd: Фэ Дэ	Pres.	Шъукъыттес	Фыкъыдтесщ	Фыкъыдтесщ	Y'all sit on us
Ady: Шъо Тэ; Kbd: Фэ Дэ	Pst.	Шъукъыттесыгъ	Фыкъыдтесащ	Фыкъыдтесащ	Y'all sat on us
Ady: Шъо Ащ; Kbd: Фэ Абы	Pres.	Шъутес	Фытесщ	Фытесщ	Y'all sit on him
Ady: Шъо Ащ; Kbd: Фэ Абы	Pst.	Шъутесыгъ	Фытесащ	Фытесащ	Y'all sat on him
Ady: Шъо Ахэмэ; Kbd: Фэ Абыхэм	Pres.	Шъуатес	Фатесщ	Фытесщ	Y'all sit on them
Ady: Шъо Ахэмэ; Kbd: Фэ Абыхэм	Pst.	Шъуатесыгъ	Фатесащ	Фытесащ	Y'all sat on them
Subject: 3rd Person Singular (Person A) — Ady Ар / Kbd Ар
Ady: Ар Сэ; Kbd: Ар Сэ	Pres.	Къыстес	Къыстесщ	Къыстесщ	He sits on me
Ady: Ар Сэ; Kbd: Ар Сэ	Pst.	Къыстесыгъ	Къыстесащ	Къыстесащ	He sat on me
Ady: Ар Тэ; Kbd: Ар Дэ	Pres.	Къыттес	Къыдтесщ	Къыдтесщ	He sits on us
Ady: Ар Тэ; Kbd: Ар Дэ	Pst.	Къыттесыгъ	Къыдтесащ	Къыдтесащ	He sat on us
Ady: Ар О Kbd: Ар Уэ	Pres.	Къыптес	Къыптесщ	Къыптесщ	He sits on you
Ady: Ар О Kbd: Ар Уэ	Pst.	Къыптесыгъ	Къыптесащ	Къыптесащ	He sat on you
Ady: Ар Шъо; Kbd: Ар Фэ	Pres.	Къышъутес	Къыфтесщ	Къыфтесщ	He sits on y'all
Ady: Ар Шъо; Kbd: Ар Фэ	Pst.	Къышъутесыгъ	Къыфтесащ	Къыфтесащ	He sat on y'all
Ady: Ар Ащ; Kbd: Ар Абы	Pres.	Тес	Тесщ	Тесщ	He sits on him
Ady: Ар Ащ; Kbd: Ар Абы	Pst.	Тесыгъ	Тесащ	Тесащ	He sat on him
Ady: Ар Ахэмэ; Kbd: Ар Абыхэм	Pres.	Атес	Ятесщ	Тесщ	He sits on them
Ady: Ар Ахэмэ; Kbd: Ар Абыхэм	Pst.	Атесыгъ	Ятесащ	Тесащ	He sat on them
Subject: 3rd Person Plural (Group A) — Ady Ахэр / Kbd Ахэр
Ady: Ахэр Сэ; Kbd: Ахэр Сэ	Pres.	Къыстесых	Къыстесыхэщ	Къыстесщ	They sit on me
Ady: Ахэр Сэ; Kbd: Ахэр Сэ	Pst.	Къыстесыгъэх	Къыстесахэщ	Къыстесащ	They sat on me
Ady: Ахэр Тэ; Kbd: Ахэр Дэ	Pres.	Къыттесых	Къыдтесыхэщ	Къыдтесщ	They sit on us
Ady: Ахэр Тэ; Kbd: Ахэр Дэ	Pst.	Къыттесыгъэх	Къыдтесахэщ	Къыдтесащ	They sat on us
Ady: Ахэр О Kbd: Ахэр Уэ	Pres.	Къыптесых	Къыптесыхэщ	Къыптесщ	They sit on you
Ady: Ахэр О Kbd: Ахэр Уэ	Pst.	Къыптесыгъэх	Къыптесахэщ	Къыптесащ	They sat on you
Ady: Ахэр Шъо; Kbd: Ахэр Фэ	Pres.	Къышъутесых	Къыфтесыхэщ	Къыфтесщ	They sit on y'all
Ady: Ахэр Шъо; Kbd: Ахэр Фэ	Pst.	Къышъутесыгъэх	Къыфтесахэщ	Къыфтесащ	They sat on y'all
Ady: Ахэр Ащ; Kbd: Ахэр Абы	Pres.	Тесых	Тесыхэщ	Тесщ	They sit on him
Ady: Ахэр Ащ; Kbd: Ахэр Абы	Pst.	Тесыгъэх	Тесахэщ	Тесащ	They sat on him
Ady: Ахэр Ахэмэ; Kbd: Ахэр Абыхэм	Pres.	Атесых	Ятесыхэщ	Тесщ	They sit on them
Ady: Ахэр Ахэмэ; Kbd: Ахэр Абыхэм	Pst.	Атесыгъэх	Ятесахэщ	Тесащ	They sat on them

=== Number in modern Kabardian ===
As elsewhere, modern Kabardian leaves a 3rd-person plural unmarked, using the singular with the plural on the free pronoun (ахэр / абыхэм). The -хэ forms in the Proto-Kabardian column above are the older ones.

3PL subject: Proto-Kabardian vs. Modern Kabardian
Proto- Kabardian	Plurals	Modern Kabardian	English
Тесыхэ	3P ABS → 3S ABS	Тес	they sit on him
Тесахэщ	3P ABS → 3S ABS	Тесащ	they sat on him

=== Reflexive ===
Conjugation of тесын / тесын (to sit on) — present and past tense
Config	Tense	Modern Adyghe	Proto- Kabardian	Modern Kabardian	English
Subject: 1st Person Singular — Ady Сэ / Kbd Сэ
Ady: Сэ Сэ; Kbd: Сэ Сэ	Pres.	Сызэтесыжьы	Сызэтесыжщ	Сызэтесыжщ	I sit on myself
Ady: Сэ Сэ; Kbd: Сэ Сэ	Pst.	Сызэтесыжьыгъ	Сызэтесыжащ	Сызэтесыжащ	I sat on myself
Subject: 1st Person Plural — Ady Тэ / Kbd Дэ
Ady: Тэ Тэ; Kbd: Дэ Дэ	Pres.	Тызэтесыжьы	Дызэтесыжщ	Дызэтесыжщ	We sit on ourselves
Ady: Тэ Тэ; Kbd: Дэ Дэ	Pst.	Тызэтесыжьыгъ	Дызэтесыжащ	Дызэтесыжащ	We sat on ourselves
Subject: 2nd Person Singular — Ady О / Kbd Уэ
Ady: О О Kbd: Уэ Уэ	Pres.	Узэтесыжьы	Узэтесыжщ	Узэтесыжщ	You sit on yourself
Ady: О О Kbd: Уэ Уэ	Pst.	Узэтесыжьыгъ	Узэтесыжащ	Узэтесыжащ	You sat on yourself
Subject: 2nd Person Plural — Ady Шъо / Kbd Фэ
Ady: Шъо Шъо; Kbd: Фэ Фэ	Pres.	Шъузэтесыжьы	Фызэтесыжщ	Фызэтесыжщ	Y'all sit on yourselves
Ady: Шъо Шъо; Kbd: Фэ Фэ	Pst.	Шъузэтесыжьыгъ	Фызэтесыжащ	Фызэтесыжащ	Y'all sat on yourselves
Subject: 3rd Person Singular (Person A) — Ady Ар / Kbd Ар
Ady: Ар Ащ; Kbd: Ар Абы	Pres.	Зэтесыжьы	Зэтесыжщ	Зэтесыжщ	He sits on himself
Ady: Ар Ащ; Kbd: Ар Абы	Pst.	Зэтесыжьыгъ	Зэтесыжащ	Зэтесыжащ	He sat on himself
Subject: 3rd Person Plural (Group A) — Ady Ахэр / Kbd Ахэр
Ady: Ахэр Ахэмэ; Kbd: Ахэр Абыхэм	Pres.	Зэтесыжьых	Зэтесыжыхэщ	Зэтесыжщ	They sit on themselves
Ady: Ахэр Ахэмэ; Kbd: Ахэр Абыхэм	Pst.	Зэтесыжьыгъэх	Зэтесыжахэщ	Зэтесыжащ	They sat on themselves

== Bivalent Transitive Verb conjugation ==
A transitive bivalent verb takes an ergative subject (the agent) and an absolutive direct object (the patient). The model verb is Adyghe ылъэгъун /əɬaʁʷən/ / Kabardian лъагъун "to see".

Unlike the intransitive bivalent, there are no "inverse" gaps — every combination has a plain Base. The prefix that shifts with tense is the ergative agent, masked by the dynamic -о- in the present but surfacing bare in the past, where in Kabardian it is usually devoiced (see below).

A transitive verb has no oblique, so it skips the OBL slot; instead it fills ERG (the agent). The absolutive here is the object, and it comes first — before the ergative subject:

Slots used by ылъэгъун / лъагъун "to see"
	ABS (object)	CIS (directional)	ERG (subject / agent)	DYN (present)	Root (+ tense)
Adyghe — present	у-, сы-, ø, …	(къэ-)	с-, о-, е-, …	-э-	лъэгъу
Adyghe — past	(same)	(къэ-)	с-, п-, ы-, …	—	лъэгъу + -гъ
Kabardian — present	у-, сы-, ø, …	(къы-)	з-, б-, е-, …	-о-	лъагъу
Kabardian — past	(same)	(къы-)	с-, п-, и-, …	—	лъэгъу + -ащ

(The ergative agent prefix is the one that shifts with tense — masked by the dynamic -о- in the present and surfacing bare, often devoiced, in the past; see below.)

Worked examples — Adyghe:

- Усэлъэгъу — I see you (у- + с- + э- + лъэгъу) / past Услъэгъугъ
- Сыолъэгъу — You see me (сы- + о- + э- + лъэгъу) / past Сыплъэгъугъ

Worked examples — Kabardian:

- Узолъагъу — I see you (у- + з- + о- + лъагъу) / past Услъэгъуащ
- Сыболъагъу — You see me (сы- + б- + о- + лъагъу) / past Сыплъэгъуащ

The 3SG absolutive object ("him/it") is zero-marked in both languages (Сэлъэгъу / Солъагъу "I see (him)" carries no overt patient prefix). Alternative Adyghe agent forms — the я-series and dialectal -бэ- — are in Adyghe Variants; the older number-distinguishing plurals under Number in modern Kabardian.

The three language columns are Modern Adyghe, Proto-Kabardian and Modern Kabardian. Adyghe is conservative, so one column suffices; Proto-Kabardian keeps the older number distinctions, while Modern Kabardian collapses every 3rd-person plural to the singular (number then resting on the free pronouns ахэр / абыхэм). The two Kabardian columns therefore differ only in the 3PL cells — see Number in modern Kabardian below for the exact forms.

Conjugation of ылъэгъун / лъагъун (to see) — present and past tense
Config	Tense	Modern Adyghe	Proto- Kabardian	Modern Kabardian	English
Subject: 1st Person Singular — Ady Сэ / Kbd Сэ
Ady: Сэ О Kbd: Сэ Уэ	Pres.	Усэлъэгъу	Узолъагъу	Узолъагъу	I see you
Ady: Сэ О Kbd: Сэ Уэ	Pst.	Услъэгъугъ	Услъэгъуащ	Услъэгъуащ	I saw you
Ady: Сэ Шъо; Kbd: Сэ Фэ	Pres.	Шъусэлъэгъу	Фызолъагъу	Фызолъагъу	I see y'all
Ady: Сэ Шъо; Kbd: Сэ Фэ	Pst.	Шъуслъэгъугъ	Фыслъэгъуащ	Фыслъэгъуащ	I saw y'all
Ady: Сэ Ар; Kbd: Сэ Ар	Pres.	Сэлъэгъу	Солъагъу	Солъагъу	I see him
Ady: Сэ Ар; Kbd: Сэ Ар	Pst.	Слъэгъугъ	Слъэгъуащ	Слъэгъуащ	I saw him
Ady: Сэ Ахэр; Kbd: Сэ Ахэр	Pres.	Сэлъэгъух	Солъагъухэ	Солъагъу	I see them
Ady: Сэ Ахэр; Kbd: Сэ Ахэр	Pst.	Слъэгъугъэх	Слъэгъуахэщ	Слъэгъуащ	I saw them
Subject: 1st Person Plural — Ady Тэ / Kbd Дэ
Ady: Тэ О Kbd: Дэ Уэ	Pres.	Утэлъэгъу	Удолъагъу	Удолъагъу	We see you
Ady: Тэ О Kbd: Дэ Уэ	Pst.	Утлъэгъугъ	Утлъэгъуащ	Утлъэгъуащ	We saw you
Ady: Тэ Шъо; Kbd: Дэ Фэ	Pres.	Шъутэлъэгъу	Фыдолъагъу	Фыдолъагъу	We see y'all
Ady: Тэ Шъо; Kbd: Дэ Фэ	Pst.	Шъутлъэгъугъ	Фытлъэгъуащ	Фытлъэгъуащ	We saw y'all
Ady: Тэ Ар; Kbd: Дэ Ар	Pres.	Тэлъэгъу	Долъагъу	Долъагъу	We see him
Ady: Тэ Ар; Kbd: Дэ Ар	Pst.	Тлъэгъугъ	Тлъэгъуащ	Тлъэгъуащ	We saw him
Ady: Тэ Ахэр; Kbd: Дэ Ахэр	Pres.	Тэлъэгъух	Долъагъухэ	Долъагъу	We see them
Ady: Тэ Ахэр; Kbd: Дэ Ахэр	Pst.	Тлъэгъугъэх	Тлъэгъуахэщ	Тлъэгъуащ	We saw them
Subject: 2nd Person Singular — Ady О / Kbd Уэ
Ady: О Сэ; Kbd: Уэ Сэ	Pres.	Сыолъэгъу	Сыболъагъу	Сыболъагъу	You see me
Ady: О Сэ; Kbd: Уэ Сэ	Pst.	Сыплъэгъугъ	Сыплъэгъуащ	Сыплъэгъуащ	You saw me
Ady: О Тэ; Kbd: Уэ Дэ	Pres.	Тыолъэгъу	Дыболъагъу	Дыболъагъу	You see us
Ady: О Тэ; Kbd: Уэ Дэ	Pst.	Тыплъэгъугъ	Дыплъэгъуащ	Дыплъэгъуащ	You saw us
Ady: О Ар; Kbd: Уэ Ар	Pres.	Олъэгъу	Уолъагъу	Уолъагъу	You see him
Ady: О Ар; Kbd: Уэ Ар	Pst.	Улъэгъугъ	Улъэгъуащ	Улъэгъуащ	You saw him
Ady: О Ахэр; Kbd: Уэ Ахэр	Pres.	Олъэгъух	Уолъагъухэ	Уолъагъу	You see them
Ady: О Ахэр; Kbd: Уэ Ахэр	Pst.	Улъэгъугъэх	Улъэгъуахэщ	Улъэгъуащ	You saw them
Subject: 2nd Person Plural — Ady Шъо / Kbd Фэ
Ady: Шъо Сэ; Kbd: Фэ Сэ	Pres.	Сышъолъэгъу	Сыволъагъу	Сыволъагъу	Y'all see me
Ady: Шъо Сэ; Kbd: Фэ Сэ	Pst.	Сышъулъэгъугъ	Сыфлъэгъуащ	Сыфлъэгъуащ	Y'all saw me
Ady: Шъо Тэ; Kbd: Фэ Дэ	Pres.	Тышъолъэгъу	Дыволъагъу	Дыволъагъу	Y'all see us
Ady: Шъо Тэ; Kbd: Фэ Дэ	Pst.	Тышъулъэгъугъ	Дыфлъэгъуащ	Дыфлъэгъуащ	Y'all saw us
Ady: Шъо Ар; Kbd: Фэ Ар	Pres.	Шъолъэгъу	Фолъагъу	Фолъагъу	Y'all see him
Ady: Шъо Ар; Kbd: Фэ Ар	Pst.	Шъулъэгъугъ	Флъэгъуащ	Флъэгъуащ	Y'all saw him
Ady: Шъо Ахэр; Kbd: Фэ Ахэр	Pres.	Шъолъэгъух	Фолъагъухэ	Фолъагъу	Y'all see them
Ady: Шъо Ахэр; Kbd: Фэ Ахэр	Pst.	Шъулъэгъугъэх	Флъэгъуахэщ	Флъэгъуащ	Y'all saw them
Subject: 3rd Person Singular (Person A) — Ady Ащ / Kbd Абы
Ady: Ащ Сэ; Kbd: Абы Сэ	Pres.	Селъэгъу	Селъагъу	Селъагъу	He sees me
Ady: Ащ Сэ; Kbd: Абы Сэ	Pst.	Силъэгъугъ	Силъэгъуащ	Силъэгъуащ	He saw me
Ady: Ащ Тэ; Kbd: Абы Дэ	Pres.	Телъэгъу	Делъагъу	Делъагъу	He sees us
Ady: Ащ Тэ; Kbd: Абы Дэ	Pst.	Тилъэгъугъ	Дилъэгъуащ	Дилъэгъуащ	He saw us
Ady: Ащ О Kbd: Абы Уэ	Pres.	Уелъэгъу	Уелъагъу	Уелъагъу	He sees you
Ady: Ащ О Kbd: Абы Уэ	Pst.	Уилъэгъугъ	Уилъэгъуащ	Уилъэгъуащ	He saw you
Ady: Ащ Шъо; Kbd: Абы Фэ	Pres.	Шъуелъэгъу	Фелъагъу	Фелъагъу	He sees y'all
Ady: Ащ Шъо; Kbd: Абы Фэ	Pst.	Шъуилъэгъугъ	Филъэгъуащ	Филъэгъуащ	He saw y'all
Ady: Ащ Ар; Kbd: Абы Ар	Pres.	Елъэгъу	Елъагъу	Елъагъу	He sees him
Ady: Ащ Ар; Kbd: Абы Ар	Pst.	Ылъэгъугъ	Илъэгъуащ	Илъэгъуащ	He saw him
Ady: Ащ Ахэр; Kbd: Абы Ахэр	Pres.	Елъэгъух	Елъагъухэ	Елъагъу	He sees them
Ady: Ащ Ахэр; Kbd: Абы Ахэр	Pst.	Ылъэгъугъэх	Илъэгъуахэщ	Илъэгъуащ	He saw them
Subject: 3rd Person Plural (Group A) — Ady Ахэмэ / Kbd Абыхэм
Ady: Ахэмэ Сэ; Kbd: Абыхэм Сэ	Pres.	Салъэгъу	Салъагъу	Селъагъу	They see me
Ady: Ахэмэ Сэ; Kbd: Абыхэм Сэ	Pst.	Салъэгъугъ	Салъэгъуащ	Силъэгъуащ	They saw me
Ady: Ахэмэ Тэ; Kbd: Абыхэм Дэ	Pres.	Талъэгъу	Далъагъу	Делъагъу	They see us
Ady: Ахэмэ Тэ; Kbd: Абыхэм Дэ	Pst.	Талъэгъугъ	Далъэгъуащ	Дилъэгъуащ	They saw us
Ady: Ахэмэ О Kbd: Абыхэм Уэ	Pres.	Уалъэгъу	Уалъагъу	Уелъагъу	They see you
Ady: Ахэмэ О Kbd: Абыхэм Уэ	Pst.	Уалъэгъугъ	Уалъэгъуащ	Уилъэгъуащ	They saw you
Ady: Ахэмэ Шъо; Kbd: Абыхэм Фэ	Pres.	Шъуалъэгъу	Фалъагъу	Фелъагъу	They see y'all
Ady: Ахэмэ Шъо; Kbd: Абыхэм Фэ	Pst.	Шъуалъэгъугъ	Фалъэгъуащ	Филъэгъуащ	They saw y'all
Ady: Ахэмэ Ар; Kbd: Абыхэм Ар	Pres.	Алъэгъу	Ялъагъу	Елъагъу	They see him
Ady: Ахэмэ Ар; Kbd: Абыхэм Ар	Pst.	Алъэгъугъ	Ялъэгъуащ	Илъэгъуащ	They saw him
Ady: Ахэмэ Ахэр; Kbd: Абыхэм Ахэр	Pres.	Алъэгъух	Ялъагъухэ	Елъагъу	They see them
Ady: Ахэмэ Ахэр; Kbd: Абыхэм Ахэр	Pst.	Алъэгъугъэх	Ялъэгъуахэщ	Илъэгъуащ	They saw them

In the third person plural the two languages diverge as in the intransitive: Adyghe keeps an overt agent/object plural (е-/я-, -х), while Kabardian's modern plain form is syncretic (Елъагъу = "he/they see(s) him/them"). One point sets the transitive apart: unlike in the intransitive bivalent, the 3PL ergative я- (< а-) does surface in Kabardian — Ялъагъу "they see him", Ятх "they write (it)" — the archaic Base here (see Number in modern Kabardian).

=== Additional examples ===
Present transitive:

- ЛӀым бийр еукӀ. — "The man kills the enemy." (ergative subject лӀым, absolutive object бийр; еукӀ marks the 3SG agent).
- Тхылъыр абыхэм ятх. — "They write the book." (3PL agent marked by ergative я-).

Past transitive (no dynamic -о-):

- ЛӀым бийр иукӀащ. — "The man killed the enemy." (3SG past ergative и-, иукӀащ).
- Тхылъыр абыхэм ятхащ. — "They wrote the book." (3PL ergative я- + past -ащ).
- ХьащӀэхэр елъэӀуащ къуаджэдэсхэм ягъэшхэну, ауэ къуаджэдэсхэм ягъэхьэщӀэн ядакъым. — "The guests begged the villagers to feed them, but the villagers refused to host them." (past transitives ядакъым "they did not allow" with 3PL ergative я-, causative ягъэшхэну).

Devoicing in the Kabardian past. In the past the 1PL ergative д- devoices to т- before the voiceless lateral лъ (тлъэгъуащ, not *длъэгъуащ); likewise 2SG б-→п- and 2PL в-→ф-.

=== Number in modern Kabardian ===
Modern Kabardian marks neither a 3rd-person-plural ergative (agent) nor a 3rd-person-plural absolutive (object); the singular serves for both, with number on the free pronouns абыхэм / ахэр. "They see them" is normally Абыхэм ахэр елъагъу (singular елъагъу = "he sees him"). The я-/а- agent and -хэ object plural in the Proto-Kabardian column above are the older, number-distinguishing forms:

3PL agent / object: Proto-Kabardian vs. Modern Kabardian
Proto- Kabardian	Plurals	Modern Kabardian	English
Ялъагъу	3P ERG → 3S ERG	Елъагъу	they see him
Ялъэгъуащ	3P ERG → 3S ERG	Илъэгъуащ	they saw him
Солъагъухэ	3P ABS → 3S ABS	Солъагъу	I see them
Слъэгъуахэщ	3P ABS → 3S ABS	Слъэгъуащ	I saw them
Ялъагъухэ	3P ERG → 3S ERG; 3P ABS → 3S ABS	Елъагъу	they see them
Ялъэгъуахэщ	3P ERG → 3S ERG; 3P ABS → 3S ABS	Илъэгъуащ	they saw them

=== Adyghe Variants ===
Held back from the main table are the genuine Adyghe alternant forms: the dialectal -бэ- (2SG agent), the я-series (3PL agent), and the 3SG-ergative past ы-/и- alternant (Ылъэгъугъ ~ Илъэгъугъ). Kabardian has no variants of its own here — what used to be listed as Kabardian variants were Proto-Kabardian forms, now shown in the main table's Proto-Kabardian column (and the 2SG-ergative у-/б- alternant sits in the main table too). A dash means no Adyghe variant for that row.

Adyghe variants — -бэ- (2SG agent), я-series (3PL agent), ы-/и- (3SG-ergative past)
config ERG-ABS	Tense	Adyghe Standard	Adyghe Variants	English
Ady: О сэ Kbd: Уэ сэ	Pres.	Сыолъэгъу	Сыбэлъэгъу; Сыкъэбэлъэгъу	You see me
Ady: О сэ Kbd: Уэ сэ	Pst.	Сыплъэгъугъ	—	You saw me
Ady: О ар Kbd: Уэ ар	Pres.	Олъэгъу	Къэбэлъэгъу	You see him
Ady: О ар Kbd: Уэ ар	Pst.	Улъэгъугъ	—	You saw him
Ady: О тэ Kbd: Уэ дэ	Pres.	Тыолъэгъу	Тыбэлъэгъу; Тыкъэбэлъэгъу	You see us
Ady: О тэ Kbd: Уэ дэ	Pst.	Тыплъэгъугъ	—	You saw us
Ady: О ахэр Kbd: Уэ ахэр	Pres.	Олъэгъух	Къэбэлъэгъух	You see them
Ady: О ахэр Kbd: Уэ ахэр	Pst.	Улъэгъугъэх	—	You saw them
Ady: Ащ ар Kbd: Абы ар	Pres.	Елъэгъу	—	He sees him
Ady: Ащ ар Kbd: Абы ар	Pst.	Ылъэгъугъ	Илъэгъугъ	He saw him
Ady: Ащ ахэр Kbd: Абы ахэр	Pres.	Елъэгъух	—	He sees them
Ady: Ащ ахэр Kbd: Абы ахэр	Pst.	Ылъэгъугъэх	Илъэгъугъэх	He saw them
Ady: Ахэм сэ Kbd: Абыхэм сэ	Pres.	Салъэгъу	Сялъэгъу	They see me
Ady: Ахэм сэ Kbd: Абыхэм сэ	Pst.	Салъэгъугъ	Сялъэгъугъ	They saw me
Ady: Ахэм о Kbd: Абыхэм уэ	Pres.	Уалъэгъу	Уялъэгъу	They see you
Ady: Ахэм о Kbd: Абыхэм уэ	Pst.	Уалъэгъугъ	Уялъэгъугъ	They saw you
Ady: Ахэм ар Kbd: Абыхэм ар	Pres.	Алъэгъу	Ялъэгъу	They see him
Ady: Ахэм ар Kbd: Абыхэм ар	Pst.	Алъэгъугъ	Ялъэгъугъ	They saw him
Ady: Ахэм тэ Kbd: Абыхэм дэ	Pres.	Талъэгъу	Тялъэгъу	They see us
Ady: Ахэм тэ Kbd: Абыхэм дэ	Pst.	Талъэгъугъ	Тялъэгъугъ	They saw us
Ady: Ахэм шъо Kbd: Абыхэм фэ	Pres.	Шъуалъэгъу	Шъуялъэгъу	They see y'all
Ady: Ахэм шъо Kbd: Абыхэм фэ	Pst.	Шъуалъэгъугъ	Шъуялъэгъугъ	They saw y'all
Ady: Ахэм ахэр Kbd: Абыхэм ахэр	Pres.	Алъэгъух	Ялъэгъух	They see them
Ady: Ахэм ахэр Kbd: Абыхэм ахэр	Pst.	Алъэгъугъэх	Ялъэгъугъэх	They saw them

== Bivalent Transitive Reflexive Verbs conjugation ==
When the ergative subject and absolutive direct object of a bivalent transitive verb refer to the same participant, the verb is reflexive. This mirrors the intransitive reflexive: there the object is oblique, so the medial oblique slot takes the reflexive (word-medial з-, Сызэплъыжьы); here the object is absolutive, so the initial absolutive slot takes the reflexive зы- word-initially, while the ergative subject prefix is kept. The model verb is Adyghe ылъэгъун / Kabardian лъагъун "to see (oneself)".

Two features set this paradigm apart from the intransitive reflexive:

Intransitive vs. transitive reflexive
	Reflexive sits in…	Reflexive prefix	Refactive suffix
Intransitive reflexive	the oblique slot (medial)	Ady зэ- / Kbd з-~зэ-	Ady -жьы / Kbd -ыж
Transitive reflexive	the absolutive slot (initial)	зы- / зы- (both tenses)	Ady -жьы / Kbd -ж

Because the reflexive now occupies the leftmost (absolutive) slot, the prefix is uniformly зы- in both tenses; the ergative subject prefix keeps the usual present/past alternations:

Slots used by reflexive ылъэгъун / лъагъун "to see oneself"
	ABS (reflexive)	CIS (directional)	ERG (subject / agent)	DYN (present)	Root + refactive (+ tense)
Adyghe — present	зы-	(къэ-)	с-, о-, е-, …	-э-	лъэгъужьы
Adyghe — past	зы-	(къэ-)	с-, п-, ы-, …	—	лъэгъужьы + -гъ
Kabardian — present	зы-	(къы-)	з-, б-, е-, …	-о-	лъагъуж
Kabardian — past	зы-	(къы-)	с-, п-, и-, …	—	лъэгъуж + -ащ

Worked examples — Adyghe:

- Зысэлъэгъужьы — I see myself (зы- + с- + э- + лъэгъу-жьы)
- Зыолъэгъужьы — You see yourself (зы- + о- + э- + лъэгъу-жьы)

Worked examples — Kabardian:

- Зысолъагъуж — I see myself (зы- + с- + о- + лъагъу-ж)
- Зыболъагъуж — You see yourself (зы- + б- + о- + лъагъу-ж)

Points to note:

- The ergative subject prefix shows the same present/past alternations as the non-reflexive paradigm: 2SG Ady о-/п-, Kbd б-/п-; 3SG Ady е-/ы-, Kbd е-/и-; Kbd 1PL д-/т-, 2PL в-/ф-; 3PL а- (unchanged).
- Plurality is signalled through the ergative subject (e.g. 3PL а-), since the absolutive slot is always the reflexive зы-.
- The free-phrase column uses the 3rd-person reflexive pronoun Adyghe ежь (pl. ежьхэм) / Kabardian езым (pl. езыхэм), and a repeated personal pronoun for the 1st and 2nd persons.

The three language columns are Modern Adyghe, Proto-Kabardian and Modern Kabardian. Adyghe is conservative, so one column suffices; Proto-Kabardian keeps the older number distinctions, while Modern Kabardian collapses every 3rd-person plural to the singular (number then resting on the free pronouns ахэр / абыхэм). The two Kabardian columns therefore differ only in the 3PL cells — see Number in modern Kabardian below for the exact forms.

Conjugation of ылъэгъун / лъагъун (to see) — present and past tense
Config	Tense	Modern Adyghe	Proto- Kabardian	Modern Kabardian	English
Subject: 1st Person Singular — Ady Сэ / Kbd Сэ
Ady: Сэ Сэ; Kbd: Сэ Сэ	Pres.	Зысэлъэгъужьы	Зысолъагъуж	Зысолъагъуж	I see myself
Ady: Сэ Сэ; Kbd: Сэ Сэ	Pst.	Зыслъэгъужьыгъ	Зыслъэгъужащ	Зыслъэгъужащ	I saw myself
Subject: 1st Person Plural — Ady Тэ / Kbd Дэ
Ady: Тэ Тэ; Kbd: Дэ Дэ	Pres.	Зытэлъэгъужьы	Зыдолъагъуж	Зыдолъагъуж	We see ourselves
Ady: Тэ Тэ; Kbd: Дэ Дэ	Pst.	Зытлъэгъужьыгъ	Зытлъэгъужащ	Зытлъэгъужащ	We saw ourselves
Subject: 2nd Person Singular — Ady О / Kbd Уэ
Ady: О О Kbd: Уэ Уэ	Pres.	Зыолъэгъужьы	Зыболъагъуж	Зыболъагъуж	You see yourself
Ady: О О Kbd: Уэ Уэ	Pst.	Зыплъэгъужьыгъ	Зыплъэгъужащ	Зыплъэгъужащ	You saw yourself
Subject: 2nd Person Plural — Ady Шъо / Kbd Фэ
Ady: Шъо Шъо; Kbd: Фэ Фэ	Pres.	Зышъолъэгъужьы	Зыволъагъуж	Зыволъагъуж	Y'all see yourselves
Ady: Шъо Шъо; Kbd: Фэ Фэ	Pst.	Зышъулъэгъужьыгъ	Зыфлъэгъужащ	Зыфлъэгъужащ	Y'all saw yourselves
Subject: 3rd Person Singular (Person A) — Ady Ащ / Kbd Абы
Ady: Ащ Ар; Kbd: Абы Ар	Pres.	Зелъэгъужьы	Зелъагъуж	Зелъагъуж	He sees himself
Ady: Ащ Ар; Kbd: Абы Ар	Pst.	Зилъэгъужьыгъ	Зилъэгъужащ	Зилъэгъужащ	He saw himself
Subject: 3rd Person Plural (Group A) — Ady Ахэмэ / Kbd Абыхэм
Ady: Ахэмэ Ахэр; Kbd: Абыхэм Ахэр	Pres.	Залъэгъужьы	Залъагъуж	Зелъагъуж	They see themselves
Ady: Ахэмэ Ахэр; Kbd: Абыхэм Ахэр	Pst.	Залъэгъужьыгъ	Залъэгъужащ	Зилъэгъужащ	They saw themselves

=== Number in modern Kabardian ===
The reflexive's only plural argument is the ergative agent. The transitive 3PL ergative (за- < зы- + а-) is comparatively well preserved, but the modern language still tends to carry the plural on the free pronoun (абыхэм / ахэр) and leave the verb singular (зе-/зи-), as in the non-reflexive transitive (Ялъагъу → Елъагъу).

3PL agent: number-distinguishing vs. modern Kabardian
Proto- Kabardian	Plurals	Modern Kabardian	English
Залъагъуж	3P ERG → 3S ERG	Зелъагъуж	they see themselves
Залъэгъужащ	3P ERG → 3S ERG	Зилъэгъужащ	they saw themselves

== Trivalent Ditransitive Verbs conjugation ==
A trivalent (ditransitive) verb takes three arguments at once: an ergative agent (the giver), an absolutive theme (the thing or person given), and an oblique recipient. Both languages build the paradigm on the root "to give" — Adyghe ты (infinitive етын) / Kabardian т (етын). A full 7×7×7 paradigm runs to several hundred forms, so a representative set is tabulated below.

The key regularity: a linking -р- appears between recipient and agent only when both are 3rd person (below).

Because a trivalent verb has all three arguments at once, it is the one class that fills every slot of the template (theme = ABS, recipient = OBL, agent = ERG):

Slots used by етын / етын "to give" — the full template
	ABS (theme)	CIS (directional)	OBL (recipient)	ERG (agent)	DYN (present)	Root (+ tense)
Adyghe — present	theme prefix	(къы-)	recipient prefix	agent prefix	-э-	ты
Adyghe — past	theme prefix	(къы-)	recipient prefix	agent prefix	—	ты + -гъ
Kabardian — present	theme prefix	(къы-)	recipient prefix	agent prefix	-о-	т
Kabardian — past	theme prefix	(къы-)	recipient prefix	agent prefix	—	т + -ащ

The person prefixes that go into the three variable slots (1SG, 2SG, 3SG, 1PL, 2PL, 3PL; allomorphs in slashes/parentheses, Ø = zero):

Person fillers for the theme, recipient and agent slots
Slot	Adyghe	Kabardian
Theme (ABS)	у-/сы-/Ø/ты-/шъу-/Ø	у-/с(ы)-/Ø/д(ы)-/ф(ы)-/Ø
Recipient (OBL)	с-/о-/е-/т-/шъо-/а-	з/с-/у-/е(и)-/д-/ф-/я(а)-
Agent (ERG)	с-/о-(п-)/е-(ы-)/т-/шъу-/а-	з/с-/б(п)-/е(и)-/д(т)-/в(ф)-/а-

Worked examples — Adyghe:

- Уесэты — I give you to him (у- + е- + с- + э- + ты); past Уестыгъ
- Къыосэты — I give it to you (къы- + о- + с- + э- + ты); past Къыостыгъ

Worked examples — Kabardian:

- Узот — I give you to him (у- + е- + з- + о- + т); past Уестащ
- Къызет — He gives it to me (къы- + з- + е- + т); past Къыситащ

=== The linking consonant -р-: when it appears ===
A linking consonant -р- is inserted at the oblique–ergative boundary if and only if both the oblique recipient and the ergative agent are 3rd person. The reason is phonological: the 3rd-person oblique (е-/я-) and ergative (е-/а-) are both vowel prefixes, and -р- bridges the hiatus; a 1st/2nd-person prefix in either slot breaks the hiatus, so no bridge is needed. The absolutive theme plays no part.

When triggered, the 3rd-person ergative surfaces as linking -ре- (3sg present) / -ри- (3sg past) / -ра- (3pl). What happens to the 3sg singular oblique in front of it differs between the two languages — see The hidden Oblique prefix below.

When does the linking -р- appear? (OBL = recipient, ERG = agent)
Meaning	OBL 3rd?	ERG 3rd?	-р-?	Adyghe	Kabardian
he gives me to him	yes	yes	yes	сыреты	срет
he gives it to him	yes	yes	yes	реты	ирет
he gives me to you	no (2)	yes	no	сыкъыуеты	сыкъыует
he gives it to me	no (1)	yes	no	къысеты	къызет
he gives them to you	no (2)	yes	no	къыуетых	къыует
I give you to him	yes	no (1)	no	уесэты	узот
you give me to them	yes	no (2)	no	саоты	сыбот
I give it to him	yes	no (1)	no	есэты	изот
you give them to him	yes	no (2)	no	еотых	ибот

==== Standard Paradigm ====
- (Sorted by Ergative Agent, then Absolutive Theme, then Oblique Recipient.)*

The three language columns are Modern Adyghe, Proto-Kabardian and Modern Kabardian. Adyghe is conservative, so one column suffices; Proto-Kabardian keeps the older number distinctions, while Modern Kabardian collapses every 3rd-person plural to the singular (number then resting on the free pronouns ахэр / абыхэм). The two Kabardian columns therefore differ only in the 3PL cells — see Number in modern Kabardian below for the exact forms.

Conjugation of етын / етын (to give) — present and past tense
Config	Tense	Modern Adyghe	Proto- Kabardian	Modern Kabardian	English
Subject: 1st Person Singular — Ady Сэ / Kbd Сэ
Ady: Сэ О Ащ; Kbd: Сэ Уэ Абы	Pres.	Уесэты	Узот	Узот	I give you to him
Ady: Сэ О Ащ; Kbd: Сэ Уэ Абы	Pst.	Уестгъ	Уестащ	Уестащ	I gave you to him
Ady: Сэ О Ахэмэ; Kbd: Сэ Уэ Абыхэм	Pres.	Уасэты	Уазот	Узот	I give you to them
Ady: Сэ О Ахэмэ; Kbd: Сэ Уэ Абыхэм	Pst.	Уастгъ	Уастащ	Уестащ	I gave you to them
Ady: Сэ Шъо Ащ; Kbd: Сэ Фэ Абы	Pres.	Шъуесэты	Фызот	Фызот	I give y'all to him
Ady: Сэ Шъо Ащ; Kbd: Сэ Фэ Абы	Pst.	Шъуестгъ	Фестащ	Фестащ	I gave y'all to him
Ady: Сэ Шъо Ахэмэ; Kbd: Сэ Фэ Абыхэм	Pres.	Шъуасэты	Фазот	Фызот	I give y'all to them
Ady: Сэ Шъо Ахэмэ; Kbd: Сэ Фэ Абыхэм	Pst.	Шъуастгъ	Фастащ	Фестащ	I gave y'all to them
Ady: Сэ Ар О Kbd: Сэ Ар Уэ	Pres.	Къыосэты	Узот	Узот	I give him to you
Ady: Сэ Ар О Kbd: Сэ Ар Уэ	Pst.	Къыостгъ	Уэстащ	Уэстащ	I gave him to you
Ady: Сэ Ар Шъо; Kbd: Сэ Ар Фэ	Pres.	Къышъосэты	Фызот	Фызот	I give him to y'all
Ady: Сэ Ар Шъо; Kbd: Сэ Ар Фэ	Pst.	Къышъостгъ	Фэстащ	Фэстащ	I gave him to y'all
Ady: Сэ Ар Ащ; Kbd: Сэ Ар Абы	Pres.	Есэты	Изот	Изот	I give him to him
Ady: Сэ Ар Ащ; Kbd: Сэ Ар Абы	Pst.	Естгъ	Естащ	Естащ	I gave him to him
Ady: Сэ Ар Ахэмэ; Kbd: Сэ Ар Абыхэм	Pres.	Асэты	Язот	Изот	I give him to them
Ady: Сэ Ар Ахэмэ; Kbd: Сэ Ар Абыхэм	Pst.	Астгъ	Ястащ	Естащ	I gave him to them
Ady: Сэ Ахэр О Kbd: Сэ Ахэр Уэ	Pres.	Къыосэтых	Узотыхэ	Узот	I give them to you
Ady: Сэ Ахэр О Kbd: Сэ Ахэр Уэ	Pst.	Къыостгъэх	Уэстахэщ	Уэстащ	I gave them to you
Ady: Сэ Ахэр Шъо; Kbd: Сэ Ахэр Фэ	Pres.	Къышъосэтых	Фызотыхэ	Фызот	I give them to y'all
Ady: Сэ Ахэр Шъо; Kbd: Сэ Ахэр Фэ	Pst.	Къышъостгъэх	Фэстахэщ	Фэстащ	I gave them to y'all
Ady: Сэ Ахэр Ащ; Kbd: Сэ Ахэр Абы	Pres.	Есэтых	Изотыхэ	Изот	I give them to him
Ady: Сэ Ахэр Ащ; Kbd: Сэ Ахэр Абы	Pst.	Естгъэх	Естахэщ	Естащ	I gave them to him
Ady: Сэ Ахэр Ахэмэ; Kbd: Сэ Ахэр Абыхэм	Pres.	Асэтых	Язотыхэ	Изот	I give them to them
Ady: Сэ Ахэр Ахэмэ; Kbd: Сэ Ахэр Абыхэм	Pst.	Астгъэх	Ястахэщ	Естащ	I gave them to them
Subject: 1st Person Plural — Ady Тэ / Kbd Дэ
Ady: Тэ О Ащ; Kbd: Дэ Уэ Абы	Pres.	Уетэты	Удот	Удот	We give you to him
Ady: Тэ О Ащ; Kbd: Дэ Уэ Абы	Pst.	Уеттгъ	Уеттащ	Уеттащ	We gave you to him
Ady: Тэ О Ахэмэ; Kbd: Дэ Уэ Абыхэм	Pres.	Уатэты	Уадот	Удот	We give you to them
Ady: Тэ О Ахэмэ; Kbd: Дэ Уэ Абыхэм	Pst.	Уаттгъ	Уаттащ	Уеттащ	We gave you to them
Ady: Тэ Шъо Ащ; Kbd: Дэ Фэ Абы	Pres.	Шъуетэты	Фыдот	Фыдот	We give y'all to him
Ady: Тэ Шъо Ащ; Kbd: Дэ Фэ Абы	Pst.	Шъуеттгъ	Феттащ	Феттащ	We gave y'all to him
Ady: Тэ Шъо Ахэмэ; Kbd: Дэ Фэ Абыхэм	Pres.	Шъуатэты	Фадот	Фыдот	We give y'all to them
Ady: Тэ Шъо Ахэмэ; Kbd: Дэ Фэ Абыхэм	Pst.	Шъуаттгъ	Фаттащ	Феттащ	We gave y'all to them
Ady: Тэ Ар О Kbd: Дэ Ар Уэ	Pres.	Къыотэты	Удот	Удот	We give him to you
Ady: Тэ Ар О Kbd: Дэ Ар Уэ	Pst.	Къыоттгъ	Уэттащ	Уэттащ	We gave him to you
Ady: Тэ Ар Шъо; Kbd: Дэ Ар Фэ	Pres.	Къышъотэты	Фыдот	Фыдот	We give him to y'all
Ady: Тэ Ар Шъо; Kbd: Дэ Ар Фэ	Pst.	Къышъоттгъ	Фэттащ	Фэттащ	We gave him to y'all
Ady: Тэ Ар Ащ; Kbd: Дэ Ар Абы	Pres.	Етэты	Идот	Идот	We give him to him
Ady: Тэ Ар Ащ; Kbd: Дэ Ар Абы	Pst.	Еттгъ	Еттащ	Еттащ	We gave him to him
Ady: Тэ Ар Ахэмэ; Kbd: Дэ Ар Абыхэм	Pres.	Атэты	Ядот	Идот	We give him to them
Ady: Тэ Ар Ахэмэ; Kbd: Дэ Ар Абыхэм	Pst.	Аттгъ	Яттащ	Еттащ	We gave him to them
Ady: Тэ Ахэр О Kbd: Дэ Ахэр Уэ	Pres.	Къыотэтых	Удотыхэ	Удот	We give them to you
Ady: Тэ Ахэр О Kbd: Дэ Ахэр Уэ	Pst.	Къыоттгъэх	Уэттахэщ	Уэттащ	We gave them to you
Ady: Тэ Ахэр Шъо; Kbd: Дэ Ахэр Фэ	Pres.	Къышъотэтых	Фыдотыхэ	Фыдот	We give them to y'all
Ady: Тэ Ахэр Шъо; Kbd: Дэ Ахэр Фэ	Pst.	Къышъоттгъэх	Фэттахэщ	Фэттащ	We gave them to y'all
Ady: Тэ Ахэр Ащ; Kbd: Дэ Ахэр Абы	Pres.	Етэтых	Идотыхэ	Идот	We give them to him
Ady: Тэ Ахэр Ащ; Kbd: Дэ Ахэр Абы	Pst.	Еттгъэх	Еттахэщ	Еттащ	We gave them to him
Ady: Тэ Ахэр Ахэмэ; Kbd: Дэ Ахэр Абыхэм	Pres.	Атэтых	Ядотыхэ	Идот	We give them to them
Ady: Тэ Ахэр Ахэмэ; Kbd: Дэ Ахэр Абыхэм	Pst.	Аттгъэх	Яттахэщ	Еттащ	We gave them to them
Subject: 2nd Person Singular — Ady О / Kbd Уэ
Ady: О Сэ Ащ; Kbd: Уэ Сэ Абы	Pres.	Сеоты	Сыбот	Сыбот	You give me to him
Ady: О Сэ Ащ; Kbd: Уэ Сэ Абы	Pst.	Септгъ	Септащ	Септащ	You gave me to him
Ady: О Сэ Ахэмэ; Kbd: Уэ Сэ Абыхэм	Pres.	Саоты	Сабот	Сыбот	You give me to them
Ady: О Сэ Ахэмэ; Kbd: Уэ Сэ Абыхэм	Pst.	Саптгъ	Саптащ	Септащ	You gave me to them
Ady: О Тэ Ащ; Kbd: Уэ Дэ Абы	Pres.	Теоты	Дыбот	Дыбот	You give us to him
Ady: О Тэ Ащ; Kbd: Уэ Дэ Абы	Pst.	Тептгъ	Дептащ	Дептащ	You gave us to him
Ady: О Тэ Ахэмэ; Kbd: Уэ Дэ Абыхэм	Pres.	Таоты	Дабот	Дыбот	You give us to them
Ady: О Тэ Ахэмэ; Kbd: Уэ Дэ Абыхэм	Pst.	Таптгъ	Даптащ	Дептащ	You gave us to them
Ady: О Ар Сэ; Kbd: Уэ Ар Сэ	Pres.	Къысэоты	Къызыбот	Къызыбот	You give him to me
Ady: О Ар Сэ; Kbd: Уэ Ар Сэ	Pst.	Къысэптгъ	Къызэптащ	Къызэптащ	You gave him to me
Ady: О Ар Тэ; Kbd: Уэ Ар Дэ	Pres.	Къытэоты	Къыдыбот	Къыдыбот	You give him to us
Ady: О Ар Тэ; Kbd: Уэ Ар Дэ	Pst.	Къытэптгъ	Къыдэптащ	Къыдэптащ	You gave him to us
Ady: О Ар Ащ; Kbd: Уэ Ар Абы	Pres.	Еоты	Ибот	Ибот	You give him to him
Ady: О Ар Ащ; Kbd: Уэ Ар Абы	Pst.	Ептгъ	Ептащ	Ептащ	You gave him to him
Ady: О Ар Ахэмэ; Kbd: Уэ Ар Абыхэм	Pres.	Аоты	Ябот	Ибот	You give him to them
Ady: О Ар Ахэмэ; Kbd: Уэ Ар Абыхэм	Pst.	Аптгъ	Яптащ	Ептащ	You gave him to them
Ady: О Ахэр Сэ; Kbd: Уэ Ахэр Сэ	Pres.	Къысэотых	Къызыбот	Къызыбот	You give them to me
Ady: О Ахэр Сэ; Kbd: Уэ Ахэр Сэ	Pst.	Къысэптгъэх	Къызэптахэщ	Къызэптащ	You gave them to me
Ady: О Ахэр Тэ; Kbd: Уэ Ахэр Дэ	Pres.	Къытэотых	Къыдыбот	Къыдыбот	You give them to us
Ady: О Ахэр Тэ; Kbd: Уэ Ахэр Дэ	Pst.	Къытэптгъэх	Къыдэптахэщ	Къыдэптащ	You gave them to us
Ady: О Ахэр Ащ; Kbd: Уэ Ахэр Абы	Pres.	Еотых	Иботыхэ	Ибот	You give them to him
Ady: О Ахэр Ащ; Kbd: Уэ Ахэр Абы	Pst.	Ептгъэх	Ептахэщ	Ептащ	You gave them to him
Ady: О Ахэр Ахэмэ; Kbd: Уэ Ахэр Абыхэм	Pres.	Аотых	Яботыхэ	Ибот	You give them to them
Ady: О Ахэр Ахэмэ; Kbd: Уэ Ахэр Абыхэм	Pst.	Аптгъэх	Яптахэщ	Ептащ	You gave them to them
Subject: 2nd Person Plural — Ady Шъо / Kbd Фэ
Ady: Шъо Сэ Ащ; Kbd: Фэ Сэ Абы	Pres.	Сешъоты	Сывот	Сывот	Y'all give me to him
Ady: Шъо Сэ Ащ; Kbd: Фэ Сэ Абы	Pst.	Сешъутгъ	Сефтащ	Сефтащ	Y'all gave me to him
Ady: Шъо Сэ Ахэмэ; Kbd: Фэ Сэ Абыхэм	Pres.	Сашъоты	Савот	Сывот	Y'all give me to them
Ady: Шъо Сэ Ахэмэ; Kbd: Фэ Сэ Абыхэм	Pst.	Сашъутгъ	Сафтащ	Сефтащ	Y'all gave me to them
Ady: Шъо Тэ Ащ; Kbd: Фэ Дэ Абы	Pres.	Тешъоты	Дывот	Дывот	Y'all give us to him
Ady: Шъо Тэ Ащ; Kbd: Фэ Дэ Абы	Pst.	Тешъутгъ	Дефтащ	Дефтащ	Y'all gave us to him
Ady: Шъо Тэ Ахэмэ; Kbd: Фэ Дэ Абыхэм	Pres.	Ташъоты	Давот	Дывот	Y'all give us to them
Ady: Шъо Тэ Ахэмэ; Kbd: Фэ Дэ Абыхэм	Pst.	Ташъутгъ	Дафтащ	Дефтащ	Y'all gave us to them
Ady: Шъо Ар Сэ; Kbd: Фэ Ар Сэ	Pres.	Къысэшъоты	Къызывот	Къызывот	Y'all give him to me
Ady: Шъо Ар Сэ; Kbd: Фэ Ар Сэ	Pst.	Къысэшъутгъ	Къызэфтащ	Къызэфтащ	Y'all gave him to me
Ady: Шъо Ар Тэ; Kbd: Фэ Ар Дэ	Pres.	Къытэшъоты	Къыдывот	Къыдывот	Y'all give him to us
Ady: Шъо Ар Тэ; Kbd: Фэ Ар Дэ	Pst.	Къытэшъутгъ	Къыдэфтащ	Къыдэфтащ	Y'all gave him to us
Ady: Шъо Ар Ащ; Kbd: Фэ Ар Абы	Pres.	Ешъоты	Ивот	Ивот	Y'all give him to him
Ady: Шъо Ар Ащ; Kbd: Фэ Ар Абы	Pst.	Ешъутгъ	Ефтащ	Ефтащ	Y'all gave him to him
Ady: Шъо Ар Ахэмэ; Kbd: Фэ Ар Абыхэм	Pres.	Ашъоты	Явот	Ивот	Y'all give him to them
Ady: Шъо Ар Ахэмэ; Kbd: Фэ Ар Абыхэм	Pst.	Ашъутгъ	Яфтащ	Ефтащ	Y'all gave him to them
Ady: Шъо Ахэр Сэ; Kbd: Фэ Ахэр Сэ	Pres.	Къысэшъотых	Къызывот	Къызывот	Y'all give them to me
Ady: Шъо Ахэр Сэ; Kbd: Фэ Ахэр Сэ	Pst.	Къысэшъутгъэх	Къызэфтахэщ	Къызэфтащ	Y'all gave them to me
Ady: Шъо Ахэр Тэ; Kbd: Фэ Ахэр Дэ	Pres.	Къытэшъотых	Къыдывот	Къыдывот	Y'all give them to us
Ady: Шъо Ахэр Тэ; Kbd: Фэ Ахэр Дэ	Pst.	Къытэшъутгъэх	Къыдэфтахэщ	Къыдэфтащ	Y'all gave them to us
Ady: Шъо Ахэр Ащ; Kbd: Фэ Ахэр Абы	Pres.	Ешъотых	Ивотыхэ	Ивот	Y'all give them to him
Ady: Шъо Ахэр Ащ; Kbd: Фэ Ахэр Абы	Pst.	Ешъутгъэх	Ефтахэщ	Ефтащ	Y'all gave them to him
Ady: Шъо Ахэр Ахэмэ; Kbd: Фэ Ахэр Абыхэм	Pres.	Ашъотых	Явотыхэ	Ивот	Y'all give them to them
Ady: Шъо Ахэр Ахэмэ; Kbd: Фэ Ахэр Абыхэм	Pst.	Ашъутгъэх	Яфтахэщ	Ефтащ	Y'all gave them to them
Subject: 3rd Person Singular (Person A) — Ady Ащ / Kbd Абы
Ady: Ащ Сэ О Kbd: Абы Сэ Уэ	Pres.	Сыкъыуеты	Сыкъыует	Сыкъыует	He gives me to you
Ady: Ащ Сэ О Kbd: Абы Сэ Уэ	Pst.	Сыкъыуитгъ	Сыкъыуитащ	Сыкъыуитащ	He gave me to you
Ady: Ащ Сэ Шъо; Kbd: Абы Сэ Фэ	Pres.	Сыкъышъуеты	Сыкъывет	Сыкъывет	He gives me to y'all
Ady: Ащ Сэ Шъо; Kbd: Абы Сэ Фэ	Pst.	Сыкъышъуитгъ	Сыкъыфитащ	Сыкъыфитащ	He gave me to y'all
Ady: Ащ Сэ Ащ; Kbd: Абы Сэ Абы	Pres.	Среты	Срет	Срет	He gives me to him
Ady: Ащ Сэ Ащ; Kbd: Абы Сэ Абы	Pst.	Сритгъ	Сыритащ	Сыритащ	He gave me to him
Ady: Ащ Сэ Ахэмэ; Kbd: Абы Сэ Абыхэм	Pres.	Сареты	Сарет	Срет	He gives me to them
Ady: Ащ Сэ Ахэмэ; Kbd: Абы Сэ Абыхэм	Pst.	Саритгъ	Саритащ	Сыритащ	He gave me to them
Ady: Ащ Тэ О Kbd: Абы Дэ Уэ	Pres.	Тыкъыуеты	Дыкъыует	Дыкъыует	He gives us to you
Ady: Ащ Тэ О Kbd: Абы Дэ Уэ	Pst.	Тыкъыуитгъ	Дыкъыуитащ	Дыкъыуитащ	He gave us to you
Ady: Ащ Тэ Шъо; Kbd: Абы Дэ Фэ	Pres.	Тыкъышъуеты	Дыкъывет	Дыкъывет	He gives us to y'all
Ady: Ащ Тэ Шъо; Kbd: Абы Дэ Фэ	Pst.	Тыкъышъуитгъ	Дыкъыфитащ	Дыкъыфитащ	He gave us to y'all
Ady: Ащ Тэ Ащ; Kbd: Абы Дэ Абы	Pres.	Треты	Дрет	Дрет	He gives us to him
Ady: Ащ Тэ Ащ; Kbd: Абы Дэ Абы	Pst.	Тритгъ	Дыритащ	Дыритащ	He gave us to him
Ady: Ащ Тэ Ахэмэ; Kbd: Абы Дэ Абыхэм	Pres.	Тареты	Дарет	Дрет	He gives us to them
Ady: Ащ Тэ Ахэмэ; Kbd: Абы Дэ Абыхэм	Pst.	Таритгъ	Даритащ	Дыритащ	He gave us to them
Ady: Ащ О Сэ; Kbd: Абы Уэ Сэ	Pres.	Укъысеты	Укъызет	Укъызет	He gives you to me
Ady: Ащ О Сэ; Kbd: Абы Уэ Сэ	Pst.	Укъыситгъ	Укъыситащ	Укъыситащ	He gave you to me
Ady: Ащ О Тэ; Kbd: Абы Уэ Дэ	Pres.	Укъытеты	Укъыдет	Укъыдет	He gives you to us
Ady: Ащ О Тэ; Kbd: Абы Уэ Дэ	Pst.	Укъытитгъ	Укъыдитащ	Укъыдитащ	He gave you to us
Ady: Ащ О Ащ; Kbd: Абы Уэ Абы	Pres.	Уреты	Урет	Урет	He gives you to him
Ady: Ащ О Ащ; Kbd: Абы Уэ Абы	Pst.	Уритгъ	Уритащ	Уритащ	He gave you to him
Ady: Ащ О Ахэмэ; Kbd: Абы Уэ Абыхэм	Pres.	Уареты	Уарет	Урет	He gives you to them
Ady: Ащ О Ахэмэ; Kbd: Абы Уэ Абыхэм	Pst.	Уаритгъ	Уаритащ	Уритащ	He gave you to them
Ady: Ащ Шъо Сэ; Kbd: Абы Фэ Сэ	Pres.	Шъукъысеты	Фыкъызет	Фыкъызет	He gives y'all to me
Ady: Ащ Шъо Сэ; Kbd: Абы Фэ Сэ	Pst.	Шъукъыситгъ	Фыкъыситащ	Фыкъыситащ	He gave y'all to me
Ady: Ащ Шъо Тэ; Kbd: Абы Фэ Дэ	Pres.	Шъукъытеты	Фыкъыдет	Фыкъыдет	He gives y'all to us
Ady: Ащ Шъо Тэ; Kbd: Абы Фэ Дэ	Pst.	Шъукъытитгъ	Фыкъыдитащ	Фыкъыдитащ	He gave y'all to us
Ady: Ащ Шъо Ащ; Kbd: Абы Фэ Абы	Pres.	Шъуреты	Фрет	Фрет	He gives y'all to him
Ady: Ащ Шъо Ащ; Kbd: Абы Фэ Абы	Pst.	Шъуритгъ	Фритащ	Фритащ	He gave y'all to him
Ady: Ащ Шъо Ахэмэ; Kbd: Абы Фэ Абыхэм	Pres.	Шъуареты	Фарет	Фрет	He gives y'all to them
Ady: Ащ Шъо Ахэмэ; Kbd: Абы Фэ Абыхэм	Pst.	Шъуаритгъ	Фаритащ	Фритащ	He gave y'all to them
Ady: Ащ Ар Сэ; Kbd: Абы Ар Сэ	Pres.	Къысеты	Къызет	Къызет	He gives him to me
Ady: Ащ Ар Сэ; Kbd: Абы Ар Сэ	Pst.	Къыситгъ	Къыситащ	Къыситащ	He gave him to me
Ady: Ащ Ар Тэ; Kbd: Абы Ар Дэ	Pres.	Къытеты	Къыдет	Къыдет	He gives him to us
Ady: Ащ Ар Тэ; Kbd: Абы Ар Дэ	Pst.	Къытитгъ	Къыдитащ	Къыдитащ	He gave him to us
Ady: Ащ Ар О Kbd: Абы Ар Уэ	Pres.	Къыуеты	Къыует	Къыует	He gives him to you
Ady: Ащ Ар О Kbd: Абы Ар Уэ	Pst.	Къыуитгъ	Къыуитащ	Къыуитащ	He gave him to you
Ady: Ащ Ар Шъо; Kbd: Абы Ар Фэ	Pres.	Къышъуеты	Къывет	Къывет	He gives him to y'all
Ady: Ащ Ар Шъо; Kbd: Абы Ар Фэ	Pst.	Къышъуитгъ	Къыфитащ	Къыфитащ	He gave him to y'all
Ady: Ащ Ар Ащ; Kbd: Абы Ар Абы	Pres.	Реты	Ирет	Ирет	He gives him to him
Ady: Ащ Ар Ащ; Kbd: Абы Ар Абы	Pst.	Ритгъ	Иритащ	Иритащ	He gave him to him
Ady: Ащ Ар Ахэмэ; Kbd: Абы Ар Абыхэм	Pres.	Ареты	Ярет	Ирет	He gives him to them
Ady: Ащ Ар Ахэмэ; Kbd: Абы Ар Абыхэм	Pst.	Аритгъ	Яритащ	Иритащ	He gave him to them
Ady: Ащ Ахэр Сэ; Kbd: Абы Ахэр Сэ	Pres.	Къысетых	Къызетыхэ	Къызет	He gives them to me
Ady: Ащ Ахэр Сэ; Kbd: Абы Ахэр Сэ	Pst.	Къыситгъэх	Къыситахэщ	Къыситащ	He gave them to me
Ady: Ащ Ахэр Тэ; Kbd: Абы Ахэр Дэ	Pres.	Къытетых	Къыдетыхэ	Къыдет	He gives them to us
Ady: Ащ Ахэр Тэ; Kbd: Абы Ахэр Дэ	Pst.	Къытитгъэх	Къыдитахэщ	Къыдитащ	He gave them to us
Ady: Ащ Ахэр О Kbd: Абы Ахэр Уэ	Pres.	Къыуетых	Къыуетыхэ	Къыует	He gives them to you
Ady: Ащ Ахэр О Kbd: Абы Ахэр Уэ	Pst.	Къыуитгъэх	Къыуитахэщ	Къыуитащ	He gave them to you
Ady: Ащ Ахэр Шъо; Kbd: Абы Ахэр Фэ	Pres.	Къышъуетых	Къыветыхэ	Къывет	He gives them to y'all
Ady: Ащ Ахэр Шъо; Kbd: Абы Ахэр Фэ	Pst.	Къышъуитгъэх	Къыфитахэщ	Къыфитащ	He gave them to y'all
Ady: Ащ Ахэр Ащ; Kbd: Абы Ахэр Абы	Pres.	Ретых	Иретыхэ	Ирет	He gives them to him
Ady: Ащ Ахэр Ащ; Kbd: Абы Ахэр Абы	Pst.	Ритгъэх	Иритахэщ	Иритащ	He gave them to him
Ady: Ащ Ахэр Ахэмэ; Kbd: Абы Ахэр Абыхэм	Pres.	Аретых	Яретыхэ	Ирет	He gives them to them
Ady: Ащ Ахэр Ахэмэ; Kbd: Абы Ахэр Абыхэм	Pst.	Аритгъэх	Яритахэщ	Иритащ	He gave them to them
Subject: 3rd Person Plural (Group A) — Ady Ахэмэ / Kbd Абыхэм
Ady: Ахэмэ Сэ О Kbd: Абыхэм Сэ Уэ	Pres.	Сыкъыуаты	Сыкъыуат	Сыкъыует	They give me to you
Ady: Ахэмэ Сэ О Kbd: Абыхэм Сэ Уэ	Pst.	Сыкъыуатгъ	Сыкъыуатащ	Сыкъыуитащ	They gave me to you
Ady: Ахэмэ Сэ Шъо; Kbd: Абыхэм Сэ Фэ	Pres.	Сыкъышъуаты	Сыкъыват	Сыкъывет	They give me to y'all
Ady: Ахэмэ Сэ Шъо; Kbd: Абыхэм Сэ Фэ	Pst.	Сыкъышъуатгъ	Сыкъыфатащ	Сыкъыфитащ	They gave me to y'all
Ady: Ахэмэ Сэ Ащ; Kbd: Абыхэм Сэ Абы	Pres.	Сраты	Сырат	Срет	They give me to him
Ady: Ахэмэ Сэ Ащ; Kbd: Абыхэм Сэ Абы	Pst.	Сратгъ	Сыратащ	Сыритащ	They gave me to him
Ady: Ахэмэ Сэ Ахэмэ; Kbd: Абыхэм Сэ Абыхэм	Pres.	Сараты	Сарат	Срет	They give me to them
Ady: Ахэмэ Сэ Ахэмэ; Kbd: Абыхэм Сэ Абыхэм	Pst.	Саратгъ	Саратащ	Сыритащ	They gave me to them
Ady: Ахэмэ Тэ О Kbd: Абыхэм Дэ Уэ	Pres.	Тыкъыуаты	Дыкъыуат	Дыкъыует	They give us to you
Ady: Ахэмэ Тэ О Kbd: Абыхэм Дэ Уэ	Pst.	Тыкъыуатгъ	Дыкъыуатащ	Дыкъыуитащ	They gave us to you
Ady: Ахэмэ Тэ Шъо; Kbd: Абыхэм Дэ Фэ	Pres.	Тыкъышъуаты	Дыкъыват	Дыкъывет	They give us to y'all
Ady: Ахэмэ Тэ Шъо; Kbd: Абыхэм Дэ Фэ	Pst.	Тыкъышъуатгъ	Дыкъыфатащ	Дыкъыфитащ	They gave us to y'all
Ady: Ахэмэ Тэ Ащ; Kbd: Абыхэм Дэ Абы	Pres.	Траты	Дырат	Дрет	They give us to him
Ady: Ахэмэ Тэ Ащ; Kbd: Абыхэм Дэ Абы	Pst.	Тратгъ	Дыратащ	Дыритащ	They gave us to him
Ady: Ахэмэ Тэ Ахэмэ; Kbd: Абыхэм Дэ Абыхэм	Pres.	Тараты	Дарат	Дрет	They give us to them
Ady: Ахэмэ Тэ Ахэмэ; Kbd: Абыхэм Дэ Абыхэм	Pst.	Таратгъ	Даратащ	Дыритащ	They gave us to them
Ady: Ахэмэ О Сэ; Kbd: Абыхэм Уэ Сэ	Pres.	Укъысаты	Укъызат	Укъызет	They give you to me
Ady: Ахэмэ О Сэ; Kbd: Абыхэм Уэ Сэ	Pst.	Укъысатгъ	Укъызатащ	Укъыситащ	They gave you to me
Ady: Ахэмэ О Тэ; Kbd: Абыхэм Уэ Дэ	Pres.	Укъытаты	Укъыдат	Укъыдет	They give you to us
Ady: Ахэмэ О Тэ; Kbd: Абыхэм Уэ Дэ	Pst.	Укъытатгъ	Укъыдатащ	Укъыдитащ	They gave you to us
Ady: Ахэмэ О Ащ; Kbd: Абыхэм Уэ Абы	Pres.	Ураты	Урат	Урет	They give you to him
Ady: Ахэмэ О Ащ; Kbd: Абыхэм Уэ Абы	Pst.	Уратгъ	Уратащ	Уритащ	They gave you to him
Ady: Ахэмэ О Ахэмэ; Kbd: Абыхэм Уэ Абыхэм	Pres.	Уараты	Уарат	Урет	They give you to them
Ady: Ахэмэ О Ахэмэ; Kbd: Абыхэм Уэ Абыхэм	Pst.	Уаратгъ	Уаратащ	Уритащ	They gave you to them
Ady: Ахэмэ Шъо Сэ; Kbd: Абыхэм Фэ Сэ	Pres.	Шъукъысаты	Фыкъызат	Фыкъызет	They give y'all to me
Ady: Ахэмэ Шъо Сэ; Kbd: Абыхэм Фэ Сэ	Pst.	Шъукъысатгъ	Фыкъызатащ	Фыкъыситащ	They gave y'all to me
Ady: Ахэмэ Шъо Тэ; Kbd: Абыхэм Фэ Дэ	Pres.	Шъукъытаты	Фыкъыдат	Фыкъыдет	They give y'all to us
Ady: Ахэмэ Шъо Тэ; Kbd: Абыхэм Фэ Дэ	Pst.	Шъукъытатгъ	Фыкъыдатащ	Фыкъыдитащ	They gave y'all to us
Ady: Ахэмэ Шъо Ащ; Kbd: Абыхэм Фэ Абы	Pres.	Шъураты	Фырат	Фрет	They give y'all to him
Ady: Ахэмэ Шъо Ащ; Kbd: Абыхэм Фэ Абы	Pst.	Шъуратгъ	Фыратащ	Фритащ	They gave y'all to him
Ady: Ахэмэ Шъо Ахэмэ; Kbd: Абыхэм Фэ Абыхэм	Pres.	Шъуараты	Фарат	Фрет	They give y'all to them
Ady: Ахэмэ Шъо Ахэмэ; Kbd: Абыхэм Фэ Абыхэм	Pst.	Шъуаратгъ	Фаратащ	Фритащ	They gave y'all to them
Ady: Ахэмэ Ар Сэ; Kbd: Абыхэм Ар Сэ	Pres.	Къысаты	Къызат	Къызет	They give him to me
Ady: Ахэмэ Ар Сэ; Kbd: Абыхэм Ар Сэ	Pst.	Къысатгъ	Къызатащ	Къыситащ	They gave him to me
Ady: Ахэмэ Ар Тэ; Kbd: Абыхэм Ар Дэ	Pres.	Къытаты	Къыдат	Къыдет	They give him to us
Ady: Ахэмэ Ар Тэ; Kbd: Абыхэм Ар Дэ	Pst.	Къытатгъ	Къыдатащ	Къыдитащ	They gave him to us
Ady: Ахэмэ Ар О Kbd: Абыхэм Ар Уэ	Pres.	Къыуаты	Къыуат	Къыует	They give him to you
Ady: Ахэмэ Ар О Kbd: Абыхэм Ар Уэ	Pst.	Къыуатгъ	Къыуатащ	Къыуитащ	They gave him to you
Ady: Ахэмэ Ар Шъо; Kbd: Абыхэм Ар Фэ	Pres.	Къышъуаты	Къыват	Къывет	They give him to y'all
Ady: Ахэмэ Ар Шъо; Kbd: Абыхэм Ар Фэ	Pst.	Къышъуатгъ	Къыфатащ	Къыфитащ	They gave him to y'all
Ady: Ахэмэ Ар Ащ; Kbd: Абыхэм Ар Абы	Pres.	Раты	Ират	Ирет	They give him to him
Ady: Ахэмэ Ар Ащ; Kbd: Абыхэм Ар Абы	Pst.	Ратгъ	Иратащ	Иритащ	They gave him to him
Ady: Ахэмэ Ар Ахэмэ; Kbd: Абыхэм Ар Абыхэм	Pres.	Араты	Ярат	Ирет	They give him to them
Ady: Ахэмэ Ар Ахэмэ; Kbd: Абыхэм Ар Абыхэм	Pst.	Аратгъ	Яратащ	Иритащ	They gave him to them
Ady: Ахэмэ Ахэр Сэ; Kbd: Абыхэм Ахэр Сэ	Pres.	Къысатых	Къызатыхэ	Къызет	They give them to me
Ady: Ахэмэ Ахэр Сэ; Kbd: Абыхэм Ахэр Сэ	Pst.	Къысатгъэх	Къызатахэщ	Къыситащ	They gave them to me
Ady: Ахэмэ Ахэр Тэ; Kbd: Абыхэм Ахэр Дэ	Pres.	Къытатых	Къыдатыхэ	Къыдет	They give them to us
Ady: Ахэмэ Ахэр Тэ; Kbd: Абыхэм Ахэр Дэ	Pst.	Къытатгъэх	Къыдатахэщ	Къыдитащ	They gave them to us
Ady: Ахэмэ Ахэр О Kbd: Абыхэм Ахэр Уэ	Pres.	Къыуатых	Къыуатыхэ	Къыует	They give them to you
Ady: Ахэмэ Ахэр О Kbd: Абыхэм Ахэр Уэ	Pst.	Къыуатгъэх	Къыуатахэщ	Къыуитащ	They gave them to you
Ady: Ахэмэ Ахэр Шъо; Kbd: Абыхэм Ахэр Фэ	Pres.	Къышъуатых	Къыватыхэ	Къывет	They give them to y'all
Ady: Ахэмэ Ахэр Шъо; Kbd: Абыхэм Ахэр Фэ	Pst.	Къышъуатгъэх	Къыфатахэщ	Къыфитащ	They gave them to y'all
Ady: Ахэмэ Ахэр Ащ; Kbd: Абыхэм Ахэр Абы	Pres.	Ратых	Иратыхэ	Ирет	They give them to him
Ady: Ахэмэ Ахэр Ащ; Kbd: Абыхэм Ахэр Абы	Pst.	Ратгъэх	Иратахэщ	Иритащ	They gave them to him
Ady: Ахэмэ Ахэр Ахэмэ; Kbd: Абыхэм Ахэр Абыхэм	Pres.	Аратых	Яратыхэ	Ирет	They give them to them
Ady: Ахэмэ Ахэр Ахэмэ; Kbd: Абыхэм Ахэр Абыхэм	Pst.	Аратгъэх	Яратахэщ	Иритащ	They gave them to them

=== The hidden Oblique prefix: Adyghe vs. Kabardian ===
Once the linking -р- is inserted, the two languages treat the 3rd-person singular oblique differently. Kabardian keeps it visible: "he gives it to him" is Иреты / Ирет (Ø·и·ре·т). Standard Adyghe drops the word-initial oblique, giving Реты (Ø·Ø·ре·ты) — probably from an older *ыреты, the weak ы eliding word-initially.

The deletion is only word-initial. When a preceding prefix protects the 3SG oblique, its slot survives: with the cislocative къыреты (not *къреты); with 1SG/2SG absolutives сыреты "he gives me to him", уреты "he gives you to him". The plural oblique а- never drops: ареты, къареты, сареты, уареты. The same holds for all trivalent roots, e.g. ехьыл1эн "to carry to" → рехьыл1э.

Kabardian vs. Adyghe: visibility of the 3SG oblique before linking -р-
Underlying structure	Kabardian	Adyghe	Translation
Ø · и · р · е · ты	Иреты	Реты	He gives it to him
Ø · и · р · а · ты	Ираты	Раты	They give it to him
Ø · я · р · е · ты (plural OBL)	Яреты	Ареты	He gives it to them
Ø · я · р · а · ты (plural OBL + ERG)	Яраты	Араты	They give it to them
Ø · и · р · е · хьыл1э	Ирехьыл1э	Рехьыл1э	It concerns him

=== Number in modern Kabardian ===
Modern Kabardian marks no 3rd-person plural on the verb for any of the three arguments — agent, theme, recipient — using the singular throughout and carrying plurality on the free pronouns (абыхэм, ахэр). "They give them to them" uses the singular ирет (= "he gives it to him"). The я- / -ра- / -хэ forms in the Proto-Kabardian column above are the older ones; the more arguments are plural, the more collapse onto the singular at once:

Archaic vs. modern Kabardian (trivalent)
Proto- Kabardian	Plurals	Modern Kabardian	English
Язот	3P OBL → 3S OBL	Изот	I give it to them
Ястащ	3P OBL → 3S OBL	Естащ	I gave it to them
Ярат	3P ERG → 3S ERG; 3P OBL → 3S OBL	Ирет	they give it to them
Яратхэ	3P ERG → 3S ERG; 3P ABS → 3S ABS; 3P OBL → 3S OBL	Ирет	they give them to them

=== Adyghe Variants ===
Gathered here are the Adyghe alternants held back — the я-series (3PL recipient) and dialectal -бэ- (2SG agent); the Standard column repeats the main-table form, and a dash marks no Adyghe variant for that row. (Kabardian has no variants of its own — its older number-distinguishing forms are the Proto-Kabardian column in the main table; see Number in modern Kabardian.)

Adyghe variants — я-series (3PL recipient) and dialectal -бэ- (2SG agent)
config ERG-ABS-OBL	Tense	Adyghe Standard	Adyghe Variants	English
Ady: Сэ о ахэм Kbd: Сэ уэ абыхэм	Pres.	Уасэты	Уясэты	I give you to them
Ady: Сэ о ахэм Kbd: Сэ уэ абыхэм	Pst.	Уастыгъ	Уястыгъ	I gave you to them
Ady: Сэ ар ахэм Kbd: Сэ ар абыхэм	Pres.	Асэты	Ясэты	I give it to them
Ady: Сэ ар ахэм Kbd: Сэ ар абыхэм	Pst.	Астыгъ	Ястыгъ	I gave it to them
Ady: Сэ шъо ахэм Kbd: Сэ фэ абыхэм	Pres.	Шъуасэты	Шъуясэты	I give y'all to them
Ady: Сэ шъо ахэм Kbd: Сэ фэ абыхэм	Pst.	Шъуастыгъ	Шъуястыгъ	I gave y'all to them
Ady: Сэ ахэр ахэм Kbd: Сэ ахэр абыхэм	Pres.	Асэтых	Ясэтых	I give them to them
Ady: Сэ ахэр ахэм Kbd: Сэ ахэр абыхэм	Pst.	Астыгъэх	Ястыгъэх	I gave them to them
Ady: О сэ ащ Kbd: Уэ сэ абы	Pres.	Сеоты	Себэты; Сыкъебэты	You give me to him
Ady: О сэ ащ Kbd: Уэ сэ абы	Pst.	Септыгъ	—	You gave me to him
Ady: О сэ ахэм Kbd: Уэ сэ абыхэм	Pres.	Саоты	Сяоты; Сабэты; Сыкъабэты	You give me to them
Ady: О сэ ахэм Kbd: Уэ сэ абыхэм	Pst.	Саптыгъ	Сяптыгъ	You gave me to them
Ady: О ар сэ Kbd: Уэ ар сэ	Pres.	—	Къысэбэты	You give it to me
Ady: О ар сэ Kbd: Уэ ар сэ	Pst.	—	—	You gave it to me
Ady: О ар ащ Kbd: Уэ ар абы	Pres.	Еоты	Ебэты; Къебэты	You give it to him
Ady: О ар ащ Kbd: Уэ ар абы	Pst.	Ептыгъ	—	You gave it to him
Ady: О ар тэ Kbd: Уэ ар дэ	Pres.	—	Къытэбэты	You give it to us
Ady: О ар тэ Kbd: Уэ ар дэ	Pst.	—	—	You gave it to us
Ady: О ар ахэм Kbd: Уэ ар абыхэм	Pres.	Аоты	Яоты; Абэты; Ябэты; Къабэты	You give it to them
Ady: О ар ахэм Kbd: Уэ ар абыхэм	Pst.	Аптыгъ	Яптыгъ	You gave it to them
Ady: О тэ ащ Kbd: Уэ дэ абы	Pres.	Теоты	Тебэты; Тыкъебэты	You give us to him
Ady: О тэ ащ Kbd: Уэ дэ абы	Pst.	Тептыгъ	—	You gave us to him
Ady: О тэ ахэм Kbd: Уэ дэ абыхэм	Pres.	Таоты	Тяоты; Табэты; Тыкъабэты	You give us to them
Ady: О тэ ахэм Kbd: Уэ дэ абыхэм	Pst.	Таптыгъ	Тяптыгъ	You gave us to them
Ady: О ахэр сэ Kbd: Уэ ахэр сэ	Pres.	—	Къысэбэтых	You give them to me
Ady: О ахэр сэ Kbd: Уэ ахэр сэ	Pst.	—	—	You gave them to me
Ady: О ахэр ащ Kbd: Уэ ахэр абы	Pres.	Еотых	Ебэтых; Къебэтых	You give them to him
Ady: О ахэр ащ Kbd: Уэ ахэр абы	Pst.	Ептыгъэх	—	You gave them to him
Ady: О ахэр тэ Kbd: Уэ ахэр дэ	Pres.	—	Къытэбэтых	You give them to us
Ady: О ахэр тэ Kbd: Уэ ахэр дэ	Pst.	—	—	You gave them to us
Ady: О ахэр ахэм Kbd: Уэ ахэр абыхэм	Pres.	Аотых	Яотых; Абэтых; Ябэтых; Къабэтых	You give them to them
Ady: О ахэр ахэм Kbd: Уэ ахэр абыхэм	Pst.	Аптыгъэх	Яптыгъэх	You gave them to them
Ady: Ащ сэ ахэм Kbd: Абы сэ абыхэм	Pres.	Сареты	Сяреты	He gives me to them
Ady: Ащ сэ ахэм Kbd: Абы сэ абыхэм	Pst.	Саритыгъ	Сяритыгъ	He gave me to them
Ady: Ащ о ахэм Kbd: Абы уэ абыхэм	Pres.	Уареты	Уяреты	He gives you to them
Ady: Ащ о ахэм Kbd: Абы уэ абыхэм	Pst.	Уаритыгъ	Уяритыгъ	He gave you to them
Ady: Ащ ар ахэм Kbd: Абы ар абыхэм	Pres.	Ареты	Яреты	He gives it to them
Ady: Ащ ар ахэм Kbd: Абы ар абыхэм	Pst.	Аритыгъ	Яритыгъ	He gave it to them
Ady: Ащ тэ ахэм Kbd: Абы дэ абыхэм	Pres.	Тареты	Тяреты	He gives us to them
Ady: Ащ тэ ахэм Kbd: Абы дэ абыхэм	Pst.	Таритыгъ	Тяритыгъ	He gave us to them
Ady: Ащ шъо ахэм Kbd: Абы фэ абыхэм	Pres.	Шъуареты	Шъуяреты	He gives y'all to them
Ady: Ащ шъо ахэм Kbd: Абы фэ абыхэм	Pst.	Шъуаритыгъ	Шъуяритыгъ	He gave y'all to them
Ady: Ащ ахэр ахэм Kbd: Абы ахэр абыхэм	Pres.	Аретых	Яретых	He gives them to them
Ady: Ащ ахэр ахэм Kbd: Абы ахэр абыхэм	Pst.	Аритыгъэх	Яритыгъэх	He gave them to them
Ady: Тэ о ахэм Kbd: Дэ уэ абыхэм	Pres.	Уатэты	Уятэты	We give you to them
Ady: Тэ о ахэм Kbd: Дэ уэ абыхэм	Pst.	Уаттыгъ	Уяттыгъ	We gave you to them
Ady: Тэ ар ахэм Kbd: Дэ ар абыхэм	Pres.	Атэты	Ятэты	We give it to them
Ady: Тэ ар ахэм Kbd: Дэ ар абыхэм	Pst.	Аттыгъ	Яттыгъ	We gave it to them
Ady: Тэ шъо ахэм Kbd: Дэ фэ абыхэм	Pres.	Шъуатэты	Шъуятэты	We give y'all to them
Ady: Тэ шъо ахэм Kbd: Дэ фэ абыхэм	Pst.	Шъуаттыгъ	Шъуяттыгъ	We gave y'all to them
Ady: Тэ ахэр ахэм Kbd: Дэ ахэр абыхэм	Pres.	Атэтых	Ятэтых	We give them to them
Ady: Тэ ахэр ахэм Kbd: Дэ ахэр абыхэм	Pst.	Аттыгъэх	Яттыгъэх	We gave them to them
Ady: Шъо сэ ахэм Kbd: Фэ сэ абыхэм	Pres.	Сашъоты	Сяшъоты	Y'all give me to them
Ady: Шъо сэ ахэм Kbd: Фэ сэ абыхэм	Pst.	Сашъутыгъ	Сяшъутыгъ	Y'all gave me to them
Ady: Шъо ар ахэм Kbd: Фэ ар абыхэм	Pres.	Ашъоты	Яшъоты	Y'all give it to them
Ady: Шъо ар ахэм Kbd: Фэ ар абыхэм	Pst.	Ашъутыгъ	Яшъутыгъ	Y'all gave it to them
Ady: Шъо тэ ахэм Kbd: Фэ дэ абыхэм	Pres.	Ташъоты	Тяшъоты	Y'all give us to them
Ady: Шъо тэ ахэм Kbd: Фэ дэ абыхэм	Pst.	Ташъутыгъ	Тяшъутыгъ	Y'all gave us to them
Ady: Шъо ахэр ахэм Kbd: Фэ ахэр абыхэм	Pres.	Ашъотых	Яшъотых	Y'all give them to them
Ady: Шъо ахэр ахэм Kbd: Фэ ахэр абыхэм	Pst.	Ашъутыгъэх	Яшъутыгъэх	Y'all gave them to them
Ady: Ахэм сэ ахэм Kbd: Абыхэм сэ абыхэм	Pres.	Сараты	Сяраты	They give me to them
Ady: Ахэм сэ ахэм Kbd: Абыхэм сэ абыхэм	Pst.	Саратыгъ	Сяратыгъ	They gave me to them
Ady: Ахэм о ахэм Kbd: Абыхэм уэ абыхэм	Pres.	Уараты	Уяраты	They give you to them
Ady: Ахэм о ахэм Kbd: Абыхэм уэ абыхэм	Pst.	Уаратыгъ	Уяратыгъ	They gave you to them
Ady: Ахэм ар ахэм Kbd: Абыхэм ар абыхэм	Pres.	Араты	Яраты	They give it to them
Ady: Ахэм ар ахэм Kbd: Абыхэм ар абыхэм	Pst.	Аратыгъ	Яратыгъ	They gave it to them
Ady: Ахэм тэ ахэм Kbd: Абыхэм дэ абыхэм	Pres.	Тараты	Тяраты	They give us to them
Ady: Ахэм тэ ахэм Kbd: Абыхэм дэ абыхэм	Pst.	Таратыгъ	Тяратыгъ	They gave us to them
Ady: Ахэм шъо ахэм Kbd: Абыхэм фэ абыхэм	Pres.	Шъуараты	Шъуяраты	They give y'all to them
Ady: Ахэм шъо ахэм Kbd: Абыхэм фэ абыхэм	Pst.	Шъуаратыгъ	Шъуяратыгъ	They gave y'all to them
Ady: Ахэм ахэр ахэм Kbd: Абыхэм ахэр абыхэм	Pres.	Аратых	Яратых	They give them to them
Ady: Ахэм ахэр ахэм Kbd: Абыхэм ахэр абыхэм	Pst.	Аратыгъэх	Яратыгъэх	They gave them to them

== Trivalent Ditransitive Reflexive Verbs conjugation ==
Reflexives are more intricate here than in bivalent verbs, because a ditransitive's three arguments — ergative agent, absolutive theme, oblique recipient — can compete for co-reference. Four patterns are logically possible (X = agent, Y = a distinct theme, Z = a distinct recipient):

1. X gives X to Z — the theme is co-referential with the agent ("I give myself to you"); the absolutive slot is reflexivised.
2. X gives Y to X — the recipient is co-referential with the agent ("I give you to myself"); the oblique slot is reflexivised, anchored on the agent.
3. X gives Y to Y — the recipient is co-referential with the theme, not the agent ("I give you to yourself"); the oblique is reflexivised, anchored on the theme.
4. X gives X to X — both theme and recipient are co-referential with the agent ("I give myself to myself"); both slots are reflexivised.

Patterns 1 and 3 are surface-identical in both languages, the intended reading recovered from context. The reflexive marker takes a different shape depending on which slot it lands in, and the verb adds the same refactive ("back-to-self") suffix as the bivalent reflexive:

Reflexive marker and refactive suffix (trivalent)
	in the ABS slot (left edge)	in the OBL slot (before the ergative)	Refactive suffix
Adyghe	зы-	зэ- / зы- / з-	-жьы
Kabardian	зы-	зэ- / зы- / з-	-ыж

Two further regularities, both inherited from the plain trivalent. With a 3rd-person agent the linking -р- appears (3sg -ре-, past -ри-; 3pl -ра-). And in Kabardian the present -о- fuses with the ergative (зо-, бо-, до-, во-), while the past drops it, devoices the ergative (з→с, б→п, в→ф) and adds -ащ (→ -ахэщ with the absolutive plural -хэ).

As everywhere, Kabardian collapses the 3sg/3pl distinction in the modern (Plain) forms; the older plural markers — absolutive -хэ, ergative -ра-, oblique я- — are the Kabardian Base for the plural (the oblique я- never surfaces here, since it would need to be word-initial but the absolutive slot is always filled).

The four patterns contrast cleanly with the ergative held at 1sg ("I"):

The four reflexive patterns, present tense, ergative = 1sg (I)
Pattern	Adyghe	Kabardian	English
Pattern 1 — absolutive reflexive	Зыосэтыжьы	Зыуэзотыж	I give myself to you
Pattern 2 — oblique reflexive (coref agent)	Узэсэтыжьы	Бзызотыж / Узызотыж	I give you to myself
Pattern 3 — oblique reflexive (coref theme)	Зыосэтыжьы	Зыуэзотыж	I give you to yourself
Pattern 4 — both slots reflexive	Зызэсэтыжьы	Зызызотыж	I give myself to myself

The linking «-р-» is a separator, not a personal prefix. The -р- inside -ре-/-ра- merely keeps the two adjacent 3rd-person vowel prefixes (recipient and ergative) from coalescing, so it appears only when both recipient and agent are 3rd person. With a 1st/2nd-person recipient there is no second 3rd-person prefix and no -р- — the starred forms are wrong:

- Adyghe: ✗ *Зысретыжьы → ✓ Зысетыжьы "A gives A to me"; ✗ *Зыуретыжьы → ✓ Зыуетыжьы "…to you". It does appear with a 3rd-person recipient: Зыретыжьы "A gives A to B", Заретыжьы "…to B-s".
- Kabardian: ✗ *Зысретыж → ✓ Зызетыж "A gives A to me"; ✗ *Зыуэретыж → ✓ Зыуетыж "…to you". It appears with a 3rd-person recipient: Зызыретыж "A gives A to B" / "A gives B to A".

In the config column the three pronouns are listed agent — theme — recipient; a repeated personal pronoun marks 1st/2nd-person co-reference with the agent, Adyghe ежь / Kabardian езым marks 3rd-person reflexive co-reference, and a parenthetical annotation spells out the A (agent or its coreferent) / B, C (distinct 3rd persons) pattern where needed. Plural participants are written A-s, B-s, C-s. Where Adyghe shows —, the source did not separately list that (surface-syncretic) configuration.

The three language columns are Modern Adyghe, Proto-Kabardian and Modern Kabardian. Adyghe is conservative, so one column suffices; Proto-Kabardian keeps the older number distinctions, while Modern Kabardian collapses every 3rd-person plural to the singular (number then resting on the free pronouns ахэр / абыхэм). The two Kabardian columns therefore differ only in the 3PL cells — see Number in modern Kabardian below for the exact forms.

Conjugation of етын / етын (to give) — present and past tense
Config	Tense	Modern Adyghe	Proto- Kabardian	Modern Kabardian	English
Subject: 1st Person Singular — Ady Сэ / Kbd Сэ
Ady: Сэ Сэ Сэ; Kbd: Сэ Сэ Сэ	Pres.	Зызэсэтыжьы	Зызызотыж	Зызызотыж	I give myself to myself
Ady: Сэ Сэ Сэ; Kbd: Сэ Сэ Сэ	Pst.	Зызэстыжьыгъ	Зызыстыжащ	Зызыстыжащ	I gave myself to myself
Ady: Сэ Сэ О Kbd: Сэ Сэ Уэ	Pres.	Зыосэтыжьы	Зыузотыж	Зыузотыж	I give myself to you
Ady: Сэ Сэ О Kbd: Сэ Сэ Уэ	Pst.	Зыостыжьыгъ	Зыустыжащ	Зыустыжащ	I gave myself to you
Ady: Сэ Сэ Шъо; Kbd: Сэ Сэ Фэ	Pres.	Зышъосэтыжьы	Зыфызотыж	Зыфызотыж	I give myself to y'all
Ady: Сэ Сэ Шъо; Kbd: Сэ Сэ Фэ	Pst.	Зышъостыжьыгъ	Зыфыстыжащ	Зыфыстыжащ	I gave myself to y'all
Ady: Сэ Сэ Ащ; Kbd: Сэ Сэ Абы	Pres.	Зесэтыжьы	Зезотыж	Зезотыж	I give myself to him
Ady: Сэ Сэ Ащ; Kbd: Сэ Сэ Абы	Pst.	Зестыжьыгъ	Зестыжащ	Зестыжащ	I gave myself to him
Ady: Сэ Сэ Ахэмэ; Kbd: Сэ Сэ Абыхэм	Pres.	Засэтыжьы	Зазотыж	Зезотыж	I give myself to them
Ady: Сэ Сэ Ахэмэ; Kbd: Сэ Сэ Абыхэм	Pst.	Застыжьыгъ	Застыжащ	Зестыжащ	I gave myself to them
Ady: Сэ О Сэ; Kbd: Сэ Уэ Сэ	Pres.	Узэсэтыжьы	Узызотыж	Узызотыж	I give you to myself
Ady: Сэ О Сэ; Kbd: Сэ Уэ Сэ	Pst.	Узэстыжьыгъ	Узыстыжащ	Узыстыжащ	I gave you to myself
Ady: Сэ О О Kbd: Сэ Уэ Уэ	Pres.	Зыосэтыжьы	Зыузотыж	Зыузотыж	I give you to yourself
Ady: Сэ О О Kbd: Сэ Уэ Уэ	Pst.	Зыостыжьыгъ	Зыустыжащ	Зыустыжащ	I gave you to yourself
Ady: Сэ Шъо Сэ; Kbd: Сэ Фэ Сэ	Pres.	Шъузэсэтыжьы	Фызызотыж	Фызызотыж	I give y'all to myself
Ady: Сэ Шъо Сэ; Kbd: Сэ Фэ Сэ	Pst.	Шъузэстыжьыгъ	Фызыстыжащ	Фызыстыжащ	I gave y'all to myself
Ady: Сэ Шъо Шъо; Kbd: Сэ Фэ Фэ	Pres.	Зышъосэтыжьы	Зыфызотыж	Зыфызотыж	I give y'all to yourselves
Ady: Сэ Шъо Шъо; Kbd: Сэ Фэ Фэ	Pst.	Зышъостыжьыгъ	Зыфыстыжащ	Зыфыстыжащ	I gave y'all to yourselves
Ady: Сэ Ар Сэ; Kbd: Сэ Ар Сэ	Pres.	Зэсэтыжьы	Зызызотыж	Зызызотыж	I give him to myself
Ady: Сэ Ар Сэ; Kbd: Сэ Ар Сэ	Pst.	Зэстыжьыгъ	Зызыстыжащ	Зызыстыжащ	I gave him to myself
Ady: Сэ Ар Ащ; Kbd: Сэ Ар Абы	Pres.	Зесэтыжьы	Зезотыж	Зезотыж	I give him to himself
Ady: Сэ Ар Ащ; Kbd: Сэ Ар Абы	Pst.	Зестыжьыгъ	Зестыжащ	Зестыжащ	I gave him to himself
Ady: Сэ Ахэр Сэ; Kbd: Сэ Ахэр Сэ	Pres.	Зэсэтыжьых	Зызызотыжхэ	Зызызотыж	I give them to myself
Ady: Сэ Ахэр Сэ; Kbd: Сэ Ахэр Сэ	Pst.	Зэстыжьыгъэх	Зызыстыжахэщ	Зызыстыжащ	I gave them to myself
Ady: Сэ Ахэр Ахэмэ; Kbd: Сэ Ахэр Абыхэм	Pres.	Засэтыжьых	Зазотыжхэ	Зезотыж	I give them to themselves
Ady: Сэ Ахэр Ахэмэ; Kbd: Сэ Ахэр Абыхэм	Pst.	Застыжьыгъэх	Застыжахэщ	Зестыжащ	I gave them to themselves
Subject: 1st Person Plural — Ady Тэ / Kbd Дэ
Ady: Тэ Тэ Тэ; Kbd: Дэ Дэ Дэ	Pres.	Зызэтэтыжьы	Зызыдотыж	Зызыдотыж	We give ourselves to ourselves
Ady: Тэ Тэ Тэ; Kbd: Дэ Дэ Дэ	Pst.	Зызэттыжьыгъ	Зызыдтыжащ	Зызыдтыжащ	We gave ourselves to ourselves
Ady: Тэ Тэ О Kbd: Дэ Дэ Уэ	Pres.	Зыотэтыжьы	Зыудотыж	Зыудотыж	We give ourselves to you
Ady: Тэ Тэ О Kbd: Дэ Дэ Уэ	Pst.	Зыоттыжьыгъ	Зыудтыжащ	Зыудтыжащ	We gave ourselves to you
Ady: Тэ Тэ Шъо; Kbd: Дэ Дэ Фэ	Pres.	Зышъотэтыжьы	Зыфыдотыж	Зыфыдотыж	We give ourselves to y'all
Ady: Тэ Тэ Шъо; Kbd: Дэ Дэ Фэ	Pst.	Зышъоттыжьыгъ	Зыфыдтыжащ	Зыфыдтыжащ	We gave ourselves to y'all
Ady: Тэ Тэ Ащ; Kbd: Дэ Дэ Абы	Pres.	Зетэтыжьы	Зедотыж	Зедотыж	We give ourselves to him
Ady: Тэ Тэ Ащ; Kbd: Дэ Дэ Абы	Pst.	Зеттыжьыгъ	Зедтыжащ	Зедтыжащ	We gave ourselves to him
Ady: Тэ Тэ Ахэмэ; Kbd: Дэ Дэ Абыхэм	Pres.	Затэтыжьы	Задотыж	Зедотыж	We give ourselves to them
Ady: Тэ Тэ Ахэмэ; Kbd: Дэ Дэ Абыхэм	Pst.	Заттыжьыгъ	Задтыжащ	Зедтыжащ	We gave ourselves to them
Ady: Тэ О Тэ; Kbd: Дэ Уэ Дэ	Pres.	Узэтэтыжьы	Узыдотыж	Узыдотыж	We give you to ourselves
Ady: Тэ О Тэ; Kbd: Дэ Уэ Дэ	Pst.	Узэттыжьыгъ	Узыдтыжащ	Узыдтыжащ	We gave you to ourselves
Ady: Тэ О О Kbd: Дэ Уэ Уэ	Pres.	Зыотэтыжьы	Зыудотыж	Зыудотыж	We give you to yourself
Ady: Тэ О О Kbd: Дэ Уэ Уэ	Pst.	Зыоттыжьыгъ	Зыудтыжащ	Зыудтыжащ	We gave you to yourself
Ady: Тэ Шъо Тэ; Kbd: Дэ Фэ Дэ	Pres.	Шъузэтэтыжьы	Фызыдотыж	Фызыдотыж	We give y'all to ourselves
Ady: Тэ Шъо Тэ; Kbd: Дэ Фэ Дэ	Pst.	Шъузэттыжьыгъ	Фызыдтыжащ	Фызыдтыжащ	We gave y'all to ourselves
Ady: Тэ Шъо Шъо; Kbd: Дэ Фэ Фэ	Pres.	Зышъотэтыжьы	Зыфыдотыж	Зыфыдотыж	We give y'all to yourselves
Ady: Тэ Шъо Шъо; Kbd: Дэ Фэ Фэ	Pst.	Зышъоттыжьыгъ	Зыфыдтыжащ	Зыфыдтыжащ	We gave y'all to yourselves
Ady: Тэ Ар Тэ; Kbd: Дэ Ар Дэ	Pres.	Зэтэтыжьы	Зызыдотыж	Зызыдотыж	We give him to ourselves
Ady: Тэ Ар Тэ; Kbd: Дэ Ар Дэ	Pst.	Зэттыжьыгъ	Зызыдтыжащ	Зызыдтыжащ	We gave him to ourselves
Ady: Тэ Ар Ащ; Kbd: Дэ Ар Абы	Pres.	Зетэтыжьы	Зедотыж	Зедотыж	We give him to himself
Ady: Тэ Ар Ащ; Kbd: Дэ Ар Абы	Pst.	Зеттыжьыгъ	Зедтыжащ	Зедтыжащ	We gave him to himself
Ady: Тэ Ахэр Тэ; Kbd: Дэ Ахэр Дэ	Pres.	Зэтэтыжьых	Зызыдотыжхэ	Зызыдотыж	We give them to ourselves
Ady: Тэ Ахэр Тэ; Kbd: Дэ Ахэр Дэ	Pst.	Зэттыжьыгъэх	Зызыдтыжахэщ	Зызыдтыжащ	We gave them to ourselves
Ady: Тэ Ахэр Ахэмэ; Kbd: Дэ Ахэр Абыхэм	Pres.	Затэтыжьых	Задотыжхэ	Зедотыж	We give them to themselves
Ady: Тэ Ахэр Ахэмэ; Kbd: Дэ Ахэр Абыхэм	Pst.	Заттыжьыгъэх	Задтыжахэщ	Зедтыжащ	We gave them to themselves
Subject: 2nd Person Singular — Ady О / Kbd Уэ
Ady: О Сэ Сэ; Kbd: Уэ Сэ Сэ	Pres.	Зысэотыжьы	Зызыботыж	Зызыботыж	You give me to myself
Ady: О Сэ Сэ; Kbd: Уэ Сэ Сэ	Pst.	Зысэптыжьыгъ	Зызыптыжащ	Зызыптыжащ	You gave me to myself
Ady: О Сэ О Kbd: Уэ Сэ Уэ	Pres.	Сызэотыжьы	Зызыботыж	Зызыботыж	You give me to yourself
Ady: О Сэ О Kbd: Уэ Сэ Уэ	Pst.	Сызэптыжьыгъ	Зызыптыжащ	Зызыптыжащ	You gave me to yourself
Ady: О Тэ Тэ; Kbd: Уэ Дэ Дэ	Pres.	Зытэотыжьы	Зыдыботыж	Зыдыботыж	You give us to ourselves
Ady: О Тэ Тэ; Kbd: Уэ Дэ Дэ	Pst.	Зытэптыжьыгъ	Зыдыптыжащ	Зыдыптыжащ	You gave us to ourselves
Ady: О Тэ О Kbd: Уэ Дэ Уэ	Pres.	Тызэотыжьы	Дызыботыж	Дызыботыж	You give us to yourself
Ady: О Тэ О Kbd: Уэ Дэ Уэ	Pst.	Тызэптыжьыгъ	Дызыптыжащ	Дызыптыжащ	You gave us to yourself
Ady: О О Сэ; Kbd: Уэ Уэ Сэ	Pres.	Зысэотыжьы	Зызыботыж	Зызыботыж	You give yourself to me
Ady: О О Сэ; Kbd: Уэ Уэ Сэ	Pst.	Зысэптыжьыгъ	Зызыптыжащ	Зызыптыжащ	You gave yourself to me
Ady: О О Тэ; Kbd: Уэ Уэ Дэ	Pres.	Зытэотыжьы	Зыдыботыж	Зыдыботыж	You give yourself to us
Ady: О О Тэ; Kbd: Уэ Уэ Дэ	Pst.	Зытэптыжьыгъ	Зыдыптыжащ	Зыдыптыжащ	You gave yourself to us
Ady: О О О Kbd: Уэ Уэ Уэ	Pres.	Зызэотыжьы	Зызыботыж	Зызыботыж	You give yourself to yourself
Ady: О О О Kbd: Уэ Уэ Уэ	Pst.	Зызэптыжьыгъ	Зызыптыжащ	Зызыптыжащ	You gave yourself to yourself
Ady: О О Ащ; Kbd: Уэ Уэ Абы	Pres.	Зеотыжьы	Зеботыж	Зеботыж	You give yourself to him
Ady: О О Ащ; Kbd: Уэ Уэ Абы	Pst.	Зептыжьыгъ	Зептыжащ	Зептыжащ	You gave yourself to him
Ady: О О Ахэмэ; Kbd: Уэ Уэ Абыхэм	Pres.	Заотыжьы	Заботыж	Зеботыж	You give yourself to them
Ady: О О Ахэмэ; Kbd: Уэ Уэ Абыхэм	Pst.	Заптыжьыгъ	Заптыжащ	Зептыжащ	You gave yourself to them
Ady: О Ар О Kbd: Уэ Ар Уэ	Pres.	Зэотыжьы	Зызыботыж	Зызыботыж	You give him to yourself
Ady: О Ар О Kbd: Уэ Ар Уэ	Pst.	Зэптыжьыгъ	Зызыптыжащ	Зызыптыжащ	You gave him to yourself
Ady: О Ар Ащ; Kbd: Уэ Ар Абы	Pres.	Зеотыжьы	Зеботыж	Зеботыж	You give him to himself
Ady: О Ар Ащ; Kbd: Уэ Ар Абы	Pst.	Зептыжьыгъ	Зептыжащ	Зептыжащ	You gave him to himself
Ady: О Ахэр О Kbd: Уэ Ахэр Уэ	Pres.	Зэотыжьых	Зызыботыжхэ	Зызыботыж	You give them to yourself
Ady: О Ахэр О Kbd: Уэ Ахэр Уэ	Pst.	Зэптыжьыгъэх	Зызыптыжахэщ	Зызыптыжащ	You gave them to yourself
Ady: О Ахэр Ахэмэ; Kbd: Уэ Ахэр Абыхэм	Pres.	Заотыжьых	Заботыжхэ	Зеботыж	You give them to themselves
Ady: О Ахэр Ахэмэ; Kbd: Уэ Ахэр Абыхэм	Pst.	Заптыжьыгъэх	Заптыжахэщ	Зептыжащ	You gave them to themselves
Subject: 2nd Person Plural — Ady Шъо / Kbd Фэ
Ady: Шъо Сэ Сэ; Kbd: Фэ Сэ Сэ	Pres.	Зысэшъотыжьы	Зызывотыж	Зызывотыж	Y'all give me to myself
Ady: Шъо Сэ Сэ; Kbd: Фэ Сэ Сэ	Pst.	Зысэшъутыжьыгъ	Зызыфтыжащ	Зызыфтыжащ	Y'all gave me to myself
Ady: Шъо Сэ Шъо; Kbd: Фэ Сэ Фэ	Pres.	Сызэшъотыжьы	Зызывотыж	Зызывотыж	Y'all give me to yourselves
Ady: Шъо Сэ Шъо; Kbd: Фэ Сэ Фэ	Pst.	Сызэшъутыжьыгъ	Зызыфтыжащ	Зызыфтыжащ	Y'all gave me to yourselves
Ady: Шъо Тэ Тэ; Kbd: Фэ Дэ Дэ	Pres.	Зытэшъотыжьы	Зыдывотыж	Зыдывотыж	Y'all give us to ourselves
Ady: Шъо Тэ Тэ; Kbd: Фэ Дэ Дэ	Pst.	Зытэшъутыжьыгъ	Зыдыфтыжащ	Зыдыфтыжащ	Y'all gave us to ourselves
Ady: Шъо Тэ Шъо; Kbd: Фэ Дэ Фэ	Pres.	Тызэшъотыжьы	Дызывотыж	Дызывотыж	Y'all give us to yourselves
Ady: Шъо Тэ Шъо; Kbd: Фэ Дэ Фэ	Pst.	Тызэшъутыжьыгъ	Дызыфтыжащ	Дызыфтыжащ	Y'all gave us to yourselves
Ady: Шъо Шъо Сэ; Kbd: Фэ Фэ Сэ	Pres.	Зысэшъотыжьы	Зызывотыж	Зызывотыж	Y'all give yourselves to me
Ady: Шъо Шъо Сэ; Kbd: Фэ Фэ Сэ	Pst.	Зысэшъутыжьыгъ	Зызыфтыжащ	Зызыфтыжащ	Y'all gave yourselves to me
Ady: Шъо Шъо Тэ; Kbd: Фэ Фэ Дэ	Pres.	Зытэшъотыжьы	Зыдывотыж	Зыдывотыж	Y'all give yourselves to us
Ady: Шъо Шъо Тэ; Kbd: Фэ Фэ Дэ	Pst.	Зытэшъутыжьыгъ	Зыдыфтыжащ	Зыдыфтыжащ	Y'all gave yourselves to us
Ady: Шъо Шъо Шъо; Kbd: Фэ Фэ Фэ	Pres.	Зызэшъотыжьы	Зызывотыж	Зызывотыж	Y'all give yourselves to yourselves
Ady: Шъо Шъо Шъо; Kbd: Фэ Фэ Фэ	Pst.	Зызэшъутыжьыгъ	Зызыфтыжащ	Зызыфтыжащ	Y'all gave yourselves to yourselves
Ady: Шъо Шъо Ащ; Kbd: Фэ Фэ Абы	Pres.	Зешъотыжьы	Зевотыж	Зевотыж	Y'all give yourselves to him
Ady: Шъо Шъо Ащ; Kbd: Фэ Фэ Абы	Pst.	Зешъутыжьыгъ	Зефтыжащ	Зефтыжащ	Y'all gave yourselves to him
Ady: Шъо Шъо Ахэмэ; Kbd: Фэ Фэ Абыхэм	Pres.	Зашъотыжьы	Завотыж	Зевотыж	Y'all give yourselves to them
Ady: Шъо Шъо Ахэмэ; Kbd: Фэ Фэ Абыхэм	Pst.	Зашъутыжьыгъ	Зафтыжащ	Зефтыжащ	Y'all gave yourselves to them
Ady: Шъо Ар Шъо; Kbd: Фэ Ар Фэ	Pres.	Зэшъотыжьы	Зызывотыж	Зызывотыж	Y'all give him to yourselves
Ady: Шъо Ар Шъо; Kbd: Фэ Ар Фэ	Pst.	Зэшъутыжьыгъ	Зызыфтыжащ	Зызыфтыжащ	Y'all gave him to yourselves
Ady: Шъо Ар Ащ; Kbd: Фэ Ар Абы	Pres.	Зешъотыжьы	Зевотыж	Зевотыж	Y'all give him to himself
Ady: Шъо Ар Ащ; Kbd: Фэ Ар Абы	Pst.	Зешъутыжьыгъ	Зефтыжащ	Зефтыжащ	Y'all gave him to himself
Ady: Шъо Ахэр Шъо; Kbd: Фэ Ахэр Фэ	Pres.	Зэшъотыжьых	Зызывотыжхэ	Зызывотыж	Y'all give them to yourselves
Ady: Шъо Ахэр Шъо; Kbd: Фэ Ахэр Фэ	Pst.	Зэшъутыжьыгъэх	Зызыфтыжахэщ	Зызыфтыжащ	Y'all gave them to yourselves
Ady: Шъо Ахэр Ахэмэ; Kbd: Фэ Ахэр Абыхэм	Pres.	Зашъотыжьых	Завотыжхэ	Зевотыж	Y'all give them to themselves
Ady: Шъо Ахэр Ахэмэ; Kbd: Фэ Ахэр Абыхэм	Pst.	Зашъутыжьыгъэх	Зафтыжахэщ	Зефтыжащ	Y'all gave them to themselves
Subject: 3rd Person Singular (Person A) — Ady Ащ / Kbd Абы
Ady: Ащ Сэ Сэ; Kbd: Абы Сэ Сэ	Pres.	Зысетыжьы	Зызетыж	Зызетыж	He gives me to myself
Ady: Ащ Сэ Сэ; Kbd: Абы Сэ Сэ	Pst.	Зыситыжьыгъ	Зызитыжащ	Зызитыжащ	He gave me to myself
Ady: Ащ Сэ Ащ; Kbd: Абы Сэ Абы	Pres.	Сызэретыжьы	Зызыретыж	Зызыретыж	He gives me to himself
Ady: Ащ Сэ Ащ; Kbd: Абы Сэ Абы	Pst.	Сызэритыжьыгъ	Зызыритыжащ	Зызыритыжащ	He gave me to himself
Ady: Ащ Тэ Тэ; Kbd: Абы Дэ Дэ	Pres.	Зытетыжьы	Зыдетыж	Зыдетыж	He gives us to ourselves
Ady: Ащ Тэ Тэ; Kbd: Абы Дэ Дэ	Pst.	Зытитыжьыгъ	Зыдитыжащ	Зыдитыжащ	He gave us to ourselves
Ady: Ащ Тэ Ащ; Kbd: Абы Дэ Абы	Pres.	Тызэретыжьы	Дызыретыж	Дызыретыж	He gives us to himself
Ady: Ащ Тэ Ащ; Kbd: Абы Дэ Абы	Pst.	Тызэритыжьыгъ	Дызыритыжащ	Дызыритыжащ	He gave us to himself
Ady: Ащ О О Kbd: Абы Уэ Уэ	Pres.	Зыуетыжьы	Зыуетыж	Зыуетыж	He gives you to yourself
Ady: Ащ О О Kbd: Абы Уэ Уэ	Pst.	Зыуитыжьыгъ	Зептыжащ	Зептыжащ	He gave you to yourself
Ady: Ащ О Ащ; Kbd: Абы Уэ Абы	Pres.	Узэретыжьы	Узыретыж	Узыретыж	He gives you to himself
Ady: Ащ О Ащ; Kbd: Абы Уэ Абы	Pst.	Узэритыжьыгъ	Узыритыжащ	Узыритыжащ	He gave you to himself
Ady: Ащ Шъо Шъо; Kbd: Абы Фэ Фэ	Pres.	Зышъуетыжьы	Зыветыж	Зыветыж	He gives y'all to yourselves
Ady: Ащ Шъо Шъо; Kbd: Абы Фэ Фэ	Pst.	Зышъуитыжьыгъ	Зывитыжащ	Зывитыжащ	He gave y'all to yourselves
Ady: Ащ Шъо Ащ; Kbd: Абы Фэ Абы	Pres.	Шъузэретыжьы	Фызыретыж	Фызыретыж	He gives y'all to himself
Ady: Ащ Шъо Ащ; Kbd: Абы Фэ Абы	Pst.	Шъузэритыжьыгъ	Фызыритыжащ	Фызыритыжащ	He gave y'all to himself
Ady: Ащ Ар Сэ; Kbd: Абы Ар Сэ	Pres.	Зысетыжьы	Зызетыж	Зызетыж	He gives himself to me
Ady: Ащ Ар Сэ; Kbd: Абы Ар Сэ	Pst.	Зыситыжьыгъ	Зызитыжащ	Зызитыжащ	He gave himself to me
Ady: Ащ Ар Тэ; Kbd: Абы Ар Дэ	Pres.	Зытетыжьы	Зыдетыж	Зыдетыж	He gives himself to us
Ady: Ащ Ар Тэ; Kbd: Абы Ар Дэ	Pst.	Зытитыжьыгъ	Зыдитыжащ	Зыдитыжащ	He gave himself to us
Ady: Ащ Ар О Kbd: Абы Ар Уэ	Pres.	Зыуетыжьы	Зыуетыж	Зыуетыж	He gives himself to you
Ady: Ащ Ар О Kbd: Абы Ар Уэ	Pst.	Зыуитыжьыгъ	Зептыжащ	Зептыжащ	He gave himself to you
Ady: Ащ Ар Шъо; Kbd: Абы Ар Фэ	Pres.	Зышъуетыжьы	Зыветыж	Зыветыж	He gives himself to y'all
Ady: Ащ Ар Шъо; Kbd: Абы Ар Фэ	Pst.	Зышъуитыжьыгъ	Зывитыжащ	Зывитыжащ	He gave himself to y'all
Ady: Ащ Ар Ащ; Kbd: Абы Ар Абы	Pres.	Зызэретыжьы	Зызэретыж	Зызэретыж	He gives himself to himself
Ady: Ащ Ар Ащ; Kbd: Абы Ар Абы	Pst.	Зызэритыжьыгъ	Зызэритыжащ	Зызэритыжащ	He gave himself to himself
Ady: Ащ Ар Ащ; Kbd: Абы Ар Абы	Pres.	Зыретыжьы	Зызыретыж	Зызыретыж	He gives himself to him
Ady: Ащ Ар Ащ; Kbd: Абы Ар Абы	Pst.	Зыритыжьыгъ	Зызыритыжащ	Зызыритыжащ	He gave himself to him
Ady: Ащ Ар Ахэмэ; Kbd: Абы Ар Абыхэм	Pres.	Заретыжьы	Зызыретыж	Зызыретыж	He gives himself to them
Ady: Ащ Ар Ахэмэ; Kbd: Абы Ар Абыхэм	Pst.	Заритыжьыгъ	Зызыритыжащ	Зызыритыжащ	He gave himself to them
Ady: Ащ Ар Ащ; Kbd: Абы Ар Абы	Pres.	Зэретыжьы	Зызыретыж	Зызыретыж	He gives him to himself
Ady: Ащ Ар Ащ; Kbd: Абы Ар Абы	Pst.	Зэритыжьыгъ	Зызыритыжащ	Зызыритыжащ	He gave him to himself
Ady: Ащ Ар Ащ; Kbd: Абы Ар Абы	Pres.	Зыретыжьы	Зызыретыж	Зызыретыж	He gives him to himself
Ady: Ащ Ар Ащ; Kbd: Абы Ар Абы	Pst.	Зыритыжьыгъ	Зызыритыжащ	Зызыритыжащ	He gave him to himself
Ady: Ащ Ахэр Ащ; Kbd: Абы Ахэр Абы	Pres.	Зэретыжьых	Зызыретыжхэ	Зызыретыж	He gives them to himself
Ady: Ащ Ахэр Ащ; Kbd: Абы Ахэр Абы	Pst.	Зэритыжьыгъэх	Зызыритыжахэщ	Зызыритыжащ	He gave them to himself
Ady: Ащ Ахэр Ахэмэ; Kbd: Абы Ахэр Абыхэм	Pres.	Заретыжьых	Зызыретыжхэ	Зызыретыж	He gives them to themselves
Ady: Ащ Ахэр Ахэмэ; Kbd: Абы Ахэр Абыхэм	Pst.	Заритыжьыгъэх	Зызыритыжахэщ	Зызыритыжащ	He gave them to themselves
Subject: 3rd Person Plural (Group A) — Ady Ахэмэ / Kbd Абыхэм
Ady: Ахэмэ Сэ Сэ; Kbd: Абыхэм Сэ Сэ	Pres.	Зысатыжьы	Зызатыж	Зызетыж	They give me to myself
Ady: Ахэмэ Сэ Сэ; Kbd: Абыхэм Сэ Сэ	Pst.	Зысатыжьыгъ	Зызатыжащ	Зызитыжащ	They gave me to myself
Ady: Ахэмэ Сэ Ахэмэ; Kbd: Абыхэм Сэ Абыхэм	Pres.	Сызэратыжьы	Зызыратыж	Зызыретыж	They give me to themselves
Ady: Ахэмэ Сэ Ахэмэ; Kbd: Абыхэм Сэ Абыхэм	Pst.	Сызэратыжьыгъ	Зызыратыжащ	Зызыритыжащ	They gave me to themselves
Ady: Ахэмэ Тэ Тэ; Kbd: Абыхэм Дэ Дэ	Pres.	Зытатыжьы	Зыдатыж	Зыдетыж	They give us to ourselves
Ady: Ахэмэ Тэ Тэ; Kbd: Абыхэм Дэ Дэ	Pst.	Зытатыжьыгъ	Зыдатыжащ	Зыдитыжащ	They gave us to ourselves
Ady: Ахэмэ Тэ Ахэмэ; Kbd: Абыхэм Дэ Абыхэм	Pres.	Тызэратыжьы	Дызыратыж	Дызыретыж	They give us to themselves
Ady: Ахэмэ Тэ Ахэмэ; Kbd: Абыхэм Дэ Абыхэм	Pst.	Тызэратыжьыгъ	Дызыратыжащ	Дызыритыжащ	They gave us to themselves
Ady: Ахэмэ О О Kbd: Абыхэм Уэ Уэ	Pres.	Зыуатыжьы	Зыуатыж	Зыуетыж	They give you to yourself
Ady: Ахэмэ О О Kbd: Абыхэм Уэ Уэ	Pst.	Зыуатыжьыгъ	Зыуатыжащ	Зептыжащ	They gave you to yourself
Ady: Ахэмэ О Ахэмэ; Kbd: Абыхэм Уэ Абыхэм	Pres.	Узэратыжьы	Узыратыж	Узыретыж	They give you to themselves
Ady: Ахэмэ О Ахэмэ; Kbd: Абыхэм Уэ Абыхэм	Pst.	Узэратыжьыгъ	Узыратыжащ	Узыритыжащ	They gave you to themselves
Ady: Ахэмэ Шъо Шъо; Kbd: Абыхэм Фэ Фэ	Pres.	Зышъуатыжьы	Зыватыж	Зыветыж	They give y'all to yourselves
Ady: Ахэмэ Шъо Шъо; Kbd: Абыхэм Фэ Фэ	Pst.	Зышъуатыжьыгъ	Зыватыжащ	Зывитыжащ	They gave y'all to yourselves
Ady: Ахэмэ Шъо Ахэмэ; Kbd: Абыхэм Фэ Абыхэм	Pres.	Шъузэратыжьы	Фызыратыж	Фызыретыж	They give y'all to themselves
Ady: Ахэмэ Шъо Ахэмэ; Kbd: Абыхэм Фэ Абыхэм	Pst.	Шъузэратыжьыгъ	Фызыратыжащ	Фызыритыжащ	They gave y'all to themselves
Ady: Ахэмэ Ахэр Сэ; Kbd: Абыхэм Ахэр Сэ	Pres.	Зысатыжьы	Зызатыж	Зызетыж	They give themselves to me
Ady: Ахэмэ Ахэр Сэ; Kbd: Абыхэм Ахэр Сэ	Pst.	Зысатыжьыгъ	Зызатыжащ	Зызитыжащ	They gave themselves to me
Ady: Ахэмэ Ахэр Тэ; Kbd: Абыхэм Ахэр Дэ	Pres.	Зытатыжьы	Зыдатыж	Зыдетыж	They give themselves to us
Ady: Ахэмэ Ахэр Тэ; Kbd: Абыхэм Ахэр Дэ	Pst.	Зытатыжьыгъ	Зыдатыжащ	Зыдитыжащ	They gave themselves to us
Ady: Ахэмэ Ахэр О Kbd: Абыхэм Ахэр Уэ	Pres.	Зыуатыжьы	Зыуатыж	Зыуетыж	They give themselves to you
Ady: Ахэмэ Ахэр О Kbd: Абыхэм Ахэр Уэ	Pst.	Зыуатыжьыгъ	Зыуатыжащ	Зептыжащ	They gave themselves to you
Ady: Ахэмэ Ахэр Шъо; Kbd: Абыхэм Ахэр Фэ	Pres.	Зышъуатыжьы	Зыватыж	Зыветыж	They give themselves to y'all
Ady: Ахэмэ Ахэр Шъо; Kbd: Абыхэм Ахэр Фэ	Pst.	Зышъуатыжьыгъ	Зыватыжащ	Зывитыжащ	They gave themselves to y'all
Ady: Ахэмэ Ахэр Ахэмэ; Kbd: Абыхэм Ахэр Абыхэм	Pres.	Зызэратыжьы	Зызэратыж	Зызэретыж	They give themselves to themselves
Ady: Ахэмэ Ахэр Ахэмэ; Kbd: Абыхэм Ахэр Абыхэм	Pst.	Зызэратыжьыгъ	Зызэратыжащ	Зызэритыжащ	They gave themselves to themselves
Ady: Ахэмэ Ахэр Ащ; Kbd: Абыхэм Ахэр Абы	Pres.	Зыратыжьы	Зыратыж	Зыретыж	They give themselves to him
Ady: Ахэмэ Ахэр Ащ; Kbd: Абыхэм Ахэр Абы	Pst.	Зыратыжьыгъ	Зыратыжащ	Зыритыжащ	They gave themselves to him
Ady: Ахэмэ Ахэр Ахэмэ; Kbd: Абыхэм Ахэр Абыхэм	Pres.	Заратыжьы	Зыратыж	Зыретыж	They give themselves to them
Ady: Ахэмэ Ахэр Ахэмэ; Kbd: Абыхэм Ахэр Абыхэм	Pst.	Заратыжьыгъ	Зыратыжащ	Зыритыжащ	They gave themselves to them
Ady: Ахэмэ Ар Ахэмэ; Kbd: Абыхэм Ар Абыхэм	Pres.	Зэратыжьы	Зызыратыж	Зызыретыж	They give him to themselves
Ady: Ахэмэ Ар Ахэмэ; Kbd: Абыхэм Ар Абыхэм	Pst.	Зэратыжьыгъ	Зызыратыжащ	Зызыритыжащ	They gave him to themselves
Ady: Ахэмэ Ар Ащ; Kbd: Абыхэм Ар Абы	Pres.	Зыратыжьы	Зыратыж	Зыретыж	They give him to himself
Ady: Ахэмэ Ар Ащ; Kbd: Абыхэм Ар Абы	Pst.	Зыратыжьыгъ	Зыратыжащ	Зыритыжащ	They gave him to himself
Ady: Ахэмэ Ахэр Ахэмэ; Kbd: Абыхэм Ахэр Абыхэм	Pres.	Зэратыжьых	Зызыратыжхэ	Зызыретыж	They give them to themselves
Ady: Ахэмэ Ахэр Ахэмэ; Kbd: Абыхэм Ахэр Абыхэм	Pst.	Зэратыжьыгъэх	Зызыратыжахэщ	Зызыритыжащ	They gave them to themselves
Ady: Ахэмэ Ахэр Ахэмэ; Kbd: Абыхэм Ахэр Абыхэм	Pres.	Заратыжьых	Зыратыжхэ	Зыретыжхэ	They give them to themselves
Ady: Ахэмэ Ахэр Ахэмэ; Kbd: Абыхэм Ахэр Абыхэм	Pst.	Заратыжьыгъэх	Зыратыжахэщ	Зыритыжахэщ	They gave them to themselves

=== Number in modern Kabardian ===
As in the non-reflexive trivalent, modern Kabardian leaves the 3rd-person plural unmarked (agent, theme, recipient alike), using the singular with plurality on the free pronouns (абыхэм / езыхэм). The -хэ / -ра- forms in the Proto-Kabardian column above are the older ones:

Archaic vs. modern Kabardian (reflexive trivalent)
Proto- Kabardian	Plurals	Modern Kabardian	English
Зыратыж	3P ERG → 3S ERG	Зыретыж	A-s give B to B
Зыратыж	3P ERG → 3S ERG; 3P ABS → 3S ABS	Зыретыж	A-s give A-s to B
Зыратыжащ	3P ERG → 3S ERG	Зыритыжащ	A-s gave B to B

=== Adyghe Variants ===
Adyghe — я-series for a 3rd-person-plural recipient. Beside the default а-/-ре-, the Adyghe form takes a я- variant when the recipient (or its coreferent) is 3pl; held out of the main table, base beside variant:

Adyghe я-series (3PL recipient)
config ERG-ABS-OBL	Tense	Adyghe Standard	Adyghe Variants	English
Ady: сэ сэ ахэм Kbd: Сэ сэ абыхэм	Pres.	Засэтыжьы	Зясэтыжьы	I give myself to A-s
Ady: сэ сэ ахэм Kbd: Сэ сэ абыхэм	Pst.	Застыжьыгъ	Зястыжьыгъ	I gave myself to A-s
Ady: сэ ахэр ежьхэм Kbd: Сэ ахэр езыхэм (Сэ A-хэр A-хэм)	Pres.	Засэтыжьых	Зясэтыжьых	I give A-s to A-s
Ady: сэ ахэр ежьхэм Kbd: Сэ ахэр езыхэм (Сэ A-хэр A-хэм)	Pst.	Застыжьыгъэх	Зястыжьыгъэх	I gave A-s to A-s
Ady: о о ахэм Kbd: Уэ уэ абыхэм	Pres.	Заотыжьы	Зяотыжьы	You give yourself to A-s
Ady: о о ахэм Kbd: Уэ уэ абыхэм	Pst.	Заптыжьыгъ	Зяптыжьыгъ	You gave yourself to A-s
Ady: о ахэр ежьхэм Kbd: Уэ ахэр езыхэм (Уэ A-хэр A-хэм)	Pres.	Заотыжьых	Зяотыжьых	You give A-s to A-s
Ady: о ахэр ежьхэм Kbd: Уэ ахэр езыхэм (Уэ A-хэр A-хэм)	Pst.	Заптыжьыгъэх	Зяптыжьыгъэх	You gave A-s to A-s
Ady: ащ ежь адрэхэм Kbd: Абы езыр адрейхэм (A-м A-р B-хэм)	Pres.	Заретыжьы	Зяретыжьы	A gives A to B-s
Ady: ащ ежь адрэхэм Kbd: Абы езыр адрейхэм (A-м A-р B-хэм)	Pst.	Заритыжьыгъ	Зяритыжьыгъ	A gave A to B-s
Ady: ащ адрэхэр ежьхэм Kbd: Абы адрейхэр езыхэм (A-м B-хэр B-хэм)	Pres.	Заретыжьых	Зяретыжьых	A gives B-s to B-s
Ady: ащ адрэхэр ежьхэм Kbd: Абы адрейхэр езыхэм (A-м B-хэр B-хэм)	Pst.	Заритыжьыгъэх	Зяритыжьыгъэх	A gave B-s to B-s
Ady: тэ тэ ахэм Kbd: Дэ дэ абыхэм	Pres.	Затэтыжьы	Зятэтыжьы	We give ourselves to A-s
Ady: тэ тэ ахэм Kbd: Дэ дэ абыхэм	Pst.	Заттыжьыгъ	Зяттыжьыгъ	We gave ourselves to A-s
Ady: тэ ахэр ежьхэм Kbd: Дэ ахэр езыхэм (Дэ A-хэр A-хэм)	Pres.	Затэтыжьых	Зятэтыжьых	We give A-s to A-s
Ady: тэ ахэр ежьхэм Kbd: Дэ ахэр езыхэм (Дэ A-хэр A-хэм)	Pst.	Заттыжьыгъэх	Зяттыжьыгъэх	We gave A-s to A-s
Ady: шъо шъо ахэм Kbd: Фэ фэ абыхэм	Pres.	Зашъотыжьы	Зяшъотыжьы	Y'all give yourselves to A-s
Ady: шъо шъо ахэм Kbd: Фэ фэ абыхэм	Pst.	Зашъутыжьыгъ	Зяшъутыжьыгъ	Y'all gave yourselves to A-s
Ady: шъо ахэр ежьхэм Kbd: Фэ ахэр езыхэм (Фэ A-хэр A-хэм)	Pres.	Зашъотыжьых	Зяшъотыжьых	Y'all give A-s to A-s
Ady: шъо ахэр ежьхэм Kbd: Фэ ахэр езыхэм (Фэ A-хэр A-хэм)	Pst.	Зашъутыжьыгъэх	Зяшъутыжьыгъэх	Y'all gave A-s to A-s
Ady: ахэм ежьхэр адрэхэм Kbd: Абыхэм езыхэр адрейхэм (A-хэм A-хэр B-хэм)	Pres.	Заратыжьы	Зяратыжьы	A-s give A-s to B-s
Ady: ахэм ежьхэр адрэхэм Kbd: Абыхэм езыхэр адрейхэм (A-хэм A-хэр B-хэм)	Pst.	Заратыжьыгъ	Зяратыжьыгъ	A-s gave A-s to B-s
Ady: ахэм адрэхэр ежьхэм Kbd: Абыхэм адрейхэр езыхэм (A-хэм B-хэр B-хэм)	Pres.	Заратыжьых	Зяратыжьых	A-s give B-s to B-s
Ady: ахэм адрэхэр ежьхэм Kbd: Абыхэм адрейхэр езыхэм (A-хэм B-хэр B-хэм)	Pst.	Заратыжьыгъэх	Зяратыжьыгъэх	A-s gave B-s to B-s

== Causative Verb Conjugation ==
A causative verb adds a causer — the participant who makes or lets the action happen — to an ordinary verb. The causer enters as a new ergative agent and the verb takes the prefix гъэ- (just before the root), raising valency by one. The mechanics are identical in both languages; forms differ only in the regular ways (pronouns Шъо/Фэ, Тэ/Дэ, О/Уэ; voicing; the dynamic vowel). Adding the causer reshuffles the other arguments:

How the causer reshapes each base verb
Base verb class	Causer enters as	Old subject becomes	Old object	Result
Monovalent intransitive (subject only)	ERG agent	ABS (causee)	—	transitive
Bivalent intransitive (ABS subject + OBL object)	ERG agent (fills the empty slot)	ABS (causee)	stays OBL	trivalent
Bivalent transitive (ERG subject + ABS object)	ERG agent	OBL (causee, demoted from ERG)	stays ABS	trivalent

Rule of thumb: the causative wraps the ordinary verb with a causer + гъэ- and keeps whatever directional the base verb already had. In slot terms, the causer is a new ERG agent at the front, and гъэ- slots in just before the root (after the dynamic vowel):

Where гъэ- goes — Усэгъэплъэ / Узогъэплъэ "I make you look"
	ABS (causee)	ERG (causer)	DYN	Causative	Root
Adyghe	у- (you)	с- (I)	-э-	гъэ-	плъэ
Kabardian	у- (you)	з- (I)	-о-	гъэ-	плъэ

Each form below appears on two rows — one labelled Ady (Adyghe), one Kbd (Kabardian) — giving the ordinary verb, the added causer, and the resulting causative; the shared English meaning spans both rows. All forms are present tense.

=== Monovalent Intransitive ===
A monovalent intransitive verb has no ergative, so the causer simply becomes the new ergative agent and the old subject stays absolutive (the causee) — the verb turns transitive. E.g. Оплъэ / Уоплъэ "you look" + causer "I" → Усэгъэплъэ / Узогъэплъэ "I make you look".

Causative of monovalent intransitive base — present tense
Lang	Normal verb	New causer	Causative form	English
Causer: 1st Person Singular (Сэ)
Ady	О оплъэ	Сэ	Сэ о усэгъэплъэ	I make you look
Kbd	Уэ уоплъэ	Сэ	Сэ уэ узогъэплъэ	I make you look
Ady	Ар мэплъэ	Сэ	Сэ ар сэгъэплъэ	I make him look
Kbd	Ар маплъэ	Сэ	Сэ ар согъэплъэ	I make him look
Ady	Шъо шъоплъэ	Сэ	Сэ шъо шъусэгъэплъэ	I make y'all look
Kbd	Фэ фоплъэ	Сэ	Сэ фэ фызогъэплъэ	I make y'all look
Ady	Ахэр мэплъэх	Сэ	Сэ ахэр сэгъэплъэх	I make them look
Kbd	Ахэр маплъэ	Сэ	Сэ ахэр согъэплъэ	I make them look
Causer: 2nd Person Singular (О / Уэ)
Ady	Сэ сэплъэ	О	О сэ сыогъэплъэ	you make me look
Kbd	Сэ соплъэ	Уэ	Уэ сэ сыбогъэплъэ	you make me look
Ady	Ар мэплъэ	О	О ар огъэплъэ	you make him look
Kbd	Ар маплъэ	Уэ	Уэ ар уогъэплъэ	you make him look
Ady	Тэ тэплъэ	О	О тэ тыогъэплъэ	you make us look
Kbd	Дэ доплъэ	Уэ	Уэ дэ дыбогъэплъэ	you make us look
Ady	Ахэр мэплъэх	О	О ахэр огъэплъэх	you make them look
Kbd	Ахэр маплъэ	Уэ	Уэ ахэр уогъэплъэ	you make them look
Causer: 3rd Person Singular (Ащ / Абы)
Ady	Сэ сэплъэ	Ащ	Ащ сэ сегъэплъэ	he makes me look
Kbd	Сэ соплъэ	Абы	Абы сэ сегъэплъэ	he makes me look
Ady	О оплъэ	Ащ	Ащ о уегъэплъэ	he makes you look
Kbd	Уэ уоплъэ	Абы	Абы уэ уегъэплъэ	he makes you look
Ady	Ар мэплъэ	Ащ	Ащ ар егъэплъэ	he makes him look
Kbd	Ар маплъэ	Абы	Абы ар егъэплъэ	he makes him look
Ady	Тэ тэплъэ	Ащ	Ащ тэ тегъэплъэ	he makes us look
Kbd	Дэ доплъэ	Абы	Абы дэ дегъэплъэ	he makes us look
Ady	Шъо шъоплъэ	Ащ	Ащ шъо шъуегъэплъэ	he makes y'all look
Kbd	Фэ фоплъэ	Абы	Абы фэ фегъэплъэ	he makes y'all look
Ady	Ахэр мэплъэх	Ащ	Ащ ахэр егъэплъэх	he makes them look
Kbd	Ахэр маплъэ	Абы	Абы ахэр егъэплъэ	he makes them look
Causer: 1st Person Plural (Тэ / Дэ)
Ady	О оплъэ	Тэ	Тэ о утэгъэплъэ	we make you look
Kbd	Уэ уоплъэ	Дэ	Дэ уэ удогъэплъэ	we make you look
Ady	Ар мэплъэ	Тэ	Тэ ар тэгъэплъэ	we make him look
Kbd	Ар маплъэ	Дэ	Дэ ар догъэплъэ	we make him look
Ady	Шъо шъоплъэ	Тэ	Тэ шъо шъутэгъэплъэ	we make y'all look
Kbd	Фэ фоплъэ	Дэ	Дэ фэ фыдогъэплъэ	we make y'all look
Ady	Ахэр мэплъэх	Тэ	Тэ ахэр тэгъэплъэх	we make them look
Kbd	Ахэр маплъэ	Дэ	Дэ ахэр догъэплъэ	we make them look
Causer: 2nd Person Plural (Шъо / Фэ)
Ady	Сэ сэплъэ	Шъо	Шъо сэ сышъогъэплъэ	y'all make me look
Kbd	Сэ соплъэ	Фэ	Фэ сэ сывогъэплъэ	y'all make me look
Ady	Ар мэплъэ	Шъо	Шъо ар шъогъэплъэ	y'all make him look
Kbd	Ар маплъэ	Фэ	Фэ ар фогъэплъэ	y'all make him look
Ady	Тэ тэплъэ	Шъо	Шъо тэ тышъогъэплъэ	y'all make us look
Kbd	Дэ доплъэ	Фэ	Фэ дэ дывогъэплъэ	y'all make us look
Ady	Ахэр мэплъэх	Шъо	Шъо ахэр шъогъэплъэх	y'all make them look
Kbd	Ахэр маплъэ	Фэ	Фэ ахэр фогъэплъэ	y'all make them look
Causer: 3rd Person Plural (Ахэм / Абыхэм)
Ady	Сэ сэплъэ	Ахэм	Ахэм сэ сагъэплъэ	they make me look
Kbd	Сэ соплъэ	Абыхэм	Абыхэм сэ сегъэплъэ	they make me look
Ady	О оплъэ	Ахэм	Ахэм о уагъэплъэ	they make you look
Kbd	Уэ уоплъэ	Абыхэм	Абыхэм уэ уегъэплъэ	they make you look
Ady	Ар мэплъэ	Ахэм	Ахэм ар агъэплъэ	they make him look
Kbd	Ар маплъэ	Абыхэм	Абыхэм ар егъэплъэ	they make him look
Ady	Тэ тэплъэ	Ахэм	Ахэм тэ тагъэплъэ	they make us look
Kbd	Дэ доплъэ	Абыхэм	Абыхэм дэ дегъэплъэ	they make us look
Ady	Шъо шъоплъэ	Ахэм	Ахэм шъо шъуагъэплъэ	they make y'all look
Kbd	Фэ фоплъэ	Абыхэм	Абыхэм фэ фегъэплъэ	they make y'all look
Ady	Ахэр мэплъэх	Ахэм	Ахэм ахэр агъэплъэх	they make them look
Kbd	Ахэр маплъэ	Абыхэм	Абыхэм ахэр егъэплъэ	they make them look

=== Bivalent Intransitive ===
Here the causer fills the empty ergative slot, and (as always) the base verb's directional carries over — an inverse base keeps its къы-. Adding the causer makes the verb trivalent (ERG causer + ABS causee + OBL object), so the "…at them" forms behave exactly like the trivalent я-series (3PL oblique). Because Kabardian collapses the 3SG/3PL oblique object, its "…at him" and "…at them" causatives coincide; Adyghe keeps them distinct, marking the 3PL oblique with я- — which surfaces as the а- that merges with the causee prefix and the 3rd-person linker (e.g. "…at him" срегъэплъы → "…at them" сарегъэплъы; есэгъэплъы → асэгъэплъы).

Causative of bivalent intransitive base — present tense
Lang	Normal verb	New causer	Causative form	English
Causer: 1st Person Singular (Сэ)
Ady	О ащ уеплъы	Сэ	Сэ о ащ уесэгъэплъы	I make you look at him
Kbd	Уэ абы уоплъ	Сэ	Сэ уэ абы узогъэплъы	I make you look at him
Ady	О ахэм уаплъы	Сэ	Сэ о ахэм уасэгъэплъы	I make you look at them
Kbd	Уэ абыхэм уоплъ	Сэ	Сэ уэ абыхэм узогъэплъы	I make you look at them
Ady	Шъо ащ шъуеплъы	Сэ	Сэ шъо ащ шъуесэгъэплъы	I make y'all look at him
Kbd	Фэ абы фоплъ	Сэ	Сэ фэ абы фызогъэплъы	I make y'all look at him
Ady	Шъо ахэм шъуаплъы	Сэ	Сэ шъо ахэм шъуасэгъэплъы	I make y'all look at them
Kbd	Фэ абыхэм фоплъ	Сэ	Сэ фэ абыхэм фызогъэплъы	I make y'all look at them
Ady	Ар о къыоплъы	Сэ	Сэ ар о къыосэгъэплъы	I make him look at you
Kbd	Ар уэ къоплъ	Сэ	Сэ ар уэ укъызогъэплъы	I make him look at you
Ady	Ар шъо къышъоплъы	Сэ	Сэ ар шъо къышъосэгъэплъы	I make him look at y'all
Kbd	Ар фэ къывоплъ	Сэ	Сэ ар фэ фыкъызогъэплъы	I make him look at y'all
Ady	Ар ащ еплъы	Сэ	Сэ ар ащ есэгъэплъы	I make him look at him
Kbd	Ар абы йоплъ	Сэ	Сэ ар абы изогъэплъы	I make him look at him
Ady	Ар ахэм аплъы	Сэ	Сэ ар ахэм асэгъэплъы	I make him look at them
Kbd	Ар абыхэм йоплъ	Сэ	Сэ ар абыхэм изогъэплъы	I make him look at them
Ady	Ахэр о къыоплъых	Сэ	Сэ ахэр о къыосэгъэплъых	I make them look at you
Kbd	Ахэр уэ къоплъ	Сэ	Сэ ахэр уэ укъызогъэплъы	I make them look at you
Ady	Ахэр шъо къышъоплъых	Сэ	Сэ ахэр шъо къышъосэгъэплъых	I make them look at y'all
Kbd	Ахэр фэ къывоплъ	Сэ	Сэ ахэр фэ фыкъызогъэплъы	I make them look at y'all
Ady	Ахэр ащ еплъых	Сэ	Сэ ахэр ащ есэгъэплъых	I make them look at him
Kbd	Ахэр абы йоплъ	Сэ	Сэ ахэр абы изогъэплъы	I make them look at him
Ady	Ахэр ахэм аплъых	Сэ	Сэ ахэр ахэм асэгъэплъых	I make them look at them
Kbd	Ахэр абыхэм йоплъ	Сэ	Сэ ахэр абыхэм изогъэплъы	I make them look at them
Causer: 2nd Person Singular (О / Уэ)
Ady	Сэ ащ сеплъы	О	О сэ ащ сеогъэплъы	you make me look at him
Kbd	Сэ абы соплъ	Уэ	Уэ сэ абы сыбогъэплъы	you make me look at him
Ady	Сэ ахэм саплъы	О	О сэ ахэм саогъэплъы	you make me look at them
Kbd	Сэ абыхэм соплъ	Уэ	Уэ сэ абыхэм сыбогъэплъы	you make me look at them
Ady	Тэ ащ теплъы	О	О тэ ащ теогъэплъы	you make us look at him
Kbd	Дэ абы доплъ	Уэ	Уэ дэ абы дыбогъэплъы	you make us look at him
Ady	Тэ ахэм таплъы	О	О тэ ахэм таогъэплъы	you make us look at them
Kbd	Дэ абыхэм доплъ	Уэ	Уэ дэ абыхэм дыбогъэплъы	you make us look at them
Ady	Ар сэ къысэплъы	О	О ар сэ къысэогъэплъы	you make him look at me
Kbd	Ар сэ къызоплъ	Уэ	Уэ ар сэ къызыбогъэплъы	you make him look at me
Ady	Ар тэ къытэплъы	О	О ар тэ къытэогъэплъы	you make him look at us
Kbd	Ар дэ къыдоплъ	Уэ	Уэ ар дэ къыдыбогъэплъы	you make him look at us
Ady	Ар ащ еплъы	О	О ар ащ еогъэплъы	you make him look at him
Kbd	Ар абы йоплъ	Уэ	Уэ ар абы ибогъэплъы	you make him look at him
Ady	Ар ахэм аплъы	О	О ар ахэм аогъэплъы	you make him look at them
Kbd	Ар абыхэм йоплъ	Уэ	Уэ ар абыхэм ибогъэплъы	you make him look at them
Ady	Ахэр сэ къысэплъых	О	О ахэр сэ къысэогъэплъых	you make them look at me
Kbd	Ахэр сэ къызоплъ	Уэ	Уэ ахэр сэ къызыбогъэплъы	you make them look at me
Ady	Ахэр тэ къытэплъых	О	О ахэр тэ къытэогъэплъых	you make them look at us
Kbd	Ахэр дэ къыдоплъ	Уэ	Уэ ахэр дэ къыдыбогъэплъы	you make them look at us
Ady	Ахэр ащ еплъых	О	О ахэр ащ еогъэплъых	you make them look at him
Kbd	Ахэр абы йоплъ	Уэ	Уэ ахэр абы ибогъэплъы	you make them look at him
Ady	Ахэр ахэм аплъых	О	О ахэр ахэм аогъэплъых	you make them look at them
Kbd	Ахэр абыхэм йоплъ	Уэ	Уэ ахэр абыхэм ибогъэплъы	you make them look at them
Causer: 3rd Person Singular (Ащ / Абы)
Ady	Сэ о сыоплъы	Ащ	Ащ сэ о сыуегъэплъы	he makes me look at you
Kbd	Сэ уэ сыноплъ	Абы	Абы сэ уэ сыкъыуегъэплъы	he makes me look at you
Ady	Сэ шъо сышъоплъы	Ащ	Ащ сэ шъо сышъуегъэплъы	he makes me look at y'all
Kbd	Сэ фэ сынывоплъ	Абы	Абы сэ фэ сыкъывегъэплъы	he makes me look at y'all
Ady	Тэ о тыоплъы	Ащ	Ащ тэ о тыуегъэплъы	he makes us look at you
Kbd	Дэ уэ дыноплъ	Абы	Абы дэ уэ дыкъыуегъэплъы	he makes us look at you
Ady	Тэ шъо тышъоплъы	Ащ	Ащ тэ шъо тышъуегъэплъы	he makes us look at y'all
Kbd	Дэ фэ дынывоплъ	Абы	Абы дэ фэ дыкъывегъэплъы	he makes us look at y'all
Ady	Сэ ащ сеплъы	Ащ	Ащ сэ ащ срегъэплъы	he makes me look at him
Kbd	Сэ абы соплъ	Абы	Абы сэ абы срегъэплъы	he makes me look at him
Ady	Сэ ахэм саплъы	Ащ	Ащ сэ ахэм сарегъэплъы	he makes me look at them
Kbd	Сэ абыхэм соплъ	Абы	Абы сэ абыхэм срегъэплъы	he makes me look at them
Ady	Тэ ащ теплъы	Ащ	Ащ тэ ащ трегъэплъы	he makes us look at him
Kbd	Дэ абы доплъ	Абы	Абы дэ абы дрегъэплъы	he makes us look at him
Ady	Тэ ахэм таплъы	Ащ	Ащ тэ ахэм тарегъэплъы	he makes us look at them
Kbd	Дэ абыхэм доплъ	Абы	Абы дэ абыхэм дрегъэплъы	he makes us look at them
Ady	О сэ укъысэплъы	Ащ	Ащ о сэ укъысегъэплъы	he makes you look at me
Kbd	Уэ сэ укъызоплъ	Абы	Абы уэ сэ укъызегъэплъы	he makes you look at me
Ady	О тэ укъытэплъы	Ащ	Ащ о тэ укъытегъэплъы	he makes you look at us
Kbd	Уэ дэ укъыдоплъ	Абы	Абы уэ дэ укъыдегъэплъы	he makes you look at us
Ady	Шъо сэ шъукъысэплъы	Ащ	Ащ шъо сэ шъукъысегъэплъы	he makes y'all look at me
Kbd	Фэ сэ фыкъызоплъ	Абы	Абы фэ сэ фыкъызегъэплъы	he makes y'all look at me
Ady	Шъо тэ шъукъытэплъы	Ащ	Ащ шъо тэ шъукъытегъэплъы	he makes y'all look at us
Kbd	Фэ дэ фыкъыдоплъ	Абы	Абы фэ дэ фыкъыдегъэплъы	he makes y'all look at us
Ady	О ащ уеплъы	Ащ	Ащ о ащ урегъэплъы	he makes you look at him
Kbd	Уэ абы уоплъ	Абы	Абы уэ абы урегъэплъы	he makes you look at him
Ady	О ахэм уаплъы	Ащ	Ащ о ахэм уарегъэплъы	he makes you look at them
Kbd	Уэ абыхэм уоплъ	Абы	Абы уэ абыхэм урегъэплъы	he makes you look at them
Ady	Шъо ащ шъуеплъы	Ащ	Ащ шъо ащ шъурегъэплъы	he makes y'all look at him
Kbd	Фэ абы фоплъ	Абы	Абы фэ абы фрегъэплъы	he makes y'all look at him
Ady	Шъо ахэм шъуаплъы	Ащ	Ащ шъо ахэм шъуарегъэплъы	he makes y'all look at them
Kbd	Фэ абыхэм фоплъ	Абы	Абы фэ абыхэм фрегъэплъы	he makes y'all look at them
Ady	Ар сэ къысэплъы	Ащ	Ащ ар сэ къысегъэплъы	he makes him look at me
Kbd	Ар сэ къызоплъ	Абы	Абы ар сэ къызегъэплъы	he makes him look at me
Ady	Ар тэ къытэплъы	Ащ	Ащ ар тэ къытегъэплъы	he makes him look at us
Kbd	Ар дэ къыдоплъ	Абы	Абы ар дэ къыдегъэплъы	he makes him look at us
Ady	Ар о къыоплъы	Ащ	Ащ ар о къыуегъэплъы	he makes him look at you
Kbd	Ар уэ къоплъ	Абы	Абы ар уэ къыуегъэплъы	he makes him look at you
Ady	Ар шъо къышъоплъы	Ащ	Ащ ар шъо къышъуегъэплъы	he makes him look at y'all
Kbd	Ар фэ къывоплъ	Абы	Абы ар фэ къывегъэплъы	he makes him look at y'all
Ady	Ар ащ еплъы	Ащ	Ащ ар ащ регъэплъы	he makes him look at him
Kbd	Ар абы йоплъ	Абы	Абы ар абы ирегъэплъы	he makes him look at him
Ady	Ар ахэм аплъы	Ащ	Ащ ар ахэм арегъэплъы	he makes him look at them
Kbd	Ар абыхэм йоплъ	Абы	Абы ар абыхэм ирегъэплъы	he makes him look at them
Ady	Ахэр сэ къысэплъых	Ащ	Ащ ахэр сэ къысегъэплъых	he makes them look at me
Kbd	Ахэр сэ къызоплъ	Абы	Абы ахэр сэ къызегъэплъы	he makes them look at me
Ady	Ахэр тэ къытэплъых	Ащ	Ащ ахэр тэ къытегъэплъых	he makes them look at us
Kbd	Ахэр дэ къыдоплъ	Абы	Абы ахэр дэ къыдегъэплъы	he makes them look at us
Ady	Ахэр о къыоплъых	Ащ	Ащ ахэр о къыуегъэплъых	he makes them look at you
Kbd	Ахэр уэ къоплъ	Абы	Абы ахэр уэ къыуегъэплъы	he makes them look at you
Ady	Ахэр шъо къышъоплъых	Ащ	Ащ ахэр шъо къышъуегъэплъых	he makes them look at y'all
Kbd	Ахэр фэ къывоплъ	Абы	Абы ахэр фэ къывегъэплъы	he makes them look at y'all
Ady	Ахэр ащ еплъых	Ащ	Ащ ахэр ащ регъэплъых	he makes them look at him
Kbd	Ахэр абы йоплъ	Абы	Абы ахэр абы ирегъэплъы	he makes them look at him
Ady	Ахэр ахэм аплъых	Ащ	Ащ ахэр ахэм арегъэплъых	he makes them look at them
Kbd	Ахэр абыхэм йоплъ	Абы	Абы ахэр абыхэм ирегъэплъы	he makes them look at them
Causer: 1st Person Plural (Тэ / Дэ)
Ady	О ащ уеплъы	Тэ	Тэ о ащ уетэгъэплъы	we make you look at him
Kbd	Уэ абы уоплъ	Дэ	Дэ уэ абы удогъэплъы	we make you look at him
Ady	О ахэм уаплъы	Тэ	Тэ о ахэм уатэгъэплъы	we make you look at them
Kbd	Уэ абыхэм уоплъ	Дэ	Дэ уэ абыхэм удогъэплъы	we make you look at them
Ady	Шъо ащ шъуеплъы	Тэ	Тэ шъо ащ шъуетэгъэплъы	we make y'all look at him
Kbd	Фэ абы фоплъ	Дэ	Дэ фэ абы фыдогъэплъы	we make y'all look at him
Ady	Шъо ахэм шъуаплъы	Тэ	Тэ шъо ахэм шъуатэгъэплъы	we make y'all look at them
Kbd	Фэ абыхэм фоплъ	Дэ	Дэ фэ абыхэм фыдогъэплъы	we make y'all look at them
Ady	Ар о къыоплъы	Тэ	Тэ ар о къыотэгъэплъы	we make him look at you
Kbd	Ар уэ къоплъ	Дэ	Дэ ар уэ укъыдогъэплъы	we make him look at you
Ady	Ар шъо къышъоплъы	Тэ	Тэ ар шъо къышъотэгъэплъы	we make him look at y'all
Kbd	Ар фэ къывоплъ	Дэ	Дэ ар фэ фыкъыдогъэплъы	we make him look at y'all
Ady	Ар ащ еплъы	Тэ	Тэ ар ащ етэгъэплъы	we make him look at him
Kbd	Ар абы йоплъ	Дэ	Дэ ар абы идогъэплъы	we make him look at him
Ady	Ар ахэм аплъы	Тэ	Тэ ар ахэм атэгъэплъы	we make him look at them
Kbd	Ар абыхэм йоплъ	Дэ	Дэ ар абыхэм идогъэплъы	we make him look at them
Ady	Ахэр о къыоплъых	Тэ	Тэ ахэр о къыотэгъэплъых	we make them look at you
Kbd	Ахэр уэ къоплъ	Дэ	Дэ ахэр уэ укъыдогъэплъы	we make them look at you
Ady	Ахэр шъо къышъоплъых	Тэ	Тэ ахэр шъо къышъотэгъэплъых	we make them look at y'all
Kbd	Ахэр фэ къывоплъ	Дэ	Дэ ахэр фэ фыкъыдогъэплъы	we make them look at y'all
Ady	Ахэр ащ еплъых	Тэ	Тэ ахэр ащ етэгъэплъых	we make them look at him
Kbd	Ахэр абы йоплъ	Дэ	Дэ ахэр абы идогъэплъы	we make them look at him
Ady	Ахэр ахэм аплъых	Тэ	Тэ ахэр ахэм атэгъэплъых	we make them look at them
Kbd	Ахэр абыхэм йоплъ	Дэ	Дэ ахэр абыхэм идогъэплъы	we make them look at them
Causer: 2nd Person Plural (Шъо / Фэ)
Ady	Сэ ащ сеплъы	Шъо	Шъо сэ ащ сешъогъэплъы	y'all make me look at him
Kbd	Сэ абы соплъ	Фэ	Фэ сэ абы сывогъэплъы	y'all make me look at him
Ady	Сэ ахэм саплъы	Шъо	Шъо сэ ахэм сашъогъэплъы	y'all make me look at them
Kbd	Сэ абыхэм соплъ	Фэ	Фэ сэ абыхэм сывогъэплъы	y'all make me look at them
Ady	Тэ ащ теплъы	Шъо	Шъо тэ ащ тешъогъэплъы	y'all make us look at him
Kbd	Дэ абы доплъ	Фэ	Фэ дэ абы дывогъэплъы	y'all make us look at him
Ady	Тэ ахэм таплъы	Шъо	Шъо тэ ахэм ташъогъэплъы	y'all make us look at them
Kbd	Дэ абыхэм доплъ	Фэ	Фэ дэ абыхэм дывогъэплъы	y'all make us look at them
Ady	Ар сэ къысэплъы	Шъо	Шъо ар сэ къысэшъогъэплъы	y'all make him look at me
Kbd	Ар сэ къызоплъ	Фэ	Фэ ар сэ къызывогъэплъы	y'all make him look at me
Ady	Ар тэ къытэплъы	Шъо	Шъо ар тэ къытэшъогъэплъы	y'all make him look at us
Kbd	Ар дэ къыдоплъ	Фэ	Фэ ар дэ къыдывогъэплъы	y'all make him look at us
Ady	Ар ащ еплъы	Шъо	Шъо ар ащ ешъогъэплъы	y'all make him look at him
Kbd	Ар абы йоплъ	Фэ	Фэ ар абы ивогъэплъы	y'all make him look at him
Ady	Ар ахэм аплъы	Шъо	Шъо ар ахэм ашъогъэплъы	y'all make him look at them
Kbd	Ар абыхэм йоплъ	Фэ	Фэ ар абыхэм ивогъэплъы	y'all make him look at them
Ady	Ахэр сэ къысэплъых	Шъо	Шъо ахэр сэ къысэшъогъэплъых	y'all make them look at me
Kbd	Ахэр сэ къызоплъ	Фэ	Фэ ахэр сэ къызывогъэплъы	y'all make them look at me
Ady	Ахэр тэ къытэплъых	Шъо	Шъо ахэр тэ къытэшъогъэплъых	y'all make them look at us
Kbd	Ахэр дэ къыдоплъ	Фэ	Фэ ахэр дэ къыдывогъэплъы	y'all make them look at us
Ady	Ахэр ащ еплъых	Шъо	Шъо ахэр ащ ешъогъэплъых	y'all make them look at him
Kbd	Ахэр абы йоплъ	Фэ	Фэ ахэр абы ивогъэплъы	y'all make them look at him
Ady	Ахэр ахэм аплъых	Шъо	Шъо ахэр ахэм ашъогъэплъых	y'all make them look at them
Kbd	Ахэр абыхэм йоплъ	Фэ	Фэ ахэр абыхэм ивогъэплъы	y'all make them look at them
Causer: 3rd Person Plural (Ахэм / Абыхэм)
Ady	Сэ о сыоплъы	Ахэм	Ахэм сэ о сыуагъэплъы	they make me look at you
Kbd	Сэ уэ сыноплъ	Абыхэм	Абыхэм сэ уэ сыкъыуегъэплъы	they make me look at you
Ady	Сэ шъо сышъоплъы	Ахэм	Ахэм сэ шъо сышъуагъэплъы	they make me look at y'all
Kbd	Сэ фэ сынывоплъ	Абыхэм	Абыхэм сэ фэ сыкъывегъэплъы	they make me look at y'all
Ady	Тэ о тыоплъы	Ахэм	Ахэм тэ о тыуагъэплъы	they make us look at you
Kbd	Дэ уэ дыноплъ	Абыхэм	Абыхэм дэ уэ дыкъыуегъэплъы	they make us look at you
Ady	Тэ шъо тышъоплъы	Ахэм	Ахэм тэ шъо тышъуагъэплъы	they make us look at y'all
Kbd	Дэ фэ дынывоплъ	Абыхэм	Абыхэм дэ фэ дыкъывегъэплъы	they make us look at y'all
Ady	Сэ ащ сеплъы	Ахэм	Ахэм сэ ащ срагъэплъы	they make me look at him
Kbd	Сэ абы соплъ	Абыхэм	Абыхэм сэ абы срегъэплъы	they make me look at him
Ady	Сэ ахэм саплъы	Ахэм	Ахэм сэ ахэм сарагъэплъы	they make me look at them
Kbd	Сэ абыхэм соплъ	Абыхэм	Абыхэм сэ абыхэм срегъэплъы	they make me look at them
Ady	Тэ ащ теплъы	Ахэм	Ахэм тэ ащ трагъэплъы	they make us look at him
Kbd	Дэ абы доплъ	Абыхэм	Абыхэм дэ абы дрегъэплъы	they make us look at him
Ady	Тэ ахэм таплъы	Ахэм	Ахэм тэ ахэм тарагъэплъы	they make us look at them
Kbd	Дэ абыхэм доплъ	Абыхэм	Абыхэм дэ абыхэм дрегъэплъы	they make us look at them
Ady	О сэ укъысэплъы	Ахэм	Ахэм о сэ укъысагъэплъы	they make you look at me
Kbd	Уэ сэ укъызоплъ	Абыхэм	Абыхэм уэ сэ укъызегъэплъы	they make you look at me
Ady	О тэ укъытэплъы	Ахэм	Ахэм о тэ укъытагъэплъы	they make you look at us
Kbd	Уэ дэ укъыдоплъ	Абыхэм	Абыхэм уэ дэ укъыдегъэплъы	they make you look at us
Ady	Шъо сэ шъукъысэплъы	Ахэм	Ахэм шъо сэ шъукъысагъэплъы	they make y'all look at me
Kbd	Фэ сэ фыкъызоплъ	Абыхэм	Абыхэм фэ сэ фыкъызегъэплъы	they make y'all look at me
Ady	Шъо тэ шъукъытэплъы	Ахэм	Ахэм шъо тэ шъукъытагъэплъы	they make y'all look at us
Kbd	Фэ дэ фыкъыдоплъ	Абыхэм	Абыхэм фэ дэ фыкъыдегъэплъы	they make y'all look at us
Ady	О ащ уеплъы	Ахэм	Ахэм о ащ урагъэплъы	they make you look at him
Kbd	Уэ абы уоплъ	Абыхэм	Абыхэм уэ абы урегъэплъы	they make you look at him
Ady	О ахэм уаплъы	Ахэм	Ахэм о ахэм уарагъэплъы	they make you look at them
Kbd	Уэ абыхэм уоплъ	Абыхэм	Абыхэм уэ абыхэм урегъэплъы	they make you look at them
Ady	Шъо ащ шъуеплъы	Ахэм	Ахэм шъо ащ шъурагъэплъы	they make y'all look at him
Kbd	Фэ абы фоплъ	Абыхэм	Абыхэм фэ абы фрегъэплъы	they make y'all look at him
Ady	Шъо ахэм шъуаплъы	Ахэм	Ахэм шъо ахэм шъуарагъэплъы	they make y'all look at them
Kbd	Фэ абыхэм фоплъ	Абыхэм	Абыхэм фэ абыхэм фрегъэплъы	they make y'all look at them
Ady	Ар сэ къысэплъы	Ахэм	Ахэм ар сэ къысагъэплъы	they make him look at me
Kbd	Ар сэ къызоплъ	Абыхэм	Абыхэм ар сэ къызегъэплъы	they make him look at me
Ady	Ар тэ къытэплъы	Ахэм	Ахэм ар тэ къытагъэплъы	they make him look at us
Kbd	Ар дэ къыдоплъ	Абыхэм	Абыхэм ар дэ къыдегъэплъы	they make him look at us
Ady	Ар о къыоплъы	Ахэм	Ахэм ар о къыуагъэплъы	they make him look at you
Kbd	Ар уэ къоплъ	Абыхэм	Абыхэм ар уэ къыуегъэплъы	they make him look at you
Ady	Ар шъо къышъоплъы	Ахэм	Ахэм ар шъо къышъуагъэплъы	they make him look at y'all
Kbd	Ар фэ къывоплъ	Абыхэм	Абыхэм ар фэ къывегъэплъы	they make him look at y'all
Ady	Ар ащ еплъы	Ахэм	Ахэм ар ащ рагъэплъы	they make him look at him
Kbd	Ар абы йоплъ	Абыхэм	Абыхэм ар абы ирегъэплъы	they make him look at him
Ady	Ар ахэм аплъы	Ахэм	Ахэм ар ахэм арагъэплъы	they make him look at them
Kbd	Ар абыхэм йоплъ	Абыхэм	Абыхэм ар абыхэм ирегъэплъы	they make him look at them
Ady	Ахэр сэ къысэплъых	Ахэм	Ахэм ахэр сэ къысагъэплъых	they make them look at me
Kbd	Ахэр сэ къызоплъ	Абыхэм	Абыхэм ахэр сэ къызегъэплъы	they make them look at me
Ady	Ахэр тэ къытэплъых	Ахэм	Ахэм ахэр тэ къытагъэплъых	they make them look at us
Kbd	Ахэр дэ къыдоплъ	Абыхэм	Абыхэм ахэр дэ къыдегъэплъы	they make them look at us
Ady	Ахэр о къыоплъых	Ахэм	Ахэм ахэр о къыуагъэплъых	they make them look at you
Kbd	Ахэр уэ къоплъ	Абыхэм	Абыхэм ахэр уэ къыуегъэплъы	they make them look at you
Ady	Ахэр шъо къышъоплъых	Ахэм	Ахэм ахэр шъо къышъуагъэплъых	they make them look at y'all
Kbd	Ахэр фэ къывоплъ	Абыхэм	Абыхэм ахэр фэ къывегъэплъы	they make them look at y'all
Ady	Ахэр ащ еплъых	Ахэм	Ахэм ахэр ащ рагъэплъых	they make them look at him
Kbd	Ахэр абы йоплъ	Абыхэм	Абыхэм ахэр абы ирегъэплъы	they make them look at him
Ady	Ахэр ахэм аплъых	Ахэм	Ахэм ахэр ахэм арагъэплъых	they make them look at them
Kbd	Ахэр абыхэм йоплъ	Абыхэм	Абыхэм ахэр абыхэм ирегъэплъы	they make them look at them

=== Bivalent Transitive ===
A bivalent transitive verb has an ergative subject and an absolutive object but no oblique. The causer takes the ergative slot and the old subject is demoted from ergative to oblique (the causee); the old object stays absolutive — the result is trivalent.

Causative of bivalent transitive base — present tense
Lang	Normal verb	New causer	Causative form	English
Causer: 1st Person Singular (Сэ)
Ady	Ащ о уелъэгъу	Сэ	Сэ о ащ уесэгъэлъэгъу	I make him see you
Kbd	Абы уэ уелъагъу	Сэ	Сэ уэ абы узогъэлъагъу	I make him see you
Ady	Ахэм о уалъэгъу	Сэ	Сэ о ахэм уасэгъэлъэгъу	I make them see you
Kbd	Абыхэм уэ уелъагъу	Сэ	Сэ уэ абыхэм узогъэлъагъу	I make them see you
Ady	Ащ шъо шъуелъэгъу	Сэ	Сэ шъо ащ шъуесэгъэлъэгъу	I make him see y'all
Kbd	Абы фэ фелъагъу	Сэ	Сэ фэ абы фызогъэлъагъу	I make him see y'all
Ady	Ахэм шъо шъуалъэгъу	Сэ	Сэ шъо ахэм шъуасэгъэлъэгъу	I make them see y'all
Kbd	Абыхэм фэ фелъагъу	Сэ	Сэ фэ абыхэм фызогъэлъагъу	I make them see y'all
Ady	О ар олъэгъу	Сэ	Сэ ар о осэгъэлъэгъу	I make you see him
Kbd	Уэ ар уолъагъу	Сэ	Сэ ар уэ узогъэлъагъу	I make you see him
Ady	Шъо ар шъолъэгъу	Сэ	Сэ ар шъо шъосэгъэлъэгъу	I make y'all see him
Kbd	Фэ ар фолъагъу	Сэ	Сэ ар фэ фызогъэлъагъу	I make y'all see him
Ady	Ащ ар елъэгъу	Сэ	Сэ ар ащ есэгъэлъэгъу	I make him see him
Kbd	Абы ар елъагъу	Сэ	Сэ ар абы изогъэлъагъу	I make him see him
Ady	Ахэм ар алъэгъу	Сэ	Сэ ар ахэм асэгъэлъэгъу	I make them see him
Kbd	Абыхэм ар елъагъу	Сэ	Сэ ар абыхэм изогъэлъагъу	I make them see him
Ady	О ахэр олъэгъух	Сэ	Сэ ахэр о осэгъэлъэгъух	I make you see them
Kbd	Уэ ахэр уолъагъу	Сэ	Сэ ахэр уэ узогъэлъагъу	I make you see them
Ady	Шъо ахэр шъолъэгъух	Сэ	Сэ ахэр шъо шъосэгъэлъэгъух	I make y'all see them
Kbd	Фэ ахэр фолъагъу	Сэ	Сэ ахэр фэ фызогъэлъагъу	I make y'all see them
Ady	Ащ ахэр елъэгъух	Сэ	Сэ ахэр ащ есэгъэлъэгъух	I make him see them
Kbd	Абы ахэр елъагъу	Сэ	Сэ ахэр абы изогъэлъагъу	I make him see them
Ady	Ахэм ахэр алъэгъух	Сэ	Сэ ахэр ахэм асэгъэлъэгъух	I make them see them
Kbd	Абыхэм ахэр елъагъу	Сэ	Сэ ахэр абыхэм изогъэлъагъу	I make them see them
Causer: 2nd Person Singular (О / Уэ)
Ady	Ащ сэ селъэгъу	О	О сэ ащ сеогъэлъэгъу	you make him see me
Kbd	Абы сэ селъагъу	Уэ	Уэ сэ абы сыбогъэлъагъу	you make him see me
Ady	Ахэм сэ салъэгъу	О	О сэ ахэм саогъэлъэгъу	you make them see me
Kbd	Абыхэм сэ селъагъу	Уэ	Уэ сэ абыхэм сыбогъэлъагъу	you make them see me
Ady	Ащ тэ телъэгъу	О	О тэ ащ теогъэлъэгъу	you make him see us
Kbd	Абы дэ делъагъу	Уэ	Уэ дэ абы дыбогъэлъагъу	you make him see us
Ady	Ахэм тэ талъэгъу	О	О тэ ахэм таогъэлъэгъу	you make them see us
Kbd	Абыхэм дэ делъагъу	Уэ	Уэ дэ абыхэм дыбогъэлъагъу	you make them see us
Ady	Сэ ар сэлъэгъу	О	О ар сэ сэогъэлъэгъу	you make me see him
Kbd	Сэ ар солъагъу	Уэ	Уэ ар сэ зыбогъэлъагъу	you make me see him
Ady	Тэ ар тэлъэгъу	О	О ар тэ тэогъэлъэгъу	you make us see him
Kbd	Дэ ар долъагъу	Уэ	Уэ ар дэ дыбогъэлъагъу	you make us see him
Ady	Ащ ар елъэгъу	О	О ар ащ еогъэлъэгъу	you make him see him
Kbd	Абы ар елъагъу	Уэ	Уэ ар абы ибогъэлъагъу	you make him see him
Ady	Ахэм ар алъэгъу	О	О ар ахэм аогъэлъэгъу	you make them see him
Kbd	Абыхэм ар елъагъу	Уэ	Уэ ар абыхэм ибогъэлъагъу	you make them see him
Ady	Сэ ахэр сэлъэгъух	О	О ахэр сэ сэогъэлъэгъух	you make me see them
Kbd	Сэ ахэр солъагъу	Уэ	Уэ ахэр сэ зыбогъэлъагъу	you make me see them
Ady	Тэ ахэр тэлъэгъух	О	О ахэр тэ тэогъэлъэгъух	you make us see them
Kbd	Дэ ахэр долъагъу	Уэ	Уэ ахэр дэ дыбогъэлъагъу	you make us see them
Ady	Ащ ахэр елъэгъух	О	О ахэр ащ еогъэлъэгъух	you make him see them
Kbd	Абы ахэр елъагъу	Уэ	Уэ ахэр абы ибогъэлъагъу	you make him see them
Ady	Ахэм ахэр алъэгъух	О	О ахэр ахэм аогъэлъэгъух	you make them see them
Kbd	Абыхэм ахэр елъагъу	Уэ	Уэ ахэр абыхэм ибогъэлъагъу	you make them see them
Causer: 3rd Person Singular (Ащ / Абы)
Ady	О сэ сыолъэгъу	Ащ	Ащ сэ о сыуегъэлъэгъу	he makes you see me
Kbd	Уэ сэ сыболъагъу	Абы	Абы сэ уэ сыуегъэлъагъу	he makes you see me
Ady	Шъо сэ сышъолъэгъу	Ащ	Ащ сэ шъо сышъуегъэлъэгъу	he makes y'all see me
Kbd	Фэ сэ сыволъагъу	Абы	Абы сэ фэ сывегъэлъагъу	he makes y'all see me
Ady	О тэ тыолъэгъу	Ащ	Ащ тэ о тыуегъэлъэгъу	he makes you see us
Kbd	Уэ дэ дыболъагъу	Абы	Абы дэ уэ дыуегъэлъагъу	he makes you see us
Ady	Шъо тэ тышъолъэгъу	Ащ	Ащ тэ шъо тышъуегъэлъэгъу	he makes y'all see us
Kbd	Фэ дэ дыволъагъу	Абы	Абы дэ фэ дывегъэлъагъу	he makes y'all see us
Ady	Ащ сэ селъэгъу	Ащ	Ащ сэ ащ срегъэлъэгъу	he makes him see me
Kbd	Абы сэ селъагъу	Абы	Абы сэ абы срегъэлъагъу	he makes him see me
Ady	Ахэм сэ салъэгъу	Ащ	Ащ сэ ахэм сарегъэлъэгъу	he makes them see me
Kbd	Абыхэм сэ селъагъу	Абы	Абы сэ абыхэм срегъэлъагъу	he makes them see me
Ady	Ащ тэ телъэгъу	Ащ	Ащ тэ ащ трегъэлъэгъу	he makes him see us
Kbd	Абы дэ делъагъу	Абы	Абы дэ абы дрегъэлъагъу	he makes him see us
Ady	Ахэм тэ талъэгъу	Ащ	Ащ тэ ахэм тарегъэлъэгъу	he makes them see us
Kbd	Абыхэм дэ делъагъу	Абы	Абы дэ абыхэм дрегъэлъагъу	he makes them see us
Ady	Сэ о усэлъэгъу	Ащ	Ащ о сэ усегъэлъэгъу	he makes me see you
Kbd	Сэ уэ узолъагъу	Абы	Абы уэ сэ узегъэлъагъу	he makes me see you
Ady	Тэ о утэлъэгъу	Ащ	Ащ о тэ утегъэлъэгъу	he makes us see you
Kbd	Дэ уэ удолъагъу	Абы	Абы уэ дэ удегъэлъагъу	he makes us see you
Ady	Сэ шъо шъусэлъэгъу	Ащ	Ащ шъо сэ шъусегъэлъэгъу	he makes me see y'all
Kbd	Сэ фэ фызолъагъу	Абы	Абы фэ сэ фызегъэлъагъу	he makes me see y'all
Ady	Тэ шъо шъутэлъэгъу	Ащ	Ащ шъо тэ шъутегъэлъэгъу	he makes us see y'all
Kbd	Дэ фэ фыдолъагъу	Абы	Абы фэ дэ фыдегъэлъагъу	he makes us see y'all
Ady	Ащ о уелъэгъу	Ащ	Ащ о ащ урегъэлъэгъу	he makes him see you
Kbd	Абы уэ уелъагъу	Абы	Абы уэ абы урегъэлъагъу	he makes him see you
Ady	Ахэм о уалъэгъу	Ащ	Ащ о ахэм уарегъэлъэгъу	he makes them see you
Kbd	Абыхэм уэ уелъагъу	Абы	Абы уэ абыхэм урегъэлъагъу	he makes them see you
Ady	Ащ шъо шъуелъэгъу	Ащ	Ащ шъо ащ шъурегъэлъэгъу	he makes him see y'all
Kbd	Абы фэ фелъагъу	Абы	Абы фэ абы фрегъэлъагъу	he makes him see y'all
Ady	Ахэм шъо шъуалъэгъу	Ащ	Ащ шъо ахэм шъуарегъэлъэгъу	he makes them see y'all
Kbd	Абыхэм фэ фелъагъу	Абы	Абы фэ абыхэм фрегъэлъагъу	he makes them see y'all
Ady	Сэ ар сэлъэгъу	Ащ	Ащ ар сэ сегъэлъэгъу	he makes me see him
Kbd	Сэ ар солъагъу	Абы	Абы ар сэ зегъэлъагъу	he makes me see him
Ady	Тэ ар тэлъэгъу	Ащ	Ащ ар тэ тегъэлъэгъу	he makes us see him
Kbd	Дэ ар долъагъу	Абы	Абы ар дэ дегъэлъагъу	he makes us see him
Ady	О ар олъэгъу	Ащ	Ащ ар о уегъэлъэгъу	he makes you see him
Kbd	Уэ ар уолъагъу	Абы	Абы ар уэ уегъэлъагъу	he makes you see him
Ady	Шъо ар шъолъэгъу	Ащ	Ащ ар шъо шъуегъэлъэгъу	he makes y'all see him
Kbd	Фэ ар фолъагъу	Абы	Абы ар фэ вегъэлъагъу	he makes y'all see him
Ady	Ащ ар елъэгъу	Ащ	Ащ ар ащ регъэлъэгъу	he makes him see him
Kbd	Абы ар елъагъу	Абы	Абы ар абы ирегъэлъагъу	he makes him see him
Ady	Ахэм ар алъэгъу	Ащ	Ащ ар ахэм арегъэлъэгъу	he makes them see him
Kbd	Абыхэм ар елъагъу	Абы	Абы ар абыхэм ирегъэлъагъу	he makes them see him
Ady	Сэ ахэр сэлъэгъух	Ащ	Ащ ахэр сэ сегъэлъэгъух	he makes me see them
Kbd	Сэ ахэр солъагъу	Абы	Абы ахэр сэ зегъэлъагъу	he makes me see them
Ady	Тэ ахэр тэлъэгъух	Ащ	Ащ ахэр тэ тегъэлъэгъух	he makes us see them
Kbd	Дэ ахэр долъагъу	Абы	Абы ахэр дэ дегъэлъагъу	he makes us see them
Ady	О ахэр олъэгъух	Ащ	Ащ ахэр о уегъэлъэгъух	he makes you see them
Kbd	Уэ ахэр уолъагъу	Абы	Абы ахэр уэ уегъэлъагъу	he makes you see them
Ady	Шъо ахэр шъолъэгъух	Ащ	Ащ ахэр шъо шъуегъэлъэгъух	he makes y'all see them
Kbd	Фэ ахэр фолъагъу	Абы	Абы ахэр фэ вегъэлъагъу	he makes y'all see them
Ady	Ащ ахэр елъэгъух	Ащ	Ащ ахэр ащ регъэлъэгъух	he makes him see them
Kbd	Абы ахэр елъагъу	Абы	Абы ахэр абы ирегъэлъагъу	he makes him see them
Ady	Ахэм ахэр алъэгъух	Ащ	Ащ ахэр ахэм арегъэлъэгъух	he makes them see them
Kbd	Абыхэм ахэр елъагъу	Абы	Абы ахэр абыхэм ирегъэлъагъу	he makes them see them
Causer: 1st Person Plural (Тэ / Дэ)
Ady	Ащ о уелъэгъу	Тэ	Тэ о ащ уетэгъэлъэгъу	we make him see you
Kbd	Абы уэ уелъагъу	Дэ	Дэ уэ абы удогъэлъагъу	we make him see you
Ady	Ахэм о уалъэгъу	Тэ	Тэ о ахэм уатэгъэлъэгъу	we make them see you
Kbd	Абыхэм уэ уелъагъу	Дэ	Дэ уэ абыхэм удогъэлъагъу	we make them see you
Ady	Ащ шъо шъуелъэгъу	Тэ	Тэ шъо ащ шъуетэгъэлъэгъу	we make him see y'all
Kbd	Абы фэ фелъагъу	Дэ	Дэ фэ абы фыдогъэлъагъу	we make him see y'all
Ady	Ахэм шъо шъуалъэгъу	Тэ	Тэ шъо ахэм шъуатэгъэлъэгъу	we make them see y'all
Kbd	Абыхэм фэ фелъагъу	Дэ	Дэ фэ абыхэм фыдогъэлъагъу	we make them see y'all
Ady	О ар олъэгъу	Тэ	Тэ ар о отэгъэлъэгъу	we make you see him
Kbd	Уэ ар уолъагъу	Дэ	Дэ ар уэ удогъэлъагъу	we make you see him
Ady	Шъо ар шъолъэгъу	Тэ	Тэ ар шъо шъотэгъэлъэгъу	we make y'all see him
Kbd	Фэ ар фолъагъу	Дэ	Дэ ар фэ фыдогъэлъагъу	we make y'all see him
Ady	Ащ ар елъэгъу	Тэ	Тэ ар ащ етэгъэлъэгъу	we make him see him
Kbd	Абы ар елъагъу	Дэ	Дэ ар абы идогъэлъагъу	we make him see him
Ady	Ахэм ар алъэгъу	Тэ	Тэ ар ахэм атэгъэлъэгъу	we make them see him
Kbd	Абыхэм ар елъагъу	Дэ	Дэ ар абыхэм идогъэлъагъу	we make them see him
Ady	О ахэр олъэгъух	Тэ	Тэ ахэр о отэгъэлъэгъух	we make you see them
Kbd	Уэ ахэр уолъагъу	Дэ	Дэ ахэр уэ удогъэлъагъу	we make you see them
Ady	Шъо ахэр шъолъэгъух	Тэ	Тэ ахэр шъо шъотэгъэлъэгъух	we make y'all see them
Kbd	Фэ ахэр фолъагъу	Дэ	Дэ ахэр фэ фыдогъэлъагъу	we make y'all see them
Ady	Ащ ахэр елъэгъух	Тэ	Тэ ахэр ащ етэгъэлъэгъух	we make him see them
Kbd	Абы ахэр елъагъу	Дэ	Дэ ахэр абы идогъэлъагъу	we make him see them
Ady	Ахэм ахэр алъэгъух	Тэ	Тэ ахэр ахэм атэгъэлъэгъух	we make them see them
Kbd	Абыхэм ахэр елъагъу	Дэ	Дэ ахэр абыхэм идогъэлъагъу	we make them see them
Causer: 2nd Person Plural (Шъо / Фэ)
Ady	Ащ сэ селъэгъу	Шъо	Шъо сэ ащ сешъогъэлъэгъу	y'all make him see me
Kbd	Абы сэ селъагъу	Фэ	Фэ сэ абы сывогъэлъагъу	y'all make him see me
Ady	Ахэм сэ салъэгъу	Шъо	Шъо сэ ахэм сашъогъэлъэгъу	y'all make them see me
Kbd	Абыхэм сэ селъагъу	Фэ	Фэ сэ абыхэм сывогъэлъагъу	y'all make them see me
Ady	Ащ тэ телъэгъу	Шъо	Шъо тэ ащ тешъогъэлъэгъу	y'all make him see us
Kbd	Абы дэ делъагъу	Фэ	Фэ дэ абы дывогъэлъагъу	y'all make him see us
Ady	Ахэм тэ талъэгъу	Шъо	Шъо тэ ахэм ташъогъэлъэгъу	y'all make them see us
Kbd	Абыхэм дэ делъагъу	Фэ	Фэ дэ абыхэм дывогъэлъагъу	y'all make them see us
Ady	Сэ ар сэлъэгъу	Шъо	Шъо ар сэ сэшъогъэлъэгъу	y'all make me see him
Kbd	Сэ ар солъагъу	Фэ	Фэ ар сэ зывогъэлъагъу	y'all make me see him
Ady	Тэ ар тэлъэгъу	Шъо	Шъо ар тэ тэшъогъэлъэгъу	y'all make us see him
Kbd	Дэ ар долъагъу	Фэ	Фэ ар дэ дывогъэлъагъу	y'all make us see him
Ady	Ащ ар елъэгъу	Шъо	Шъо ар ащ ешъогъэлъэгъу	y'all make him see him
Kbd	Абы ар елъагъу	Фэ	Фэ ар абы ивогъэлъагъу	y'all make him see him
Ady	Ахэм ар алъэгъу	Шъо	Шъо ар ахэм ашъогъэлъэгъу	y'all make them see him
Kbd	Абыхэм ар елъагъу	Фэ	Фэ ар абыхэм ивогъэлъагъу	y'all make them see him
Ady	Сэ ахэр сэлъэгъух	Шъо	Шъо ахэр сэ сэшъогъэлъэгъух	y'all make me see them
Kbd	Сэ ахэр солъагъу	Фэ	Фэ ахэр сэ зывогъэлъагъу	y'all make me see them
Ady	Тэ ахэр тэлъэгъух	Шъо	Шъо ахэр тэ тэшъогъэлъэгъух	y'all make us see them
Kbd	Дэ ахэр долъагъу	Фэ	Фэ ахэр дэ дывогъэлъагъу	y'all make us see them
Ady	Ащ ахэр елъэгъух	Шъо	Шъо ахэр ащ ешъогъэлъэгъух	y'all make him see them
Kbd	Абы ахэр елъагъу	Фэ	Фэ ахэр абы ивогъэлъагъу	y'all make him see them
Ady	Ахэм ахэр алъэгъух	Шъо	Шъо ахэр ахэм ашъогъэлъэгъух	y'all make them see them
Kbd	Абыхэм ахэр елъагъу	Фэ	Фэ ахэр абыхэм ивогъэлъагъу	y'all make them see them
Causer: 3rd Person Plural (Ахэм / Абыхэм)
Ady	О сэ сыолъэгъу	Ахэм	Ахэм сэ о сыуагъэлъэгъу	they make you see me
Kbd	Уэ сэ сыболъагъу	Абыхэм	Абыхэм сэ уэ сыуегъэлъагъу	they make you see me
Ady	Шъо сэ сышъолъэгъу	Ахэм	Ахэм сэ шъо сышъуагъэлъэгъу	they make y'all see me
Kbd	Фэ сэ сыволъагъу	Абыхэм	Абыхэм сэ фэ сывегъэлъагъу	they make y'all see me
Ady	О тэ тыолъэгъу	Ахэм	Ахэм тэ о тыуагъэлъэгъу	they make you see us
Kbd	Уэ дэ дыболъагъу	Абыхэм	Абыхэм дэ уэ дыуегъэлъагъу	they make you see us
Ady	Шъо тэ тышъолъэгъу	Ахэм	Ахэм тэ шъо тышъуагъэлъэгъу	they make y'all see us
Kbd	Фэ дэ дыволъагъу	Абыхэм	Абыхэм дэ фэ дывегъэлъагъу	they make y'all see us
Ady	Ащ сэ селъэгъу	Ахэм	Ахэм сэ ащ срагъэлъэгъу	they make him see me
Kbd	Абы сэ селъагъу	Абыхэм	Абыхэм сэ абы срегъэлъагъу	they make him see me
Ady	Ахэм сэ салъэгъу	Ахэм	Ахэм сэ ахэм сарагъэлъэгъу	they make them see me
Kbd	Абыхэм сэ селъагъу	Абыхэм	Абыхэм сэ абыхэм срегъэлъагъу	they make them see me
Ady	Ащ тэ телъэгъу	Ахэм	Ахэм тэ ащ трагъэлъэгъу	they make him see us
Kbd	Абы дэ делъагъу	Абыхэм	Абыхэм дэ абы дрегъэлъагъу	they make him see us
Ady	Ахэм тэ талъэгъу	Ахэм	Ахэм тэ ахэм тарагъэлъэгъу	they make them see us
Kbd	Абыхэм дэ делъагъу	Абыхэм	Абыхэм дэ абыхэм дрегъэлъагъу	they make them see us
Ady	Сэ о усэлъэгъу	Ахэм	Ахэм о сэ усагъэлъэгъу	they make me see you
Kbd	Сэ уэ узолъагъу	Абыхэм	Абыхэм уэ сэ узегъэлъагъу	they make me see you
Ady	Тэ о утэлъэгъу	Ахэм	Ахэм о тэ утагъэлъэгъу	they make us see you
Kbd	Дэ уэ удолъагъу	Абыхэм	Абыхэм уэ дэ удегъэлъагъу	they make us see you
Ady	Сэ шъо шъусэлъэгъу	Ахэм	Ахэм шъо сэ шъусагъэлъэгъу	they make me see y'all
Kbd	Сэ фэ фызолъагъу	Абыхэм	Абыхэм фэ сэ фызегъэлъагъу	they make me see y'all
Ady	Тэ шъо шъутэлъэгъу	Ахэм	Ахэм шъо тэ шъутагъэлъэгъу	they make us see y'all
Kbd	Дэ фэ фыдолъагъу	Абыхэм	Абыхэм фэ дэ фыдегъэлъагъу	they make us see y'all
Ady	Ащ о уелъэгъу	Ахэм	Ахэм о ащ урагъэлъэгъу	they make him see you
Kbd	Абы уэ уелъагъу	Абыхэм	Абыхэм уэ абы урегъэлъагъу	they make him see you
Ady	Ахэм о уалъэгъу	Ахэм	Ахэм о ахэм уарагъэлъэгъу	they make them see you
Kbd	Абыхэм уэ уелъагъу	Абыхэм	Абыхэм уэ абыхэм урегъэлъагъу	they make them see you
Ady	Ащ шъо шъуелъэгъу	Ахэм	Ахэм шъо ащ шъурагъэлъэгъу	they make him see y'all
Kbd	Абы фэ фелъагъу	Абыхэм	Абыхэм фэ абы фрегъэлъагъу	they make him see y'all
Ady	Ахэм шъо шъуалъэгъу	Ахэм	Ахэм шъо ахэм шъуарагъэлъэгъу	they make them see y'all
Kbd	Абыхэм фэ фелъагъу	Абыхэм	Абыхэм фэ абыхэм фрегъэлъагъу	they make them see y'all
Ady	Сэ ар сэлъэгъу	Ахэм	Ахэм ар сэ сагъэлъэгъу	they make me see him
Kbd	Сэ ар солъагъу	Абыхэм	Абыхэм ар сэ зегъэлъагъу	they make me see him
Ady	Тэ ар тэлъэгъу	Ахэм	Ахэм ар тэ тагъэлъэгъу	they make us see him
Kbd	Дэ ар долъагъу	Абыхэм	Абыхэм ар дэ дегъэлъагъу	they make us see him
Ady	О ар олъэгъу	Ахэм	Ахэм ар о уагъэлъэгъу	they make you see him
Kbd	Уэ ар уолъагъу	Абыхэм	Абыхэм ар уэ уегъэлъагъу	they make you see him
Ady	Шъо ар шъолъэгъу	Ахэм	Ахэм ар шъо шъуагъэлъэгъу	they make y'all see him
Kbd	Фэ ар фолъагъу	Абыхэм	Абыхэм ар фэ вегъэлъагъу	they make y'all see him
Ady	Ащ ар елъэгъу	Ахэм	Ахэм ар ащ рагъэлъэгъу	they make him see him
Kbd	Абы ар елъагъу	Абыхэм	Абыхэм ар абы ирегъэлъагъу	they make him see him
Ady	Ахэм ар алъэгъу	Ахэм	Ахэм ар ахэм арагъэлъэгъу	they make them see him
Kbd	Абыхэм ар елъагъу	Абыхэм	Абыхэм ар абыхэм ирегъэлъагъу	they make them see him
Ady	Сэ ахэр сэлъэгъух	Ахэм	Ахэм ахэр сэ сагъэлъэгъух	they make me see them
Kbd	Сэ ахэр солъагъу	Абыхэм	Абыхэм ахэр сэ зегъэлъагъу	they make me see them
Ady	Тэ ахэр тэлъэгъух	Ахэм	Ахэм ахэр тэ тагъэлъэгъух	they make us see them
Kbd	Дэ ахэр долъагъу	Абыхэм	Абыхэм ахэр дэ дегъэлъагъу	they make us see them
Ady	О ахэр олъэгъух	Ахэм	Ахэм ахэр о уагъэлъэгъух	they make you see them
Kbd	Уэ ахэр уолъагъу	Абыхэм	Абыхэм ахэр уэ уегъэлъагъу	they make you see them
Ady	Шъо ахэр шъолъэгъух	Ахэм	Ахэм ахэр шъо шъуагъэлъэгъух	they make y'all see them
Kbd	Фэ ахэр фолъагъу	Абыхэм	Абыхэм ахэр фэ вегъэлъагъу	they make y'all see them
Ady	Ащ ахэр елъэгъух	Ахэм	Ахэм ахэр ащ рагъэлъэгъух	they make him see them
Kbd	Абы ахэр елъагъу	Абыхэм	Абыхэм ахэр абы ирегъэлъагъу	they make him see them
Ady	Ахэм ахэр алъэгъух	Ахэм	Ахэм ахэр ахэм арагъэлъэгъух	they make them see them
Kbd	Абыхэм ахэр елъагъу	Абыхэм	Абыхэм ахэр абыхэм ирегъэлъагъу	they make them see them

=== Number in modern Kabardian ===
As throughout, modern Kabardian marks no 3rd-person plural (causer, causee, or object) on the causative: it keeps the singular and carries plurality on the free pronoun (абыхэм / ахэр). Where Adyghe shows the older 3PL agent (ergative а-), modern Kabardian uses the singular (е-):

3PL causer: Adyghe keeps the distinction; modern Kabardian uses the singular
Adyghe (3PL agent)	Plurals	Modern Kabardian	English
Ахэм сэ сагъэплъэ	3P ERG → 3S ERG	Абыхэм сэ сегъэплъэ	they make me look
Ахэм ар агъэплъэ	3P ERG → 3S ERG	Абыхэм ар егъэплъэ	they make him look
