= Tshobdun language =

Qiangic language spoken in Sichuan, China

Tshobdun
- Native to: China
- Region: Sichuan
- Language family: Sino-Tibetan: Qiangic; Rgyalrongic; rGyalrong; Tshobdun

Language codes
- ISO 639-3: (included in Jiarong [jya])
- Glottolog: tsho1240

Tshobdun (Chinese: 草登话; pinyin: Cǎodēnghuà) is a Rgyalrong language spoken in Sichuan, China. It is surrounded by the Zbu, Japhug, and Amdo Tibetan languages.

== Phonology ==
=== Consonants ===
Consonants
		Labial	Alveolar		Retroflex	Alveolo- palatal	Palatal	Velar/ Uvular
		Labial	plain	sibilant	Retroflex	Alveolo- palatal	Palatal	Velar/ Uvular
Nasal		m	n				ɲ	ŋ
Plosive/ Affricate	voiceless	p	t	t͡s	ʈ͡ʂ	t͡ɕ	c	k
Plosive/ Affricate	aspirated	pʰ	tʰ	t͡sʰ	ʈ͡ʂʰ	t͡ɕʰ	cʰ	kʰ
Plosive/ Affricate	voiced	b	d	d͡z	ɖ͡ʐ	d͡ʑ	ɟ	ɡ
Plosive/ Affricate	prenasalized	ᵐb	ⁿd	ⁿd͡z	ⁿɖ͡ʐ	ⁿd͡ʑ	ᶮɟ	ᵑɡ
Fricative	voiceless			s		ɕ		χ
Fricative	voiced			z		ʑ		ʁ
Lateral			l					
Sonorant		w	r				j	

=== Vowels ===
Vowels
	Front	Central	Back
Close	i		u
Mid	e	ə	o
Near-open		ɐ	uɔ
Open		a	uɔ
