= Andative and venitive in Circassian =

Verbal deixis and spatial orientation in Circassian languages

In the Circassian languages (such as Adyghe and Kabardian), the distinction between andative and venitive motion is a pervasive and highly productive feature of verbal morphology. The spatial orientation of an action relative to the deictic center (typically the speaker or the addressee) is marked primarily by the venitive prefix къ- [q-] — often referred to in linguistic literature as the cislocative marker. It surfaces phonologically as qV- in Circassian.

When this prefix is absent, the verb generally defaults to an andative (movement away from the deictic center) or a spatially neutral direction. Adding the prefix къ- explicitly reorients the action, indicating motion "coming" or "bringing" towards the active deictic center. Because Circassian is a highly polysynthetic language, this directional prefix frequently interacts with other applicative prefixes (such as dative or comitative markers) to encode complex spatial and interpersonal relationships directly into the verb.

== Spatial and physical directionality ==
=== Motion and physical displacement ===
This spatial distinction applies universally to basic verbs of motion, displacement, and perception. The presence of the venitive prefix categorically shifts the meaning from "going" to "coming," or "taking" to "bringing".

By comparing the base andative forms to their cislocative counterparts, the inward spatial reorientation becomes clear (morphemes separated by dashes correspond to the morphological breakdown):

Andative (Away / Neutral)	IPA / Gloss	Translation	Venitive (Toward Center)	IPA / Gloss	Translation
макӀо сэкӀо	/ma-kʷʼa/ [3SG.ABS.DYN-go] /sa-kʷʼa/ [1SG.ABS.DYN-go]	"(s)he goes (away)" "I go"	къакӀо скъакӀо	/qa-kʷʼa/ [VEN.DYN-go] /s-qa-kʷʼa/ [1SG.ABS-VEN.DYN-go]	"(s)he comes (here)" "I come"
сэчъэ	/sa-t͡ʂa/ [1SG.ABS.DYN-run]	"I go running"	скъачъэ	/s-qa-t͡ʂa/ [1SG.ABS-VEN.DYN-run]	"I come running"
ехьы сэхьы	/ja-ħə/ [3SG.ERG-carry] /sa-ħə/ [1SG.ABS.DYN-carry]	"(s)he takes (away)" "I take"	къехьы къэсэхьы	/q-ja-ħə/ [VEN-3SG.ERG-carry] /qa-sa-ħə/ [VEN.DAT-1SG.ABS.DYN-carry]	"(s)he brings (here)" "I bring here"
сэплъэ	/sa-pɬa/ [1SG.ABS.DYN-look]	"I look there"	скъаплъэ	/s-qa-pɬa/ [1SG.ABS-VEN.DYN-look]	"I look toward you / look here"
нэсы сынэсы	/na-sə/ [LOC.DAT-reach] /sə-na-sə/ [1SG.ABS.DIR-LOC.DAT-reach]	"(s)he reaches (there)" "I reach"	къэсы сыкъэсы	/qa-sə/ [VEN.DAT-reach] /sə-qa-sə/ [1SG.ABS.DIR-VEN.DAT-reach]	"(s)he arrives (here)" "I arrive"

The same spatial mechanics define striking and shooting actions. For example, мао (/ma-wa/ [DYN.DAT-strike.INTR]) means "(s)he strikes away/there," while къао (/qa-wa/ [VEN.DAT-strike.INTR]) means "(s)he strikes here." When referring to modern artillery or combat, мао signifies that rockets are being fired away to a distant target, whereas къао signifies that rockets are being fired here (incoming).

Implicit contextual targets (The missing у-) Because the venitive prefix is a spatial marker rather than a strict personal pronoun, it can pragmatically imply a destination without explicitly stating it. If a speaker uses these motion verbs completely out of context, they are inherently understood as directed toward the listener:

- Скъаплъэ "I am looking toward you."
- Сэчъэ "I run" → Сыкъачъэ "I run towards you."
- Мыжъор къэсдзыщт "I will throw the rock towards you."

It is important to emphasize that grammatically speaking, the second-person pronoun у- / п- ("you") is not included in these forms. Technically, the verbs simply mean "I look hither," "I run hither," or "I will throw the rock hither." However, much like how the English phrase "I'm coming" is automatically understood as "I'm coming to your house," and "I'm bringing the stuff" implies "I'm bringing the stuff to your place," Circassian defaults the unspecified "here" to the listener's location during direct address. Context matters deeply here; the physical displacement implicitly anchors to the conversational partner.

=== Vertical orientation and the divine ===
The venitive prefix is frequently associated with actions originating from the sky or the divine (such as weather or heavenly deities). However, it is not the downward trajectory itself that triggers the venitive marker, but rather the human perspective.

Because humanity is situated on Earth, actions falling from the sky are moving *toward* our spatial deictic center. This mirrors the English distinction between saying "the rain is coming down to us" versus "the rain is going down." If the narrative perspective were to shift to an airplane or a deity in the heavens looking downward, the prefix къы- could be absent, signifying that the action is moving away from the sky-bound center (e.g., "we will make rain go down to earth").

From the default terrestrial perspective, the following actions require the venitive marker:

Word / Sentence	IPA	Gloss	Translation
Уашъом къепсы	/waʃʷa-m q-ja-psə/	sky-OBL VEN-3SG.IO-shine	"It shines from the heaven"
Метеорхэр къефэхы	/mjetjewar-xa-r q-ja-fa-xə/	meteor-PL-ABS VEN-3SG.IO-fall-down	"Meteors are falling [down to us]"
къешхы	/q-ja-ʃxə/	VEN-3SG.IO-rain	"It rains [down to us]"
къесы	/q-ja-sə/	VEN-3SG.IO-snow	"It snows [down to us]"
Тхьэм къэтфригъэхыгъ	/tħa-m qa-t-f-r-jə-ʁa-xə-ʁ/	God-ERG VEN.DAT-1PL.IO-BEN-3SG.IO-3SG.ERG-CAUS-fall-PST	"God descended it for us [toward us on the land]"
Тхьэр къеохыгъ	/tħa-r q-ja-wa-xə-ʁ/	God-ABS VEN-3SG.IO-strike.DAT-fall-PST	"God struck down [toward us on the land]"

=== Transfer, communication, and the imperative mood ===
Much like the pragmatic distinction in English where one says "come to me" rather than "go to me," or "bring it to me" rather than "take it to me," Circassian rigorously applies this spatial logic. However, in Circassian, this logic extends far beyond physical locomotion. The venitive prefix is obligatory for verbs of transfer, communication, and interaction whenever the action is directed toward the speaker:

- къысэт (/qə-sa-t/ [VEN-1SG.IO.DAT-give]) "give it to me"
- къысаӀу (/qə-sa-ʔʷ/ [VEN-1SG.IO.DAT-say]) "say it to me"
- къысэплъ (/qə-sa-pɬ/ [VEN-1SG.IO.DAT-look]) "look at me"

These examples frequently function as direct commands. Because the action is inherently directed toward the speaker ("I"), it is almost grammatically mandatory to add the prefix къ- in these contexts. Because it explicitly directs the action inward, it is a crucial component of the imperative mood when commanding someone to do something that benefits or reaches the speaker. Issuing a command without the venitive prefix implies the action should be directed away from the speaker or done generally:

Base Form (Andative)	Meaning	With Cislocative (Venitive)	Meaning
дзы (/d͡zə/)	"throw away / throw it"	къэдз (/qa-d͡z/)	"throw it here / to me"
ты (/tə/)	"give away / give it"	къэт (/qa-t/)	"give it here / to me"
Ӏо (/ʔʷa/)	"say it"	къаӀу (/qa-ʔʷ/)	"say it here / to me"
плъэ (/pɬa/)	"look"	къаплъ (/qa-pɬ/)	"look here / at me"
хьы (/ħə/)	"carry it away"	къэхь (/qa-ħ/)	"carry it here / to me"
щэ (/ɕa/)	"lead it away"	къащ (/qa-ɕ/)	"lead it here / to me"
фы (/fə/)	"drive it away"	къэф (/qa-f/)	"drive it here / to me"
Ӏух (/ʔʷəx/)	"open it from this side"	къыӀух (/qə-ʔʷəx/)	"open it from the other side / toward speaker"

It is important to emphasize that even though these venitive imperative examples do not explicitly contain the first-person indirect object marker -с- ("to me"), they function exactly like the implicit listener examples discussed earlier. Because the prefix grounds the action in the speaker's "here," a command to perform an action into that space pragmatically defaults to the speaker as the beneficiary.

== Deictic projection (Shifting centers) ==
=== The misconception of "toward the speaker" ===
Because the Circassian venitive system is highly dynamic, it is one of the most widely misunderstood facets of the language. A pervasive oversimplification among learners is that the prefix къы~ strictly and exclusively means "moving toward the speaker."

In reality, къы~ does not necessarily mean "toward the speaker"—it means "toward the relevant 'here'." While the speaker is often the default center of attention, this spatial focus is fluid. It can project onto the listener, or even onto a third party, depending on the context of the interaction.

=== Direction towards the listener (explicit 2nd person) ===
When you speak directly to someone, the conversational focus naturally shifts to the listener. If the action is directed explicitly at them, the grammatical second-person pronouns (о, у-, п-) combine with the venitive prefix to show the action is moving into their personal sphere:

Sentence	IPA	Gloss	Translation
Сэ о скъыоплъы	/sa wa s-qə-wa-pɬə/	1SG.PRON 2SG.PRON 1SG.ABS-VEN-2SG.IO.DAT-look	"I look at you"
Ар о къыоплъы	/a-r wa qə-wa-pɬə/	3SG.ABS 2SG.PRON VEN-2SG.IO.DAT-look	"He looks at you"
Сэ о ар къыосэты	/sa wa a-r qə-wa-sa-tə/	1SG.PRON 2SG.PRON 3SG.ABS VEN-2SG.IO.DAT-1SG.ERG.DYN-give	"I give it to you"
Ащ о ар къыуеты	/a-ɕ wa a-r qə-wa-ja-tə/	3SG.ERG 2SG.PRON 3SG.ABS VEN-2SG.IO.DAT-3SG.ERG-give	"He gives it to you"
Сэ о ар къыплъэсэдзы	/sa wa a-r qə-p-ɬa-sa-d͡zə/	1SG.PRON 2SG.PRON 3SG.ABS VEN-2SG.IO-LOC.DAT-1SG.ERG.DYN-throw	"I throw it toward you"
Ащ о ар къыплъедзы	/a-ɕ wa a-r qə-p-ɬ-ja-d͡zə/	3SG.ERG 2SG.PRON 3SG.ABS VEN-2SG.IO-LOC-3SG.ERG-throw	"He throws it toward you"
Сэ о ар къыосэӀо	/sa wa a-r qə-wa-sa-ʔʷa/	1SG.PRON 2SG.PRON 3SG.ABS VEN-2SG.IO.DAT-1SG.ERG.DYN-say	"I say it to you"
Ащ о ар къыуеӀо	/a-ɕ wa a-r qə-w-ja-ʔʷa/	3SG.ERG 2SG.PRON 3SG.ABS VEN-2SG.IO-3SG.ERG-say	"He says it to you"

=== Third-party contexts and group inclusion ===
This same contextual shift applies when talking about a third party. In English, you might say "I went to him" if your focus is on leaving your current location, but you might say "I came to him" if the narrative focus is already centered on his location. Similarly, you might say "I took it to him" versus "I brought it to him." Circassian formally encodes these shifts in perspective:

- If the action moves away from the established narrative center toward the third party, the andative (base) form is used: Сэ ащ сэкӀо "I go to him" / Сэ ащ ар сэхьы "I take it to him."
- If the narrative focus is already anchored at the third party's location, and the action enters that space, the venitive prefix is required: Сэ ащ скъакӀо "I come to him" / Сэ ащ ар къэсэхьы "I bring it to him."

This shift is also apparent when discussing inclusion into a group or assembly. Consider the difference between the following statements regarding a man joining a council (хасэ):

- ЛӀыр хасэм хэхьагъ "The man joined the council [away from speaker]."
- ЛӀыр хасэм къыхэхьагъ "The man joined the council [here]."

If the speaker is not part of the council and is merely stating a general fact, the first (andative) form is more appropriate. However, if the speaker is themselves a member of the council, or physically present at the council meeting, the second form with the venitive prefix къ- is highly preferred, as the man is entering the speaker's deictic and social space.

This fluid projection to a group is also evident in public speaking. When a leader gives a speech to a crowd, the verb къэгущыӀэ (/qa-gʷəɕəʔa/ [VEN.DAT-speak]) is used. Even though the crowd is a third-party entity ("them") from the narrator's perspective, the speaker is directing their words outward toward the audience, effectively setting the crowd as the spatial center of the action.

Similarly, the focus can project onto specific subjects of interest within a third-party context:

Sentence	IPA	Gloss	Translation
КӀэлэцӀыкӀум къеплъ	/t͡ʃʼalat͡sʼəkʷʼum q-ja-pɬ/	boy.DIM-OBL VEN-3SG.IO-look	"Look at the little boy [there]"
О пшъэшъэжъыем шъэжъыер къыӀэх	/wa pʂaʂaʐəjam ʂaʐəjar qə-ʔax/	2SG.PRON girl.DIM-OBL knife.DIM-ABS VEN-hand-take	"Take the knife away from the little girl"

- In the first example, even though the boy is "there," because the narrative attention is directed at him as the center, the venitive къеплъ is used.
- In the second example, the girl acts as the deictic center. The suffix -Ӏэх translates to "take away," so adding the venitive means "to take away from her center" or "to take away from her."

== Translocative contrast in Kabardian ==
While both Adyghe and Kabardian heavily utilize the cislocative prefix to mark inward motion, Kabardian additionally possesses a fully productive translocative prefix, н- (n-), denoting movement explicitly away from the deictic center.

In Adyghe, this historical translocative is fossilized and only appears in a few instances, such as the verb нэсын ("to reach [there]", opposed to the venitive къэсын, "to arrive [here]"). In Kabardian, however, н- can attach to almost all verbs just like the cislocative prefix къ-.

This creates a direct morphological contrast for outward versus inward projection. Building upon the earlier example of a man joining a council, a Kabardian speaker can explicitly mark the outward direction:

- ЛӀыр хасэм ныхохьэ: "The man joins the council [there/away from speaker]" (using translocative н-).
- ЛӀыр хасэм къыхохьэ: "The man joins the council [here/where the speaker is]" (using cislocative къ-).

The translocative can also add outward emphasis to communication. For instance, a Kabardian speaker might use нывжызоӀэ versus the standard вжызоӀэ ("I am telling it to y'all") to emphatically project the statement outward to the listeners.

== Inverse marking and perspective shifts ==
=== Inversion of subject/object relation (3rd person) ===
In certain constructions involving a 3rd person argument (he/she/they), adding къы~ shifts the perspective entirely, effectively swapping the subject and object roles relative to the speaker. This happens because the prefix redirects the trajectory of the verb "inward" toward the established center (the speaker).

- Сыфэд "I am like him" (My traits project outward to match his) → Къысфэд "He is like me" (His traits project inward to match mine).
- СыдакӀо "I go with him" (I join his outward journey) → КъыздакӀо "He comes with me" (He joins my inward journey).

Тэ кӀалэм тыдакӀо, шъо пшъашъэр къышъудакӀо
Тэ кӀалэ-м ты-дэ-кӀо, шъо пшъашъэ-р къы-шъу-дэ-кӀо
We boy-OBL 1PL-COM-go, you.PL girl-ABS DIR-2PL-COM-go
"We are going with the boy; the girl is coming with you."

==== Interaction between 1st and 2nd persons ====
This inversion rule only applies when a 3rd person is involved. When a 1st person (I/we) and a 2nd person (you) interact with each other, adding the cislocative prefix does not swap their roles. It merely adds the directional or venitive nuance to the existing relationship:

Base Form	IPA / Gloss	Translation	With Cislocative (къы~)	IPA / Gloss	Translation
Сыпфэд	/sə-p-fad/ [1SG.ABS-2SG.IO-like]	I am like you	Скъыпфэд	/s-qə-p-fad/ [1SG.ABS-VEN-2SG.IO-like]	I am like you (directional)
Усфэд	/wə-s-fad/ [2SG.ABS-1SG.IO-like]	You are like me	Укъысфэд	/wə-qə-s-fad/ [2SG.ABS-VEN-1SG.IO-like]	You are like me (directional)
СыпдэкӀо	/sə-p-da-kʷʼa/ [1SG.ABS-2SG.IO-COM-go]	I go with you	СкъыпдэкӀо	/s-qə-p-da-kʷʼa/ [1SG.ABS-VEN-2SG.IO-COM-go]	I come with you
УсдэкӀо	/wə-s-da-kʷʼa/ [2SG.ABS-1SG.IO-COM-go]	You go with me	УкъысдэкӀо	/wə-qə-s-da-kʷʼa/ [2SG.ABS-VEN-1SG.IO-COM-go]	You come with me

=== Storytelling and inverse marking ===
In narrative discourse, the venitive prefix frequently functions as a quasi-inverse marker regulating the flow of interaction between two characters.

When two 3rd-person characters (Person A and Person B) interact in a story, the prefix tracks the flow of interaction back to the conversational center. The initial action from Person A to Person B might lack the venitive, but the reciprocal reaction or answer from Person B back to Person A will carry the venitive prefix къ-, often combined with the reversive/return suffix -жьы- (-ʑə-):

Word	IPA	Gloss	Translation
риӀуагъ	/r-jə-ʔʷa-ʁ/	3SG.IO-3SG.ERG-say-PST	"he said it to him"
къыриӀожьыгъ	/qə-r-jə-ʔʷa-ʑə-ʁ/	VEN-3SG.IO-3SG.ERG-say-REVS-PST	"he said it back to him"
еплъыгъ	/ja-pɬə-ʁ/	3SG.IO-look-PST	"he looked at him"
къеплъыжьыгъ	/q-ja-pɬə-ʑə-ʁ/	VEN-3SG.IO-look-REVS-PST	"he looked back at him"
ритыгъ	/r-jə-tə-ʁ/	3SG.IO-3SG.ERG-give-PST	"he gave it to him"
къыритыжьыгъ	/qə-r-jə-tə-ʑə-ʁ/	VEN-3SG.IO-3SG.ERG-give-REVS-PST	"he gave it back to him"

Furthermore, when multiple 3rd-person participants are involved, the prefix reliably tracks the most prominent discourse participant (the proximate argument). The venitive marker will anchor actions directed toward this central character, and may temporarily drop if the narrative focus shifts to a different local center.

== The 1 > 2 > 3 person hierarchy ==
Whether the directional/venitive (къэ- / къы-) is merely an optional extra or is effectively obligatory is governed by a ranking of the persons:

1 > 2 > 3 — the speaker (1) outranks the addressee (2), who outranks any third party (3).

A combination is direct when the subject outranks or ties its object — e.g. 1→3 "I look at him", 1→2 "I look at you", 3→3 "he looks at him" — and inverse when a lower-ranked subject acts on a higher-ranked object — 2→1 "you look at me", 3→1 "he looks at me", 3→2 "he looks at you". In a direct combination the bare (andative) form is normal and the venitive is only an optional extra; in an inverse combination the action runs up the hierarchy toward the deictic centre, so the venitive is semi-mandatory and the bare form is dispreferred. Kabardian sharpens this in two ways: it requires the directional for every local (1st/2nd-person) object, and it marks the purely outward 1→2 direction with the translocative н(ы)- — direct proof of the ranking, since from the speaker the addressee lies away from the centre.

The subsections below check this against the singular person combinations, one verb class at a time, using the model verbs of the conjugation paradigms.

=== Monovalent intransitive: no object to rank ===
With a single absolutive argument there is nothing to outrank, so the venitive keeps only its plain "toward here" sense and stays optional for every person: Сэплъэ / Оплъэ / Маплъэ "I / you / he look(s)" (Kabardian Соплъэ / Уоплъэ / Маплъэ), each optionally taking the directional — Сэплъэ → Сыкъэплъэ "I look this way", Маплъэ → Къэплъэ "he looks this way" (Kabardian Соплъэ → Сыкъоплъэ).

=== Bivalent intransitive: the clearest case ===
Here the subject is absolutive and the object oblique, and the directional tracks the hierarchy exactly (verb еплъын / еплъын "to look at", present tense):

The directional follows 1 > 2 > 3
Subject → Object	Direct / inverse	Adyghe	Kabardian
1 → 3 "I look at him"	direct	Сеплъы	Соплъ
2 → 3 "you look at him"	direct	Уеплъы	Уоплъ
3 → 3 "he looks at him"	direct (tie)	Еплъы	Йоплъ
1 → 2 "I look at you"	direct (1 > 2)	Сыоплъы	Сыноплъ (translocative)
2 → 1 "you look at me"	inverse	Укъысэплъы	Укъызоплъ
3 → 1 "he looks at me"	inverse	Къысэплъы	Къызоплъ
3 → 2 "he looks at you"	inverse	Къыоплъы	Къоплъ

The three inverse cells (a lower-ranked subject acting on a higher-ranked object) obligatorily carry the venitive къ- / къ-; the direct cells leave it optional. The decisive cell is Kabardian Сыноплъ "I look at you": 1→2 is a direct combination, yet Kabardian still marks it — with the translocative н- ("away"), the exact mirror of the cislocative къ- ("toward") in Укъызоплъ "you look at me". From the speaker, the addressee is "out there" — overt proof that 1 outranks 2.

=== Bivalent transitive: no inverse gap ===
A transitive verb's object is absolutive (a core argument), not oblique — and here the hierarchy leaves no inverse gap at all. Even the would-be inverse cells keep a plain base form, and the venitive stays optional throughout (verb ылъэгъун / лъагъун "to see", present):

Absolutive object → directional optional everywhere
Subject → Object	Adyghe	Kabardian
1 → 3 "I see him"	Сэлъэгъу	Солъагъу
2 → 3 "you see him"	Олъэгъу	Уолъагъу
1 → 2 "I see you"	Усэлъэгъу	Узолъагъу
2 → 1 "you see me"	Сыолъэгъу	Сыболъагъу
3 → 1 "he sees me"	Селъэгъу	Селъагъу
3 → 2 "he sees you"	Уелъэгъу	Уелъагъу
3 → 3 "he sees him"	Елъэгъу	Елъагъу

None of these forms carries an obligatory къ-: adding the venitive (Сэлъэгъу → Къэсэлъэгъу "I see him [this way]") is a free option in every cell, the inverse ones included. The hierarchy effect is therefore tied to the oblique object slot — when the object is absolutive, 1 > 2 > 3 does not force the directional.

=== Trivalent ditransitive: the indirect object ===
A ditransitive verb adds an oblique indirect object (the recipient), and the directional tracks the ranking between the subject and that recipient — exactly as in the bivalent intransitive (verb етын / етын "to give", present, with the direct object "it" = 3SG):

The directional follows subject vs. recipient on 1 > 2 > 3
Subject → Recipient	Direct / inverse	Adyghe	Kabardian
1 → 3 "I give it to him"	direct	Есэты	Изот
2 → 3 "you give it to him"	direct	Еоты	Ибот
3 → 3 "he gives it to him"	direct (tie)	Реты	Ирет
1 → 2 "I give it to you"	direct (1 > 2)	Къыосэты	Узот
2 → 1 "you give it to me"	inverse	Къысэоты	Къызыбот
3 → 1 "he gives it to me"	inverse	Къысеты	Къызет
3 → 2 "he gives it to you"	inverse	Къыуеты	Къыует

Once again the three inverse cells (the recipient outranks the subject) obligatorily carry the venitive къ- / къ- in both languages, while the direct 1→3 / 2→3 / 3→3 cells stay bare. The 1→2 "give it to you" is direct; here Adyghe cites the directional form Къыосэты (the gift aimed at the addressee), whereas Kabardian leaves it bare (Узот).

=== Summary ===
Across the verb classes the directional obeys a single rule, driven by the 1 > 2 > 3 ranking and keyed to the object's case:

- No object (monovalent intransitive): nothing to rank — the venitive is a free "toward here" option for any person.
- Oblique object (bivalent intransitive; trivalent indirect object): the directional tracks the ranking — inverse combinations (a subject outranked by its object/recipient) force the venitive къэ- / къы-, while direct ones leave it optional.
- Absolutive object (bivalent transitive): no inverse gap — the venitive stays optional everywhere.

Kabardian then generalises the directional to every local object and, in the bivalent intransitive, even spells out the outward 1→2 direction with the translocative н- (Сыноплъ "I look at you") — the single clearest proof that 1 outranks 2.

== Sudden action and unexpected events ==
Beyond strictly spatial and social orientation, the cislocative prefix frequently extends into the temporal and experiential domain to mark sudden, unexpected, or spontaneous actions. Because sudden events "arrive" into the speaker's awareness or physical space without prior buildup, they are grammatically treated as moving toward the deictic center.

This usage is particularly common with sudden illnesses, accidents, or abrupt environmental changes:

- КӀалэр къэсмэджагъ "The boy got sick [suddenly]."
- Хьэр кӀалэм къецэкъагъ, дохтырым тщэн фай псынкӀэу "The dog bit the boy, we need to take him to the doctor quickly."

In these cases, the venitive prefix къ - emphasizes that the action abruptly "entered" the narrative or physical reality, establishing a sense of immediacy and urgency rather than literal physical locomotion.

== Distal framing (Non-motion verbs) ==
When къы~ is added to verbs that don't involve inherent movement (like eating, working, or studying), it serves a related but conceptually distinct spatial function. It indicates that the action took place at a distal location (away from the deictic center), with the implication that the subject or the narrative focus has since reoriented back toward the deictic center. Essentially, it signals that an action occurred "over there" relative to the speaker's current "here."

This is frequently used in storytelling and recounting events that happened elsewhere, often working in tandem with the locative prefix щы- (there) fulfilling an ablative-venitive function:

Sentence	Translation	Contextual Function
Сэ рестораным скӀуи скъыщышхагъ	"I went to the restaurant and ate there."	The venitive prefix frames the eating as having taken place elsewhere, indicating the speaker has since returned.
Сэ Америкэм скъыщеджэгъагъ	"I studied in America."	Emphasizes that the studying occurred in a distant location relative to the speaker's current conversational setting.
ЛӀыр Ӏофым кӀуи къэлэжьагъ къинэу	"The man went to work and worked hard (there)."	The venitive on "worked" (къэлэжьагъ) frames the labor as having taken place at a separate, distal location.

Because the venitive prefix in these contexts inherently carries the meaning of an "action situated away from here," its usage is governed by strict rules of spatial proximity. It is grammatically and contextually inappropriate to use the venitive prefix for non-motion actions occurring in the immediate vicinity of the speaker. You can only say ЛӀыр къэлажьэ ("the man works") if the man is working at a distance or in another location. However, if the man is working in the same room or right next to the speaker, using the venitive prefix is incorrect, as the action is proximate to the deictic center rather than distal.
