= Associated motion =

Grammatical category

Associated motion is a grammatical category whose main function is to associate a motion component to the event expressed by the verbal root.

This category is attested in Pama–Nyungan languages, where it was first discovered (Koch 1984, Wilkins 1991), in Tacanan, in rGyalrong languages, and in Panoan languages.

Languages with associated motion present a contrast between association motion and purposive motion verb constructions, as in the following examples from Japhug Rgyalrong.

laχtɕʰa ɯ-kɯ-χtɯ jɤ-ari-a
thing 3SG-NMLZ-buy AOR-go-1SG
'I went to buy things'

laχtɕʰa ɕ-tɤ-χtɯ-t-a
thing TRANSLOC-AOR-buy-PST-1SG
'I went to buy things'

Although both examples have the same English translation, they differ in that (2) with the translocative associated motion prefix ɕ- implies that the buying did take place, while (1) with the motion verb does not imply the buying took place, even though the going did. The distinction made by the translocative is similar to the distinction made in "I went and bought things".

In addition to parameters such as relative time of occurrence (prior, concurrent, subsequent motion), argument of motion, deixis (motion towards or from the deictic center), associated motion systems can also encode speed, and these markers can then evolve into celerative markers exclusively encoding speed.

== Bibliography ==
- Guillaume, Antoine (2006). "La catégorie du 'mouvement associé' en cavineña: apport à une typologie de l'encodage du mouvement et de la trajectoire". Bulletin de la Société de Linguistique de Paris. 101 (2): 415–436. doi:10.2143/bsl.101.1.2019831.
- —— (2008). A Grammar of Cavineña. Berlin: Mouton de Gruyter.
- —— (2009). "Les suffixes verbaux de mouvement associé en cavineña" (PDF). Faits de Langues. 1 (2): 181–204. doi:10.1163/19589514-034-02-900000008. Archived from the original (PDF) on 2016-03-03.
- —— (2016). "Associated motion in South America: Typological and areal perspectives". Linguistic Typology. 20 (1): 81–177. doi:10.1515/lingty-2016-0003.
- Jacques, Guillaume (2013). "Harmonization and disharmonization of affix ordering and basic word order". Linguistic Typology. 17 (2): 187–215. doi:10.1515/lity-2013-0009.
- Koch, Harold. 1984. The category of ‘associated motion’ in Kaytej. Language in Central Australia 1: 23–34.
- Tallman, Adam J. R. 2021. Associated Motion in Chácono (Pano) in Typological Perspective. In Antoine Guillaume, Harold Koch (eds.): Associated Motion. (Empirical Studies in Language). De Gruyter Mouton, p. 419–450.
- Wilkins, David P. 1991. The semantics, pragmatics and diachronic development of ‘associated motion’ in Mparntwe Arrernte. Buffalo Papers in Linguistics 1: 207–57.
