= Situ language =

Rgyalrong language of Sichuan, China

Situ
- Eastern rGyalrong
- Native to: China
- Region: Sichuan
- Language family: Sino-Tibetan: Tibeto-Burman; Qiangic; Gyalrongic; Gyalrong; Situ

Language codes
- ISO 639-3: (included in Jiarong [jya])
- Glottolog: situ1238

Situ (Chinese: 四土话; pinyin: Sìtǔhuà) is a Rgyalrong language spoken in Sichuan, China. The name "Situ", literally "four Tusi", comes from a historical name of the Ma'erkang region.

== Distribution ==
Gates (2012: 102–103) lists the following locations where Situ is spoken. It is spoken by over 35,000–40,000 people in 57 villages.

- southern half of Ma’ěrkāng/'Bar-kams County (53 villages)
  - Zhuókèjī, Mǎ’ěrkāng/'Bar-kams, and Sōnggǎng/rDzong-'gag Towns, including surrounding villages
  - Sūomò/Somang and Báiwān/Brag-bar Townships
  - Báiwān/Brag-bar and Dǎngbà/Dam-pa Townships
- Jīnchuān/Chu-chen County (4 villages)
  - Jímù/Kye-mo Township (although Nilong Village primarily has Lavrung speakers)
  - possibly also Kǎlājiǎo and Sāwǎjiǎo Townships
- northwestern Li County, Sichuan
- southernmost Hóngyuán County (recent migrants)

== Dialects ==
Gates (2012: 103) lists 7 dialects of Situ.

- Jiaomuzu Township 脚木足乡, western Barkam County
- Jimu Township 集木乡, Jinchuan County
- Dangba Township 党坝乡, southwestern Barkam County
- Bawang-Songgang Townships 巴旺乡-松岗镇, west-central Barkam County
- Ben Town 本镇, central Barkam County
- Zhuokeji Town 卓克基镇, central Barkam County
- Suomo Township 梭磨乡, eastern Barkam County

== Phonology ==
Consonants of Brag-dbar Situ
		Labial	Alveolar		Retroflex	Alveolo- palatal	Palatal	Velar/ Uvular
		Labial	plain	sibilant	Retroflex	Alveolo- palatal	Palatal	Velar/ Uvular
Nasal		m	n				ɲ	ŋ
Plosive/ Affricate	voiceless	p	t	t͡s	t͡ʂ	t͡ɕ	c	k
Plosive/ Affricate	aspirated	pʰ	tʰ	t͡sʰ	t͡ʂʰ	t͡ɕʰ	cʰ	kʰ
Plosive/ Affricate	voiced	b	d	d͡z		d͡ʑ	ɟ	ɡ
Plosive/ Affricate	prenasalized	ᵐb	ⁿd	ⁿd͡z	ⁿd͡ʐ	ⁿd͡ʑ	ᶮɟ	ᵑɡ
Fricative	voiceless	(f)		s		ɕ		χ
Fricative	voiced	v		z		ʑ		
Lateral			l					
Sonorant		w	r				j	

- /v/ can be realized as its voiceless equivalent [f], before a voiceless consonant. /v/ is heard as [v] in middle position, and may also be heard as a bilabial fricative [β], in free variation.
- [f] can appear in Chinese loans, and can also be heard as a voiceless bilabial fricative [ɸ].
- /r/ can be heard as a voiceless retroflex [ʂ] before a voiceless consonant. /r/ is heard as [r] in middle position and can also be heard as a voiced retroflex [ʐ] in free variation.

Vowels
	Front	Central	Back
Close	i		u
Mid	e	ə	o
Near-open	iɛ	ɐ	
Open	iɛ	a	

- The diphthong /iɛ/ can be heard as more open-front [ia], after being followed by a velar consonant.
- /ɐ/ can be heard as a front-mid [ɛ], when between a front and central vowel, or between a back and central vowel.
- The distinction between the central grade (front and back vowels) and the non-central grade is fundamental in the vowel system of the brag-bar.

== Grammar ==
=== Verbal agreement ===
Data adapted from Lin (1993). Columns indicate the patient, and rows the agent. For example, the item tə-no-n in row "2sg" and column "3" means "you(singular) drive him/her/it/them.two/them".

		patient						
		1SG	1DU	1PL	2SG	2DU	2PL	3
agent	1SG				ta-no	ta-no-ntʃ	ta-no-ɲ	no-ŋ
agent	1DU				ta-no	ta-no-ntʃ	ta-no-ɲ	no-tʃ
agent	1PL				ta-no	ta-no-ntʃ	ta-no-ɲ	no-i
agent	2SG	kə-w-no-ŋ	kə-w-no-tʃ	kə-w-no-i				tə-no-n
agent	2DU	kə-w-no-ŋ	kə-w-no-tʃ	kə-w-no-i				tə-no-ntʃ
agent	2PL	kə-w-no-ŋ	kə-w-no-tʃ	kə-w-no-i				tə-no-ɲ
agent	3SG	wə-no-ŋ	wə-no-tʃ	wə-no-i	tə-w-no	tə-w-no-ntʃ	tə-w-no-ɲ	no-u
agent	3DU	wə-no-ŋ	wə-no-tʃ	wə-no-i	tə-w-no	tə-w-no-ntʃ	tə-w-no-ɲ	no-ntʃ
agent	3PL	wə-no-ŋ	wə-no-tʃ	wə-no-i	tə-w-no	tə-w-no-ntʃ	tə-w-no-ɲ	no-ɲ

=== Stem alternation ===
Some Situ dialects have rich stem changes. For example, stem alternations is quasi-ubiquitous in Brag-bar, observed in both inflectional and derivational morphology.

==== Inflectional stem changes ====
Inflectional stem alternations in Brag-bar occur in different TAME and argument indexation categories. Generally speaking, stem I is used in most non-past categories as well as inferential past, and stem II in non-inferential past and egophoric present contexts. In most cases, stem II is derived from stem I by tonal inversion between a high and falling tones, sometimes with vowel alternations between the central grade (ə, ɐ, a) and non-central grade (i/u, e/o, iɛ).

Verbs with particular syllable structures distinguish stem I’ or stem II’, sensitive to phonological environment. Verbs with an open syllable and a high tone, as well as those with a closed syllable ending in a stop, distinguish stem I’ from stem I, occurring in non-suffixing non-past and inferential forms; verbs with an open syllable and a falling tone may distinguish stem II’ from stem II in non-suffixing non-inferential past and egophoric present forms. Stem I’ and stem II’ are formed by a unidirectional vowel shift to the non-central grade.

Inflectional stem alternations in Brag-bar
Citation form	Stem I-suffix	Stem I’-ø	Stem II-suffix	Stem II’-ø
ka-phô 'to flee'	phô		phó	
ka-lát 'to release'	lát		liɛ̂t	
ka-siɛ́t 'to kill'	sát	siɛ́t	siɛ̂t	
ka-viɛ̂ 'to do'	viɛ̂		vá	viɛ́

==== Derivational stem changes ====
Stem changes are also observed in Brag-bar derivational morphology, governed by a unidirectional tonal alternation rule, either to a high or to falling tone. Tonal alternations are often accompanied with vowel changes, of which the direction is likely to be correlated with the verb stem’s syllable structure. For open syllable verb stems, alternations to high tone happens with vowel shift to the non-central grade, whereas that to falling tone co-exists with vowel shift to the central grade.

- ka-viɛ̂ 'to do' → oblique participle sa-vâ
- ka-viɛ̂ 'to do' → autobenefactive verb ka-nə-viɛ́ 'to do (for oneself)'
- ka-thɐ̂ 'to go upward' → applicative verb ka-thót 'to take upward'
- ka-ɟə̂ 'to go downward' → applicative verb ka-ɟút 'to take downward'

== Kinship terminology ==
Zhang and Fan (2020) show that the Brag-bar terminology preserves indirect traces of the Omaha kinship terminology, characterized by a cross-parallel distinction and skewing rules. Omaha skewing is directly observed in the Japhug terminology and might once have existed in Tangut.
