= Direct voice =

Direct voice may refer to:

- Direct–inverse alignment, a proposed concept in linguistic typology
- Direct voice mediumship, the hypothesis that spirits speak independently of the medium, who facilitates the phenomenon rather than produces it
