= Massachusett grammar =

The Massachusett language shared several features in common with other Algonquian languages. Nouns have gender based on animacy, often considered to reflect the traditional worldview of the speakers on what has spirit versus what does not (e.g. a body would be animate, but the parts of the body are inanimate). Nouns are also marked for obviation, with nouns less relevant to the discourse marked apart from nouns that are more so. Personal pronouns distinguish three persons, two numbers (singular and plural), inclusive and exclusive first-person plural, and proximate and obviative third-persons. Nouns are also marked as absentative, especially when referring to lost items or deceased persons.

Sentence structures are typically SVO or SOV, but deviation from strict word order is possible due to the synthetic structure. Verbs are quite complex, and can be broken into four classes of verbs: animate-intransitive (AI), inanimate-intransitive (II), animate-transitive (AT), and inanimate-transitive (IT), depending on the animacy of the subject (for intransitive verbs) or object (for transitive ones). Verbs can also be supplied with various other prefixes and suffixes, so complex things can easily be described just by a verb.

== Person ==
	Animate		Inanimate	
Proximate	Singular	Plural	Singular	Plural
Proximate	1, 'I,' 'me'	1p, 'we' (exclusive)	0, 'it'	0p, 'they'
Proximate		12, 'we' (inclusive)	0, 'it'	0p, 'they'
Proximate	2, 'thou/you'	2p, 'you'	0, 'it'	0p, 'they'
Proximate	3, 'he/she/it'	3p, 'they'	0, 'it'	0p, 'they'
Proximate	X, 'someone/somebody'		0, 'it'	0p, 'they'
Obviate	3", 'he/she/it'	3", 'they'		
Prox. of obv.	3, 'he/she/it'	3p, 'they'		

Massachusett recognizes first, second and third person in singular and plural form. However, like other Algonquian languages, Massachusett makes a distinction between the first person plural exclusive, 'we, excluding you' and the first person plural inclusive, 'we, including you.' In general, the exclusive is more common when referring to oneself and one's family and network or when the audience is unknown, but the inclusive is used when the audience is definitely being referenced.

The obviate, a form of 'second third person' that disambiguates the activities of another third person in a sentence, may possess another noun which although technically a 'third third person,' has no forms that distinguish it from the unmarked proximate bare form of a noun, as opposed to more conservative languages like Ojibwe which have a separate form for nouns in this rare position. Similarly, there are no attested forms for obviate inanimate nouns, as exist in Ojibwe.

Persons exist on an importance scale, which is often more important in establishing word order regarding synthetic placement of prefixes, suffixes and markers. For example, most words exist which generally follow a hierarchy of 2 > 1 > X > 3 > 3'.

== Nouns ==
Person	Prefix	Stem	Central	Infix	Peripheral	Plural			or	Absentative		Locative	Obviative
Person	Prefix	Stem	Central	Infix	Diminutive	Animate	or	Inanimate	or	Singular	Plural	Locative	Obviative
1	(nu-)				(-ees) (-amees)	(-ak)	or	(-ash)	or	(-ay)	(-uk)	(-ut) (-uk)	(-ah)
2	(ku-)				(-ees) (-amees)	(-ak)	or	(-ash)	or	(-ay)	(-uk)	(-ut) (-uk)	(-ah)
3	(wu-) (u-)				(-ees) (-amees)	(-ak)	or	(-ash)	or	(-ay)	(-uk)	(-ut) (-uk)	(-ah)
1p	(nu-)		(-un)	(-ôn-)	(-ees) (-amees)	(-ak)	or	(-ash)	or	(-ay)	(-uk)	(-ut) (-uk)	(-ah)
12	(ku-)		(-un)	(-ôn-)	(-ees) (-amees)	(-ak)	or	(-ash)	or	(-ay)	(-uk)	(-ut) (-uk)	(-ah)
2p	(ku-)		(-uw)	(-ôw-)	(-ees) (-amees)	(-ak)	or	(-ash)	or	(-ay)	(-uk)	(-ut) (-uk)	(-ah)
3p	(wu-) (u-)		(-uw)	(-ôw-)	(-ees) (-amees)	(-ak)	or	(-ash)	or	(-ay)	(-uk)	(-ut) (-uk)	(-ah)
X	(mu-)				(-ees) (-amees)	(-ak)	or	(-ash)	or	(-ay)	(-uk)	(-ut) (-uk)	(-ah)

- (wu-) before /k/, /m/, /p/ or /w/ alters to (u-) /ə/.

Nouns can only have an animate/inanimate plural or absentative animate/inanimate singular or plural terminations on a given word. In general, the locative is the same in the singular and plural and replaces the animate/inanimate plural if any. All nouns can have a diminutive, locative and obviative ending, although it would be rare for a word to exist with all possible forms, the order is usually diminutive, absentative/animate-inanimate plural (if any), locative, obviative. For example, *wekeesiutoh *(weekeesayutah), literally 'his-house-diminutive-absentative-locative-obviate' which would signify 'at the other man's/woman's small house—that is no more? that was destroyed?'

=== Number ===
Algonquian languages recognize two numbers, singular and plural. Although it is rare for a word to not have both a singular and plural form, a small number of nouns, as in English, are either uncountable or inherently plural or singular. This is clearest in loan words from English such as monêash (moneyash), from English 'moneys,' which always appears in the plural and saut (salt), from English 'salt' which only appears in the singular.

Nouns are unmarked in the singular, but can take one of two forms dependent on the noun's gender, which can be either animate and refer to something considered living, moving, divine or said to have spirit and inanimate including natural objects, tools and small plants. Words that are animate have -ack/-og/-ak (-ak) /-ak/ and those that are inanimate have -ash/-osh (-ash) /-aʃ/ appended to the end, respectively. Although unmarked in the singular, words must have either an animate or inanimate plural, with only a few rare exceptions to this rule.

Nouns in the singular often exist in a truncated form, but when any endings such as the plural are appended, many nouns will have consonants or syllables appear where unexpected, but were probably the original form of the word from its development from Proto-Algonquian. For instance, the words 'dog,' 'man' and 'chair' appear in Massachusett as annum (anum) /anəm/, wosketomp (waskeetôp) /waskiːtãp/ and appuonk (apuwôk) /apəwãk/ in the singular but anumwog (anumwak) /anəmwak/, wosketompauog (waskeetôpâak) /waskiːtãpaːak/ and appuonkanash (apuwôkanash) /apəwãkanaʃ/ as 'dogs' and 'chairs,' respectively. In the case of 'dog,' Massachusett annum (anum) developed from Proto-Algonquian *aθemwa with the final *-wa only re-appearing in the non-truncated forms of the plural, i.e., Proto-Algonquian *aθemwaki and Massachusett annumwak (anumwak). As they are based on etymology, words with these non-truncated finals must be learned individually.

=== Gender and plural formation ===
As seen in the plural formations, all nouns have a grammatical gender based on animacy, thus nouns are either animate or inanimate. Animate objects include human beings and their bodies, animals, trees and bushes, planetary bodies—essentially things considered to be alive, possess spirit or are mobile—whereas inanimate nouns cover most objects, body parts, natural land forms, abstract things—essentially objects that do not move, do not possess spirit and generally unable to move.

Numerous exceptions to this general rule exist. The body parts -ohpee (-apee), 'hip,' -úhkus (-uhkas), 'finger nail' and woskequah (wushkeeqâh) /wəʃkiːkʷaːh/, 'whale bone'; the English loan words conner (corner) and Testament (Testament) and the kitchen object kunnommaog (kunumuwôk) /kənəməwãk/, 'ladle' or 'spoon' are all animate. The sun and moon, despite being planetary bodies, are inanimate. Although standing trees are animate, names of trees and species are always inanimate, thus the plural form of kꝏwa (k8wa) /kuːwa/, 'pine tree,' is not *kꝏwak (*k8wak) but instead kꝏwash (k8wash).

Only a handful of words can appear with both genders, with subtle differences in meaning. For instance, the word for 'tree' is mehtog (muhtuq), but can also mean 'wood.' As gender is not overtly marked in the singular, this can be seen in the plural forms where mehtogquog (muhtuqak), 'trees' (that are still in the ground and living) and mehtogquosh (muhtuqash), 'trees' (that have been felled) but better translates as 'wood,' i.e., the product of a tree that is no longer living. Another rare form is to refer to land forms, structures or locales said to have a spiritual presence, or were considered the meeting place with or dwelling of tutelary spirits were discussed in the animate gender, in essence 'personifying' or linguistically 'animating' them. For example, wadchuash (wachuwash), 'mountains,' is the inanimate plural, but when it appears as *wadchuog (wachuwak) in the animate plural, it signifies 'mountains' but specifically the 'spirit(s) of the mountains.' This latter feature only appears in religious and ceremonial usage and is only known from a few examples, but was likely more common prior to the introduction of Christianity and the English missionary influences.

=== Case ===
==== Obviation ====
Massachusett, just as in other Algonquian languages, marks second third persons with an obviative marker -oh (-ah) /ah/. The proximate, usually the primary subject or more important topic is left unmarked. In English, for example, 'He gives the book to me, then I give the money to him,' it is ambiguous if the man receiving the money is the same as the giver of the book or a different man present, but in Massachusett, the person giving the book would be proximate and thus unmarked and the recipient of the money would be marked for obviation and removing the ambiguity.

The noun marked for obviation tends to be the possessed, not the possessor, and also tends to be the less animate or the recipient of a particular action. For example, mosq nâau ahtuckoh (masq nâwâw ahtuhqah) /mask naːwaːw ahtəhkʷah/, 'The bear sees the deer.' Like the word 'deer' in English, which may refer to the animal in the singular and collectively, the obviative forms are identical in the singular and the plural and have to be differentiated by context. Nouns which are truncated are restored, as with the plural endings, so anum (anum), 'dog' and plural anumwog (anumwak) and appuonk (apuwônk) and plural appuonkanash (apuwônkanash), 'chairs' become annumwoh (anumwah) /anəmwah/ and appuonkanah (apuwônkanah) /apuːãnkanah/, respectively, when marked for obviation. This can occur in verbs as well:

Proximate

Nꝏwoman kuh nꝏwamanug.
(Nuwâmôn kah nuwâmônuq.)
I-love-her.AN and me-love-she
'I love her and she loves me.'

nunnechanunnonog.
(nuneechônunônak.)
my-child-PL.EXCL-[r]en
'Our (exclusive) children'

Obviate

Nꝏwoman kuh nꝏwamanugoh.
(Nuwamôn kah nuwamônuqah.)
I-love-her.AN and me-love-she-OBV
'I love her and she loves me.' (obviative 'other she', suggesting a love triangle)

Nunnechanunnonog wunnechannooah
(Nuneechanunônak wuneechanuwôwah)
our.EXCL-child[r]-en their-child[r]-en-OBV
'Our (exclusive) children's children.' (obviative 'children of other they' distinct from 'our children')'

Proximate of obviate (third third-person)

Nunnechanunnonog wunnechannooah wunnechanuwauwog.
(Nuneechanunônak wuneechanuwôwah wuneechanuwôwak.)
our.EXCL-child[r]-en their-child[r]-en-OBV their-child[r]-en
'Our (exclusive) children's children's children.' (children of our children's children) (obviative 'children of other they' distinct from 'our children' but proximate 'their-children')

Nꝏsh ꝏshoh umisses.
(N8sh 8shah umuhsees.)
my-father his-father-OBV his-sister
'my father's father's sister.' (referring to paternal great aunt) (obviative 'his-father' but proximate 'his-sister')

==== Absentation ====
Algonquian languages mark those objects that were, i.e., people or living things that are deceased and objects that are lost, stolen or destroyed, or 'absent,' as opposed to those that currently exist. For people and animate objects, it generally refers to something alive that has passed away. Items that are destroyed, beyond repair or lost forever tend to be inanimate objects. All nouns, whether animate or inanimate, are marked with the suffixes -i or -y (-ay) /aj/ in the singular and -uk or -ug (-uk) /-ək/ in the plural. With the same forms, a noun's animacy must be known or determined from context. Truncated noun stems are also restored before absentative endings, so woskétomp (waskeetôp) /waskiːtãp/ is restored before becoming woskétompáay (waskeetôpâay) /waskiːtãpaːaj/, 'man' (that is passed away).

Animate

- kꝏshi (k8shay) /kuːʃaj/, 'your (singular) late father'
- nussontimminonuk (nusôtyumunônuk) /nəsãtjəmənãnək/, 'our (exclusive) deceased sachems'

Inanimate

- uméquonnai (umeequnay) /əmiːkʷənaj/, 'his feather' (that was lost? that was destroyed?)
- wuttuhquaunnick (wutuhqônuk) /wətəhkʷãnək/ 'her hooks' (that were lost? that were destroyed?)

==== Diminution ====
Nouns can be marked with one of two diminutive endings, -ees (-ees) /iːs/ or -emes (-âmees) /aːmiːs/, with the latter form chosen for more extreme examples or euphony. These endings indicate that the noun is smaller, littler or younger. For example, nonkomp (nôkôp) /nãkãp/, 'boy,' nonkompees (nôkôpees) /nãkãpiːs/, 'young boy' and nonkompamees (nôkôpâmees) /nãkãpaːmiːs/, a 'very young boy.' Although rare in the written language, which may have thus protected against its complete intrusion in the spoken language, late-stage speakers along the western and northern transitional dialects permitted syncope and the diminutive ending is often truncated, as seen in the surname of Crispus Attucks, Attuck[ee]s (Ahtuq[ee]s), 'Little Deer,' and wachu[ee]s (wachu[w][ee]s), 'small mountain' or 'hill' as in the example of Mount Wachusett, a Native toponym from the closely related Nipmuc-speaking peoples where syncope was generally permitted.

The use of the diminutive, as in extant Algonquian languages, may have had some semantic functions that varied between dialects. Although it is the general rule to use diminutive endings on small, young and little things, examples from other Algonquian languages such as Ojibwe indicate that it can be used as a term of endearment, such as n'nechanemes (nuneechanâmees) /nəniːtʃanaːmiːs/, 'my little child,' but can also be used, in certain contexts, to mark something as inferior or degrading, such as keen wosketompees (keeen waskeetôpees) /kiːn waskiːtãpiːs/, 'you little man' but could have nuanced implied meanings of being weak, small in stature, inferior or unworthy dependent on context.

==== Location ====
Nouns are suffixed with a locative suffix -et (also -ett, -it, etc.) (-ut) to indicate 'in/on/at' (physically). It can be used to mark areas near certain geographical features, and survives in the name Massachusett (Mâsach8sut) /maːsatʃuːsət/ as well as most geographical place names and landmarks of Massachusett-language derivation. The locative is often, though not always, identical in singular and the plural and number has to be determined from context.

The choice of locative seems to have some dialectal variation, where the older form -uck/-og/-uk (-uk) was generally more common in the speech of Nantucket and areas inhabited by the Nauset, and seems to have occurred with equal frequency in the related L-dialect Nipmuc language and areas inhabited by the Pawtucket. Areas inhabited by the Coweset, Massachusett and the closely related Y-dialect Narragansett seem to have been strongholds of the /-ət/ termination, although documents in Natick seem to have also used the /-ək/ variant, perhaps due to the influence of Nipmuc. As the written language of Eliot seems to have favored /-ət/, most place names in the region in Massachusetts were 'standardized' under the influence of the literate Indians and the English missionaries.

There is a rare secondary locative -ehtu (-eehtyuw) /iːhtʲᵊəw/ or -uhkontu (-uhkôhtyuw) that only appears in a handful of attestations in the Native documents. It seems to have been somewhat more common in Eliot's translation of the Bible, where it seems to serve the purpose of a plural locative. For example, ayeuwogut, 'in/on/at the place,' and nuppeeit, 'in/on/at the water' and ayeuonganehtu (ayuwôkaneehtyuw), 'in/on/at the places,' and nippekontu (nupeehkôhtyuw) /nəpiːhkãtjəw/, 'in/on/at the waters.

The locative can be used for abstract phrases, such as 'in his posterity' and 'on this day' and these phrases can be literally translated from English. The locative, however, is also mandatory for certain transitive verbs that do not have an English parallel.

Nupponam usquont neekitt
(Nup8num usqôt neekut)
/nəpuːnəm əskʷãt niːkət/
I-put-it door my-house-LOC
'I place a door on my house.'

dialectal neekuck (neekuk) /niːkək/

N'taumam kumishꝏnit
(Nutômôm kumuhsh8nut)
/nətãmãm kəməhʃuːnət/
I-fish you-canoe-LOC
'I am fishing in your canoe.'

dialectal kumishꝏnucke (kumuhsh8nuk) /kəməuhʃuːnək/

yeu kesukod
(y8 keesukut)
/juː kiːsəkət/
this day-LOC
'On this day'

dialectal keesukok (keesukuk) /kiːsəkək/

'We (inclusive) go to the sachem's village'

- kutóminn sonchim ꝏtannit (kutômun sôtyum wut8tanut) /kətãmən sãtjəm wətuːtanət/
- dialectal ꝏtannuk (wut8tanuk) /wətuːtanək/
- Literally 'his-village-in' (locative 'in/on/at his village')
- In this case, the locative is used in directional verbs to mean 'to' as in 'towards the ....'

nutoqueneoquiss nꝏshutt
(nutaquneôqus n8shut)
/nətakʷənjᵊãkʷəs nuːʃət/
I-resemble my-father-LOC
'I resemble my father.'

dialectal nꝏshick (n8shuk)

=== Genitive ===
Animate	Person	Stem	Central	Infix	Peripheral (plural)	Complete form
Animate	1, (nu-)	(-8hkas) Noun dependent Vowel initial			(-ak)	(n8hkas), 'my mother' (n8hkasak), 'my mothers'
Animate	2, (ku-)	(-8hkas) Noun dependent Vowel initial			(-ak)	(k8hkas), 'your (sing.) mother' (k8hkasak), 'your (sing.) mothers'
Animate	3, (wu-)	(-8hkas) Noun dependent Vowel initial			(-ak)	(8hkas), 'his/her/its mother' (8hasak), 'his/her/its mothers'
Animate	1p, (nu-)	(-8hkas) Noun dependent Vowel initial	(-un)	(-ôn-)	(-ak)	(n8hkasun), 'our (excl.) mother' (n8hkasunônak), 'our (excl.) mothers'
Animate	12, (ku-)	(-8hkas) Noun dependent Vowel initial	(-un)	(-ôn-)	(-ak)	(k8hkasun), 'our (incl.) mother' (k8hkasunônak), 'our (incl.) mothers'
Animate	2p, (ku-)	(-8hkas) Noun dependent Vowel initial	(-uw)	(-ôw-)	(-ak)	(k8hkasuwôwak), 'your (pl.) mother' (k8hkasuwôwak), 'your (pl.) mothers'
Animate	3p, (wu-)	(-8hkas) Noun dependent Vowel initial	(-uw)	(-ôw-)	(-ak)	(8hkasuwôwak), 'your (pl.) mother' (k8hkasuwôwak), 'your (pl.) mothers'
Animate	X, (mu-)	(-8hkas) Noun dependent Vowel initial				(m8hkas), 'someone's mother'
Inanimate	1, (nu-)	(apuwôk[an]) Noun independent Vowel-initial; Intrusive 't' Truncated stem			(-ash)	(nutapuwôk), 'my chair' (nutapuwôkanash), 'my chairs'
Inanimate	2, (ku-)	(apuwôk[an]) Noun independent Vowel-initial; Intrusive 't' Truncated stem			(-ash)	(kutapuwôk), 'your (sing.) chair' (kutapuwôkanash), 'your (sing.) chairs'
Inanimate	3, (wu-)	(apuwôk[an]) Noun independent Vowel-initial; Intrusive 't' Truncated stem			(-ash)	(wutapuwôk), 'his/her/its chair' (wutapuwôkanash), 'his/her/its chairs'
Inanimate	1p, (nu-)	(apuwôk[an]) Noun independent Vowel-initial; Intrusive 't' Truncated stem	(-un)	(-ôn-)	(-ash)	(nutapuwôkanun), 'our (excl.) chair' (nutapuwôkanunônash), 'our (excl.) chairs'
Inanimate	12, (ku-)	(apuwôk[an]) Noun independent Vowel-initial; Intrusive 't' Truncated stem	(-un)	(-ôn-)	(-ash)	(kutapuwôkanun), 'our (incl.) chair' (kutapuwôkanunônash), 'our (incl.) chairs'
Inanimate	2p, (ku-)	(apuwôk[an]) Noun independent Vowel-initial; Intrusive 't' Truncated stem	(-uw)	(-ôw-)	(-ash)	(kutapuwôkanuw), 'our (incl.) chair' (kutapuwôkanuwôwash), 'our (incl.) chairs'
Inanimate	3p, (wu-)	(apuwôk[an]) Noun independent Vowel-initial; Intrusive 't' Truncated stem	(-uw)	(-ôw-)	(-ash)	(wutapuwôkanuw), 'their chair' (wutapuwôkanuwôwash), 'their chairs'
Inanimate	X, (mu-)	(apuwôk[an]) Noun independent Vowel-initial; Intrusive 't' Truncated stem				(mutapuwôk), 'someone's chair'

The prefixes, suffixes and infixes on nouns shown in the table under nouns determine ownership are used as genitive constructions, equivalent to 'my,' 'our,' 'ours,' 'his,' 'her,' 'hers,' 'its', 'their,' 'theirs' used in English. As previously states, the third-person form wu- (wu-) is truncated to u- (u-) or, with sufficient context, sometimes dropped altogether in certain situations, so meequon (meeqôn) is umeequon (umeeqôn) and never *wumeequon (*wumeeqôn). Both of the first-person plural forms have an ending (-un), which are otherwise distinguished by (nu-), equivalent to 'I'.

Plural persons are formed with suffixes. For example, 'our' can be formed with nu-[stem]-un, 'I-[stem]-first-person plural' in the exclusive form or ku-[stem]-un, 'you-[stem]-[1st pl.] in the inclusive form. The inclusive form actually shares ku-, the second-person prefix, as the construction 'you-[stem]-[1st pl.],' somewhat suggesting 'you + us' as it would naturally include the audience or person being addressed in a description of a group action including the speaker. The second-person plural and third-person plural are formed with (ku-) and (wu-) or its variant (u-)—used before /m/, /p/, /k/ or /w/, but not /kʷ/—respectively. They also share use of the second/third-person plural suffix (-uw).

Plural personhood in the dependency markers requires an infix, which wedges itself between the suffix appended to the stem and the peripheral markers, such as those that indicate the animate or inanimate plural, depending on the word's gender or absentative, locative or obviative forms. The first-person exclusive and first-person inclusive plurals share (-ôn-) whilst the second- and third-person plurals share (-ôw-). This prevents the previous stem from truncation or elimination, according to the complicated sound rules for joining morphemes and the influence of surrounding vowels. Thus, 'our (exclusive) feet' is (nuseetunônash) and not (*nuseetunash) and 'your (plural) feet' is (kuseetuwôwash) and not (*kuseetuwash).

=== Dependent and Independent nouns ===
Nouns are declined by person somewhat differently depending on whether or not the noun in question is dependent or independent. For example, a 'foot' always belongs to someone and therefore, in Algonquian languages, it can only exist in a genitive construction such as 'my foot,' 'your feet,' 'his foot,' etc., and is therefore 'dependent.' When the exact owner is unknown, (mu-) is attached and indicates 'someone's' or 'somebody's' foot. Dependency is a common feature of kinship terms such as 'mother' or 'father,' almost all body parts, including the body itself. Most other nouns are independent and can exist by themselves, although they can also be declined in genitive constructions, such as a 'tree' can be owned as 'my tree' or 'his tree' that do exist without implied ownership.

==== Intrusive 't' ====
As a grammatical rule, a /t/ is inserted before the prefix that implies the person and an independent noun stem that begins with a vowel. For example, nutohkeem (nutahkeem), 'my land' where ohke (ahkee), 'earth' or 'land' is independent. This is in contrast to nꝏsh (n8sh), 'my father,' which does not require the 'intrusive t' as it is a dependent noun, i.e., not *nutꝏsh (*nut8sh) which are incorrect.

The example of 'my father' also shows that vowel-initial dependent noun roots assimilate the vowel of the person prefix, nꝏsh (n8sh) not *nuꝏsh (*nu8sh). When a dependent noun has ownership that is not implied or unknown, the Algonquian X person, it is prefixed with mu- which indicates that it is 'someone's' or 'somebody's,' for instance, musseett (museet) /məsiːt/, 'someone's foot' or 'somebody's foot.' Dependent nouns that begin with a consonant do not assimilate the preceding vowel, e.g., kunnutcheg (kunucheek) /kənətʃiːk/, 'your (singular) hand.' Dependent nouns have to be learned separately.

==== M-class ====
A small 'm-class' of independent nouns also exist. This small subset of words takes a final (-m) in words that end in a vowel or (-um) for words that end in a consonant, but only when the word is declined for person. This terminal is dropped when the noun exists in its, non-pronominally declined independent form. This was likely a retention of an archaic trait in the language that began to fade from the language around the time literacy was adopted, as the Indian documents show that many writers applied it inconsistently and seem to have been unsure, although it is just as likely that it may have varied by dialect or age of speaker. Where it was retained, the /m/ helps preserve noun stems from mutation or assimilation of vowels of various noun suffixes.

wadchu (wachuw) /watʃəw/ 'mountain'

- nuwadchumash (nuwachuwumash) /nəwatʃəwəmaʃ/ 'my mountains'
- wadchuwash (wachuwash) 'mountains'

ohke (ahkee) /ahkiː/ 'land'

- nutohkemi (nutahkeemay) 'my former land'
- ohkeash (ahkeeash), 'lands.'

kehtassꝏt (keehtahs8t) /kiːhtahsuːt/ 'king'

- kukehtassꝏtam (kukeehtas8tum) /kəkiːhtahsuːtəm/ 'your king'
- kehtassꝏtak (keehtahs8tak), 'kings'

=== Pronouns ===
==== Independent personal pronouns ====
Person	English	Colonial	Modern	Pronunciation
1	'I,' 'me'	neen, nén	(neen)	/niːn/
2	'you' (sing), 'thou'	keen, kén	(keen)	/kiːn/
3	'he,' 'she' or 'it'	nâgum	(nâkum)	/naːkəm/
1p	'we' (exclusive)	neenawun, nenáuwin	(neenawun)	/niːnawən/
12	'we' (inclusive)	keenawun, kenauwin	(keenawun)	/kiːnawən/
2p	'you' (plural), 'ye'	keenaw	(keenaw)	/kiːnaw/
3p	'they'	nagumaw	(nâkumaw)	/naːkəmaw/

The Algonquian languages are pro-drop languages which means that independent pronouns are usually unnecessary in conversation. Nouns can be inflected for possession and verbs often encode the subject, and sometimes, even the object information, rendering the use of pronouns mostly redundant. There are several instances where pronouns cannot be omitted. For instance, Massachusett lacks a copula which is found in English as the various conjugations of the verb 'to be' that link the subject and predicate. Thus, a pronoun would be mandatory in sentences such as kén nétop (keen neetôp) /kiːn niːtãp/, 'you are my friend,' but literally 'you my-friend. The pronouns are also mandatory as the direct answers to questions involving figuring out who was doing what or what was done to whom.

In a sentence such as nuwoman (nuwâmôn), the transitive animate verb woman (wâmôn) is marked with the first-person prefix (nu-) marks the subject. The third-person recipient, 'her' or 'him' is assumed because it is an animate verb. Even though, nen nuwoman nagum or neen nagum nuwoman are possible, literally 'I I-love-[her/him] her/him' and 'I he/she I-love-[her/him],' respectively, enough information exists in the verb alone to warrant the exclusion of the pronouns.

Although the exact roles that the pronouns filled are not fully understood, in related Algonquian languages, pronouns seem to help clear ambiguity, such as the similarity of certain verb forms and noun stems, some of which may differ by only a short syllable at the end, such as (kuseet) 'your (singular) foot,' (kuseetun) 'our (inclusive) foot' and (kuseetuw), which in rapid conversation, may require the independent pronouns (keen) 'you (singular)', (keenawun) 'we (inclusive)' and (keenaw) 'you (plural)' to disambiguate. In other cases, the insertion of pronouns were probably used for emphasis, such as a topical marker, or to mark deference as is done in other Algonquian languages.

Emphasis
The pronoun helps mark the topic and the emphasis of the statement. More important in the following example is not the canoe itself but the ownership of the canoe by the owner.

Numishꝏn. Numishꝏn neen.
(Numuhsh8n. Numuhsh8n neen.)
My-canoe. My-canoe I.
'My canoe. My canoe is mine'

Deference
Possibly used to mark the noun (sôtyum), 'chief' or 'leader,' as someone worthy of respect or importance.

Kusontimman naum sépu. Nâgum kusontimman naum sépu.
(Kusôtyumun nâm seepuw. Nâkum kusôtyumun nâm seepuw.)
[He] sees river. He our-sachem-INCL he-sees river
'Our sachem (inclusive) sees the river. He, our (inclusive) sachem, sees the river.'

Disambiguation
Although the difference between 'your father' and 'our (inclusive) fathers' (obviative) is slight,

Kꝏsh matta kꝏshunocke. Keen kꝏsh matta kꝏshunog.
(K8sh mata k8shunak. Keen k8sh mata keenawun k8shunakah.)
Your-father not our-father-s. You your-father not our-father-INCL-s-OBV
'Your father not our (inclusive) fathers. You, your father, not our (inclusive) fathers.' (not all of our (inclusive) fathers, only yours alone)

==== Reflexive pronouns ====
Person	English	Colonial	Modern	Pronunciation
1	'myself'	nohhog	(nuhak)	/nəhak/
2	'yourself'	kohhog	(kuhak)	/kəhak/
3	'himself', 'herself' 'itself'	wohhog	(wuhak)	/wəhak/
12	'ourselves' (exclusive)	*nohhoggan	*(nuhakun)	*/nəhakən/
1p	'ourselves' (inclusive)	*kohhoggan	*(kuhakun)	*/kəhakən/
2p	'yourselves'	*kohhoggu	*(kuhakuw)	*/kəhakəw/
3p	'themselves'	*wohhoggu	*(wuhakuw)	*/wəhakəw/

- Only singular forms are attested in the Massachusett-language documents, but evidence from related languages suggest they may have occurred in the language, but this is uncertain.

Reflexive pronouns are relatively uncommon. Their only use appears with certain transitive animate verbs where the subject is also the recipient of the action. This is in stark contrast to languages such as Spanish or French, where reflexive verbs, and their accompanying reflexive pronoun markers, are quite common, often imbued with slightly different shades of meaning from their original non-reflexive counterparts.

In Massachusett, reflexive pronouns are only known in singular form, but plural forms are attested in closely related language. For instance, in the Loup language of Nipmuc refugees in New France, nahakanon, 'ourselves' (first person exclusive plural reflexive) appears in Mathevet's word lists recorded in the mid-eighteenth century. if it existed in Massachusett would probably appear as *nuhhoggan (*nuhakun) /*nəhakən/ as Massachusett usually dropped the infix -on unless further suffixation as required but retained in Nipmuc which corresponds to Massachusett (-ôn), e.g., (nuseetun), 'our (exclusive) foot' and (nuseetunônash), 'our (exclusive) feet.'

Wussusséquin wuhhog
(Wususeequn wuhak)
/wəsəsiːkʷən wəhak/
he-anoints his-self
'He anoints himself.'

Nꝏwoman nuhhog
(Nuwâmôn nuhak)
/nəwaːmãn nəhak/
I-love my-self
'I love myself.'

==== Demonstrative pronouns ====
	Animate						Inanimate					
	Singular			Plural			Singular			Plural		
Near deictic	yeuoh (y8uh)	/juːəh/	this	yeug (y8k)	/juːk/	these	yeu (y8)	/juː/	this	yeush (y8sh)	/juːʃ/	these
Further deictic	(nah)	/nah/	that	(neek)	/niːk/	those	(nee)	/niː/	that	(neesh)	/niːʃ/	those
Anaphoric	unne (uneeh) or neh (neeh)	/əniːh/, /niːh/	this, that	(ukanah)	/əkanah/	these, those	(y8nuh)	/juːnəh/	this, that	(shanuh)	/ʃanəh/	these, those
Interrogative	howan (hawân)	/hawaːn/	who, whom	howan (hawanak)	/hawaːnak/	who, whom (plural)	teague (tyaqa)	/tjakʷa/	what	teaguesh (tyaqash)	/tjakʷaʃ/	what (plural)

The deictic pronouns are used to express both specific objects and their physical distance in relation to the speaker, with the nearer deictic pronouns corresponding to English 'this' and plural 'these.' Objects that are too far for a speaker to use nearer deictic forms, such as objects 'over there' or 'yonder,' the farther deictic forms 'that' and 'those.'

The anaphoric pronouns were unknown to most dialects and is peculiar to the speech of Martha's Vineyard and Nantucket, but has been adopted as integral pronouns in the revived language. Their usage on the islands had two main uses. In some cases, they seem to represent 'furthest deictic,' roughly 'that'/'those' (over there) akin to the Spanish distinction between ese, 'that' and aquel, 'that yonder.' It also served in its anaphoric usage to reference 'this' or 'that' when the context was known and discussed earlier in conversation or in a written document. The anaphoric forms have obviate markings. As inanimate obviate marking is not used in Massachusett, the inanimate anaphoric forms (y8nuh) and (shanuh) perhaps have them by analogy to their animate counterparts.

The interrogative pronouns function as question words, such as 'who?', 'whom?' and 'what?' The interreogative pronouns in statements take different meanings, for instance teague (tyaqa) generally means 'what?' or 'what thing?' but also functions as 'something' as in howan (hawân) can, in non-interrogative functions, as 'somebody' or 'someone.'

=== Nominalization of verbs ===
As verbs are the basic and most important part of Massachusett word construction, nouns are often formed from verbs or can exist in verbal form, for example 'I am the chief' can be rendered with only nouns, and in an archaic style befitting a leader, sachem neen (sôtyum neen), literally sachem I,' or only with a verb as in nusontimauw (nusôtyumâw), literally 'I-chief-[animate intransitive verb]' or 'I-chief-be.' Although use of nominal versus verbal constructions were used interchangeably, they undoubtedly had distinct nuances in use that are unknown.

Conversion of nouns from verbal stems can occur in one of three ways. Nouns tend to be either the bare form of a verb, identical to the verbal form or modified with a nominalizing suffix.

Bare verb stem

mꝏs < mꝏsua-
(m8s) {} (m8swa-)
{'moose' or 'Eurasian elk'} {} {'to shear' or 'to trim smooth'}

nꝏht < nꝏhtau
(n8ht) {} (n8htâw)
'fire' {} {'it burns.'}

chog < chogui
(chahk) {} (chahkâyu-)
'spot' {} {'to be spotted'}

Identical to verbal form

pittu = pittu
(putyuw) {} (putyuw)
{'pitch' (pine resin)} {} {'it is pitch'}

sokunon = sokunon
(s8kunôn) {} (s8kunôn)
'rain' {} {'it rains'}

sepu = sepu
(seepuw) {} (seepuw)
'river' {} {'it spreads long.'}

Nominalized with -onk (-ôk)

chipwuttꝏnapwaonk > chipwuttꝏnapw-
(chupwut8napwaôk) {} (chupwut8napw-)
'kiss' {} {'to kiss by mouth'}

appuonk > appu-
(apuwôk) {} (apu-)
'chair' {} {'to sit'}

wussohquohwonk > {}
(wusuhqahwôk) {} (wusuhqahw-)
'book' {} {'to write' (with a tool)}

== Verbs ==
=== Verb categories ===
Verbs are very complex and form the basis of a typical word. Like nouns, verbs are divided into animate and inanimate forms which are distinct in meaning and usage. For example, chog- (chahk-), 'spot,' has different conjugations based on the animacy of the subject. An inanimate object, such as a body part, rock, leaf, man-made products, annual plants, etc., would be described as chogi (chahkây), 'it is spotted' (i.e., 'it has spots') whereas when referring to people, animals, large trees, planetary bodies, etc., it would be described as chogusu (chahkusuw), 'he/she/it is blemished' (literally, 'he/she is spotted'). As different verb endings are used to distinguish animacy, the subject or equivalent pronoun can be dropped in conversation and writing if there is sufficient context.

Transitivity is another important division. Verbs are marked differently if they take an object or not. For example, the root mꝏs- (m8hs-) implies 'envy' or 'jealousy' but and can be found as intransitive, not requiring an object, mꝏsumꝏau (m8hsumuwâw), 'he/she is jealous' (i.e., 'he/she/it is a jealous person) or transitive, requiring an object, mꝏsumꝏ (m8hsumuw), 'he/she is jealous of' and requires an object, e.g., mꝏsumꝏ sontimoh (m8hsumuw sôtyumah), 'he/she is jealous of the chief.'

Transitive and intransitive verbs differ when the object in question is animate or inanimate. For example, the root onch- (ôch-), signifies 'mend,' 'fix' or 'repair,' and appears as transitive with animate object onchheew (ôchuheew), 'he/she repairs [something]' and transitive with inanimate object onchuteaw (ôchuhteaw), 'he/she fixes (someone).' Similarly, quin- (qun-), 'long' or 'tall,' appears in the intransitive, no object, with animate subject qunôsu (qunôhsuw), 'he/she is tall,' and inanimate subject, no object, quinni (qunây), 'it is long' or 'it is tall'. Thus, verbs generally fall into one of four categories: animate subject, no object or animate intransitive (AI), animate object or transitive animate (TA), inanimate with no object or inanimate intransitive (II) and inanimate object or transitive inanimate (TI).

== Sources ==
- Fermino, J. L. D. (2000). An introduction to Wampanoag grammar. (Master's thesis, Massachusetts Institute of Technology).
- Goddard, I., and K. Bragdon. (1988). Native Writings in Massachusett. Philadelphia: American Philosophical Society. Halle, M., and A. Marantz.
- Gustafson, H. S. 2000. A Grammar of the Nipmuck Language. Master's thesis. Winnipeg, Canada: University of Manitoba.
- Macaulay, M. (2005). 'On the 2 > 1 Prominence Hierarchy of Algonquian' in LSO Working Papers in Linguistics 5: Proceedings of WIGL, 2005, 1–24.
- Pentland, David H. (2006). "Algonquian and Ritwan Languages", in Keith Brown, ed., Encyclopedia of Languages and Linguistics (2nd ed.), pp. 161–6. Amsterdam: Elsevier.
- Waasaagoneshkang (2001). Theft of Fire. Recorded in 1974 by William Jones, translated by Rand Valentine.
- Rees-Miller, J. (1996). Morphological Adaptation of English Loanwords in Algonquian. International Journal of American Linguistics, 62(2), 196–202. Retrieved 3 December 2017.
- Trumbull, J. H. (1903). Natick Dictionary.
