= Gyalrong languages =

Group of Gyalrongic languages of western Sichuan, China

Gyalrong
- East Gyalrongic
- Native to: China
- Region: Sichuan
- Native speakers: (83,000 cited 1999)
- Language family: Sino-Tibetan: Tibeto-Burman; Qiangic; Gyalrongic; Gyalrong
- Dialects: Situ; Japhug; Tshobdun; Zbu
- Writing system: Tibetan script

Language codes
- ISO 639-3: jya
- Glottolog: core1262
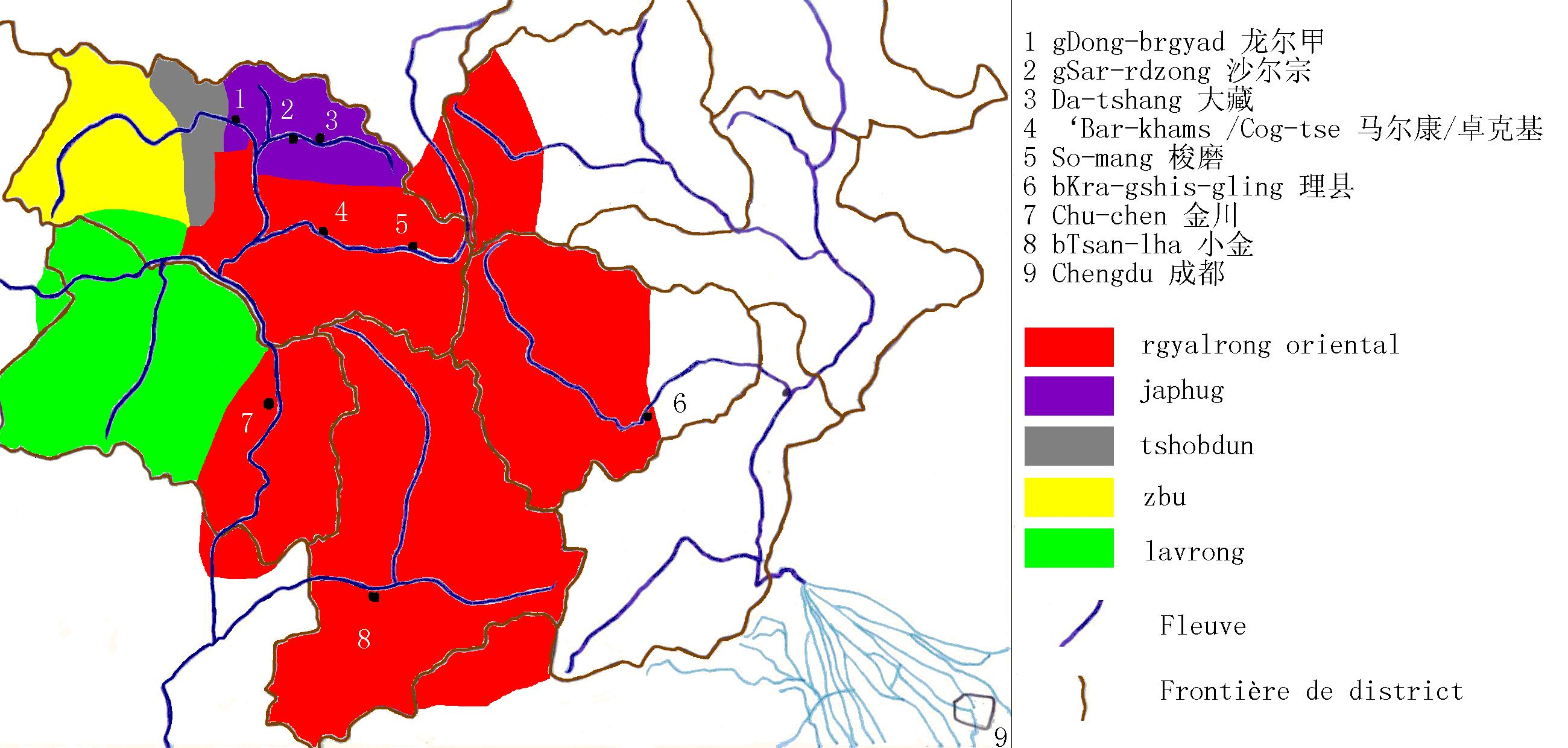
- Map of Gyalrong languages

Gyalrong or rGyalrong (Tibetan: རྒྱལ་རོང, Wylie: rgyal rong, THL: gyalrong), also rendered Jiarong (simplified Chinese: 嘉绒语; traditional Chinese: 嘉絨語; pinyin: Jiāróngyǔ), or sometimes Gyarung, is a subbranch of the Gyalrongic languages spoken by the Gyalrong people in Western Sichuan, China. Lai et al. (2020) refer to this group of languages as East Gyalrongic.

== Name ==
The name Gyalrong is an abbreviation of Tibetan ཤར་རྒྱལ་མོ་ཚ་བ་རོང, shar rgyal-mo tsha-ba rong, "the hot valleys of the queen", the queen being Mount Murdo (in Tibetan, dmu-rdo). Mount Murdo is in the historical region of Kham, now mostly located inside Ngawa Tibetan and Qiang Autonomous Prefecture in Sichuan. This Tibetan word is transcribed in Chinese as 嘉绒 or 嘉戎 or 嘉荣, jiāróng. It is pronounced [rɟɑroŋ] by speakers of Situ. It is a place-name and is not used by the people to designate their own language. The autonym is pronounced [kəru] in Situ and [kɯrɯ] in Japhug. The Gyalrong people are the descendants of former Tibetan warriors at the border, where they settled as time went by.

== Languages ==
Based on mutual intelligibility, Gates (2014) considers there to be five Gyalrong languages:

- Situ (Chinese: Situ, 四土话) or less precisely Eastern Gyalrong
- Japhug (Chinese: Chapu, 茶堡)
- Tshobdun (Chinese: Caodeng, 草登; along with Zbu, next, also called Sidaba)
- Zbu (Chinese: Ribu, 日部, also Rdzong'bur or Showu)
- Gyalrong (south-central)

Situ has more than 100,000 speakers throughout a widespread area, while the other three languages, all spoken in Barkam, have fewer than 10,000 speakers each. They are all tonal except for Japhug.

Most early studies on Gyalrong languages (Jin 1949, Nagano 1984, Lin 1993) focused on various dialects of Situ, and the three other languages were not studied in detail until the last decade of the 20th century. The differences between the four languages are presented here in a table of cognates. The data from Situ is taken from Huang and Sun 2002, the Japhug and Showu data from Jacques (2004, 2008) and the Tshobdun data from Sun (1998, 2006).

gloss	Situ	Japhug	Tshobdun	Showu
badger	pə́s	βɣɯs	ɣves	təvîs
dream	ta-rmô	tɯ-jmŋo	tɐ-jmiʔ	tɐ-lmɐʔ
I saw		pɯ-mtó-t-a	nɐ-mti-aŋ	
sheep	kəjó	qaʑo	qɐɟjiʔ	ʁiɐʔ

Gyalrong languages, unlike most Sino-Tibetan languages, are polysynthetic languages and present typologically interesting features such as inverse marking (Sun and Shi 2002, Jacques 2010), ideophones (Sun 2004, Jacques 2008), and verbal stem alternations (Sun 2000, 2004, Jacques 2004, 2008). See Situ language for an example of the latter.

== Demographics ==
Gates (2012: 102–106) lists the following demographic information for 5 rGyalrong languages. Altogether, there are about 85,000 speakers for all 5 languages combined.

Language	Speakers	Villages	Dialects	Alternate names	Locations
Situ	35,000–40,000	57	7+	rGyalrong, kəru, roŋba	almost entirely in Barkam County; NE Jinchuan County; NW Li County
rGyalrong, South-central	33,000 (out of 45,000 ethnic people)	111	3+	rGyalrong, roŋba	Xiaojin, Danba, and Baoxing Counties
Japhug	4,000–5,000	19			3 townships in NE Barkam County, namely Lóng'ěrjiǎ, Dàzàng, and Shā'ěrzōng
Tshobdun	3,000	10		stodpaskʰət	Caodeng/Tsho-bdun (WT Tshobdun) Township, Barkam County
Zbu	6,000+	28		stodpaskʰət	Barkam, Rangtang, Seda, and Aba counties

== Morphology and syntax ==
In contrast to much of Sino-Tibetan, Gyalrong languages have a complex morphology; Japhug is polysynthetic. They tend to be prefixing, with Japhug being strongly so, with nine possible slots in its prefix chain. The Gyalrong verb distinguishes singular, dual, and plural numbers. While some parts of the Gyalrong prefix template are likely quite old, at least four slots in the prefix chain have been recently innovated.

Syntactically, Gyalrong languages have SOV basic word order, and have been so for quite a while, Jacques argues. This combination of SOV word order with prefixing tendencies is typologically quite rare, although it is found also in Ket and various Athabaskan languages.
