= Cahiers de Linguistique Asie Orientale =

- Discipline: East Asian linguistics
- Language: English, French and Chinese
- Edited by: Guillaume Jacques and Thomas Pellard

Publication details
- History: 1978-present
- Publisher: Brill Publishers
- Frequency: Biannual

Standard abbreviations
- ISO 4: Cah. Linguist. Asie Orient.

Indexing
- ISSN: 0153-3320

Links
- Journal homepage

Cahiers de Linguistique Asie Orientale is a peer-reviewed academic journal of East Asian linguistics that was established in 1978 and is published by Brill. The articles published before 2007 are in free access on the Persée website.

It is indexed in Scopus.

== Topics ==
The journal publishes articles in English, French, and Mandarin Chinese, and covers a wide range of topics including generative syntax, linguistic typology, phonetics, phonology, and historical linguistics on all languages of the Sino-Tibetan, Austroasiatic, Austronesian, Hmong-Mien, Kra-Dai, Tungusic, Mongolic, and Turkic families, as well as on Japanese, Korean, and Ainu.
