= Gyalrongic languages =

Branch of the Qiangic languages of Sino-Tibetan

Gyalrongic
- Jiarongic, Rgyalrongic
- Geographic distribution: Sichuan, China
- Linguistic classification: Sino-Tibetan: Tibeto-Burman; Qiangic; Gyalrongic
- Subdivisions: West Gyalrongic; East Gyalrongic

Language codes
- Glottolog: rgya1241
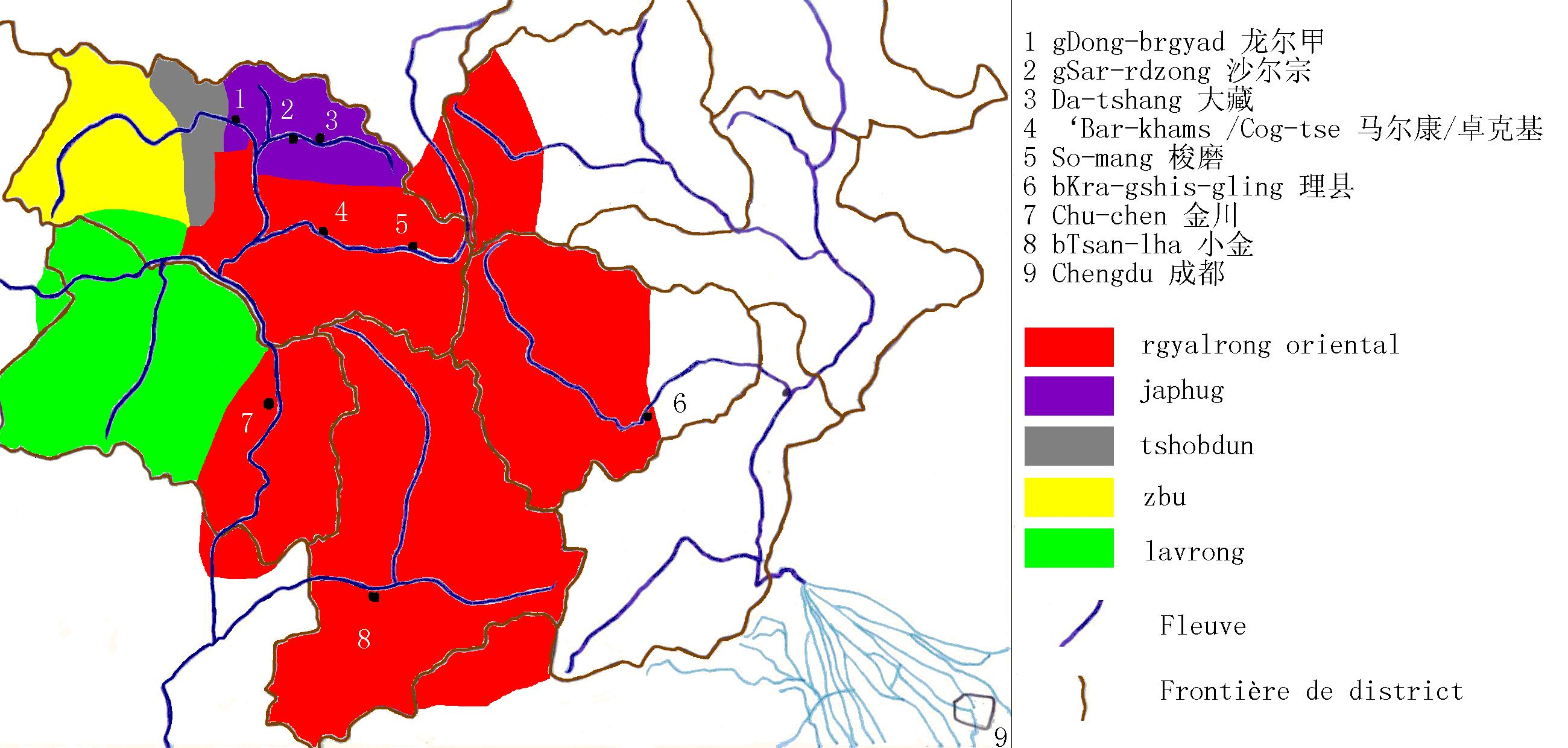

The Gyalrongic languages (also known as Rgyalrongic or Jiarongic) are a group of Sino-Tibetan languages typically classed as a branch of the Qiangic languages, but some propose that it may be part of a larger Rung languages group and do not consider it to be particularly closely related to Qiangic, instead suggesting that similarities between Gyalrongic and Qiangic may be from areal influence. However, other work suggests that Qiangic as a whole may in fact be paraphyletic, with the only commonalities of the supposed "branch" being shared archaisms and areal features that were encouraged by language contact. Jacques & Michaud (2011) propose that Qiangic including Gyalrongic may belong to a larger Burmo-Qiangic group based on some lexical innovations.

== Geographical distribution ==
The Gyalrongic languages are spoken in Sichuan in China, mainly in the autonomous Tibetan and Qiang prefectures of Karmdzes and Rngaba. These languages are distinguished by their conservative morphology and their phonological archaisms, which make them valuable for historical linguistics.

The cluster of languages variously referred to as Stau, Ergong or Horpa in the literature are spoken over a large area from Ndzamthang county (in Chinese Rangtang 壤塘县) in Rngaba prefecture (Aba 阿坝州) to Rtau county (Dawu 道孚) in Dkarmdzes prefecture (Ganzi 甘孜州), in Sichuan province, China. At the moment of writing, it is still unclear how many unintelligible varieties belong to this group, but at least three must be distinguished: the language of Rtau county (referred as ‘Stau’ in this paper), the Dgebshes language (Geshizha 格什扎话) spoken in Rongbrag county (Danba 丹巴), and the Stodsde language (Shangzhai 上寨) in Ndzamthang.

Gyalrongic languages are spoken predominantly in the four counties of Ma'erkang, Li, Xiaojin, and Jinchuan in Aba Prefecture, western Sichuan. Other Gyalrongic lects are spoken in neighboring Heishui, Rangtang, Baoxing, Danba, and Daofu counties.

== Classification ==
The Gyalrongic languages share several features, notably in verbal morphology. Classifications such as Lai et al. (2020) split Gyalrongic into West and East branches. Previous classifications operated a similar distinction between Ergong (~West Gyalrongic) and Gyalrong (~East Gyalrongic).

- Gyalrongic
  - West Gyalrongic (or Ergong)
    - Khroskyabs (formerly known as Lavrung)
    - Horpa (including Tangut)
  - East Gyalrongic (or Gyalrong proper)

The Gyalrong languages in turn constitute four mutually unintelligible varieties: Eastern Gyalrong or Situ, Japhug, Tshobdun, and Zbu.

Khroskyabs and Horpa are classified by Lin (1993) as a "western dialect" of Gyalrong, along with Eastern Gyalrong and the "northwestern dialect" (Japhug, Tshobdun, and Zbu). Otherwise, the scholarly consensus deems the distance between Khroskyabs, Horpa, and the Gyalrong cluster is greater than that between the Gyalrong languages. For example, Ethnologue reports 75% lexical similarity between Situ and Japhug, 60% between Japhug and Tshobdun, but only 13% between Situ and Horpa.

Huang (2007:180) found that Horpa (Rta’u) and Gyalrong (Cogtse) share only 15.2% cognacy, with 242 cognates out of a total of 1,592 words.

The Khalong Tibetan language has a Gyalrongic substratum.

The Chamdo languages (consisting of Lamo, Larong, and Drag-yab, a group of three closely related Sino-Tibetan languages spoken in Chamdo, eastern Tibet) may or may not be Qiangic.

== Comparison with Tibetic ==
Gyalrongic languages are surrounded by Tibetic languages and have thus been in intense contact with them. However, there are many major lexical and morphological differences between them. Gyalrongic tend to use prefixes such as *kə-, *tə-, etc., while Tibetic languages use suffixes such as -pa/-ba, -ma, -po/-bo, -mo, etc. Below is a table of comparing words in bTshanlha and Japhug that do not have cognates in Classical Tibetan.

Gloss	bTshanlha	Japhug	Classical Tibetan
year	təpa		lo
brain	tərnok	tɯ-moʁ	klad pa
hail	tərmok		ser ba
milk	təlu		’o ma
leg	tame	tɤmi	rkang pa
fish	tʃhəɣjo	qa-ɟy	nya
flower	tapat		me tog, men tog
tongue	teʃme		lce
red	kəwərne	kɯ-ɣɯmi	dmar po
yellow		kɯ-qarŋe	ser (po)
sand	kəwek		bye ma
sheep	kə-jo	qa-ʑo	lug
horse	mboro	mbro	rta
