= Japhug language =

Qiangic language spoken in Sichuan, China

Japhug
- [kɯɽ͡ʐɯ skɤt]
- Pronunciation: [tɕɤpʰɯ]
- Native to: China
- Region: Sichuan
- Language family: Sino-Tibetan: Qiangic; Gyalrongic; Gyalrong; Japhug

Language codes
- ISO 639-3: (included in Jiarong [jya])
- Glottolog: japh1234
- ELP: Japhug

Japhug is a Gyalrong language spoken in Barkam County, Rngaba, Sichuan, China, in the three townships of Gdong-brgyad (Chinese: 龙尔甲; pinyin: Lóng'rjiǎ, Japhug: [ʁdɯrɟɤt]), Gsar-rdzong (Chinese: 沙尔宗; pinyin: Shā'rzōng, Japhug: [sarndzu]) and Da-tshang (Chinese: 大藏; pinyin: Dàzàng, Japhug: [tatsʰi]).

The endonym of the Japhug language is [kɯrɯ skɤt]. The name Japhug ([tɕɤpʰɯ]; Tibetan: ja phug; Chinese: 茶堡; pinyin: Chápù) refers in Japhug to the area comprising Gsar-rdzong and Da-tshang, while that of Gdong-brgyad is also known as [sɤŋu] (Jacques 2004), but speakers of Situ Gyalrong use this name to refer to the whole Japhug-speaking area.

== Phonology ==
Japhug is the only toneless Gyalrong language. It has 49 consonants and seven vowels.

=== Consonants ===
		Labial	Dental	Alveolar	Retroflex	Alveolo- palatal	Palatal	Velar	Uvular
Nasal		m	n				ɲ	ŋ	
Plosive/ Affricate	tenuis	p	t	ts	tʂ	tɕ	c	k	q
Plosive/ Affricate	aspirated	pʰ	tʰ	tsʰ	tʂʰ	tɕʰ	cʰ	kʰ	qʰ
Plosive/ Affricate	voiced	b	d	dz	dʐ	dʑ	ɟ	ɡ	
Plosive/ Affricate	prenasal	ᵐb	ⁿd	ⁿdz	ᶯɖʐ	ᶮdʑ	ᶮɟ	ᵑɡ	ᶰɢ
Continuant	voiceless	(f)	ɬ	s	ʂ	ɕ		x	χ
Continuant	voiced	w ~ β	l	z	r ~ ʐ	ʑ	j	ɣ	ʁ

- [r] and [ʐ] are allophones, more precisely, pronounced as [ɽ͡ʐ].
- /w/ has the allophones [β] and [f].
- /ʁ/ is realized as an epiglottal fricative [ʢ] in coda position or preceding another consonant.

The prenasalized consonants are analyzed as units for two reasons. First, there is a phoneme /ɴɢ/, as in /ɴɢoɕna/ "large spider", but neither /ɴ/ nor /ɢ/ exist as independent phonemes. Second, there are clusters of fricatives and prenasalized voiced stops, as in /ʑmbri/ "willow", but never clusters of fricatives and prenasalized voiceless stops.

There is a contrast between palatal plosives and velar plosive + /j/ sequences, as in /co/ "valley" vs. /kjo/ "drag". These both contrast with alveolo-palatal affricates.

There are at least 339 consonant clusters in Japhug, more than in Old Tibetan or in most Indo-European languages. Some of these clusters are typologically unusual: in addition to the previously mentioned clusters of fricatives and prenasalized stops, there are clusters where the first element is a semivowel, as in /jla/ "hybrid of a yak and a cow".

=== Vowels ===
Vowels
	Front		Central	Back	
	unr.	rnd.	Central	unr.	rnd.
Close	i	y		ɯ	u
Mid	e			ɤ	o
Open			a		

The mid-open unrounded vowels /ɤ/ and /e/ are only marginally contrastive: /ɤ/ does not occur in word- final open syllables except in unaccented clitics (like the additive nɤ), and /e/ only occurs in the last (accented) syllable of a word. They are clearly contrastive only with the coda /-t/.

Not all speakers of Kamnyu Japhug have a phoneme /y/ in the native vocabulary. Even for those speakers, it is only attested in the word ‘fish’ and the verbs derived from it. It nevertheless contrasts with /ɯ/ and /u/, as shown by the quasi-minimal pairs /qaɟy/ ‘fish’, /waɟɯ/ ‘earthquake’ and /ɟuli/ ‘flute’. Other speakers pronounce ‘fish’ with a medial /w/ as /qaɟwi/. However, [y] is found in the speech of all Japhug speakers in Chinese loanwords such as 洋芋 ⟨yángyù⟩ ‘potato’.

== Grammar ==
Jacques (2008) is a short grammar and Jacques and Chen (2010) a text collection with interlinear glosses. Other studies on morphosyntax include Jacques (2010) on direct–inverse marking, Jacques (2012a) on valency (passive, antipassive, anticausative, lability etc.), Jacques (2012b) on incorporation and Jacques (2013) on associated motion.

=== Nouns ===
==== Case marking ====
Japhug lacks case inflection. However, Japhug does have few adverbializing derivations that display functions for oblique cases, for example, the comitative kɤ́- and perlative reduplication. In noun phrases, grammatical relations are denoted by following clitics:

Case markers in Japhug
Case	Markers
Dative	ɯ-ɕki, ɯ-pʰe
Locative	zɯ, tɕu, ri
Approximate locative	-cʰu
Genitive	ɣɯ
Ergative	kɯ
Instrumental	kɯ
Comitative	cʰo, cʰondɤre, cʰonɤ
Terminative	mɤɕtʂa
Egressive	ɕaŋtaʁ, ɕaŋpa, ɕaŋlo, ɕaŋtʰi, ɕaŋkɯ, ɕaŋdi

==== Number ====
Japhug lacks grammatical number. It has two clitic number determiners, dual ni and plural ra, both do not have syntactic relationship with noun argument.

ɯ-pi ni ndʑi-sroʁ ko-ri tɕe
3SG.POSS-elder.sibling DU 3DU.POSS-life IMPERF-save LK
"He saved the life of his two brothers."

==== Demonstratives ====
Demonstratives in Japhug can be either pronominal or post-nominal.

Function	Proximal Singular	Proximal Dual	Proximal Plural	Distal Singular	Distal Dual	Distal Plural	Medial
Base form	ki	kɯni	kɯra	nɯ	nɯnɯni	nɯra	nɤki
Reduplicated	kɯki	(kɯkɯni)	kɯkɯra	nɯnɯ	nɯnɯni	nɯnɯra	–
Emphatic	ɯkɯki	(ɯkɯkɯni)	ɯkɯkɯra	ɯnɯnɯ	(ɯnɯnɯni)	ɯnɯnɯra	–

==== Noun class marking ====
Many Japhug nouns are prefixed with noun class markers, most of which are unproductive.

Class markers in Japhug
Prefix	Semantics	Example	Notes
qa-	animals, plants, tools, materials	qapri ("snake")	reduces to χ- or ʁ- in some words.
kɯ-	animals	kɯrtsɤɣ ("snow leopard")	reduces to ɣ- or x- in some words. Cognate with Tibetan g- as in གཟིག gzig ("leopard").
m-	body parts	(tɯ-)mke ("neck")	cognate with Tibetan m- as in མགོ mgo ("head")
ɕ-	body parts	(tɯ-)ɕkrɯt ("bile")	appears as ʑ- in some words. Cognate with Tibetan s- as in སྐེ ske ("neck")

=== Verbs ===
==== Overview ====
In Japhug, verbal inflection is overwhelmingly dominated by prefixes, though it does support limited suffix slots. The Japhug verb template can be described as following:

Japhug verb template
+10	+9	+8	+7	+6	+5	+4	+3	+2	+1	core	-1	-2	-3	-4
MOD/POSS	NEG	AM	TRANSLOC	2	Inverse	REFL	CAUS	PASS	Autobenefactive	verb stem	PST TR	1	2/3 SUBJ/OBJ	PEG

==== Referent indexing ====
Japhug finite verbs can form agreement with one or two arguments, depending on the transitivity of the verb. Verb indexation can use a combination of prefixes, suffixes and stem alternation. Person indexation in Japhug in general have neutral alignment, though ergative-absolutive alignment can occur.

		patient									
		1SG	1DU	1PL	2SG	2DU	2PL	3SG	3DU	3PL	general
agent	1SG				ta-Σ	ta-Σ-ndʑi	ta-Σ-nɯ	Σ-a	Σ-a-ndʑi	Σ-a-nɯ	
agent	1DU				ta-Σ	ta-Σ-ndʑi	ta-Σ-nɯ	Σ-tɕi	Σ-tɕi	Σ-tɕi	
agent	1PL				ta-Σ	ta-Σ-ndʑi	ta-Σ-nɯ	Σ-ji	Σ-ji	Σ-ji	
agent	2SG	kɯ-Σ-a	kɯ-Σ-tɕi	kɯ-Σ-ji				tɯ-Σ	tɯ-Σ	tɯ-Σ	
agent	2DU	kɯ-Σ-a-ndʑi	kɯ-Σ-tɕi	kɯ-Σ-ji				tɯ-Σ-ndʑi	tɯ-Σ-ndʑi	tɯ-Σ-ndʑi	
agent	2PL	kɯ-Σ1-a-nɯ	kɯ-Σ-tɕi	kɯ-Σ-ji				tɯ-Σ-nɯ	tɯ-Σ-nɯ	tɯ-Σ-nɯ	
agent	3SG	wɣɯ́-Σ-a	wɣɯ́-Σ-tɕi	wɣɯ́-Σ-ji	tɯ́-wɣ-Σ	tɯ́-wɣ-Σ-ndʑi	tɯ́-wɣ-Σ-nɯ				Σ-Ø
agent	3DU	wɣɯ́-Σ-a-ndʑi	wɣɯ́-Σ-tɕi	wɣɯ́-Σ-ji	tɯ́-wɣ-Σ	tɯ́-wɣ-Σ-ndʑi	tɯ́-wɣ-Σ-nɯ				Σ-ndʑi
agent	3PL	wɣɯ́-Σ-a-nɯ	wɣɯ́-Σ-tɕi	wɣɯ́-Σ-ji	tɯ́-wɣ-Σ	tɯ́-wɣ-Σ-ndʑi	tɯ́-wɣ-Σ-nɯ				Σ-nɯ
agent	general							wɣɯ́-Σ	wɣɯ́-Σ-ndʑi	wɣɯ́-Σ-nɯ	
agent	Intransitive	Σ-a	Σ-tɕi	Σ-ji	tɯ-Σ	tɯ-Σ-ndʑi	tɯ-Σ-nɯ	Σ-Ø	Σ-ndʑi	Σ-nɯ	

ma tú-wɣ-ndza tɕe, ɲɯ-kɯ-z-nɯtɯfɕɤl ɕti
LK IPFV-INV-eat LK IPFV-general:S/O-CAUS-have.diarrhea be.AFF:FACT
"If you eat mold, it causes you diarrhea."

==== Noun incorporation ====
Japhug noun incorporation is attested in denominal derivations. The complex verb, formed from the prefixation of a noun-verb compound, has its direction following the head movement with a strong head-final tendency. The IN precedes the verb root. A Japhug verb can incorporate intransitive subject, object and semi-object, goal/location adjunct, and instrument. Indirect objects and transitive subjects are never incorporated into the verb. Japhug likely has an antipassive NI effect; the noun incorporation subject is not marked with the ergative.

tɤ-tɕɯ ra ko-ɣɯ-cʰɤ-tsʰi-nɯ
3SG.POSS-son PL IMPERF-DENOM-alcohol-drink-3PL.SUBJ
'The guys drank alcohol'

== Sources ==
- Jacques, Guillaume (2004). Phonologie et morphologie du Japhug (rGyalrong) (PDF) (Doctoral thesis) (in French). Université Paris VII.
- Jacques, Guillaume (2007). "La réduplication partielle en japhug, révélatrice des structures syllabiques". Faits de Langues (in French). 29: 9–21. doi:10.1163/19589514-029-01-900000003.
- Jacques, Guillaume 向柏霖; Chen, Zhen 陈珍 (2007). "Chábǎohuà de bù jíwù qiánzhuì jí xiāngguān wèntí" 茶堡話的不及物前綴及相關問題 [An Intransitive Prefix in Japhug rGyalrong and Related Problems] (PDF). Language and Linguistics / Yǔyán jì yǔyánxué (in Chinese). 8 (4): 883–912. Archived from the original (PDF) on 2021-09-28.
- Jacques, Guillaume 向柏霖 (2008). Jiāróngyǔ yánjiū 嘉绒语研究 [A Study on the Gyalrong Language] (in Chinese). Beijing Shi: Minzu chubanshe.
- Jacques, Guillaume (2010). "The inverse in Japhug Rgyalrong". Language and Linguistics. 11 (1): 127–157.
- Jacques, Guillaume (2012). "From Denominal Derivation to Incorporation". Lingua. 122 (11): 1027–1231. doi:10.1016/j.lingua.2012.05.010.
- Jacques, Guillaume (2012). "Argument demotion in Japhug Rgyalrong". In Authier, Gilles; Haude, Katharina (eds.). Ergativity, Valency and Voice. Berlin: De Gruyter Mouton. pp. 199–225.
- Jacques, Guillaume (2013). "Ideophones in Japhug (Rgyalrong)". Anthropological Linguistics. 55 (3): 256–287. doi:10.1353/anl.2013.0014. S2CID 143579082.
- Jacques, Guillaume (2013). "Applicative and tropative derivations in Japhug Rgyalrong". Linguistics of the Tibeto-Burman Area. 36 (2): 1–13.
- Jacques, Guillaume (2013). "Harmonization and disharmonization of affix ordering and basic word order". Linguistic Typology. 17 (2): 187–215. doi:10.1515/lity-2013-0009. S2CID 55555480.
- Jacques, Guillaume (2014). "Denominal affixes as sources of antipassive markers in Japhug Rgyalrong" (PDF). Lingua. 138: 1–22. doi:10.1016/j.lingua.2013.09.011.
- Jacques, Guillaume (2014). "Clause linking in Japhug" (PDF). Linguistics of the Tibeto-Burman Area. 37 (2): 264–328. doi:10.1075/ltba.37.2.05jac.
- Jacques, Guillaume (2015). "The spontaneous-autobenefactive prefix in Japhug Rgyalrong" (PDF). Linguistics of the Tibeto-Burman Area. 38 (2): 271–291. doi:10.1075/ltba.38.2.08jac.
- Jacques, Guillaume (2015). "The origin of the causative prefix in Rgyalrong languages and its implication for proto-Sino-Tibetan reconstruction" (PDF). Folia Linguistica Historica. 36 (1): 165–198. doi:10.1515/flih-2015-0002. S2CID 151841620.
- Jacques, Guillaume (2016). "Subjects, objects and relativization in Japhug" (PDF). Journal of Chinese Linguistics. 44 (1): 1–28. doi:10.1353/jcl.2016.0005. S2CID 160031499.
- Jacques, Guillaume (2016). "From ergative to index of comparison: multiple reanalyses and polyfunctionality". Diachronica. 33 (1): 1–30. doi:10.1075/dia.33.1.01jac.
- Jacques, Guillaume (2021). A Grammar of Japhug. Berlin: Language Science Press. doi:10.5281/zenodo.4548232. ISBN 9783961103058.
- Jacques, Guillaume; Chen, Zhen (2010). Une version Rgyalrong de l'épopée de Gesar (in French). Osaka: National Museum of Ethnology.
- Lin, Youjing 林幼菁; Luo, Erwu 罗尔武 (2003). "Chábǎo Jiāróngyǔ Dàzànghuà de qūxiàng qiánzhuì yǔ dòngcí cígàn de biànhuà" 茶堡嘉戎语大藏话的趋向前缀与动词词干的变化 [Directive Prefixes and Changes of Verb Stems in Dazang rGyalrong]. Mínzú yǔwén 民族語文 (in Chinese). 2003 (4): 19–29.
