= Zbu language =

Rgyalrong language spoken in Sichuan, China

Zbu
- Showu
- Native to: China
- Region: Sichuan
- Native speakers: 6,000 (2012)
- Language family: Sino-Tibetan: Qiangic; Gyalrongic; Gyalrong; Zbu

Language codes
- ISO 639-3: (included in Gyalrong jya)
- Glottolog: zbua1234

Zbu (Chinese: 日部; pinyin: Rìbù), or Showu, is a Gyalrong language spoken in Sichuan, China.

The Khalong Tibetan language has a Zbu/Showu substratum, as evident from its phonology and grammar.

== Phonology ==
=== Consonants ===
		Labial	Dental	Alveolar	Retroflex	Alveopalatal	Palatal	Velar	Uvular
Occlusive	nasal	m	n				ɲ	ŋ	
Occlusive	prenasalized	ᵐb	ⁿd	ⁿdz	ᶯɖʐ	ᶮdʑ	ᶮɟ	ᵑɡ	ᶰɢ
Occlusive	voiced	b	d	dz	ɖʐ	dʑ	ɟ	ɡ	ɢ
Occlusive	voiceless	p	t	ts	ʈʂ	tɕ	c	k	q
Occlusive	aspirated	pʰ	tʰ	tsʰ	ʈʂʰ	tɕʰ	cʰ	kʰ	qʰ
Continuant	voiced	w	ɮ	z	ʐ	ʑ	j	ɣ	ʁ
Continuant	voiceless		ɬ	s	ʂ	ɕ		x	χ

=== Vowels ===
Zbu has nine vowel phonemes: a, o, u, ɤ, ɯ, ø, y, e and i.

== Distribution ==
Gates (2012: 105–106) lists the following locations where Zbu is spoken. It is spoken by over 6,000 people in 28 villages.

- Sìdàbà (Stod-pa) District of Barkam County: in Kāngshān (Khang-sar) and Rìbù (rDzong-’bur) Townships.
- Rangtang County: Wúyī Township and Shili Township, in Shàngdàshígōu, Zhōngdàshígōu, and Xiàdàshígōu Villages; Shili Township also has Shangzhai (sTodsde/Northern Horpa) speakers.
- Gēlètuó Township, Seda County, Ganzi Prefecture: in Tshopo, Nyagluo, Rabde, and Tshekho Villages.
- Southwestern corner of Ābà/rNga-ba County: in Kēhé and Róngān Townships (Asejie, Mengu, Sharga, Ganba, and Tsega Villages). Amdo Tibetan is the local lingua franca.

== Sources ==
- Gong, Xun (2014). "The Personal Agreement System of Zbu Rgyalrong (Ngyaltsu Variety)". Transactions of the Philological Society. 112 (1): 44–60. doi:10.1111/1467-968X.12007.
- Gong, Xun (2018). Le rgyalrong zbu, une langue tibéto-birmane de Chine du Sud-ouest. Une étude descriptive, typologique et comparative [Zbu Rgyalrong, a Tibeto-Burman Language of Southwest China: A Descriptive, Typological and Comparative Study] (Doctoral thesis) (in French). INALCO-CNRS-EHESS.
