= Guillaume Jacques =

French linguist (born 1979)

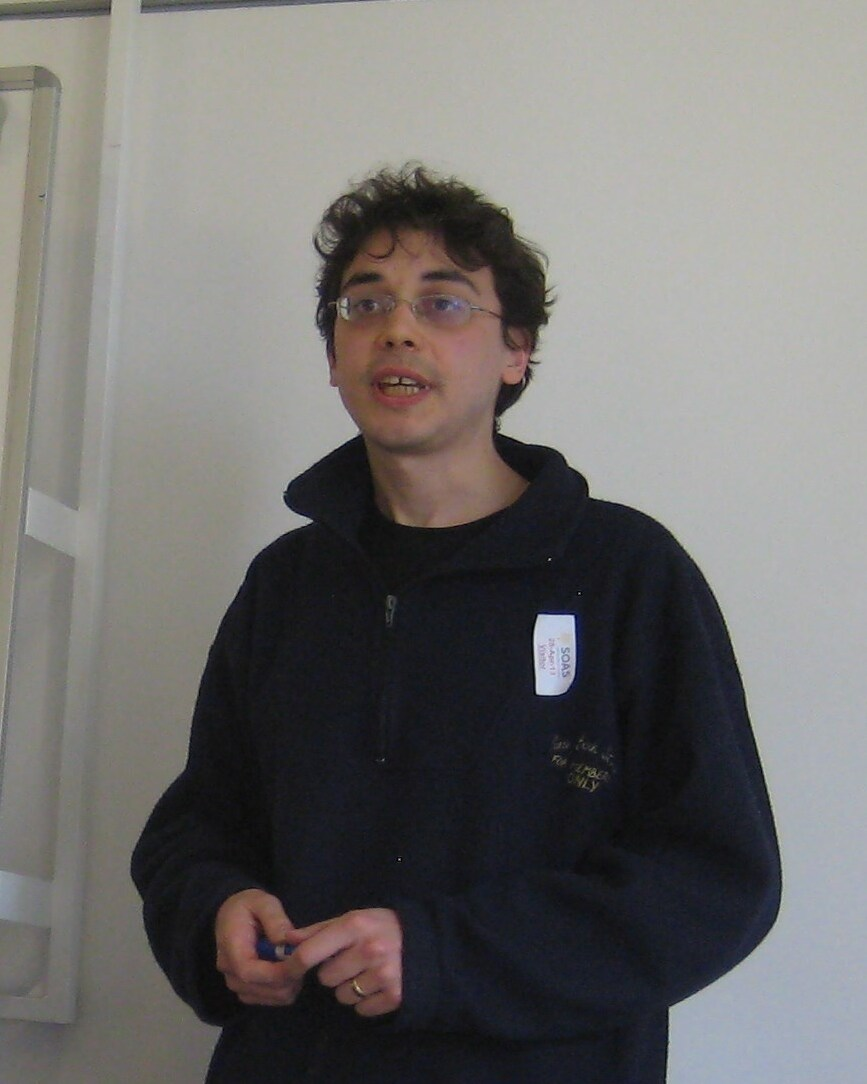
- Guillaume Jacques presenting a talk at SOAS, University of London, April 2013
- Born: 1979 (age 46–47)
- Citizenship: France
- Education: Paris Diderot University
- Known for: Study of Rgyalrongic languages and Tangut language
- Scientific career
- Fields: Linguistics
- Workplaces: Paris Descartes University, Centre National de la Recherche Scientifique
- Doctoral advisor: Marie-Claude Paris
- Other academic advisors: Laurent Sagart

Guillaume Jacques (French pronunciation: [gijom ʒak]; Chinese: 向柏霖; pinyin: Xiàng Bólín; born 1979) is a French linguist who specializes in the study of Sino-Tibetan languages: Old Chinese, Tangut, Tibetan, Gyalrongic and Kiranti languages. He also performs research on the Algonquian and Siouan–Catawban language families and publishes about languages of other families such as Breton. His case studies in historical phonology are set in the framework of panchronic phonology, aiming to formulate generalizations about sound change that are independent of any particular language or language group.

Jacques is one of the main contributors to the Pangloss Collection, an open archive of endangered-language data.

Guillaume Jacques was awarded the CNRS Bronze Medal in 2015.

== Biography ==
Guillaume Jacques studied linguistics at the University of Amsterdam and Paris Diderot University. He obtained his doctorate in 2004 with a dissertation on the phonology and morphology of the Japhug language (one of the Gyalrongic languages), which was based on fieldwork carried out in Sichuan, China in 2002–2003. He taught at Paris Descartes University for four years before taking up a permanent research position at the Centre de recherches linguistiques sur l'Asie orientale (CRLAO).

== Editorial activities ==
Guillaume Jacques is one of the Editors of the linguistics journal Cahiers de Linguistique Asie Orientale. He is a member of the editorial board of Diachronica, Linguistics Vanguard, and Linguistics of the Tibeto-Burman Area.

== Works ==
- 2000. "The character ywij and the reconstruction of the Zhi and Wei rhymes"; Cahiers de Linguistique: Asie Orientale 29.2: 205–222.
- 2003. "Jiarongyu, Zangyu ji Shanggu Hanyu de -s houzhui" (嘉绒语、藏语及上古汉语的-s后缀) [The –s suffix in Rgyalrong, Archaic Chinese and Tibetan]; Minzu Yuwen (民族语文) 2003.1: 12–15.
- 2003. "Un cas de dissimilation labiale en chinois archaïque : la racine 'couvrir, renverser' et son équivalent en tibétain"; Cahiers de Linguistique: Asie Orientale 32.1: 123–130.
- 2004. "Chabaohua de chongdie xingshi" (茶堡话的重叠形式) [Reduplication in Japhug]. Minzu Yuwen (民族语文) 2004.4: 7–11.
- 2007. Textes tangoutes I, Nouveau recueil sur l'amour parental et la piété filiale. München: Lincom Europa. ISBN 978-3-89586-766-8
- 2007. "A shared suppletive pattern in the pronominal systems of Chang Naga and Southern Chang"; Cahiers de Linguistique: Asie Orientale 36.1:61–78.
- 2008. Jiarongyu Yanjiu (嘉绒语研究) [A study on the rGyalrong language]. Beijing: Minzu chubanshe. ISBN 978-7-105-09604-6
- 2008. Xixiayu de mingcixing weiyu (西夏语的名词性谓语) [On nominal predicates in Tangut]; Minzu Yuwen (民族语文) 2008.4: 37–39.
- 2009. "The origin of vowel alternations in the Tangut verb", Language and Linguistics 10.1: 17–27.
- 2010. "The inverse in Japhug Rgyalrong"; Language & Linguistics 11.1:127–157.
- 2010. "Notes complémentaires sur les verbes à alternance ‘dr/'br en tibétain”, Revue d’Etudes Tibétaines, no. 19, Octobre 2010, pp. 27–29.
- 2011. “A Panchronic Study of Aspirated Fricatives, with New Evidence from Pumi.” Lingua 121 (9): 1518–38.
- 2012. “Argument Demotion in Japhug Rgyalrong.” In Ergativity, Valency and Voice, 199–225. Berlin: De Gruyter Mouton.
- 2013. “Harmonization and Disharmonization of Affix Ordering and Basic Word Order.” Linguistic Typology 17.2: 187–217.
- 2013. “Applicative and Tropative Derivations in Japhug Rgyalrong.” Linguistics of the Tibeto-Burman Area 36.2: 1-13.
- 2014. “Denominal Affixes as Sources of Antipassive Markers in Japhug Rgyalrong.” Lingua 138: 1–22.
- 2015. "On the cluster *sr–in Sino-Tibetan", Journal of Chinese Linguistics 43.1: 215–223.
- 2019. "Dated language phylogenies shed light on the ancestry of Sino-Tibetan". by Sagart, Laurent and Jacques, Guillaume and Lai, Yunfan and Ryder, Robin and Thouzeau, Valentin and Greenhill, Simon J. and List, Johann-Mattis. Proceedings of the National Academy of Sciences of the United States of America 21. 10317-10322. doi:10.1073/pnas.1817972116
- 2021. A grammar of Japhug. Berlin: Language Science Press. ISBN 978-3-96110-305-8 (digital), ISBN 978-3-98554-001-3 (hardcover).
