= Obviative =

Distinction between third person pronouns

Within linguistics, obviative (abbreviated obv) third person is a grammatical-person marking that distinguishes a referent that is less important to the discourse from one that is more important (proximate). The obviative is sometimes referred to as the "fourth person".

== Comparison with other grammatical-person marking systems ==
In English and many other European languages, the principal means of distinguishing between multiple third-person referents is using gender or (lack of) reflexive. Thus, in "she saw him", it is clear that there are two third persons because they are of different genders. In "she saw her", it is clear that there are two third persons because otherwise, one would say "she saw herself". However, "she saw her dog" is ambiguous: it could mean that she saw her own dog or that she saw someone else's dog. This is because it is not clear, in some contexts, if "she" and "her" refer to the same person.

An obviative/proximate system has a different way of distinguishing between multiple third-person referents. When there is more than one third person named in a sentence or discourse context, the most important, salient, or topical is marked as "proximate" and any other, less salient entities are marked as "obviative". Subsequent sentences that refer to previously-named entities with pronouns or verbal inflections can then use the proximate and obviative references that have already been established to distinguish between the two.

For example, in the sentence "the quick brown fox jumps over the lazy dog", there are two third-person referents, the fox and the dog. Thus, one of them has to be proximate and the other one has to be obviative, depending on which one the speaker considers more central to the story. If the fox is the more important one, the sentence might look something like "the quick brown fox-PROX jumps-PROX>OBV over the lazy dog-OBV", where PROX>OBV is verbal inflection indicating a proximate subject acting on an obviative object. In that case, a subsequent sentence "and then PROX went-PROX away" would mean that the fox went away.

On the other hand, if the dog is the more important one, the sentence might look something like "the quick brown fox-OBV jumps-OBV>PROX over the lazy dog-PROX", where OBV>PROX is verbal inflection indicating an obviative subject acting on a proximate object. In that case, the same subsequent sentence "and then PROX went-PROX away" would mean instead that the dog went away. By contrast, an equivalent subsequent sentence in English, such as "and then he went away", would not necessarily indicate whether "he" is the fox or the dog.

An analogy that has been used to explain obviation is that the proximate is the entity in the "spotlight", and any other, obviative entities are out of the spotlight or "hangers-on".

== Geography ==
=== North America ===
Obviate/proximate distinctions are common in some indigenous language families in northern North America. Algonquian languages are perhaps best known for obviation, but the feature occurs also in some Salishan languages and in the language isolate Kutenai as well as in the more southern Keresan languages.

=== Africa ===
Obviative markers are used in Africa in some Nilo-Saharan and Niger–Congo languages.

=== Eurasia ===
Obviation has also been attested in the Northeast Caucasian Ingush language in the northern Caucasus.

== Cross-linguistic patterns ==
- If animacy is involved, animate noun phrases tend to be proximate, and inanimate noun phrases tend to be obviative.
- Possessors are frequently required to be proximate, with possessees thus required to be obviative.
- Obviation is most common in head-marking languages since the obviative is useful in disambiguating otherwise unmarked nominals.
- The obviative referent seems to be always the marked form, and the proximate is unmarked.
- Obviative marking tends to apply only to the third person, but it has been attested in the second person in a handful of Nilo-Saharan languages.
- Proximate/obviative assignments are preserved throughout the clauses and are also often constant over longer discourse segments.

== Examples ==
=== Ojibwe ===
The following is a typical example of obviate/proximate morphology in the Eastern dialect of the Algonquian Ojibwe in which the obviative is marked on nouns and demonstratives and reflected in pronominal verb affixes:

Maaba dash shkinwe wgii‒bwaadaa[n] wii‒bi‒yaanid myagi‒nishnaaben waa‒bi‒nsigwaajin
Maabamh idash oshkinawe ogii‒bawaadaanh wii‒bi‒ayaanid mayagi‒anishinaaben waa‒bi‒nisigowaajin
maabam[h] idash oshkinawe o=gii‒bawaad=am=in[h] wii‒bi‒ayaa=in=id mayagi‒anishinaabe=an X=wii‒bi‒niS=igo=waa=id=in
this EMP young.man 3=PAST-dream=3.INAN=OBV FUT-coming-be.at=OBV=3 foreign-people=OBV REL=FUT-coming-kill=INV=3=OBV
'Then this (PROX) young man (PROX) dreamed (PROX) that foreigners (OBV) would come (OBV) to kill (OBV) them (PROX).'

That example shows that the proximate referent need not necessarily be the subject of a clause.

=== Potawatomi ===
Potawatomi (an Algonquian Language) is notable for having two degrees of obviation, "obviation" and "further obviation." "Further obviation" is rare, but when it occurs, a "further obviative" referent, deemed to be even less salient than the obviative referent, can be marked by an additional obviative suffix. The following is the sole example to appear in the literature on Potawatomi:

ktokmamnannun
{[gdogmamnannën (g[i]doog[i]maam[i]naan[i]nan)]}
[g[i]do=og[i]maa=m=[i]naan‒[i]n‒an]
our (12) chief(s) (3″)

Charles Hockett posited the following example, but he never checked it to see if it was grammatical:

waposo waposo‒n waposo‒n‒un
rabbit rabbit‒OBV rabbit‒OBV‒OBV
proximate obviative {further obviative}

=== Ingush ===
Obviation in Ingush, a heavily dependent-marking language, is an exception to the generalization that the obviative occurs in head-marking languages. Obviation is not overtly marked in Ingush but is implied, as certain constructions are impossible unless one referent has salience over another.

For example, if a non-subject-referent has salience over the subject and precedes the other co-referent, reflexivisation (normally used only when there is a coreferent to the subject) is possible. That is shown in the example below whose non-subject-referent appears to have salience over the subject:

Muusaajna shii zhwalii t'y-weaxar
Musa-DAT 3S-REFL-GEN dog {on-bark-WITNESSED PAST}
'Musa's dog barked at him.'

If the subject is salient ("proximate"), on the other hand, the subject's possessor does not antecede the third-person object, and the possession must be indirectly implicated as follows:

Muusaa siesaguo liex
Musa wife-ERG seek
'Musa's wife is looking for him.' (Literally, 'The wife is looking for Musa.')

== See also ==
- Direct–inverse language
