= Direct–inverse alignment =

Proposed concept in linguistic typology

The definition of a direct–inverse language is a matter under research in linguistic typology, but it is widely understood to involve different grammar for transitive predications according to the relative positions of their "subject" and their "object" on a person hierarchy, which, in turn, is some combination of saliency and animacy specific to a given language. The direct construction is the unmarked one. The direct construction is used when the subject of the transitive clause outranks the object in the person hierarchy, and the inverse is used when the object outranks the subject.

The existence of direct–inverse morphosyntax is usually accompanied by proximate–obviative morphosyntax. The direct–inverse dimension subsumes the proximate–obviative dimension. Across languages, obviation almost always involves the third person (although second-person obviation is reported for some Nilo-Saharan languages), and the direct–inverse alternation is usually presented as being a way of marking the proximate–obviative distinction between two (or more) third-person arguments of a sentence. However, there are at least two languages with inverse systems, the Mesoamerican languages Zoque and Huastec, in which inverse morphosyntax is never used when both subject and object are third person but only when one of the arguments is third person, and the other is a speech act participant (SAP), the first or second person.

== Morphosyntactic variation across inverse-type languages ==
Neither a morphological feature nor a syntactic feature is common to all inverse systems.

Direct-inverse systems on verbs coexist with the various morphosyntactic alignments in nouns. In some inverse languages, including all Mesoamerican inverse languages, the direct-inverse alternation changes the morphosyntactic alignment, and the language is said to have hierarchical alignment.

Klaiman has suggested four common properties of inverse languages:

1. Core participants of transitive predicates are ranked on a hierarchy of salience, topicality or animacy.
2. Only transitive predicates can participate in the direct–inverse alternation.
3. A morphosyntactic device should be used to signal whether the most salient participant is notional subject or notional object.
4. Direct–inverse alternation does not entail detransitivization.

Some languages that comply with Klaiman's definition of an inverse language are Maasai, Carib, Wastek, Chukchi, the Algonquian languages and some Athabaskan languages like Koyukon and Navajo, Mapudungun and Movima (language isolates), rGyalrong (Sino-Tibetan), Kopar (Sepik), and some Mixe–Zoquean languages. On the other hand, the Mixean language Oluteco has been reported to have an inverse system which does not conform to the second rule, as certain intransitive verbs and passives of ditransitives also can take inverse morphology.

=== Inverse morphology in Ojibwe ===
In Ojibwe, an Algonquian language of North America, the person hierarchy is second person > first person > third person proximate > third person obviative. Since the morphology of Ojibwe has no case distinctions (an Ojibwe nominal phrase does not change when its relations to the other sentence constituents change), the only way to distinguish subject from object in a transitive verb with two participants is through direct–inverse suffixes. A direct suffix indicates that the action is performed by someone higher on the person hierarchy on someone lower on the person hierarchy:

o- bizindaw -aa -n
3- listen.to -DIRECT -3OBVIATIVE
"He listens to the other one"

An inverse suffix indicates that the action is performed by someone lower on the person hierarchy on someone higher on the person hierarchy (such as by the speaker on the addressee or an obviative third person on a proximate):

o- bizindaw -igoo -n
3- listen.to -INVERSE -3OBVIATIVE
"The other one listens to him"

As can be seen, the only difference between these two verbs is the direct–inverse opposition, rather than case markers (or word order, when distinct nominals are used). An inverse verb is not equivalent to a passive verb. There is a separate passivity marker, denoted in literature as "indefinite person (X)", ranked in topicality hierarchy below first and second persons, but higher than animate and inanimate third persons:

{} bizindaw -aa
X- listen.to -DIRECT
"He is listened to"

=== Semantic and pragmatic inverse in Sahaptin ===
Sahaptin, an Amerindian language of the northwestern United States, has an inverse marked by the verbal prefix pá-. It indicates transitive action from the second to the first person when both arguments are SAPs. That can be called the semantic inverse.

q̓ínu -ša =maš
see -ASP =1SG/2SG
"I see you"

pá- q̓inu -ša =nam
INV- see -ASP =2SG
"you see me"

Sahaptin pá- does not occur with transitive action between SAPs and the third person, but it does occur between third-person participants. The contrast can be elicited with multiple clause examples such as given below. In the inverse the semantic patient is coreferential with the subject in the preceding clause. That can be called a pragmatic inverse.

wínš i- q̓ínu -šana wapaanłá -an ku i- ʔíƛ̓iyawi -ya paanáy
man 3NOM- see -ASP grizzly -ACC and 3NOM- kill -PST 3ACC.SG
"the man saw the grizzly and he killed it"

wínš i- q̓ínu -šana wapaanłá -an ku pá- ʔiƛ̓iyawi -ya
man 3NOM- see -ASP grizzly -ACC and INV- kill -PST
"the man saw the grizzly and it killed him"

The pragmatic inverse topicalizes the patient, but its nominal, if present, retains its accusative case-marking.

ku pá- ʔiƛ̓iyawi -ya paanáy
and INV- kill -PST 3ACC.SG
"and it killed him"

== Japanese ==
The different Japanese verbs for "to give", used for both favours and physical objects, can be considered an instance of direct–inverse alignment. Ageru (上げる) is used when the subject, the giver, is lower down on the person hierarchy than the beneficiary, the indirect object. Meanwhile, kureru (くれる) or kudasaru (下さる) must be used if the subject is higher up. For example, the first person in Japanese is lower than the second on the person hierarchy, so you would say:

私は あなたに プレゼントを 上げた。
Watashi-wa anata-ni purezento-o age-ta
1SG-TOP 2SG-IO present-OB give-PAST
'I gave you the present.'

あなたは 私に プレゼントを くれた。
Anata-wa watashi-ni purezento-o kure-ta
2SG-TOP 1SG-IO present-OB give[INV]-PAST
'You gave me the present.'

Switching the subject and object in either example, or switching the verbs between the two sentences would be unacceptable.

== Bibliography ==
- Gregersen, Edgar A. (1977). Language in Africa: an introductory survey. New York: Gordon and Breach Science Publishers Inc.
- Klaiman, M.H. (1989). "Inverse voice and head-marking in Tanoan languages". Chicago Linguistics Society (25): 258–71.
- Klaiman, M. H. (1992). "Inverse languages" (PDF). Lingua. 88 (3–4): 227–261. doi:10.1016/0024-3841(92)90043-i. Archived from the original (PDF) on 14 January 2022.
- Klaiman, M. H. (1993). "The relationship of inverse voice and head-marking in Arizona Tewa and other Tanoan languages". Studies in Language. 17 (2): 343–70. doi:10.1075/sl.17.2.04kla.
- Rude, Noel (2009). "Transitivity in Sahaptin". Northwest Journal of Linguistics. 3 (3): 1–37.
- Valentine, J. Randolph (2001) Nishnaabemwin Reference Grammar. Toronto: University of Toronto Press. ISBN 978-0-8020-8389-0
- Zavala, Roberto (2002). "Verb classes, semantic roles and inverse in Olutec". In Levy Podolsky, Paulette (ed.). Del Cora al Maya Yucateco. Estudios sobre lenguas americanas. Vol. 2. UNAM, Instituto de Investigaciones Filológicas, Seminario de Lenguas Indígenas. pp. 179–268.
- Zavala, Roberto (2007). "Inversion and obviation in Mesoamerica". In Austin, Peter K.; Simpson, Andrew (eds.). Endangered languages. Linguistische berichte sonderheft. Vol. 14. pp. 267–305.
