= Circassian grammar =

Grammar of the Circassian languages

Circassian is a pair of closely related Northwest Caucasian languages — Adyghe (West Circassian) and Kabardian (East Circassian) — that share a common polysynthetic grammatical structure with an ergative verb-final clause structure and rich verb morphology. Both varieties have remarkably simple nouns, marking only for number, case, and definiteness, while the verb is the most complex part of the language: it is highly agglutinative and polysynthetic, inflecting with prefixes and suffixes for several persons (polypersonality), number, tense, mood, causative, and a large array of preverbs. Notions such as "can", "must", and "if", expressed as separate words in most European languages, are typically expressed with verbal affixes in Circassian.

This article describes the grammar of both varieties together, noting differences between Adyghe and Kabardian where they occur.

== Ergative–absolutive alignment ==
Unlike the majority of the world's languages, which follow nominative–accusative alignment, Circassian follows ergative–absolutive alignment. In a nominative–accusative language such as English, the single argument of an intransitive verb ("she" in "she walks") behaves grammatically like the agent of a transitive verb ("she" in "she finds it"). In an ergative–absolutive language, the subject of an intransitive verb instead behaves like the object of a transitive verb, and differently from the agent of a transitive verb.

The distinction between syntactic cases is crucial for understanding who is doing the action and to whom. Nouns take the following case roles depending on the verb's transitivity:

- Absolutive case: Marked with the suffix -р /-r/. It indicates the subject of an intransitive verb or the direct object of a transitive verb — the participant that is changed (created, altered, moved, or ended) by the verb.
- Ergative case: Marked with the suffix -м /-m/. It indicates the subject (agent) of a transitive verb — the participant that causes the change.
- Oblique case: Also marked with the suffix -м /-m/. It marks the target of the action in bivalent intransitive verbs, the indirect object (dative) in ditransitive verbs, and a locative argument in transitive verbs with prepositional prefixes. Its state is not changed by the verb.

The following basic example demonstrates this ergative–absolutive case marking system (the Adyghe and Kabardian forms are identical here):

Sentence:	Ӏанэр мэкъутэ.		ЛӀым Ӏанэр екъутэ.		
Word:	Ӏанэ-р	мэкъутэ	ЛӀым	Ӏанэр	екъутэ
Gloss:	The table-ABS	breaks	The man-ERG	the table-ABS	breaks
Function:	S	VERB_{intrans}	A	O	VERB_{trans}
Translation:	"The table breaks."		"The man breaks the table."		

Here "table" carries the absolutive mark -р /-r/ while "man" carries the ergative mark -м /-m/. The verb "break" appears in an intransitive form (мэкъутэ) and a transitive form (екъутэ). The example uses SOV (subject–object–verb) order, but Circassian allows any word order.

It is important to distinguish intransitive from transitive verbs, because the case of the subject and object nouns, as well as the verb's person-marking prefixes, depend on it. A mistake here can drastically change the meaning of a sentence by switching the roles of subject and object. The following pair illustrates this: the verb "to see" (Adyghe елъэгъун, Kabardian елъэгъун) is transitive while "to look at" (Adyghe еплъын, Kabardian еплъын) is intransitive, so although the word for "boy" carries the same -м suffix in both, the sentences differ in meaning:

Ady	КӀалэм пшъашъэр елъэгъу	"The boy is seeing the girl." (transitive)
Kbd	ЩӀалэм пщащэр йолъэгъу	"The boy is seeing the girl." (transitive)
Ady	КӀалэм пшъашъэр еплъы	"The girl is looking at the boy." (intransitive)
Kbd	ЩӀалэм пщащэр йоплъ	"The girl is looking at the boy." (intransitive)

== Nouns ==
Circassian nouns inflect for number, case, and definiteness. The plural suffix is -хэ (Adyghe унэ "house" → унэхэр "houses"), though plural meaning is often carried by the verb instead. Collective nouns act as a plurale tantum — they take no plural suffix but trigger plural agreement elsewhere — for example Adyghe жылэ / Kabardian къуажэ "village" and Adyghe унагъо / Kabardian унагъуэ "family". A definite noun carries a case marker, while an indefinite one is usually unmarked (Adyghe кӀалэ "a boy" vs. кӀалэр "the boy"; Kabardian щӀалэ vs. щӀалэр).

As an ergative–absolutive language, Circassian declines nouns in four cases. The two varieties pattern alike; the table gives Adyghe forms first, then Kabardian:

Case	Suffix	Ady example	Kbd example
Absolutive	-р	кӀалэр "the boy"	щӀалэр "the boy"
Ergative–Oblique	-м	кӀалэм "the boy's / to the boy"	щӀалэм "the boy's / to the boy"
Instrumental–directional	-(м)кӀэ	къэлэмымкӀэ "with the pencil"	къэрэндащымкӀэ "with the pencil"
Adverbial	Ady -эу, Kbd -у(э)	кӀалэу "as a boy"	щӀалу "as a boy"

The ergative–oblique case marks the transitive subject, the possessor, the indirect object, and location. The instrumental–directional marks means or direction, and the adverbial turns the noun into a modifier.

The third-person pronouns double as demonstratives and use suppletive forms rather than the regular suffixes: ар / ахэр (absolutive) and Adyghe ащ / ахэм, Kabardian абы / абыхэм (ergative–oblique).

When a noun is followed by an adjective, the case suffix attaches to the adjective rather than the noun (Adyghe пшъэшъэ дахэр, Kabardian пщащэ дахэр "the pretty girl"). Possession is marked on the possessed noun differently in the two varieties — in Adyghe by a prefix (икӀалэ "his/her boy"), in Kabardian by a separate possessive word (и щӀалэ) — and adjectives can become abstract nouns with -агъэ (дахэ "pretty" → дахагъэ "beauty"). New nouns are also formed by compounding and by productive suffixes such as -пӀэ "place" (еджапӀэ "school") and -кӀо/-кӀуэ "agent" (Adyghe еджакӀо, Kabardian еджакӀуэ "student"). Circassian is a pro-drop language, so subject and object pronouns are often omitted because the verb marks person and number.

=== Intransitive and transitive subjects ===
In intransitive verbs the subject is in the absolutive case, indicating that it is changing (created, altered, moved, or ended):

Ady	КӀалэр макӀо	"The boy is going."
Kbd	ЩӀалэр макӀуэ	"The boy is going."

The verb "to hit" (Adyghe еон, Kabardian еуэн /jawan/) describes the motion of hitting rather than the impact, so the wall is treated as an oblique target rather than a changed object:

Ady	ЛӀыр дэпкъым еуэ	"The man is hitting the wall." (lit. "the man is hitting at the wall.")
Kbd	ЛӀыр дэпкъым йоуэ	"The man is hitting the wall." (lit. "the man is hitting at the wall.")

In transitive verbs the subject is in the ergative case, indicating that it causes change to the object, which is in the absolutive:

Ady	КӀалэм дэпкъыр ыкъутагъ	"The boy destroyed the wall."
Kbd	ЩӀалэм дэпкъыр икъутащ	"The boy destroyed the wall."

When a transitive verb carries a prepositional prefix, the object it changes stands in the absolutive while the locative target of the preposition takes the oblique. Here the rock moves (absolutive) and the wall is the oblique target:

Ady	ЛӀым мыжъор дэпкъым тедзэ	"The man is throwing the rock at the wall."
Kbd	ЛӀым мывэр дэпкъым тедзэ	"The man is throwing the rock at the wall."

== Possession ==
The two varieties mark possession quite differently.

- Adyghe distinguishes two categories: inalienable (organic) possession — for things that cannot be separated from the possessor (body parts, kin, intrinsic positions) — and alienable (proprietary) possession — for transferable property, objects, and concepts. Each is marked by a prefix attached directly to the noun.
- Kabardian does not make this distinction. It marks all possession with a single set of possessive words that stand as separate words before the noun: си "my", уи "your", и "his/her", ди "our", фи "your (pl.)", я "their".

=== Inalienable possession (Adyghe) ===
This category exists only in Adyghe. It is marked by a prefix attached directly to the noun stem and strictly includes:

- Body parts: e.g. head, heart, leg, soul.
- Kinship terms: e.g. mother, brother, daughter.
- Name: ыцӀэ "his/her name".
- Part–whole and spatial relations: positional words treated as "body parts" of an object, e.g. ычӀэгъ "its underside", ыкӀоцӀ "its inside", ыкӀыб "its back", ыпэ "its front (nose)", ынакъо "its half".

Person	Prefix	Example
1st sg	с-, сы-	сшъхьэ "my head", сыгу "my heart"
2nd sg	п-, у-	плъакъо "your leg", унэ "your eye", пӀэ "your hand"
3rd sg	ы-	ышы "his brother", ыпхъу "his daughter", ыкъу "his son"
1st pl	т-, ты-	тынэхэр "our eyes", тшъхьэхэр "our heads", тӀэжъуамбэхэр "our toes/nails"
2nd pl	шъу-	шъулъакъохэр "your legs", шъушъхьацыхэр "your hair"
3rd pl	а-	агу "their hearts", алъакъо "their legs"

Kabardian, lacking this category, expresses the same meanings with its ordinary possessive words written separately, e.g. си щхьэ "my head", и щӀагъ "its underside".

=== Alienable possession ===
Alienable possession covers separable items such as property, animals, concepts, and material objects. In Adyghe it is marked by a prefix — differing from the inalienable prefixes by an added vowel -и- /-i-/ — attached to the noun; Kabardian places its possessive word as a separate word before the noun:

Person	Adyghe (prefixed)	Kabardian (separate word)	English
1st sg	ситхылъ	си тхылъ	"my book"
2nd sg	уитхылъ	уи тхылъ	"your book"
3rd sg	итхылъ	и тхылъ	"his/her book"
1st pl	тиунэ	ди унэ	"our home"
2nd pl	шъуиунэ	фи унэ	"your (pl.) home"
3rd pl	яунэ	я унэ	"their home"

The following examples show possession in context — Adyghe with a joined prefix, Kabardian with a separate word:

Ady	Сиунэ шъукъакӀу	"Come to my house."
Kbd	Си унэ фыкъакӀуэ	"Come to my house."
Ady	ТимашинэкӀэ къалэм тэкӀо	"We are going to the city with our car."
Kbd	Ди машинэкӀэ къалэм докӀуэ	"We are going to the city with our car."

== Pronouns ==
Circassian pronouns fall into the following groups: personal, demonstrative, possessive, interrogative, determinative/reflexive, and indefinite.

=== Personal pronouns ===
Strictly speaking, dedicated personal pronouns exist only for the first and second persons; the third person is expressed with demonstrative pronouns (see below).

- 1st person: Circassian сэ "I"; Adyghe тэ / Kabardian дэ "we".
- 2nd person: Adyghe о / Kabardian уэ "you" (sg.); Adyghe шъо / Kabardian фэ "you" (pl.).

Unlike nouns, the 1st- and 2nd-person pronouns do not distinguish the absolutive from the ergative: the two cases merge into a common form.

Case	Language	First person		Second person	
Case	Language	Singular (I)	Plural (we)	Singular (you)	Plural (you)
Absolutive / Ergative	Ady	сэ	тэ	о	шъо
Absolutive / Ergative	Kbd	сэ	дэ	уэ	фэ
Instrumental	Ady	сэркӀэ	тэркӀэ	оркӀэ	шъоркӀэ
Instrumental	Kbd	сэркӀэ	дэркӀэ	уэркӀэ	фэркӀэ
Adverbial	Ady	сэрэу	тэрэу	орэу	шъорэу
Adverbial	Kbd	сэру	дэру	уэру	фэру

Examples of usage:

Ady	Сэ седжэ	"I read / I am studying." (subject)
Kbd	Сэ соджэ	"I read / I am studying." (subject)
Ady	О уеджэ тхылъым	"You are reading the book." (transitive subject)
Kbd	Уэ уоджэ тхылъым	"You are reading the book." (transitive subject)
Ady	Тэ тэкӀо еджапӀэм	"We are going to school." (intransitive subject)
Kbd	Дэ докӀуэ еджапӀэм	"We are going to school." (intransitive subject)
Ady	Шъо Ӏоф шъошӀэ	"You (plural) are working." (plural subject)
Kbd	Фэ Ӏуэху фощӀэ	"You (plural) are working." (plural subject)
Ady	СэркӀэ мы Ӏофы́р къины	"This job is hard for me." (instrumental — beneficiary)
Kbd	СэркӀэ мы Ӏуэхур гугъущ	"This job is hard for me." (instrumental — beneficiary)
Ady	ТэркӀэ мы шхыныр лъапӀэ	"This food is expensive for us." (instrumental — beneficiary)
Kbd	ДэркӀэ мы шхыныр лъапӀэ	"This food is expensive for us." (instrumental — beneficiary)
Ady	Сэ тхылъым седжагъэ	"I read the book." (transitive subject)
Kbd	Сэ тхылъым седжащ	"I read the book." (transitive subject)

=== Demonstrative pronouns ===
Demonstrative pronouns point to objects and also function as third-person pronouns. They are distinguished by distance and visibility:

- Proximal (this): Circassian мы — close to the speaker.
- Distal, visible (that): Circassian мо — visible at a known distance.
- Neutral / invisible (that): Circassian а — far away or invisible (Adyghe also uses it for abstract referents).

Adyghe additionally has an emphatic demonstrative джэ for an invisible referent already established in the conversation, and an interrogative form тэ "which".

Unlike personal pronouns, demonstratives do distinguish cases. The absolutive and adverbial forms are shared by both languages (shown as Circassian); the two differ in the ergative–oblique and instrumental, where Adyghe uses the -щ stem and Kabardian the -бы stem.

Demonstrative pronouns
Number	Case	Language	Demonstrative		
Number	Case	Language	мы (this/these)	мо (that/those, visible)	а (that/those, neutral)
Singular	Absolutive	Circassian	мыр	мор	ар
Singular	Ergative / Oblique	Ady	мыщ	мощ	ащ
Singular	Ergative / Oblique	Kbd	мыбы	мобы	абы
Singular	Instrumental	Ady	мыщкӀэ	мощкӀэ	ащкӀэ
Singular	Instrumental	Kbd	мыбыкӀэ	мобыкӀэ	абыкӀэ
Singular	Adverbial	Circassian	мырэу	морэу	арэу
Plural	Absolutive	Ady	мыхэр	—	ахэр
Plural	Absolutive	Kbd	мыхэр	мохэр	ахэр
Plural	Ergative / Oblique	Ady	мыхэм	—	ахэм
Plural	Ergative / Oblique	Kbd	мыбыхэм	мобыхэм	абыхэм
Plural	Instrumental	Ady	мыхэмкӀэ	—	ахэмкӀэ
Plural	Instrumental	Kbd	мыбыхэмкӀэ	мобыхэмкӀэ	абыхэмкӀэ
Plural	Adverbial	Ady	мыхэрэу	—	ахэрэу
Plural	Adverbial	Kbd	мыхэрэу	мохэрэу	ахэрэу

Adyghe forms the demonstrative plural regularly with the -хэ- suffix; the source attests the absolutive (мыхэр "these", ахэр "those/they") and the ergative–oblique (мыхэм, ахэм).

Examples:

Ady	Мы унэм нахьи мо унакӀэу къашӀырэр нахь дах	"This house (close) is more beautiful than that house (far) which is being built."
Kbd	Мы унэм нэхърэ мо яухуэ унэщӀэр нэхъ дахэщ	"This house (close) is more beautiful than that house (far) which is being built."
Ady	А тхылъэ́у пщэфыгъэм сегъэплъыба	"Show me that book you bought."
Kbd	А тхылъэу къэпщэхуар къызгъэлъагъу	"Show me that book you bought."
Ady	Мыщ хьалыгъу ешхы	"This person/animal eats bread." (ergative)
Kbd	Мыбы щӀакхъуэ йошхы	"This person/animal eats bread." (ergative)
Ady	МыщкӀэ кӀалэр къакӀо	"The boy is coming from this way." (instrumental)
Kbd	МыбыкӀэ щӀалэр къакӀуэ	"The boy is coming from this way." (instrumental)

As determiners, the demonstrative stems precede the noun:

Ady	Kbd	English
мы Ӏанэ	мы Ӏэнэ	"this table"
мо пшъашъэ	мо пщащэ	"that girl (visible)"
а кӀалэм еӀо	а щӀалэм жеӀэ	"that boy (invisible) says"
джэ пшъашъэ	—	"that girl (mentioned before) — джэ has no Kabardian counterpart"
тэ Ӏанэ?	—	"which table? — the interrogative stem тэ has no Kabardian counterpart"

==== Derived demonstrative adverbs ====
The demonstrative stems combine with various suffixes to form adverbs and pronouns of location, area, similarity, manner, time, and pointing. The Adyghe system is the fullest, distinguishing all five stems:

Category	Root: мы (this)	Root: мо (that, vis.)	Root: а (that, invis.)	Root: джэ (that, ref.)	Root: тэ (which/inter.)
Location	мыдэ (here)	модэ (there)	адэ (yonder)	—	тэдэ (where?)
Area	мыу (here)	моу (there)	ау (yonder)	джэу (there)	тэу (where?)
Similarity	мыщфэд (like this)	мощфэд (like that)	ащфэд (like that)	—	тэщфэд (like what?)
Action / manner	мыущтэу (like this)	моущтэу (like that)	аущтэу (like that)	джэущтэу (like that)	тэущтэу (how?)
Time	мыщыгъум (now)	—	ащыгъум (then)	—	тэщыгъум (at what time?)
Indicatory	мары (this one)	моры (that one)	ары (yon one)	джэры (that one)	тэры (which one?)

Kabardian forms the same location adverbs (мыдэ "here", модэ "there", адэ "there") but builds similarity with the suffix -пхуэд: мыпхуэд "like this", мопхуэд "like that", апхуэд "like that".

=== Possessive pronouns ===
Independent possessive pronouns express ownership ("mine", "yours", "theirs") and differ from the adnominal possessives used with a noun (Adyghe prefixes си-, уи-; Kabardian separate words си, уи).

These pronouns decline like nouns through all four cases (see the declension table below). Examples:

Ady	Мы унэр сэсый	"This house is mine."
Kbd	Мы унэр сысейщ	"This house is mine."
Ady	Мы чъыгхэр тэтыех	"These trees are ours."
Kbd	Мы жыгхэр дыдейхэщ	"These trees are ours."

Full declension:

Case	Lang	1st person		2nd person		3rd person	
Case	Lang	singular	plural	singular	plural	singular	plural
Absolutive	Ady	сэсый	тэтый	оуий	шъошъуй	ий	яй
Absolutive	Kbd	сэсий	дэдий	уэуий	фэфий	ий	яй
Ergative	Ady	сэсый	тэтый	оуий	шъошъуй	ий	яй
Ergative	Kbd	сэсый	дэдий	уэуий	фэфий	ий	яй
Instrumental	Ady	сэсиемкӀэ	тэтиемкӀэ	оуиемкӀэ	шъошъуиемкӀэ	иемкӀэ	яемкӀэ
Instrumental	Kbd	сэсиемкӀэ	дэдиемкӀэ	уэуиемкӀэ	фэфиемкӀэ	иемкӀэ	яемкӀэ
Adverbial	Ady	сэсиеу	тэтиеу	оуиеу	шъошъуиеу	иеу	яеу
Adverbial	Kbd	сэсийу	дэдийу	уэуийу	фэфийу	иеу	яеу

=== Interrogative pronouns ===
Ady	Kbd	English
хэт (хэта)	хэт	"who?" (for humans)
сыд (сыда)	сыт	"what?" (for non-humans / things)
тхьапш	дапщэ	"how much / how many?"
тары	дэтхэнэ	"which?"
сыдигъу	сыт щыгъуэ	"when?"
тыдэ	дэнэ	"where?"
сыд фэд	сыт хуэдэ	"what kind of?"

Examples:

Ady	Хэт зыӀуагъэр?	"Who said that?"
Kbd	Хэт жызыӀар?	"Who said that?"
Ady	Хэт унэм къихьагъэр?	"Who entered the house?"
Kbd	Хэт унэм къихьар?	"Who entered the house?"
Ady	Сыд плъэгъугъа? — Хьэ слъэгъугъэ.	"What did you see? — I saw a dog."
Kbd	Сыт плъэгъуар? — Хьэ слъэгъуащ.	"What did you see? — I saw a dog."
Ady	Сыд къэпхьыгъэр?	"What did you bring?"
Kbd	Сыт къэпхьар?	"What did you bring?"

=== Determinative and reflexive pronouns ===
This group includes reflexive pronouns ("self") and quantifiers ("all", "every"):

Ady	Kbd	English
ежь	езы	"self"
зэкӀэ	псори	"all"
шъхьадж	щхьэж	"every / each"
ышъхьэкӀэ	ищхьэкӀэ	"personally"
хэти (хэтрэ́)	хэти	"everyone, any (person)"
сыди (сыдрэ́)	сыти	"everything, any (thing)"

Examples:

Ady	Хэти зышъхьамысыжьэу Ӏоф ышӀэн фае	"Everyone must work without pitying himself."
Kbd	Хэти зыщымысыжу Ӏуэху ищӀэн хуейщ	"Everyone must work without pitying himself."
Ady	Сыдрэ Ӏофри дэгъу, угу къыбдеӀэу бгъэцакӀэмэ	"Any job is good if done with a full heart."
Kbd	Сыт хуэдэ Ӏуэхури дэгъущ, угу къыбдэту бгъэзащӀэмэ	"Any job is good if done with a full heart."

=== Indefinite pronoun ===
The primary indefinite pronoun is Adyghe зыгорэ / Kabardian зыгуэрэ "someone, something, some, one"; it covers notions corresponding to English "someone", "something", "somewhere", "sometime", etc. It declines like a noun:

Case	Singular		Plural	
Case	Ady	Kbd	Ady	Kbd
Absolutive	зыгорэ	зыгуэрэ	зыгорэхэр	зыгуэрэхэр
Ergative / Oblique	зыгорэм	зыгуэрэм	зыгорэхэмэ	зыгуэрэхэмэ
Instrumental	зыгорэ(м)кӀэ	зыгуэрэ(м)кӀэ	зыгорэхэ(м)кӀэ	зыгуэрэхэ(м)кӀэ
Adverbial	зыгорэу	зыгуэрэу	зыгорэхэу	зыгуэрэхэу

Examples:

Ady	Зыгорэ пчъэм къытеуагъ	"Someone knocked on the door."
Kbd	Зыгуэрэ бжэм къытеуащ	"Someone knocked on the door."
Ady	А тхылъ гъэшӀэгъоным зыгорэ къытегущыӀэгъагъ	"Someone spoke about this interesting book."
Kbd	А тхылъ гъэщӀэгъуэным зыгуэрэ къытегущыӀащ	"Someone spoke about this interesting book."

== Adjectives ==
Circassian adjectives are morphologically close to nouns and share their number and case markers. The defining feature is phrase-final affixation: when an adjective modifies a noun, the noun stays in its bare stem and the markers for number (-хэ) and case attach to the end of the whole phrase — normally to the adjective (Adyghe пшъэшъэ дахэр, Kabardian пщащэ дахэр "the beautiful girl"). The same holds for adjectival suffixes such as the augmentative Adyghe -шхо / Kabardian -шхуэ "big" (унэшхохэр / унэшхуэхэр "the big houses"). Qualitative adjectives ("good", "tall") follow the noun, while relative or material adjectives ("iron", "wooden") precede it and do not inflect (Adyghe гъучӀ пӀэкӀорыр, Kabardian гъущӀ пӀэкӀорыр "the iron bed"). Used on its own, an adjective declines like a noun through all four cases (Adyghe фыжьыр / Kabardian хужьыр "the white one").

Degree is expressed analytically: the comparative with the particle Adyghe нахь / Kabardian нэхъ "more", and the superlative with Adyghe анахь / Kabardian янэхъ "most":

Ady	Ар ащ нахь лъагэ	"He is taller than that one."
Kbd	Ар абы нэхъ лъагэщ	"He is taller than that one."
Ady	Ар пшъашъэмэ анахь дахэ	"She is the most beautiful of the girls."
Kbd	Ар пщащэмэ янэхъ дахэщ	"She is the most beautiful of the girls."

Size and age are marked by suffixes on the noun (Adyghe унакӀэ / Kabardian унащӀэ "new house", Adyghe унэжъы / Kabardian унэжь "old house", унэцӀыкӀу / унэцӀыкӀу "small house"), while a range of suffixes modify the degree of a quality:

Meaning	Ady suffix	Ady example	Kbd suffix	Kbd example
very	~дэд	дэгъудэд "very good"	~дэд	дэгъудэд "very good"
slightly	~Ӏо	дыджыӀо "slightly bitter"	~Ӏуэ	стырыӀуэ "slightly spicy"
too much	~щэ	дыджыщэ "too bitter"	~щэ	дыджыщэ "too bitter"
quite	~кӀай	дэгъукӀай "quite good"	~кӀей	дэгъукӀей "pretty good"
lacking	~нчъэ	акъылынчъэ "mindless"	~ншэ	акъылыншэ "mindless"

Adjectives also feed productive derivation. The suffix -гъэ turns them into abstract nouns of measure (кӀыхьэ/кӀыхь "long" → кӀыхьагъэ "length"; дахэ "beautiful" → дэхагъэ "beauty"), while -гъакӀэ forms nouns for the state or essence of a quality (дэхэгъакӀэ "(inherent) prettiness"). A prefix forms psychological predicates meaning "X is [adjective] to someone": Adyghe шӀо- (дахэ → шӀодах "it is beautiful to him/her"), Kabardian фӀэ- (дахэ → фӀэдах).

== Verbs ==
The verb is the most complex part of Circassian grammar. It is heavily agglutinative and polysynthetic, marking several persons (polypersonality), number, tense, mood, causative, and a wide range of preverbs through prefixes and suffixes.

=== Tenses ===
The two varieties share the core tenses (present, past, pluperfect, future, imperfect). Kabardian additionally draws finer distinctions in the future and in the anterior / "future-in-the-past" forms, for which Adyghe has no separate suffix (marked —). Forms are given for the verb "to go" (Adyghe кӀон, Kabardian кӀуэн).

Tense	Suffix		Example		Meaning
Tense	Ady	Kbd	Ady	Kbd	Meaning
Present	~(р)	~(р)	макӀо	макӀуэ	(s)he is going; (s)he goes
Preterite (past)	~гъэ	~ащ	кӀуагъэ	кӀуащ	(s)he went
Pluperfect	~гъагъэ	~гъащ	кӀуагъагъэ	кӀуэгъащ	(s)he went a long time ago
Categorical future	~щт	~нщ	кӀощт	кӀуэнщ	(s)he will go
Factual future	—	~нущ	—	кӀуэнущ	(s)he will go, is about to go
Imperfect	~щтыгъэ	~(р)т	кӀощтыгъэ	кӀуэ(р)т	(s)he was going
Anterior perfect (Perfect II)	—	~ат	—	кӀуат	(then) (s)he went
Anterior pluperfect	—	~гъат	—	кӀуэгъат	(then) (s)he went a long time ago
Future II categorical	—	~нт	—	кӀуэнт	(s)he was about to go / would go
Future II factual	—	~нут	—	кӀуэнут	(s)he was about to go / would go

=== Valency ===
Verb valency is the number of arguments controlled by a verbal predicate, closely related to transitivity: base intransitive verbs are monovalent and base transitive verbs are bivalent. Most operations in Circassian are valency-increasing, including the causative prefix and various preverbs. The causative gives:

Ady	ар мачъэ → ащ ар егъэчъэ	"he runs → he makes him run"
Kbd	ар мажэ → абы ар егъажэ	"he runs → he makes him run"
Ady	ар матхэ → ащ ар егъэтхэ	"he writes → he makes him write"
Kbd	ар матхэ → абы ар егъатхэ	"he writes → he makes him write"

Among the valency-decreasing operations is the reflexive person marker:

Ady	—	"he clothes you → he dresses (clothes himself)"
Kbd	абы уэ уехуапэ → абы зехуапэ	"he clothes you → he dresses (clothes himself)"
Ady	—	"the girl washed the dishes → the girl washed herself"
Kbd	хъыджэбзым хьэкъущыкъур итхьэщӀащ → хъыджэбзым зитхьэщӀащ	"the girl washed the dishes → the girl washed herself"

Common valency-increasing prefixes (illustrated on the verb "to look at", еплъын). The preverbs are identical in both varieties except the benefactive and malefactive:

Function	Prefix		Meaning	Example	
Function	Ady	Kbd	Meaning	Ady	Kbd
Causative	гъэ~ [ʁa~]		"to force, to make"	гъэплъэн "to make (someone) look"	
Comitative	дэ~ [da~]		"with"	деплъын "to look with"	
Benefactive	фэ~ [fa~]	хуэ~ [xʷa~]	"for"	фэплъын	хуеплъын "to look for"
Malefactive	шӀ~ [ʃʷʼa~]	фӀ~ [fʼa~]	"against one's interest"	шӀеплъын	фӀеплъын "to look to someone's detriment"
Reflexive	зэ~ [za~]		"self"	зэплъын "to look at oneself"	

=== Moods ===
==== Imperative ====
The imperative mood denotes a command and can only take a second-person subject. It is formed by stripping all tense suffixes from the verb, with the positive second-person singular not marking the subject; the negative is marked by мы-. The two varieties differ mainly in the second-person plural prefix (Adyghe шъу- / Kabardian ф-, в-):

Meaning	Lang	Infinitive	Singular		Plural	
Meaning	Lang	Infinitive	positive	negative	positive	negative
to go	Ady	кӀон	кӀо	умыкӀу	шъукӀу	шъумыкӀу
to go	Kbd	кӀуэн	кӀуэ	умыкӀуэ	фыкӀуэ	фымыкӀуэ
to write Y	Ady	тхын	тхы	умытхы	шъутхы	шъумытхы
to write Y	Kbd	тхын	тхы	умытх	фтхы	фымытх
to take Y	Ady	къэштэн	къэштэ	къэумыштэ	къэшъуштэ	къэшъумыштэ
to take Y	Kbd	къэщтэн	къэщтэ	къыумыщтэ	къэфщтэ	къэвмыщтэ

==== Other moods ====
- Conditional with the suffix -мэ: Adyghe сыкӀомэ / Kabardian сыкӀуэмэ "if I go".
- Concessive with the suffix -ми: Adyghe сыкӀоми / Kabardian сыкӀуэми "even if I go".
- Affirmative/interrogative with the affix -къэ: Adyghe кӀокъэ / Kabardian кӀуэкъэ "isn't he going?".

=== Positional conjugation ===
Both varieties have an extensive set of positional preverbs expressing location and the direction of an action. The forms below are given in Kabardian; Adyghe uses the same preverbs and the same verb formations, differing only by regular sound correspondences — notably Adyghe чӀэ~ (Kabardian щӀэ~) "under", къо~ (къуэ~) "behind", and кӀоцӀы~ (кӀуэцӀы~) "inside within". The first table shows how a preverb changes the indicated direction with two dynamic verbs, "looking" and "throwing":

Position	Prefix	Example	
Position	Prefix	Looking	Throwing
Body position/pose	щы~ [ɕə~]	щеплъэ "looking at that place"	щедзы "throwing at that place"
On	те~ [taj~]	теплъэ "looking on"	тедзэ "throwing at"
Under	щӀэ~ [ɕʼa~]	щӀаплъэ "looking under"	щӀедзэ "throwing under"
Through	хэ~ [xa~]	хаплъэ "looking through"	хедзэ "throwing through"
Within some area	дэ~ [da~]	даплъэ "looking at some area"	дедзэ "throwing at some area"
Inside an object	дэ~ [da~]	даплъэ "looking inside an object"	дедзэ "throwing inside an object"
Around	Ӏу~ [ʔʷə~]	Ӏуаплъэ "looking around"	Ӏуедзэ "throwing around"
Inside	и~ [jə~]	еплъэ "looking inside"	редзэ "throwing inside"
Hanged/attached	пы~ [pə~]	пэплъэ "searching by looking"	педзэ "hanging by throwing"
Behind	къуэ~ [qʷa~]	къуаплъэ "looking behind"	къуедзэ "throwing behind"
Aside	го~ [ɡʷa~]	гуаплъэ "looking aside"	гуедзэ "throwing aside"
Against	пэӀу~ [paʔʷə~]	пэӀуаплъэ "looking against"	пэӀуедзэ "throwing against"
Backwards	зэщӀ~ [zaɕʼ~]	зэщӀаплъэ "looking backwards"	зэщӀедзэ "throwing backwards"
Inside within	кӀуэцӀы~ [kʷʼat͡sʼə~]	кӀуэцӀаплъэ "looking within inside"	кӀуэцӀедзэ "throwing within inside"
Toward	кӀэлъы~ [kʲʼaɬə~]	кӀэлъэплъэ "looking toward"	кӀэлъедзы "throwing toward"
Past	блэ~ [bɮa~]	блэплъы "looking past"	бледзэ "throwing past"
Over	щхьэпыры~ [ɕħapərə~]	щхьэпырыплъы "looking over"	щхьэпыредзэ "throwing over"
Directly	жьэхэ~ [ʑaxa~]	жьэхаплъэ "glaring at one's face"	жьэхедзэ "throwing at one's face"
Mouth	жьэдэ~ [ʑada~]	жьэдаплъэ "looking at a mouth"	жьэдедзэ "throwing at a mouth"

Static position verbs change their root to indicate position:

	stands	sits	lies
Body position/pose	щыт	щыс	щылъ
On	тет	тес	телъ
Under	щӀэт	щӀэс	щӀэлъ
Among	хэт	хэс	хэлъ
Within some area	дэт	дэс	дэлъ
Behind	Ӏут	Ӏус	Ӏулъ
Inside	ит	ис	илъ
Hanged or attached	пыт	пыс	пылъ
Corner or behind	къуэт	къуэс	къуэлъ
Side	гуэт	гуэс	гуэлъ
In front of	пэӀут	пэӀус	пэӀулъ
Inside within	кӀуэцӀыт	кӀуэцӀыс	кӀуэцӀылъ
Slope	кӀэрыт	кӀэрыс	кӀэрылъ
Over	щхьэпырыт	щхьэпырыс	щхьэпырылъ
Directly	жьэхэт	жьэхэс	жьэхэлъ
Toward the mouth	жьэдэт	жьэдэс	жьэдэлъ

The contrast between these static roots can be seen by holding the meaning "stands" constant while varying the position prefix:

- щыт – [someone or something] stands (as a pose)
- Ӏут – stands (behind)
- щӀэт – stands (under)
- тет – stands (above)
- дэт – stands (between), etc.

== Adverbs ==
Circassian adverbs fall into four main groups: adverbs of place, of time, of quality (manner), and of amount (quantity).

=== Adverbs of place ===
Ady	Kbd	English
мыдэ		"here"
модэ		"there (visible)"
адэ		"there (invisible/far)"

Examples:

МодэкӀэ тучаныр Ӏут		"The shop is placed over there." (identical in both)
Ady	Адэ кӀалэр кӀуагъэ	"The boy went there."
Kbd	Адэ щӀалэр кӀуащ	"The boy went there."

=== Adverbs of time ===
Adyghe has a particularly rich set of time adverbs. The table aligns the two varieties by meaning; a shared form spans both columns, and a dash marks a form the source grammar does not supply for that variety:

Meaning	Ady	Kbd
today	непэ	нобэ
yesterday	тыгъуасэ	дыгъуасэ
the day before yesterday	тыгъуасэнахьыпэ	—
tomorrow	неущы	пщэдей
the day after tomorrow	неущмыкӀэ	—
all day long	непенэу	—
last year	гъэрекӀо	—
this year	мыгъэ	
next year	къакӀорэгъэ	—
now	джы	иджы
for now	джырэкӀэ	—
so far	джыкӀэ	—
right now	джыдэдэм	иджыпсту
until now	джынэс	—
still / again	джыри	иджыри
in the morning	пчэдыжьым	пщэдджыжьым
at noon	щэджагъом	шэджагъуэм
in the afternoon	щэджэгъоужым	—
in the evening	пчыхьэм	—
in the night	чэщым	жэщым
in the past	зэманым	
soon	тӀэкӀушӀэмэ	—
later	бэшӀэмэ	—
recently	тӀэкӀушӀагъэу	—
a long time ago	бэшӀагъэу	—
while	пэтырэу	—
afterwards	етӀанэ (етӀуанэ)	етӀанэ
early	пасэу	—
lately / late	кӀасэу	—
always	ренэу	—

Examples:

Ady	ТӀэкӀушӀэмэ тышхэнэу тыкӀощт.	"Soon we will go to eat."
Kbd	ТӀэкӀу дэкӀмэ дышхэну дыкӀуэнщ.	"Soon we will go to eat."
Ady	Непэ пасэу еджапӀэм тынэсышъугъ.	"Today we managed to reach school early."
Kbd	Нобэ пасэу еджапӀэм дынэсыфащ.	"Today we managed to reach school early."

=== Adverbs of amount ===
Ady	Kbd	English
макӀэ	мащӀэ	"few"
тӀэкӀу		"a bit"
тӀэкӀурэ		"a few times / for a short while"
бэ	куэд	"a lot"
бэрэ	куэдрэ	"a lot of times / for a long while"
Ӏаджэ		"many"
хъои	—	"plenty"
апӀэ	—	"a load of"
заулэ	зыбжанэ	"several"
сыдэу	сыту	"so, how (intensifier)"

Examples:

Ady	Шхыныр сыдэу фабэ.	"The food is so hot."
Kbd	Шхыныр сыту хуабэ.	"The food is so hot."
Ady	КӀалэм ахъщэ бэ иӀ.	"The boy has a lot of money."
Kbd	ЩӀалэм ахъщэ куэд иӀ.	"The boy has a lot of money."
Ady	Чэщым лӀыр тӀэкӀурэ макӀо.	"In the night, the man goes for a short while."
Kbd	Жэщым лӀыр тӀэкӀурэ макӀуэ.	"In the night, the man goes for a short while."

=== Adverbs of quality (manner) ===
Adverbs of manner describe how an action is performed and are productively formed from qualitative adjectives with the adverbial-case suffix Adyghe ~эу / Kabardian ~у (/~aw/, /~w/).

Meaning	Adjective		Adverb	
Meaning	Ady	Kbd	Ady	Kbd
clean	къабзэ		къабзэу	къабзу
far	чыжьэ	жыжьэ	чыжьэу	жыжьу
quick	псынкӀэ	псынщӀэ	псынкӀэу	псынщӀэу
beautiful	дахэ		дахэу	даху
near	благъэ		благъэу	благъу
strong/powerful	лъэш	лъэщ	лъэшэу	лъэщу
soft	шъабэ	щабэ	шъабэу	щабу
firm	пытэ	быдэ	пытэу	быду

Examples:

Ady	КӀалэр чыжьэу чъагъэ.	"The boy ran far."
Kbd	ЩӀалэр жыжьу жащ.	"The boy ran far."
Ady	КӀалэм шхыныр дэгъоу ышӀэгъ.	"The boy made the food excellently."
Kbd	ЩӀалэм шхыныр дэгъуу ищӀащ.	"The boy made the food excellently."
Ady	Пшъашъэр дахэу матхэ.	"The girl writes beautifully."
Kbd	Пщащэр даху матхэ.	"The girl writes beautifully."

=== Formation of adverbs ===
Beyond the manner suffix above, adverbs are derived from other parts of speech by three main methods (Adyghe):

1. Suffixing (adverbial case): adding ~эу to adjectives — дахэ "beautiful" → дахэу "beautifully"; шъабэ "soft" → шъабэу "softly"; пытэ "firm" → пытэу "firmly".
2. Concatenating (compounding): combining two words — неущ "tomorrow" + пчэдыжь "morning" → неущпчэдыжьы "tomorrow morning"; щэджагъу "noon" + уж "after" → щэджэгъоужым "afternoon".
3. Conversion (fossilized cases): nouns fixed in a case functioning as adverbs — пчыхьэм (evening-ERG/OBL) "in the evening"; лӀыгъэкӀэ (courage-INS) "forcibly, bravely".

Usage examples

Ady	Сэ дэгъоу сэ́джэ.	"I study well."
Kbd	Сэ дэгъуу соджэ.	"I study well."
Ady	ЛэжьакӀохэр пчэдыжьым жьэ́у къэтэджых.	"Workers get up early in the morning."
Kbd	ЛэжьакӀуэхэр пщэдджыжьым жьыуэ къотэджхэ.	"Workers get up early in the morning."

=== Adverbs of contrast ("rather", "actually") ===
The adverb Adyghe нахь /naːħ/ (Kabardian нэхъ) — the same word as the comparative particle "more" — also works adversatively, "rather" or "actually", correcting a statement or contradicting what the listener might assume. It follows the word it qualifies:

- Adyghe кӀуагъэ "he went" → кӀуагъэ нахь "rather, he went"
- Adyghe къины "hard" → къины нахь "rather, it is hard"
- Adyghe кӀалэ "boy" → кӀалэ нахь "rather, it is a boy"

Ady	КӀалэр кӀуагъэп, чъагъэ нахь.	"The boy didn't walk, rather he ran."
Kbd	ЩӀалэр кӀуакъым, жащ нэхъ.	"The boy didn't walk, rather he ran."
Ady	Фылымым теплъыгъэ нахь.	"We actually watched the film."
Kbd	Фильмым деплъащ нэхъ.	"We actually watched the film."

== Conjunctions ==
In English a single word "and" connects various parts of speech. In Circassian there are different suffixes for "and" depending on the part of speech and definiteness. The two varieties pattern alike, except that Kabardian uses -ри/-мри for adjectives where Adyghe uses -рэ/-мрэ:

Category	Suffix		Example		English
Category	Ady	Kbd	Ady	Kbd	English
Indefinite nouns	-рэ		КӀалэ-рэ пшъашъэ-рэ къэкӀуагъэх.	ЩӀалэ-рэ пщащэ-рэ къэкӀуахэщ.	"A boy and a girl came."
Definite nouns	-мрэ		КӀалэ-мрэ пшъашъэ-мрэ кӀуагъэх.	ЩӀалэ-мрэ пщащэ-мрэ къэкӀуахэщ.	"The boy and the girl came."
Pronouns	-рэ		Сэ-рэ о-рэ тыкӀуагъ.	Сэ-рэ уэ-рэ дыкӀуащ.	"You and I went."
Indefinite adjectives	-рэ	-ри	КӀэлэ кӀыхьэ-рэ пшъашъэ дахэ-рэ къэкӀуагъэх.	ЩӀалэ кӀыхьэ-ри пщащэ дахэ-ри къэкӀуахэщ.	"A tall boy and a pretty girl came."
Definite adjectives	-мрэ	-мри	КӀэлэ кӀыхьэ-мрэ пшъашъэ дахэ-мрэ къэкӀуагъэх.	ЩӀалэ кӀыхьэ-мри пщащэ дахэ-мри къэкӀуахэщ.	"The tall boy and the pretty girl came."
Numbers	-рэ		КӀэлэ тӀу-рэ пшъашъэ щы-рэ къэкӀуагъэх.	ЩӀалэ тӀу-рэ пщащэ щы-рэ къэкӀуахэщ.	"Two boys and three girls came."
Universal nouns	-и		КӀал-и пшъашъ-и къэкӀуагъэх.	ЩӀал-и пщащ-и къэкӀуахэщ.	"Boys and girls came."
Adverbs	-мкӀи		Мафэ-мкӀи чэщы-мкӀи къэкӀуагъэх.	Махуэ-мкӀи жэщы-мкӀи къэкӀуахэщ.	"They came in the day and in the night."

The independent conjunction ыкӀи /ət͡ʃəj/ "and" can also connect different parts of speech, e.g. Adyghe КӀалэр еджэ ыкӀи матхэ. "The boy reads and writes."

=== Simple conjunctions ===
- "and": ыкӀи
- "or": е
- "but": Adyghe ау / Kabardian ауэ

Ady	Kbd	English
Сэ скӀуагъ къалэм, ау къэзгъэзэжьыгъэп.	Сэ сыкӀуащ къалэм, ауэ къэзгъэзэжакъым.	"I went to the city, but I haven't returned."
Сэ непенэу сэлажьэ ыкӀи сычъыягъэп тыгъуасэ чэщым.	Сэ махуэ псом солажьэ ыкӀи дыгъуасэ жэщым сыжеякъым.	"I have been working this whole day and I haven't slept yesterday night."

=== Complex conjunctions ===
According to their structure, Circassian conjunctions fall into simple and complex groups. The complex conjunctions differ considerably between the two varieties.

The complex conjunctions largely differ between the two varieties; they are aligned here by meaning (a dash marks a meaning not filled by a distinct conjunction in that variety):

Ady	Kbd	English
сыда пӀомэ	арщхьэкӀэ, сыт щхьэкӀэ	"because"
ащ къыхэкӀыкӀэ	къыхэкӀкӀэ	"due to / that's why"
ау щытми, ащ шъхьакӀэ	—	"however"
ары шъхьай	—	"but"
нахь мышӀэми	атӀэ	"despite / in spite of"
ары пакӀопышъ	—	"not only, but"
арти	—	"so"
армэ (аущтэумэ)	—	"if so"
арми (аущтэуми)	—	"even if so"
армырмэ	—	"if not, otherwise"
армырми	—	"even if not, either way"
сыдигъокӀи	—	"in any case"
сыдми	—	"either way"
—	хьэмэ	"or"
—	сыту, папщӀэкӀэ	"as"
—	щхьэкӀэ	"though"
—	папщӀэ	"for"
—	щыгъуэ	"when"
—	къудейуэ	"as soon as"
—	ару	"just"
—	пэтми	"although"
—	щытмэ	"if"
—	ипкъ иткӀэ	"therefore"
зэ-зэ	зэ-зэ	Ady "here-and-there"; Kbd "first…then"
е-е		"either-or"

Ady	Kbd	English
Унэм тигъэс, сыда пӀомэ непэ къещхыщт.	Унэм дис, сыту жыпӀэмэ нобэ къешхынущ.	"Let us stay inside the house, because today it will rain."
Армэ, неущы къычӀегъэдзагъэу седжэу сыублэщт экзамыным фэшӀыкӀэ.	Апхуэдэу щытмэ, пщэдей щегъэжьауэ экзаменым сыхуеджэн щӀэздзэнущ.	"If that so, I will start studying for the exam starting from tomorrow."

== Particles ==
Particles vary in both meaning and structure. Semantically they fall into groups such as affirmative, negative, interrogative, intensive, indicatory, and stimulating.

The two varieties have partly different particle inventories; they are aligned here by meaning:

Ady	Kbd	English
ары	нтӀэ, ары	"yes"
хьау	хьэуэ	"no"
хъун, хъущт	—	"fine, OK"
адэ	—	"of course; well"
кӀо	—	"well, so"
шӀуа	пӀэрэ	"perhaps, I wonder"
мары	мис	"this is it / here"
моры	мес	"that is it / there (nearby)"
еу	—	"come on"
нахь	нэхъ	"more"
нахьи	нэхърэ	"more than"
—	дыдэ	"quite, very"
—	уеблэмэ	"even"
—	кхъыӀэ	"please"
—	акъудей (аркъудей)	"quite not"
—	къудей	"just now"

=== Usage examples ===
The following examples illustrate the particles in context. Several particles are specific to Adyghe and have no direct Kabardian counterpart (marked —).

Category	Ady	Kbd	English
Affirmative	— Непэ тадэжь къакӀоба. — Хъун.	— Нобэ дадэжь къакӀуэ. — Хъунщ.	"— Come to us today. — OK."
Affirmative	— КъэсӀуагъэр къыбгурыӀуагъа? — Ары.	— ЖысӀар къыбгурыӀуа? — Ары.	"— Have you understood what I said? — Yes."
Affirmative	Адэ, непэ тыдэкӀыни тыкъэшхэщт.	—	"Certainly, we will go out today and eat."
Negative	Хьау, хьау, зыми сэ сыфаеп.	Хьэуэ, хьэуэ, зыри сэ сыхуейкъым.	"No, no, I don't want a thing."
Interrogative	Сыдигъо шӀуа автобусыр къызыкӀощтыр?	Сыт щыгъуэ пӀэрэ автобусыр къэкӀуэнур?	"When perhaps will the bus come?"
Intensive	Адэ, Пщымаф, гущыӀэу птыгъэр пгъэцэкӀэжьын фай.	—	"Well, Pshimaf, you must keep your word."
Intensive	КӀо, кӀалэр еджэн фаи къытдэкӀышъугъэп.	—	"Well, because the boy needs to study he couldn't come out with us."
Indicatory	Мары машинэу зигугъу къыпфэсшӀыгъагъэр.	Мис зи гугъу пхуэсщӀа машинэр.	"This is the car which I have told you about."
Stimulating	Еу, псынкӀэу зегъахь!	—	"Come on, get out of here quickly!"

=== Other interjections and fillers ===
These fillers are specific to Adyghe (Kabardian has no direct counterpart, marked —):

Particle	Function / Meaning	Ady example	Kbd	English
ашъыу	Self-correction ("er", "I mean")	Уатэр къэсфэхь, Ашъыу, отычэр къэсфэхь.	—	"Bring me the hammer, er, I mean, bring me the axe."
ашъыу	Annoyance ("argh", "ugh")	Ашъыу!, зэ щыгъэт.	—	"Ugh!, shut up for a moment."
хъугъэ	Giving up ("that's enough")	Хъугъэ!, некӀо тыкӀожьыщт.	—	"That's enough!, let's return."
еоой	Lament ("alas")	Еоой, идж сыд цӀыфым ышӀэжьыщтэр?	—	"Alas, what will the person do now?"

== Postpositions ==
In Circassian, as in other Ibero-Caucasian languages, the role of prepositions belongs to postpositions. The exact count is hard to define, because even nouns and some verb prefixes can function as postpositions. For example, in Тхылъыр столым телъ "The book is lying on the table", the noun has no preposition, but the verb prefix те- in те-лъ "is lying" expresses something's being on a surface, so the verb literally means "on the surface is lying".

Nouns describing parts of the human body (head, nose, side, etc.) often function as postpositions. In the example below "in front of" is expressed by the phrase "being in front of his nose":

Ady	Шъузыр лӀым ыпэ итэу кӀощтыгъэ	"The wife went in front of the husband."
Kbd	Фызыр лӀым ипэ иту кӀуащ	"The wife went in front of the husband."

Nouns and pronouns combine with a postposition only in the ergative case. For example, the postposition Adyghe дэжь / Kabardian деж "near, beside" requires a word in the ergative:

Ady	Kbd	English
чъыгы-м дэжь	жыгы-м деж	"near the tree"
ныбджэгъу-м пае	ныбжьэгъу-м папщӀэ	"for the friend"

Postpositions can also attach possessive prefixes to themselves. The two languages inflect them alike:

Person	"near …"	
Person	Ady	Kbd
1st singular ("near me")	с-а-дэжь	с-а-деж
2nd singular ("near you")	у-а-дэжь	у-а-деж
3rd singular ("near him")	ы-дэжь	и деж
1st plural ("near us")	т-а-дэжь	д-а-деж
2nd plural ("near you")	шъу-а-дэжь	ф-а-деж
3rd plural ("near them")	а-дэжь	я деж

The following words are used as postpositions. Forms are aligned by meaning; a dash marks a meaning not supplied by the source grammar for that variety:

Meaning	Ady	Kbd
near	дэжь	деж
at	—	дежкӀэ
for	пае	—
in front of	пашъхьэ	пащхьэ
before	пашъхьэ	ипӀэкӀэ, пщӀондэ
under	чӀэгъ	щӀагъ
above	шъхьагъ	—
behind / back	кӀыб	щӀыбагъ
inside	кӀоцӀы	икӀуэцӀкӀ
like, similar	фэдэу	—
between	азыфагу	—
middle	гузэгу	—
side	бгъу	—
face	гупэ	—
corner	къогъу	—
surface	кӀыӀу	—
nose	пэ	—
neck	пшъэ	—
trace	ужы	—
track	нэуж	—
place	чӀыпӀэ	—
until	—	нэс, къэскӀэ
after	—	иужь
during	—	щыгъуэ
since	—	лъандэ
except	—	нэмыщӀ, фӀэкӀа
every	—	къэс

== Interrogatives ==
The suffix ~a /aː/ forms the interrogative particle that marks a yes/no question. The paradigm below is Adyghe; Kabardian marks polar questions differently and is not described in the source, so its cells are left blank:

Ady	Kbd	English
макӀо → макӀуа?	—	"(s)he is going → is (s)he going?"
кӀалэ → кӀала?	—	"boy → is it a boy?"
дахэ → даха?	—	"beautiful → is (s)he beautiful?"

Because word order is free, the particle attaches to whichever word is being questioned, shifting the focus. When the questioned word carries the negative suffix ~п, the particle becomes ~ба, the negative interrogative:

Ady	Kbd	English
КӀала Ӏаным тесыр?	—	"Is it a boy that sits on the table?"
КӀалэр Ӏаным теса?	—	"Is the boy sitting on the table?"
КӀалэр Ӏана зытесыр?	—	"Is it a table the boy is sitting on?"
КӀалэба Ӏаным тесыр?	—	"Isn't it a boy that sits on the table?"
КӀалэр Ӏаным тесыба?	—	"Isn't the boy sitting on the table?"
КӀалэр Ӏанэба зытесыр?	—	"Isn't it a table the boy is sitting on?"

Yes/no questions can also be posed with auxiliary interrogative words (Adyghe dialectal variants in parentheses):

Ady	Kbd	English
хэт (хэта)	хэт	"who"
сыд (шъыд)	сыт	"what / which"
сыда (шъыда)	сыт щхьэкӀэ	"why"
тыдэ	дэнэ	"where"
тхьэпш	дапщэ	"how much"
сыд фэдиз	сыт хуэдиз	"how much"
тэущтэу (сыдэущтэу)	дауэ	"how"
тары	дэтхэнэ	"which"
сыдигъу (шъыдгъо)	сыт щыгъуэ	"when"
сыдкӀэ (шъыдкӀэ)	сыткӀэ	"with what"
сыд фэд?	сыт хуэдэ?	"what kind of?"

Examples:

Ady	Хэт къэкӀуагъэ?	"Who came?"
Kbd	Хэт къэкӀуар?	"Who came?"
Ady	Сыд кӀалэм ыцӀэ?	"What is the boy's name?"
Kbd	Сыт щӀалэм и цӀэр?	"What is the boy's name?"
Ady	Непэ тыдэ ущыӀэщт?	"Where will you be today?"
Kbd	Нобэ дэнэ ущыӀэну?	"Where will you be today?"

== Syntax ==
Word order in a Circassian sentence is generally free, but verb-final order is the most typical. The structure of a full sentence is usually defined by the verb form. There are several sentence types:

1. Nominative (intransitive) sentence: subject in the absolutive, intransitive verb, no direct object.
2. Ergative sentence: subject in the ergative, direct object in the absolutive, transitive verb.
3. Zero-subject sentence: the subject is in the zero form; both transitive and intransitive verbs may occur (rarer than the first two).

Ady	Трактористыр пасэу къэтэджыгъ	"The tractor-driver got up early." (verb-final)
Kbd	Тракторисыр пасэу къэтэджащ	"The tractor-driver got up early." (verb-final)
Ady	Гъатхэ́р къэсыгъ, чъыгхэр къызэӀуихыхэу ригъэжъагъ	"Spring has come, the trees have started to bloom." (nominative)
Kbd	Гъатхэр къэсащ, жыгхэр къызэӀуихыу щӀидзащ	"Spring has come, the trees have started to bloom." (nominative)
Ady	Агрономым губгъохэ́р къыплъахьыгъэх	"The agronomist has reviewed the fields." (ergative)
Kbd	Агрономым губгъуэхэр къиплъыхьащ	"The agronomist has reviewed the fields." (ergative)
Ady	Нанэ тхъу къыситыгъ	"Mother gave me some butter." (zero-subject)
Kbd	Нанэ тхъу къызитащ	"Mother gave me some butter." (zero-subject)
Ady	КӀэлэ тэрэз ащ фэдэу псэурэ́п	"A good guy does not behave like that." (zero-subject)
Kbd	ЩӀалэ гъэса апхуэдэу псэуркъым	"A good guy does not behave like that." (zero-subject)

Compound sentences may consist of independent parts only, or of a main part with dependent subparts:

Ady	Нэф къэшъыгъ, ау цӀыфхэр джыри урамхэм къатехьагъэхэ́п	"The morning has already come, but the people have not appeared on the streets yet." (independent)
Kbd	Нэху къэщащ, ауэ цӀыхухэр иджыри уэрамхэм къытехьакъым	"The morning has already come, but the people have not appeared on the streets yet." (independent)
Ady	ЗэкӀэ́ къалэ́м къикӀыжьыгъэх, ау ежь Ибрахьимэ Ӏофхэр иӀэу къэуцугъ	"Everybody has returned from the city, but Ibrahim has stayed because of his affairs." (independent)
Kbd	Псори къалэм къикӀыжащ, ауэ езы Ибрахьим Ӏуэхухэр иӀэу къэнащ	"Everybody has returned from the city, but Ibrahim has stayed because of his affairs." (independent)
Ady	Мэзэ́ псау́м ащ Ӏоф ышӀагъэ́п, сыда пӀомэ дэсыгъэпы́шъ ары́	"He has not worked for the whole month, because he has been away." (dependent)
Kbd	Мазэ псом абы Ӏуэху ищӀакъым, сыту жыпӀэмэ дэсакъыми аращ	"He has not worked for the whole month, because he has been away." (dependent)

== Word formation ==
Both Adyghe and Kabardian build new words by the same productive processes of compounding and derivation. The examples below are given in Kabardian; Adyghe uses the same patterns with its own regular sound shapes (e.g. Kabardian щӀэн "to do" = Adyghe шӀэн, Kabardian кӀуэн "to go" = Adyghe кӀон).

=== Compounding ===
Noun + noun: адэ-анэ "parents" (cf. адэ "father", анэ "mother"); джэдкъаз "domesticated bird" (cf. джэд "chicken", къэз "goose"); мэкъумэш "harvest" (cf. мэкъу "hay", мэш "millet"); джанэгъуэншэдж "set of clothes" (cf. джанэ "shirt", гъуэншэдж "pants").

Noun + verb (similar to English pickpocket, scarecrow): пхъащӀэ "carpenter" (cf. пхъэ "wood", щӀэн "to do Y"); псышэ "water carrier" (cf. псы "water", шэн "to lead Y").

=== Derivation ===
- -ей (denoting a tree): дей "walnut/hazelnut tree" (cf. дэ "nut"); абрикосей "apricot tree" (cf. абрикос "apricot"); балией "cherry tree" (cf. балий "cherry").
- зэ- (reciprocal/paired relations): зэадэзэкъуэ "father and son"; зэанэзэпхъу "mother and daughter"; зэдэлъхузэшыпхъу "brother and sister"; зэлӀзэфыз "husband and wife"; зэныбжьэгъу "friends".
- -тэ (unproductive, creating verbs from verbs): лъэтэн "to fly" (cf. лъэн "to jump"); кӀуэтэн "to move" (cf. кӀуэн "to go"); къутэн "to break Y" (cf. къун "to beat Y up").

== Numbers ==
Adyghe (West Circassian) and Kabardian (East Circassian) share their numeral system almost entirely. Of the basic digits only "five" and "ten" differ noticeably (Adyghe тфы/пшӀы vs. Kabardian тху/пщӀы). The two languages diverge mainly in the formation of the tens, where standard Adyghe keeps an older vigesimal count and standard Kabardian has generalised a newer decimal one.

=== Cardinal numbers ===
==== Zero to ten ====
Numbers from zero to ten are individual words:

Value	Ady	Kbd	IPA
0	зиӀ	—	[ziʔ]
1	зы		[zə]
2	тӀу		[tʷʼə]
3	щы		[ɕə]
4	плӀы		[pɬʼə]
5	тфы	тху	[tfə] / [txʷə]
6	хы		[xə]
7	блы		[blə] / [bɮə]
8	и		[jə]
9	бгъу		[bʁʷə]
10	пшӀы	пщӀы	[pʃʼə] / [pɕʼə]

==== Eleven to twenty ====
Numbers from eleven to nineteen are built from the word for ten, followed by кӀу ([kʷʼə]) and the unit digit, e.g. Adyghe пшӀыкӀузы / Kabardian пщӀыкӀузы "11". The two languages differ only in the shape of "five" (Adyghe тф vs. Kabardian тху). In running speech the final ~ы of "11" may drop (пшӀыкӀуз), but the citation form keeps it.

Value	Ady	IPA	Kbd
11	пшӀыкӀузы	[pʃʼəkʷʼəzə]	пщӀыкӀузы
12	пшӀыкӀутӀу	[pʃʼəkʷʼətʷʼə]	пщӀыкӀутӀу
13	пшӀыкӀущы	[pʃʼəkʷʼəɕə]	пщӀыкӀущы
14	пшӀыкӀуплӀы	[pʃʼəkʷʼəpɬʼə]	пщӀыкӀуплӀы
15	пшӀыкӀутфы	[pʃʼəkʷʼətfə]	пщӀыкӀутху
16	пшӀыкӀухы	[pʃʼəkʷʼəxə]	пщӀыкӀухы
17	пшӀыкӀублы	[pʃʼəkʷʼəblə]	пщӀыкӀублы
18	пшӀыкӀуи	[pʃʼəkʷʼəjə]	пщӀыкӀуи
19	пшӀыкӀубгъу	[pʃʼəkʷʼəbʁʷə]	пщӀыкӀубгъу
20	тӀокӀы	[tʷʼat͡ʃʼə]	тӀощӀ

==== The tens ====
The tens are built in two ways, both inherited within Circassian. The older layer is vigesimal (base-20): the decades above thirty are counted in scores (twenties), with fifty set apart as a "half-hundred". The newer layer is decimal (base-10), giving each ten its own "digit + ten" word. Both languages form twenty and thirty on the decimal pattern (Adyghe тӀокӀы / Kabardian тӀощӀ "20"; Adyghe щэкӀы / Kabardian щэщӀ "30"), but they diverge from forty up: standard Adyghe keeps the vigesimal forms, whereas standard Kabardian has generalised the decimal ones.

In the decimal forms the digit that precedes the ten-marker appears in its combining shape, with the digit's final ~ы fronting to ~э (плӀы → плӀэ, тфы/тху → тфэ/тхуэ, хы → хэ, блы → блэ), "eight" appearing as е~ (и → е~), and "nine" rounding to бгъо~ in Adyghe (бгъу → бгъо~).

Structurally, in the vigesimal columns the decades from forty are multiples of twenty — $40 = 20 \times 2$, $60 = 20 \times 3$, $80 = 20 \times 4$ — with seventy and ninety adding a further ten ($20 \times 3 + 10$, $20 \times 4 + 10$) and fifty supplied by a separate "half-hundred" word, whereas in the decimal columns each decade is simply the digit times ten ($40 = 4 \times 10$ … $90 = 9 \times 10$). Twenty and thirty coincide in the two systems, being decimal in form ($2 \times 10$, $3 \times 10$) but also serving as the base of the vigesimal count.

The grid gives both systems in both languages. Forms that the standard language does not normally use, and which the source grammars do not attest, are reconstructed by regular analogy and marked with an asterisk (*).

The tens in the vigesimal and decimal systems
Value	Ady		Kbd	
Value	Vigesimal	Decimal	Vigesimal	Decimal
20	тӀокӀы		тӀощӀ	
30	щэкӀы		щэщӀ	
40	тӀокӀитӀу	плӀэкӀы*	тӀощӀитӀу*	плӀэщӀ
50	шъэныкъо	тфэкӀы*	щэныкъуэ*	тхуэщӀ
60	тӀокӀищ	хэкӀы*	тӀощӀищ*	хэщӀ
70	тӀокӀищырэ пшӀырэ	блэкӀы*	тӀощӀищэ пщӀырэ*	блэщӀ
80	тӀокӀиплӀ	екӀы*	тӀощӀиплӀ*	ещӀ
90	тӀокӀиплӀырэ пшӀырэ	бгъокӀы*	тӀощӀиплӀэ пщӀырэ*	бгъуэщӀ

The decimal forms follow the attested decade marker of each language — Adyghe -кӀы (as in тӀокӀы "20", щэкӀы "30") and Kabardian -щӀ (as in тӀощӀ "20", щэщӀ "30"). The reconstructed Kabardian vigesimal forms build score-multiples on тӀощӀ "20" parallel to Adyghe тӀокӀитӀу; their compound seventy and ninety join their parts on the native connective pattern seen in тӀощӀэ зырэ "21" — the tens word in -э and the added ten in -рэ (тӀощӀищэ пщӀырэ "70") — rather than the Adyghe double -ырэ. In actual use, standard Adyghe takes the vigesimal column for 40–90 and standard Kabardian the decimal column.

==== Vigesimal compounds ====
In the vigesimal system a decade is a multiple of twenty, fifty is a separate "half-hundred" word (Adyghe шъэныкъо), and an intermediate number adds a remainder, with the score-word and the remainder each taking the connective -рэ. The remainder itself may be a teen (11–19), so that e.g. "95" contains "fifteen". The following examples use Adyghe:

Value	Decomposition	Ady (vigesimal)
21	$20 + 1$	тӀокӀырэ зырэ
25	$20 + 5$	тӀокӀырэ тфырэ
35	$20 + 15$	тӀокӀырэ пшӀыкӀутфырэ
42	$20 \times 2 + 2$	тӀокӀитӀурэ тӀурэ
58	$50 + 8$	шъэныкъорэ ирэ
66	$20 \times 3 + 6$	тӀокӀищырэ хырэ
70	$20 \times 3 + 10$	тӀокӀищырэ пшӀырэ
77	$20 \times 3 + 17$	тӀокӀищырэ пшӀыкӀублырэ
80	$20 \times 4$	тӀокӀиплӀ
95	$20 \times 4 + 15$	тӀокӀиплӀырэ пшӀыкӀутфырэ
99	$20 \times 4 + 19$	тӀокӀиплӀырэ пшӀыкӀубгъурэ

==== Hundreds and thousands ====
One hundred is Adyghe шъэ / Kabardian щэ; one thousand is мин in both. Higher hundreds and thousands are formed by the root plus -и- and the multiplier digit. When composed into a larger numeral, the hundred word takes the -рэ suffix, as do any tens and units (e.g. Adyghe шъэрэ зырэ "101").

Value	Ady	Kbd
100	шъэ	щэ
200	шъитӀу	щитӀу
300	шъищ	щищ
101	шъэрэ зырэ	щэрэ зырэ
1,000	мин	
2,000	минитӀу	

==== Counting nouns ====
When counting a definite quantity of a noun, the noun is followed by -и- and the multiplier digit root:

Quantity	Ady	Gloss
1	зы кӀалэ	"one boy"
2	кӀалитӀу	"two boys"
3	кӀалищ	"three boys"
100	кӀалишъэ	"100 boys"

=== Ordinal numbers ===
Apart from "first" (Adyghe япэрэ, Kabardian япэ), Adyghe ordinals are formed with the prefix я- (jaː-) and the suffix -нэрэ (-nara). Kabardian uses related forms with the prefix е- and the suffix -анэ. Forms beyond those given in the source grammars are reconstructed by regular analogy and marked with an asterisk (*).

Value	Ady	Kbd
1st	япэрэ	япэ
2nd	ятӀунэрэ	етӀуанэ
3rd	ящынэрэ	ещанэ
4th	яплӀынэрэ	еплӀанэ*
5th	ятфынэрэ	етхуанэ*
6th	яхынэрэ	еханэ*
7th	яблынэрэ	ебланэ*
8th	яинэрэ	еянэ*
9th	ябгъунэрэ	ебгъуанэ*
10th	япшӀынэрэ	епщӀанэ*

=== Multiplicative numbers ===
Multiplicative ("how many times") numerals are formed by replacing a cardinal's final ~ы with ~эрэ. The same numerals can also express a share or measure of duration, using псау "whole", ренэ "whole (of a span of time)", and ныкъо "half".

Value	Ady	Gloss
3×	щэрэ	"three times"
4×	плӀэрэ	"four times"
5×	тфэрэ	"five times"
6×	хэрэ	"six times"
7×	блэрэ	"seven times"
10×	пшӀэрэ	"ten times"

Example: О плӀэрэ къыосӀогъах — "I have already told you four times."

=== Fractional numbers ===
Fractional numerals are formed from cardinals with the morpheme -(а)нэ /aːna/. "Half" is Adyghe ныкъо / Kabardian ныкъуэ.

Fraction	Cardinal	Ady	Gloss
½	—	ныкъо	"half"
⅓	щы "3"	щанэ	"third"
¼	плӀы "4"	плӀанэ	"fourth"
⅕	тфы "5"	тфанэ	"fifth"
⅙	хы "6"	ханэ	"sixth"
1/7	блы "7"	бланэ	"seventh"
1/10	пшӀы "10"	пшӀанэ	"tenth"

=== Separative numbers ===
Separative ("by …") numerals are formed by repeating the cardinal with the morpheme -ры /-rə/.

Ady	Gloss
зырыз	"by ones"
тӀурытӀу	"by twos"
щырыщ	"by threes"
плӀырыплӀ	"by fours"
тфырытф	"by fives"
хырых	"by sixes"

Example: ЕджакӀохэр экзаменым тӀурытӀоу чӀахьэщтыгъэх — "Pupils entered the examination room by twos."

=== Approximate numbers ===
Approximate numerals are formed as a combination of two adjacent cardinals built around the numeral зы "one".

Ady	Gloss
зытӀущ	"about two or three"
зыщыплӀ	"about three or four"
зыплӀытф	"about four or five"
зытфых	"about five or six"
зыхыбл	"about six or seven"

Example: Непэ садэжь нэбгырэ зытӀущ къыӀухьагъ — "About two or three people approached me today."

== See also ==
- Circassian languages
- Adyghe language
- Kabardian language
- Circassian verb transitivity
- Circassia
- Circassians
- Northwest Caucasian languages
