= Circassian verb transitivity =

Verbs in Circassian languages can be distinguished between transitivity (intransitive, transitive and ditransitive), and valency (monovalent, bivalent and trivalent).

== Transitivity and valency ==
Verbs in Circassian languages, encompassing both the Adyghe and Kabardian language, can be ditransitive, transitive or intransitive. Depending on their valency (the number of arguments they require), they are categorized into the following main types:

- Monovalent Intransitive Verbs
- Bivalent Intransitive Verbs
- Bivalent Transitive Verbs
- Trivalent Ditransitive Verbs

A fundamental rule of Circassian grammar is that a verb can contain at most three arguments: one Absolutive, one Ergative, and one Oblique.

There are also special cases like Labile (Ambitransitive) Verbs, where the direct object of its transitive use corresponds to the subject of its intransitive use, and Causative Verbs, which increase valency by turning an intransitive verb into a transitive one or a bivalent transitive into a trivalent one.

=== Monovalent Intransitive Verbs ===
In a sentence with a monovalent intransitive verb, there is no direct object, and the real subject is usually expressed by a noun in the absolutive case (marked as -р).

Sentence	Gloss	Function	Translation
Ady: Чэмахъор щыт Kbd: Жэмахъуэр щыт	Cowherd-ABS stands	S VERB	"The cowherd is standing (there)."
Ady: ПэсакӀор макӀо; Kbd: ПэсакӀуэр макӀуэ	Guard-ABS goes	S VERB	"The security guard is going."
Ady: ЛӀыр мэчъые Kbd: ЛӀыр мэжей	Man-ABS sleeps	S VERB	"The man is sleeping."

=== Bivalent Intransitive Verbs (Intransitive with Indirect Objects) ===
In the Circassian language, intransitive verbs can have indirect objects. The subject is in the absolutive case (-р), while the indirect objects are expressed by a noun in the oblique case (which is marked as -м).

Sentence	Gloss	Function	Translation
Ady: КӀалэр пшъашъэм ебэу Kbd: ЩӀалэр пщащэм йобэу	Boy-ABS girl-OBL kisses	S IO VERB	"The boy kisses the girl."
Ady: ЛӀыр чъыгым чӀэлъ; Kbd: ЛӀыр жыгым щӀэлъщ	Man-ABS tree-OBL lies-under	S IO VERB	"The man lays under the tree."
Ady: КӀалэр тхылъым еджэ Kbd: ЩӀалэр тхылъым йоджэ	Boy-ABS book-OBL reads	S IO VERB	"The boy reads the book."

=== Bivalent Transitive Verbs ===
In a sentence with a bivalent transitive verb, the noun in the subject's position is in the ergative case (marked as -м), and the noun in the direct object's position is in the absolutive case (marked as -р).

Sentence	Gloss	Function	Translation
Ady: КӀалэм письмэр етхы Kbd: ЩӀалэм письмор етх	Boy-ERG letter-ABS writes	A O VERB	"The boy is writing the letter."
Ady: ПхъашӀэм уатэр къыштагъ Kbd: ПхъащӀэм уадэр къэщтащ	Carpenter-ERG hammer-ABS took	A O VERB	"The carpenter took the hammer."
Ady: Хьэм тхьакӀумкӀыхьэр къыубытыгъ Kbd: Хьэм тхьакIумкӀыхьыр къиубыдащ	Dog-ERG rabbit/hare-ABS caught	A O VERB	"The dog has caught the rabbit/hare."

=== Trivalent Ditransitive Verbs ===
Trivalent Ditransitive verbs involve three participants: a subject (Agent), a direct object (Theme), and an indirect object (Recipient/Goal). The subject is in the ergative case (-м), the direct object is in the absolutive case (-р), and the indirect object is in the oblique case (-м).

Sentence	Gloss	Function	Translation
Ady: КӀалэм мыӀэрысэр пшъашъэм реты Kbd: ЩӀалэм мыӀэрысэр пщащэм ирет	Boy-ERG apple-ABS girl-OBL gives	A O IO VERB	"The boy gives the apple to the girl."
Ady: ЛӀым мыжъор хым хедзэ Kbd: ЛӀым мывэр хым хедзэ	Man-ERG rock-ABS sea-OBL throws-into	A O IO VERB	"The man throws the rock into the sea."
Ady: Бысымым хъугъэ къэбарэр хьакӀэм риӀуагъ; Kbd: Бысымым хъуа къэбарыр хьэщӀэм жриӀащ	Host-ERG happened news-ABS guest-OBL told	A O IO VERB	"The host told the news of what happened to the guest."

== Active and Antipassive Voice ==
Circassian monovalent intransitive verbs are not all alike in their voice properties. They are divided into two distinct types based on their semantic role and morphological pattern: active monovalent intransitive verbs and antipassive monovalent intransitive verbs. Understanding this distinction is essential for predicting how a verb will behave when its valency increases.

The core distinction is as follows: active intransitive verbs always have the patient/undergoer in the absolutive case, while antipassive verbs always have the actor/agent in the absolutive case. When a verb theoretically has all three forms, the pattern is:

Theoretical Three-Form Pattern
Voice	Argument Structure
Active Intransitive	Patient-ABS
Active Transitive	Actor-ERG, Patient-ABS
Antipassive	Actor-ABS

This same principle applies when an antipassive monovalent verb shifts to a bivalent intransitive: the actor remains in the absolutive and a new oblique participant is introduced, rather than the actor being demoted:

Antipassive to Bivalent Intransitive Pattern
Form	Argument Structure
Antipassive Monovalent	Actor-ABS
Bivalent Intransitive	Actor-ABS, Patient/Theme-OBL

=== Alignment Comparison: Passives and Antipassives ===
To understand the mirror-image nature of these alignments, it helps to look at how each system reduces a transitive sentence.

In a Nominative-Accusative language like English, the default focus is on the agent. To drop the object, an intransitive verb is used. To drop the agent, the language must use a passive construction.

- Active Transitive: The boy cleans the house.
- Active Intransitive: The boy cleans. (Object dropped)
- Passive Intransitive: The house is being cleaned. (Agent dropped)

In an Ergative-Absolutive language like Adyghe, the focus shifts depending on whether the action involves an object. When a transitive verb is reduced to an intransitive form, the result can be either an active intransitive (where the patient/undergoer becomes the absolutive subject) or an antipassive (where the agent becomes the absolutive subject and the object is dropped):

The "Clean" Root (укъэбзын)
Voice	Circassian Example	Gloss	Translation
Active Transitive	КӀалэм унэр еукъэбзы.	Boy-ERG house-ABS cleans	"The boy cleans the house."
Active Intransitive	Унэр мэукъэбзы.	House-ABS cleans	"The house becomes clean." (Agent dropped)
Antipassive Intransitive	КӀалэр мэукъабзэ.	Boy-ABS cleans	"The boy cleans." (Object dropped)

This structural symmetry can also be seen with the verb "to write" (тхын). In this case, the antipassive is heavily used, even though the monovalent active intransitive form "мэтхы" is never used in speech:

The "Write" Root (тхын)
Voice	Circassian Example	Gloss	Translation
Active Transitive	КӀалэм гущыӀэр етхы.	Boy-ERG word-ABS writes	"The boy writes the word."
Active Intransitive (not used)	ГущыӀэр мэтхы.	Word-ABS writes	"The word is written." (Agent dropped)
Antipassive Intransitive	КӀалэр матхэ.	Boy-ABS writes	"The boy writes." (Object dropped)

Important: The existence of all three forms (active intransitive, active transitive, and antipassive) for a single verb root is found only in certain dialects. In the Standard Circassian languages (Standard Adyghe and Kabardian), most verb roots exhibit only two of the three forms, while the third is absent. The examples above illustrate the theoretical three-way system; see Distribution of Verb Forms below for what actually occurs in the standard languages.

=== Monovalent Verb Types ===
Monovalent verbs take only a single core argument. Depending on their semantics and morphology, they fall into two types:

- Active Monovalent Intransitive Verbs
- Antipassive Monovalent Intransitive Verbs

==== Active Monovalent Intransitive Verbs ====
Active monovalent verbs describe states, conditions, or non-volitional processes. They are often strictly monovalent, meaning they do not have transitive variants in the standard language. Examples include: тӀысын "to sit", гущыӀэн "to talk", etc. Their single argument (the patient or undergoer) is in the absolutive case.

Sentence:	Мыжъор мэджыджэ.	
Word:	Мыжъо-р	мэджыджэ
Gloss:	The rock-ABS	is rolling
Function:	S	VERB_{intrans}
Translation:	"The rock is rolling."	

Morphologically, the present tense of active monovalent verbs is characterized by the prefix vowel э and the root ending in ы.

Active Monovalent Intransitive Verbs
3rd Person			1st Person		
Present	Past	Translation	Present	Past	Translation
ар мэсты	ар стыгъэ	"(s)he burns"	сэ сэсты	сэ сыстыгъ	"I burn"
ар мэуцу	ар уцугъэ	"(s)he stands still"	сэ сэуцу	сэ сыуцугъ	"I stand still"
ар мэгъы	ар гъыгъэ	"(s)he cries"	сэ сэгъы	сэ сыгъыгъ	"I cry"
ар мэшъу	ар шъугъэ	"(s)he dries"	сэ сэшъу	сэ сышъугъ	"I dry"
ар мэлыджы	ар лыджыгъэ	"(s)he tickles"	сэ сэлыджы	сэ сылыджыгъ	"I tickle"
ар мэтӀысы	ар тӀысыгъэ	"(s)he sits"	сэ сэтӀысы	сэ сытӀысыгъ	"I sit"
ар мэтэджы	ар тэджыгъэ	"(s)he gets up"	сэ сэтэджы	сэ сытэджыгъ	"I get up"
ар мэгъолъы	ар гъолъыгъэ	"(s)he lies down"	сэ сэгъолъы	сэ сыгъолъыгъ	"I lie down"

==== Antipassive Monovalent Intransitive Verbs ====
Unlike active monovalent verbs, antipassive monovalent verbs usually have a bivalent (intransitive or transitive) variant. In these antipassive forms, the default object has been dropped, and the agent takes the absolutive case.

Sentence:	ЛӀыр мал1э.	
Word:	ЛӀыр-р	мал1э
Gloss:	The man-ABS	is dying
Function:	S	VERB_{intrans}
Translation:	"The man is dying."	

Morphologically, they are marked by a pattern containing a long vowel а and ending in a short э.

Antipassive Monovalent Intransitive Verbs
3rd Person			1st Person		
Present	Past	Translation	Present	Past	Translation
ар матхэ	ар тхагъэ	"(s)he writes"	сэ сэтхэ	сэ сытхагъ	"I write"
ар мадэ	ар дагъэ	"(s)he sews"	сэ сэдэ	сэ сыдагъ	"I sew"
ар машхэ	ар шхагъэ	"(s)he eats"	сэ сэшхэ	сэ сышхагъ	"I eat"
ар мажъо	ар жъуагъэ	"(s)he plows"	сэ сэжъо	сэ сыжъуагъ	"I plow"
ар мэлъаӀо	ар лъэӀуагъэ	"(s)he begs"	сэ сэлъаӀо	сэ сылъэӀуагъ	"I beg"
ар мао	ар уагъэ	"(s)he strikes"	сэ сэо	сэ сыуагъ	"I strike"
ар мэужъунтхэ	ар ужъунтхагъэ	"(s)he spits"	сэ сэужъунтхэ	сэ сыужъунтхагъ	"I spit"

=== Distribution of Verb Forms in Standard Circassian ===
In Standard Circassian, verb roots typically exhibit only two of the three possible forms (active intransitive, active transitive, antipassive). The full three-way system is found only in certain dialects. The following patterns are observed in the standard languages:

==== Active Intransitive + Transitive (no antipassive) ====
The monovalent intransitive form is active (patient/undergoer is the absolutive subject). When transitivized, a new agent is introduced in the ergative case, and the patient remains in the absolutive case. No antipassive form exists.

Root	Active Intransitive	Transitive	Translation
Ӏун "to sound"	мэӀу	еӀу	"(s)he hears it"
къутэн "to break"	мэкъутэ	екъутэ	"(s)he breaks it"
укӀын "to kill"	мэукӀы	еукӀы	"(s)he kills it"
стын "to burn"	мэсты	къесты	"it burns him/her/it"

къутэн "to break"
Sentence:	Ӏанэр мэкъутэ.		ЛӀым Ӏанэр екъутэ.		
Word:	Ӏанэ-р	мэкъутэ	ЛӀым	Ӏанэр	екъутэ
Gloss:	The table-ABS	breaks	The man-ERG	the table-ABS	breaks
Function:	S	VERB_{intrans}	A	O	VERB_{trans}
Translation:	"The table breaks."		"The man breaks the table."		

Ӏун "to sound"
Sentence:	Музикэр мэӀу.		КӀалэм музикэр еӀу.		
Word:	Музикэ-р	мэӀу	КӀалэм	музикэр	еӀу
Gloss:	The music-ABS	sounds	The boy-ERG	the music-ABS	hears
Function:	S	VERB_{intrans}	A	O	VERB_{trans}
Translation:	"The music sounds."		"The boy hears the music."		

Verbs in this category that begin with the prefix у- inherently carry a causative meaning. Due to this causative nature, they function as bivalent transitive verbs, where an agent in the ergative case causes a change of state or an action to occur to the patient in the absolutive case.

Root	Active Intransitive	Transitive	Translation
ухын "to finish"	мэухы	еухы	"(s)he finishes it"
узэдын "to load"	мэузэды	еузэды	"(s)he loads it"
укъэбзын "to clean"	мэукъэбзы	еукъэбзы	"(s)he cleans it"
уш1оин "to befoul"	мэуш1ои	еуш1ои	"(s)he befouls it"

ухын "to finish"
Sentence:	Ӏофыр мэухы.		КӀалэм Ӏофыр еухы.		
Word:	Ӏофы-р	мэухы	КӀалэм	Ӏофыр	еухы
Gloss:	The work-ABS	gets finished	The boy-ERG	the work-ABS	finishes
Function:	S	VERB_{intrans}	A	O	VERB_{trans}
Translation:	"The work gets finished."		"The boy finishes the work."		

==== Antipassive + Transitive (no active intransitive) ====
The monovalent intransitive form is antipassive (agent is the absolutive subject, object dropped). When transitivized, the agent is promoted to the ergative case and a direct object is introduced in the absolutive case. The active intransitive form is rare in standard Circassian, though theoretically it can exist.

Root	Antipassive	Transitive	Translation
тхын "to write"	матхэ	етхы	"(s)he writes it"
лъэгъун "to see"	мэлъагъо	елъэгъу	"(s)he sees it"
шхэн "to eat"	машхэ	ешхы	"(s)he eats it"
дэн "to sow"	мадэ	едэ	"(s)he sews it"
тхьак1ын "to wash"	мэтхьак1э	етхьак1ы	"(s)he washes it"
лъэк1ын "to brush"	мэлъак1э	елъэк1ы	"(s)he brushes it"
гык1ын "to launder"	мэгык1э	егык1ы	"(s)he launders it"
жъон "to plow"	мажъо	ежъу	"(s)he plows it"
лэн "to paint"	малэ	елэ	"(s)he paints it"
тхъэн "to enjoy"	матхъэ	етхъы	"(s)he enjoys it"

тхын "to write"
Sentence:	ЛӀыр матхэ.		ЛӀым тхылъыр етхы.		
Word:	ЛӀы-р	матхэ	ЛӀым	тхылъы-р	етхы
Gloss:	The man-ABS	writes	The man-ERG	the book-ABS	writes
Function:	S	VERB_{intrans}	A	O	VERB_{trans}
Translation:	"The man writes."		"The man writes the book."		

шхэн "to eat"
Sentence:	КӀалэр машхэ.		КӀалэм мыӀэрысэр ешхы.		
Word:	КӀалэ-р	машхэ	КӀалэм	мыӀэрысэ-р	ешхы
Gloss:	The boy-ABS	eats	The boy-ERG	the apple-ABS	eats
Function:	S	VERB_{intrans}	A	O	VERB_{trans}
Translation:	"The boy eats."		"The boy eats the apple."		

==== Antipassive + Bivalent Intransitive (no transitive, no active intransitive) ====
The monovalent form is antipassive, and the bivalent form is intransitive (with the target in the oblique case rather than the absolutive). In this pattern, even in dialects, a third form is impossible — because the bivalent form is intransitive (taking an oblique target, not a direct object), there is no transitive or active intransitive counterpart.

Root	Antipassive	Bivalent Intransitive	Translation
плъэн "to look"	маплъэ	еплъы	"(s)he looks at him/her"
джэн "to call"	маджэ	еджэ	"(s)he calls him/her"
он "to hit"	мао	ео	"(s)he hits him/her/it"
шъутырэн "to kick"	мэшъутырэ	ешъутыры	"(s)he kicks him/her/it"
бэун "to kiss"	мэбао	ебэу	"(s)he kisses him/her"
кӀон "to go"	макӀо	екӀу	"(s)he approaches him/her/it"
бзэен "to lick"	мэбзае	ебзэи	"(s)he licks it"
зэон "to fight"	мэзао	езао	"(s)he fights him/her/it"
бэнэн "to brawl"	мэбанэ	ебэны	"(s)he brawls with him/her/it"
хъонэн "to swear"	мэхъуанэ	ехъоны	"(s)he swears at him/her/it"
бгэн "to curse"	мабгэ	ебгы	"(s)he curses him/her/it"
лъэ1он "to beg"	мэлъа1о	елъэ1у	"(s)he begs him/her"
зэгъэн "to coop"	мэзагъэ	езэгъы	"(s)he coops with him/her/it"

Note that in this pattern, the monovalent antipassive form has the agent in the absolutive case, and the bivalent intransitive adds a participant in the oblique case while the agent remains in the absolutive. The oblique argument is always introduced as a new argument — the absolutive subject is never demoted to the oblique.

плъэн "to look"
Sentence:	ЛӀыр маплъэ.		ЛӀыр унэм еплъы.		
Word:	ЛӀы-р	маплъэ	ЛӀы-р	унэ-м	еплъы
Gloss:	The man-ABS	looks	The man-ABS	the house-OBL	looks
Function:	S	VERB_{intrans}	S	OBL	VERB_{intrans}
Translation:	"The man looks."		"The man looks at the house."		

он "to strike"
Sentence:	КӀалэр мао.		КӀалэр чъыгым ео.		
Word:	КӀалэ-р	мао	КӀалэ-р	чъыгы-м	ео
Gloss:	The boy-ABS	strikes	The boy-ABS	the tree-OBL	strikes
Function:	S	VERB_{intrans}	S	OBL	VERB_{intrans}
Translation:	"The boy strikes."		"The boy strikes the tree."		

==== Monovalent Only ====
Some verbs exist only as monovalent intransitive verbs with no bivalent form. They may be either active or antipassive in their morphological pattern:

Type	Example	Translation
Active	мэсты	"(s)he burns"
Antipassive	малӀэ	"(s)he dies"

лӀэн "to die"
Sentence:	ЛӀыр малӀэ.		(No bivalent form)
Word:	ЛӀы-р	малӀэ	—
Gloss:	The man-ABS	dies	—
Function:	S	VERB_{intrans}	—
Translation:	"The man dies."		—

шъун "to dry"
Sentence:	Чъыгыр мэшъу.		(No bivalent form)
Word:	Чъыгы-р	мэшъу	—
Gloss:	The tree-ABS	dries	—
Function:	S	VERB_{intrans}	—
Translation:	"The tree dries."		—

==== Bivalent Only ====
There are Circassian verbs that have no monovalent form and exist strictly as bivalent verbs. They inherently require two arguments (either an absolutive and an oblique for bivalent intransitives, or an ergative and an absolutive for transitives) to form a complete thought:

Root	Circassian Example	Translation
есын "to swim"	КӀалэр хым есы.	"The boy swims in the sea."
къешхын "to rain"	Ошхыр уашъом къешхы.	"The rain rains from the sky."
къесын "to snow"	Осыр уашъом къесы.	"The snow snows from the sky."
ешъон "to drink"	КӀалэр псы ешъо.	"The boy drinks water."
щыгъупшын "to forget"	КӀалэр гущыӀэр къыщыгъупшыгъ.	"The boy forgot the word."
щэн "to take/lead"	КӀалэм пшъэшъэжъыер ещэ тучаным.	"The boy takes the girl to the shop."
хьын "to carry"	КӀалэм дзыор ехьы тучаным.	"The boy carries the bag to the shop."

есын "to swim"
Sentence:	(No monovalent form)	КӀалэр хым есы.		
Word:	—	КӀалэ-р	хы-м	есы
Gloss:	—	The boy-ABS	the sea-OBL	swims
Function:	—	S	OBL	VERB_{intrans}
Translation:	—	"The boy swims in the sea."		

== Distinguishing Transitive and Bivalent Intransitive Verbs ==
A common challenge for English speakers learning Adyghe is distinguishing Transitive verbs from Bivalent Intransitive verbs. Both take two arguments, but their case marking is opposite:

- Transitive — Subject = Ergative (-м); Object = Absolutive (-р).
- Bivalent Intransitive — Subject = Absolutive (-р); Target/Source = Oblique (-м).

The classification turns on a single question: is the action carried to completion on the object (bounded → transitive), or merely directed at a target, source, or location (unbounded → intransitive)? The English-style "does the object undergo an action?" misleads. Three practical tests follow.

=== Test 1: The "Miss" Test (Motion vs. Guaranteed Result) ===
Can the subject perform the motion of the action, miss the object, and still be doing it?

If yes → intransitive (the verb describes the motion; the second argument is a target).

- еон "strike at" — swing your arm, miss the ball; you still "struck."
- еплъын "look at" — your line of sight may be obscured; you still "looked."
- еджэн "call to / read at" — shout out, even if no one hears.
- ебэун "kiss at" — pucker your lips, miss the cheek; you still "kissed."

If no → transitive (the verb requires the object to be altered or captured).

- укӀын "kill" — if you missed, you didn't kill (only attempted).
- лъэгъун "see" — unlike "looking," "seeing" requires successful visual capture.

The same principle organizes Adyghe's broader verb classes.

Transitive verbs (action applied to and completing on the object) include:

- State change / consumption — ешхы "eats", еукӀы "kills", етхьалэ "chokes", ежъо "boils".
- Creation / alteration — етхы "writes", еды "sews", етхьакӀы "washes", егыкӀы "launders", ещэхьы "wraps", еуцохьы "encircles".
- Transfer — еты "gives", ехьы "carries", еӀо "says".
- Assessment — ешы "measures", еуплъэкӀу "inspects", етхъы "enjoys".
  - КӀалэм гущыӀэр ытхыгъ. (The boy wrote the word.)
  - КӀалэм лагъэр ытхьакӀыгъ. (The boy washed the dish.)
  - КӀалэм тхылъыр ыщэфыгъ. (The boy bought the book.)
  - КӀалэм ытхъыгъ мэфэкӀыр. (The boy enjoyed the holiday.)

Bivalent intransitive verbs (action directed at a target / source / location) include:

- Directed action / aggression — ео "strikes at", ебэу "kisses at", ешъутыры "kicks at", еӀункӀэ "knocks at".
- Senses and attention — еплъы "looks at", еджэ "reads at / calls to", ехъоны "scolds at".
- Spatial targeting — нэсы "reaches towards", еӀэ "touches at", ехьэ "enters into", екӀы "exits from".
  - ЛӀыр пыим епыджыгъ. (The man attacked the enemy.)
  - КӀалэр хым есыгъ. (The boy swam in/to the sea.)
  - ЛӀыр хасэм къекӀугъ. (The man approached the council.)

A few cases regularly surprise English speakers because the English verb hides the Adyghe distinction: eating is transitive (the apple is consumed), biting is intransitive (the teeth merely strike at a surface, like hitting), and drinking is intransitive in its basic form (the liquid is treated as a source one drinks from — though a transitive partner exists, see Test 2).

- КӀалэм мыӀэрысыр ышхыгъ. (The boy ate the apple.) — Boy-ERG, Apple-ABS.
- КӀалэр мыӀэрысым ецэкъагъ. (The boy bit the apple.) — Boy-ABS, Apple-OBL.
- КӀалэр псым ешъуагъ. (The boy drank the water.) — Boy-ABS, Water-OBL.

=== Test 2: Verb Pairs (Activity vs. Complete Action) ===
Adyghe has many verb pairs built on a single root: the intransitive member denotes the open-ended activity, while the transitive member denotes the action carried out completely on a specific object, distance, or area. English typically uses one verb for both, hiding the contrast.

The diagnostic question: is this an open-ended activity, or is a specific object/extent being fully covered, consumed, or processed? Many transitive partners are formed with the circumambulative suffix -хьэ ("around / over"), which bounds the action by encompassing a defined area.

1. Going: go / approach / go around (кӀон / къекӀун / къэкӀухьэн)
Locomotion and approach stay intransitive — the destination is a target, not something altered. Only "going around" becomes transitive, because the area is fully encompassed by the path.

Verb	Type	Example	Translation
кӀон (to go)	Intransitive	Ар макӀо.	"He/she goes."
къэкӀон (to come)	Intransitive	Ар къакӀо.	"He/she comes."
къекӀун (to come to, approach)	Intransitive	Ар чылэм къекӀугъ.	"He/she approached the village." (village = OBL)
къэкӀухьэн (to go around)	Transitive	Ащ чылэр къекӀухьэ.	"He/she walks around the village." (village = ABS, encompassed)

2. Running: run / run a distance / run around (чъэн / чъын / къэчъыхьэн)

Verb	Type	Example	Translation
чъэн (to run)	Intransitive	Ар мачъэ.	"He/she runs."
чъын (to run [a distance])	Transitive	Ащ 5 километр ычъыгъ.	"He/she ran 5 km." (distance = ABS, covered)
къэчъыхьэн (to run around)	Transitive	Ащ чылэр къечъыхьэ.	"He/she runs around the village." (village = ABS, encompassed)

3. Eating: eat / eat it (шхэн / шхын)

Verb	Type	Example	Translation
шхэн (to eat, be eating)	Intransitive	Ар машхэ.	"He/she eats."
шхын (to eat it)	Transitive	Ащ мыӀэрысыр ешхы.	"He/she eats the apple." (apple = ABS, consumed)

4. Drinking: drink from / drink it down (ешъон / ришъун)
The basic verb treats the liquid as a source; the transitive partner is used when a defined quantity is fully drained, with the liquid moving to Absolutive and the container to Oblique.

Verb	Type	Example	Translation
ешъон (to drink from)	Intransitive	Ар псым ешъо.	"He/she drinks (from) the water." (water = OBL)
ришъун (to drink it down)	Transitive	Ащ псыр апчым решъу.	"He/she drinks the water from the glass." (water = ABS; glass = OBL)

5. Reading: read at / read it through (еджэн / джын)
The intransitive form treats the book as a target (parallel to "looking at" or "calling to"); the transitive is used when a specific text is read in its entirety.

Verb	Type	Example	Translation
еджэн (to read, be reading)	Intransitive	Ар тхылъым еджэ.	"He/she reads the book." (book = OBL)
джын (to read it through)	Transitive	Ащ КъурӀанэ зы мафэкӀэ ыджыгъ.	"He/she read the Qur'an in one day." (Qur'an = ABS, fully processed)

=== Test 3: Focus of Motion (Manipulation vs. Aiming) ===
For verbs of throwing and physical manipulation, case marking depends on what the sentence is about: the object being moved (transitive), or the target being aimed at (intransitive).

1. Transitive Manipulation — focus on the object physically moved from one place to another.

Sentence:	КӀалэм мыжъор едзы.		
Word:	КӀалэ-м	мыжъо-р	едзы
Gloss:	the boy-ERG	the stone-ABS	throws (moves)
Function:	A	O	VERB_{trans}
Translation:	"The boy throws the stone." (The stone changes location.)		

Further example: ЛӀым чатэр пыим хисагъ. (The man plunged the sword into the enemy.) — the man (ERG) moves the sword (ABS) into a spatial target (the enemy, OBL).

2. Intransitive Aiming — focus on the target, regardless of what (if anything) reaches it.

Sentence:	КӀалэр чъыгым егъуи.		
Word:	КӀалэ-р	чъыгы-м	егъуи
Gloss:	the boy-ABS	the tree-OBL	throws at
Function:	S	IO	VERB_{intrans}
Translation:	"The boy throws [something] at the tree." (The tree is merely a target.)		

== Transitivity Shifts ==
In Circassian, the valency of a verb can be increased in several ways. Some verbs naturally shift between monovalent and bivalent, or bivalent and trivalent forms without any special morphological marking. Beyond these natural shifts, valency can be explicitly increased through morphological operations: the causative prefix (-гъэ-), prepositional prefixes (preverbs), and applicative prefixes (benefactive, malefactive, comitative).

=== Monovalent to Bivalent ===
Some Circassian monovalent intransitive verbs can naturally shift to bivalent verbs without any special valency-increasing prefix. The nature of this shift depends on the semantic type of the verb and results in either a bivalent transitive or a bivalent intransitive construction.

==== Monovalent Intransitive to Bivalent Transitive ====
When a monovalent intransitive verb shifts to a bivalent transitive verb, the case reassignment depends on whether the verb is a state/patient-oriented verb or an agentive/antipassive verb.

===== Subject becomes Object (State/Patient Verbs) =====
In verbs indicating a state or a change of condition, the subject of the intransitive verb (in the absolutive case) becomes the direct object of the transitive verb, while a new agent is introduced in the ergative case. This acts similarly to a causative, where an external agent is causing the state to happen to the object. Other verbs that behave this way include: ухын "to finish", шъыбын "to seal", убэтэн "to break", къутэн "to destroy", etc.

Context	Sentence	Gloss	Function	Translation
Intransitive	КӀалэр мэтхьалэ	The boy-ABS suffocates	S VERB_{intrans}	"The boy is suffocating."
Transitive	Ӏугъом кӀалэр етхьалэ	The smoke-ERG the boy-ABS suffocates	A O VERB_{trans}	"The smoke suffocates the boy."

Context	Sentence	Gloss	Function	Translation
Intransitive	Музикэр мэӀу	Music-ABS sounds	S VERB_{intrans}	"Music is heard."
Transitive	КӀалэм музикэр еӀу	The boy-ERG music-ABS hears	A O VERB_{trans}	"The boy hears the music."

Context	Sentence	Gloss	Function	Translation
Intransitive	ШӀоир къэлъагъо	Dirty-ABS appears/is-seen	S VERB_{intrans}	"The filth is seen."
Transitive	КӀалэм шӀоир къелъэгъу	The boy-ERG dirty-ABS sees	A O VERB_{trans}	"The boy sees the filth."

Additional examples:

- ар мэшъыбы → ащ ар ешъыбы ("it is being sealed" → "(s)he seals it")
- ар мэубатэ → ащ ар еубатэ ("it breaks" → "(s)he breaks it")

===== Subject becomes Agent (Antipassive Verbs) =====
In inherently agentive verbs, the intransitive form functions as an antipassive construction, where the object has been dropped and the agent takes the absolutive case. When a direct object is introduced, the actor is promoted from the absolutive to the ergative case, and the new direct object takes the absolutive case. Other verbs that behave this way include: шхэн "to eat", дэн "to sew", жъон "to plow", гыкӀэн "to do laundry", тхьакӀэн "to wash", etc.

Context	Sentence	Gloss	Function	Translation
Antipassive Intransitive	Пшъашъэр мадэ	The girl-ABS sews	S VERB_{intrans}	"The girl sews."
Transitive	Пшъашъэм джанэр едэ	The girl-ERG the dress-ABS sews	A O VERB_{trans}	"The girl sews the dress."

Context	Sentence	Gloss	Function	Translation
Antipassive Intransitive	КӀалэр матхэ	The boy-ABS writes	S VERB_{intrans}	"The boy is writing."
Transitive	КӀалэм гущыӀэр етхы	The boy-ERG the word-ABS writes	A O VERB_{trans}	"The boy writes the word."

==== Monovalent Intransitive to Bivalent Intransitive ====
Some monovalent intransitive verbs can shift to bivalent intransitive verbs by introducing an indirect object in the oblique case (-м). In this shift, the actor remains in the absolutive case and a new oblique participant is added. In this type of shift, the oblique case is always introduced as a new argument — the absolutive subject is never demoted to the oblique case. Oblique arguments are always added, never promoted into.

Context	Sentence	Gloss	Function	Translation
Monovalent Intransitive	КӀалэр мэлъаӀо	The boy-ABS begs	S VERB_{intrans}	"The boy begs."
Bivalent Intransitive	КӀалэр тхьэматэм елъэӀу	The boy-ABS the boss-OBL begs	S IO VERB_{intrans}	"The boy begs the boss."

Context	Sentence	Gloss	Function	Translation
Monovalent Intransitive	ДзакӀор мэзао	The soldier-ABS fights	S VERB_{intrans}	"The soldier fights."
Bivalent Intransitive	ДзакӀор пыим езао	The soldier-ABS the enemy-OBL fights	S IO VERB_{intrans}	"The soldier fights the enemy."

=== Bivalent to Trivalent ===
In rare cases, some bivalent transitive verbs can naturally shift to trivalent ditransitive verbs without any special prefix, by introducing an indirect object in the oblique case (-м). The existing ergative agent and absolutive direct object remain unchanged.

Context	Sentence	Gloss	Function	Translation
Bivalent Transitive	КӀалэм гущыӀэр еӀо	The boy-ERG the word-ABS says	A DO VERB_{trans}	"The boy is saying the word."
Trivalent Ditransitive	КӀалэм гущыӀэр пшъашъэм реӀо	The boy-ERG the word-ABS the girl-OBL says	A DO IO VERB_{trans}	"The boy is saying the word to the girl."

== Valency Increase ==
In Circassian, some verbs can naturally shift between monovalent and bivalent, or bivalent and trivalent forms without any special morphological marking. But, valency can also be explicitly increased through morphological operations: the causative prefix (-гъэ-), prepositional prefixes (preverbs), and applicative prefixes (benefactive, malefactive, comitative).

=== Causative Valency Increase ===
Verbs can increase their valency by attaching the causative affix -гъэ- (meaning "to force, to make"). Because a verb can have a maximum of one Absolutive, one Ergative, and one Oblique argument, the causative operation effectively fills in the "missing" argument.

From Monovalent Intransitive: The base verb lacks an Ergative argument. The causative introduces the causer as the new Ergative subject.

Context	Sentence	Function	Translation
Base Intransitive	Ady: КӀалэр мачъэ Kbd: ЩӀалэр мажэ	ABS VERB	"The boy runs."
Causative Transitive	Ady: ЛӀым кӀалэр егъачъэ Kbd: ЛӀым щӀалэр егъажэ	ERG ABS VERB	"The man makes the boy run."

From Bivalent Intransitive: The base verb has Absolutive and Oblique, but lacks an Ergative. The causative introduces the causer as the new Ergative subject.

Context	Sentence	Function	Translation
Base Intransitive	Ady: КӀалэр пшъашъэм еплъы Kbd: ЩӀалэр пщащэм йоплъ	ABS OBL VERB	"The boy looks at the girl."
Causative Transitive	Ady: ЛӀым кӀалэр пшъашъэм регъэплъы Kbd: ЛӀым щӀалэр пщащэм регъэплъ	ERG ABS OBL VERB	"The man makes the boy look at the girl."

From Bivalent Transitive: The base verb has Ergative and Absolutive, but lacks an Oblique. When the causative is applied, the original Ergative subject is demoted to the missing Oblique slot, and a new causer is introduced as the Ergative subject.

Context	Sentence	Function	Translation
Base Transitive	Ady: КӀалэм пшъашъэр елъэгъу Kbd: ЩӀалэм пщащэр елъагъу	ERG ABS VERB	"The boy sees the girl."
Causative Transitive	Ady: ЛӀым пшъашъэр кӀалэм регъэлъэгъу Kbd: ЛӀым пщащэр щӀалэм регъэлъагъу	ERG ABS OBL VERB	"The man makes the boy see the girl."

=== Valency and Prepositions (Preverbs) ===
One of the most productive and important valency-increasing mechanisms in Circassian is the addition of prepositional prefixes (preverbs). These are positional prepositions that attach directly to the verb stem, such as хэ- 'within/into', те- 'on/upon', чӀэ-/щӀэ- 'under', и- 'in/inside', and others. Unlike in many languages where prepositions are independent words, in Circassian they are bound morphemes that fuse with the verb, fundamentally altering its argument structure. By attaching the preverb to the verb stem, the verb now requires a locative target or spatial participant. This new participant fills the oblique case (-м) slot to denote its locative role. Because a Circassian verb can only support one oblique argument slot, a preverb can only be added to a verb that does not already have one. This constraint makes preverb attachment a strictly valency-increasing operation: it is available only to verbs whose oblique slot is unoccupied.

- From Monovalent Intransitive (S): Taking a preverb turns it into a Preposition-ed Bivalent Intransitive (S, IO). The new locative target takes the Oblique case.

Context	Sentence	Function	Translation
Base Intransitive	Ady: Сэ сыплъагъ Kbd: Сэ сыплъащ	ABS VERB	"I looked."
Preposition-ed Bivalent Intransitive	Ady: Сэ ащ схэплъагъ Kbd: Сэ абы схэплъащ	ABS OBL VERB	"I looked into that."

- From Bivalent Transitive (A, O): Taking a preverb turns it into a Preposition-ed Trivalent Transitive (A, O, IO). The new locative target takes the Oblique case.

Context	Sentence	Function	Translation
Base Transitive	Ady: Сэ ар сыдзыгъ Kbd: Сэ ар сдзащ	ERG ABS VERB	"I threw it."
Preposition-ed Trivalent Transitive	Ady: Сэ ар ащ хэсдзагъ Kbd: Сэ ар абы хэсдзащ	ERG ABS OBL VERB	"I threw it into that."

Bivalent Intransitive & Trivalent Ditransitive verbs cannot take an additional preverb because their oblique case slot is already occupied. To apply a spatial prefix to a bivalent intransitive concept, you must attach it to its monovalent root instead.

In Circassian, 1st and 2nd person Personal pronouns (ex. Сэ "I", Уэ "You", etc.) do not take overt case endings. Their role as Absolutive, Ergative, or Oblique is instead determined by word order and the verb's cross-reference prefixes.

Because the oblique slot can only hold one argument, increasing a verb's valency forces a choice between a Dative route (adding an indirect object/recipient) or a Locative route (adding a spatial preverb). Once a verb is modified to take a Dative object, its oblique slot is full, meaning it cannot simultaneously take a prepositional preverb. To add a spatial preverb, it must be attached directly to the base verb root, not the dative-modified root.

- Intransitive Paths (S → S, IO): The base monovalent verb плъэн (to look) can take a dative index to become еплъын (to look at), or it can take a spatial preverb to become хэплъэн (to look into). However, the dative-modified еплъын cannot take a preverb because its oblique slot is already occupied.

Context	Sentence	Function	Translation
Base Intransitive	КIалэр маплъэ	ABS VERB	"The boy looks."
Dative Route (Bivalent)	КIалэр хым еплъы	ABS OBL VERB	"The boy looks at the sea."
Locative Route (Preposition-ed Bivalent)	КIалэр хым хаплъэ	ABS OBL VERB	"The boy looks into the sea."

- Transitive Paths (A, O → A, O, IO): Similarly, the base bivalent verb ыIон (to say something) can take a dative index to become риIон (to say to someone), or it can take a preverb to become хыриIухьэн (to say inside something). The dative-modified риIон cannot take a preverb.

Context	Sentence	Function	Translation
Base Transitive	КIалэм гущыIэр еIо	ERG ABS VERB	"The boy says the word."
Dative Route (Trivalent)	КIалэм гущыIэр пшъашъэм реIо	ERG ABS OBL VERB	"The boy says the word to the girl."
Locative Route (Preposition-ed Trivalent)	КIалэм гущыIэр хым хыреIухьэ	ERG ABS OBL VERB	"The boy says the word inside the sea."

=== Applicative Valency Increase ===
Applicative constructions increase the valency of a verb by introducing a new participant through an applicative prefix. Unlike preverbs, which introduce a spatial/locative participant, applicative prefixes introduce participants with non-spatial semantic roles. In Circassian, these include:

- Benefactive applicatives, which introduce a participant who benefits from the action.
- Malefactive applicatives, which introduce a participant who is negatively affected by the action.
- Comitative applicatives, which introduce a participant who accompanies or is involved with the actor in performing the action.

Like preverbs and causatives, applicative prefixes fill the oblique case (-м) slot. Therefore, they can only be applied to verbs whose oblique slot is not already occupied. The applicative participant takes the oblique case, following the same constraint that a Circassian verb can contain at most one absolutive, one ergative, and one oblique argument.
