= STodsde Horpa =

Gyalrongic language of China

Stodsde
- Shangzhai
- pʰôsiskɜt, ɬtsôŋskɜt, zɡərôskɜt
- Native to: China
- Region: Ngawa Prefecture, Sichuan
- Native speakers: 4,100 (2004)
- Language family: Sino-Tibetan: Tibeto-Burman; Qiangic; Gyalrongic; West Gyalrongic; Horpa; Stodsde

Language codes
- ISO 639-3: jih
- Glottolog: shan1274

Stodsde is a Horpa language spoken in southern Dzamthang, Sichuan, China. The name Stodsde comes from Tibetan stod sde, which means "upper village".

Speakers are classified as ethnic Tibetans by the Chinese government.

== Glossonym ==
The name Stodsde for this language derives from a local toponym, corresponding to Chinese 上寨 (Shàngzhài), whose Tibetan form is stod sde. Locally, the Shangzhai area roughly refers to the territory of what is today Dayili Village (大伊里村), and it is the most economically developed area in the region, exerting considerable influence on surrounding villages—for instance, the critically endangered Khroskyabs dialect of Yala, spoken in Xiadashigou (下大石沟), has been significantly influenced by the Dayili dialect. Even in the Western Zbu area, many people can speak Stodsde.

Ultimately, however, the name "Stodsde" is an academic convention, and naming the language as such presents certain issues. First, the dialect of Dayili Village does not have clear representative status. Second, unlike Nyagrong Minyag or some southern Stau dialects, this language lacks an autoglossonym; local speakers either refer to their language as jɜ̂ɲiskɜt or məɲîskɜt 'our language', or use a toponym + skɜt to refer to their particular dialect.

== Dialects ==
Stodsde has three main dialects: Phosi, Rtsangkhog, and Sili. Overall, the Stodsde dialects are highly mutually intelligible, and the differences among them are mainly lexical. Liu (2025, p. 15) divides Stodsde into two primary branches based on phonological and morphological differences: Phosi (蒲西话), spoken in Puxi Township, and Western Stodsde, spoken in the western areas of Puxi Township. Western Stodsde can be further subdivided into two major dialects: Rtsangkhog (宗科话) and Sili (石里话).

- Phosi (蒲西)
- Western Stodsde (西部上寨话)
  - Rtsangkhog (宗科话)
  - Sili (石里话)

A brief introduction to each dialect:

- Phosi (蒲西): The Phosi dialect is spoken in Puxi Village and Yili Village within Puxi Township. The language varieties of the two villages differ only in several words and morphosyntactic features; for example, the Yili dialect has lost the dedicated negative prefix mê- used before verbs that do not require orientational prefixes. Liu (2025) notes that while the official Tibetan spelling is pho sul, this spelling is a later creation and does not reflect the actual pronunciation of the village name. Moreover, the Chinese transcription Puxi risks confusion with a Qiang dialect of the same name. Consequently, the name Phosi, which reflects the actual pronunciation, is preferred. The estimated number of native speakers of the Phosi dialect is only about one thousand, of whom over seven hundred reside in Yili Village. Both Puxi Village and Yili Village also contain a considerable number of native speakers of Khroskyabs.
- Rtsangkhog (宗科): The Rtsangkhog dialect is spoken in the First and Second Brigades of Zongke Township, while the Third Brigade of Zongke Township speaks the Amdo dialect of Tibetan. Similar to the situation with Phosi, the language varieties within the villages of Zongke Township differ only in isolated lexical items and morphosyntactic features. Relative to the other two dialects, Rtsangkhog contains a comparatively higher number of Tibetan loanwords.
- Sili (石里): The Sili dialect is spoken in wutû Village (阿斗村) and zɡərô Village (二戈武村) within Sili Township. Sili represents the northernmost extent of the Stodsde-speaking area and is in close contact with Western Zbu. Some evident Zbu loanwords can be found in Sili, e.g. təvěʶ '(short) trumpet'.

== Phonology ==
=== Onsets ===
The Phosi dialect has 50 consonantal phonemes, shown in the table below, with the marginal phonemes in parentheses. Other Stodsde dialects exhibit similar systems.

Phosi Stodsde consonants
		Labial	Dental/ Alveolar		Retroflex	Alveolo- palatal	Palatal	Velar	Uvular
		Labial	plain	sib.	Retroflex	Alveolo- palatal	Palatal	Velar	Uvular
Occlusive	nasal	m	n				ɲ	ŋ	(ɴ)
Occlusive	voiceless	p	t	ts	tʂ	tɕ	c	k	q
Occlusive	aspirated	pʰ	tʰ	tsʰ	tʂʰ	tɕʰ	cʰ	kʰ	qʰ
Occlusive	voiced	b	d	dz	dʐ	dʑ	ɟ	g	ɢ
Continuant	voiceless	f	(ɬ)	s	(ʂ)	ɕ	ç	(x)	χ
Continuant	aspirated			sʰ		ɕʰ	çʰ		
Continuant	voiced	v, (β), w	l, r	z		ʑ	j	ɣ	ʁ

Stodsde has a relatively complex syllable structure, allowing up to six consonants in the initial cluster, as in χxfɬtsvə̂ 'to be made rot', and also permits complex codas such as -ɣn and -wn in person indexation.

=== Rhymes ===
Phosi has 18 vowels in total. These vowels come in three series:

- Plain vowels: /i, e, ə, ɜ, ɐ, u, o/
- Uvularized vowels: /iʶ, əʶ, ʌʶ, ɐʶ, uʶ, oʶ/. These vowels are pronounced with retracted tongue root, resulting in a more backed and lower articulation.
- Nasalized vowels: /ɐ̃, ə̃, ə̃ʶ, õ/. These vowels can generally be considered marginal since they only appear in certain verbal forms indexed with first person /-j/.

Western Stodsde lects have similar vowel systems, only lacking the /ʌʶ/ vowel found in Phosi but having an /eʶ/ instead.

=== Tones ===
Two tones are attested in Stodsde, a high-falling (HL) tone, noted σ̂, and a low-rising (LH) tone, noted σ̌. Some minimal pairs in Phosi include ɡrə̂ 'sinew' and ɡrə̌ 'water', rêɣ 'one' and rěɣ 'cloth', ŋô 'five' and ŋǒ 'to be ill'.
