= Qingning =

Qingning may refer to:

- Qingning (1055–1064), reign period of Emperor Daozong of Liao
- Qingning, Dazhou, Sichuan, China
- Qingning Township, Jinchuan County, Sichuan, China
