= Jiangxue Pan =

Founder and chairwoman of Adream foundation

Jiangxue (Shirley) Pan (Chinese: 潘江雪; pinyin: Pān Jiāngxuě) is the founder and chairwoman of the Adream Foundation. She is also the Founder and chair of the Board of Directors of the Hong Kong–based Cherished Dream Foundation. As of April 2023, Adream Foundation has served over 19 million Chinese students, most coming from disadvantaged backgrounds.

== Early life and education ==
Pan was born and raised in Beijing, China.

== Career ==
Prior to founding the Adream Foundation, Pan worked in the finance industry for 13 years. She was a board member of China Merchants Securities (HK) and a director at HSBC. Two experiences where Pan nearly "escaped from death" prompted Pan to start the Adream Foundation. First, in 2001, Pan and her colleagues were staying at the Marriott Hotel of the former World Trade Center. On September 11th, 2001, Pan was going to board the flight that was later hijacked but decided to change her flight at the last minute. She realized later that the building that she just stayed at a day ago was destroyed while she herself nearly escaped death by changing her flight. Second, ten months later, during her trip to Lijiang, Yunnan Province, she had a car accident and was hospitalized for a month. Starting then, Pan wanted to start another career.

In 2002, when visiting Barkam, Sichuan Province, she found out that a lot of students chose not to stay in school, as family generally lacked awareness of education. To help solve the problem, Pan first started a one-to-one donation to Tibetan children among her friends. However, she realized that donating money cannot solve the problem.

In 2007, Pan officially started her career in public welfare. She aimed to open a library within a No. 2 Middle School of Barkam, so that students could read new books and use the Internet. In 2008, the first Adream center opened. Ten years later, the Adream Center was not only a library but a learning space with soft skills curriculum and other extracurricular activities.

As of April 2023, Adream Foundation has constructed more than 5500 Centers and served more than 19 million students.

In 2022, Pan published her book "Effective Love—A Preliminary Study on the Methodology of Adream Foundation".

== Awards and honors ==
2013 Member of "Global Women Leaders Mentoring Partnership"

2014 "Most Responsible Leader of the Year" by Southern Weekly

2015 "Top 10 Female Public Welfare Leaders"

2017 CCTV Charity Night Winner

2019 "March 8th Red Banner Bearer" Award

2021 "National Advanced Individual in Poverty Alleviation" Award by State Council of the People's Republic of China.

Pan was also a member of the 13th Shanghai CPPCC (Chinese People's Political Consultative Conference)
