= Nyagrong Minyag =

Gyalrongic language of China

- Western Horpa
- məɲâ, məɲô
- Native to: China
- Region: Garze Prefecture, Sichuan
- Language family: Sino-Tibetan: Tibeto-Burman; Qiangic; Gyalrongic; West Gyalrongic; Horpa; Nyagrong Minyag

Language codes
- ISO 639-3: –
- ELP: Nyagrong Minyag

Nyagrong Minyag is a Horpa language spoken in central and southern Nyagrong County, Sichuan, China. This language is not to be confused with Muya languages, even though both share a similar autoglossonym. Since this language came to the attention of linguists only after the Muya languages, it was named Nyagrong Minyag. Its closely related languages include Stau and Stodsde.

Speakers are classified as ethnic Tibetans by the Chinese government.

== Dialects ==
Nyagrong Minyag has three main dialects: Manchen, Bangsmad, and Youlaxi. These dialects are highly unintelligible, and speakers of different dialects tend to communicate using the local Tibetan language. Liu (2025, p. 15) divides Nyagrong Minyag into two primary branches: Manchen, spoken near Nyagrong township, and Southern Nyagrong Minyag, spoken in the southern part of Nyagrong. Southern Nyagrong Minyag includes Bangsmad and Youlaxi, whose shared innovations include the reshaping of certain codas, etc.

- Manchen (蔓青)
- Southern Nyagrong Minyag
  - Bangsmad (博美)
  - Youlaxi (尤拉西)

A brief introduction to each dialect:

- Manchen: The Manchen dialect is spoken near Nyagrong township in villages such as Heiri (黑日), Ri ‘dabs (日达), and Rimgo, among others (Liu 2024). Phonologically, its consonant system has undergone considerable simplification, e.g. all consonantal codas have been entirely lost, whereas in Southern Nyagrong Minyag they are indirectly preserved through a shared innovation. Manchen itself is a toponym, and the area was formerly known as 甲拉西 Jialaxi.
- Bangsmad (博美): The Bangsmad dialect is spoken in Bangsmad County. According to the description of Van Way (2018)., it is a non-tonal language, unlike the other two Nyagrong Minyag dialects.
- Youlaxi (尤拉西): The Youlaxi dialect is spoken in three brigades in Youlaxi County, whereas the other two in Youlaxi County are Queyu-speaking. While appearing to be somewhat more conservative than the other two dialects, Youlaxi also contains a number of Queyu loanwords, such as ɣdǐ 'to fly' and -ɕɜ 'nominalizer of patient role', among others.

== Phonology ==
=== Onsets ===
Liu (2024) gives an overview of Manchen phonology. The onsets are shown in Table below.

Manchen consonants
		Labial	Dental	Alveolar	Retroflex	Alveolo- palatal	Palatal	Velar	Uvular
Occlusive	voiceless	p	t	ts	tʂ	tɕ	c	k	q
Occlusive	aspirated	pʰ	tʰ	tsʰ	tʂʰ	tɕʰ	cʰ	kʰ	qʰ
Occlusive	voiced	b	d	dz	dʐ	dʑ	ɟ	g	ɢ
Occlusive	nasal	m	n				ɲ	ŋ	(ɴ)
Continuant	voiceless	(f)	ɬ	s		ɕ	ç	(x)	χ
Continuant	aspirated			sʰ		ɕʰ	çʰ		
Continuant	voiced	v,(β),w	ɮ,l	z		ʑ	j	ɣ	ʁ
Trill			r						

Manchen Nyagrong Minyag possesses a typologically rare quadruple opposition of lateral sounds.

Word	Gloss
lə̂	to boil.PST
ɬə̂	male dzo
ɬʰə̂	milk
ɮə̂	to cultivate

=== Rhymes ===
Manchen has 8 vowels in total: i, e, ɛ, a, ə, u, o, ɔ.

When occurring after coronal consonants, /u/ is often fronted to /y/.

=== Tones ===
There are two tones in Manchen Nyagrong Minyag: a high-falling (HL) tone, and a low-rising (LH) tone. Some minimal pairs include jmə̂ 'fire' and jmə̌ 'to forget', rê 'one' and rě 'tissue', jbə̂ 'to accumulate' and jbə̌ 'sun', etc.
