= Horpa language =

Rgyalrongic language of China

Horpa
- Stau
- Native to: China
- Region: Garzê Prefecture, Sichuan Province
- Native speakers: 50,000 (2002–2004)
- Language family: Sino-Tibetan: Tibeto-Burman; Qiangic; Gyalrongic; West Gyalrongic; Horpa
- Early form: Tangut

Language codes
- ISO 639-3: Either: ero – Horpa jih – Stodsde (Shangzhai)
- Glottolog: horp1240
- ELP: Horpa; Nyagrong Minyag
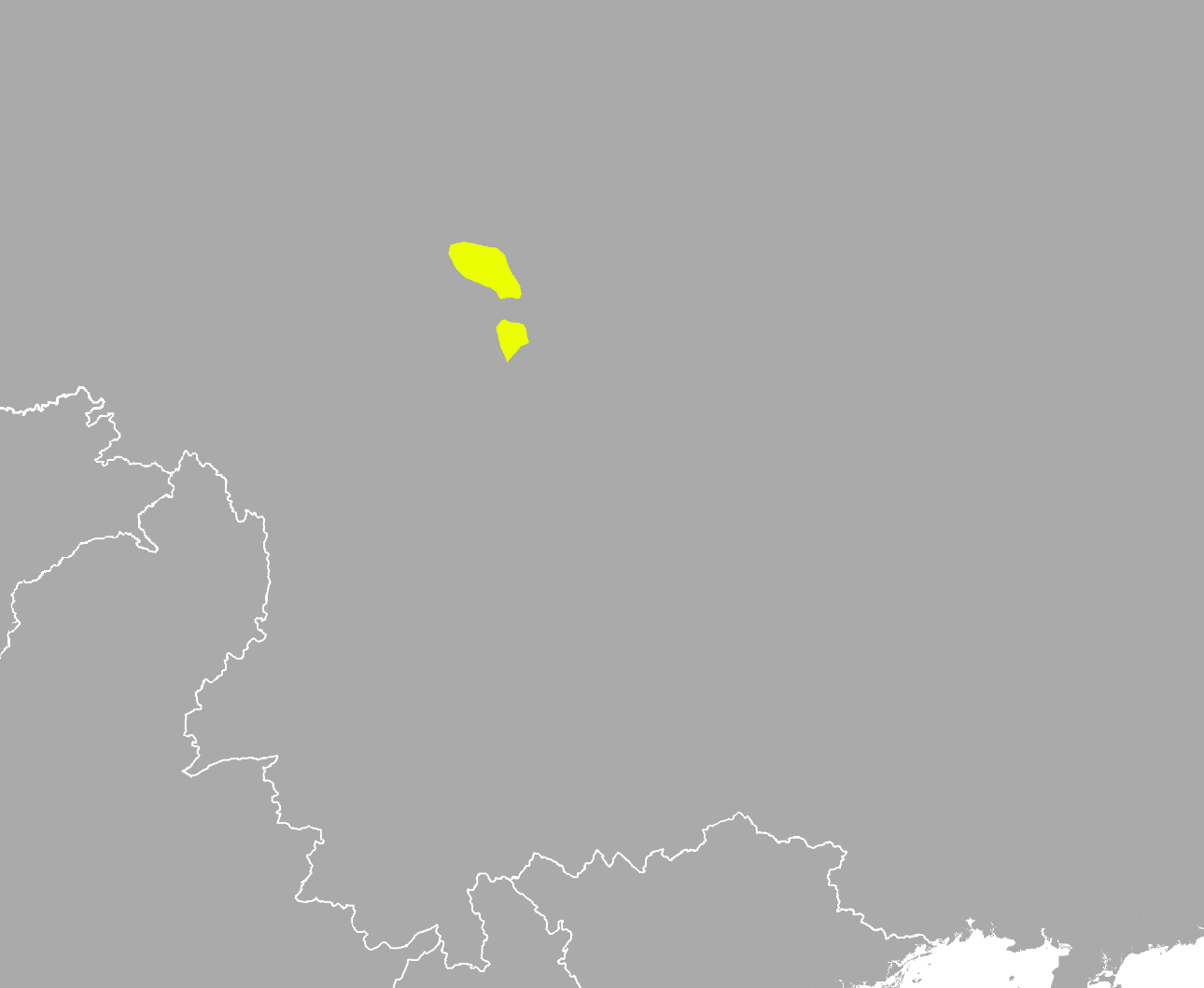
- Regions where Horpa languages are spoken today within Southern China.

Horpa (also known in some publications as Stau – Chinese: 道孚语 Daofu, 爾龔語 Ergong) are a cluster of closely related Gyalrongic languages of China. Horpa is better understood as a cluster of closely related yet mutually unintelligible dialect groups/languages. Its main dialects include Stau, Nyagrong Minyag, Stodsde, Geshiza, Bawang, etc.

== Names ==
Ethnologue lists alternate names and dialect names for Horpa as Stau/Daofuhua, Bawang, Bopa, Danba, Dawu, Geshitsa/Geshiza/Geshizahua, Hor, Huo’er, Hórsók, Nyagrong-Minyag, Pawang, Rgu, Western Gyarong/Western Jiarong, Xinlong-Muya, and rTa’u.

== Classification ==
Horpa is a type of Gyalrongic language, a branch of the Qiangic languages of the Sino-Tibetan family. Gyalrong (proper), Khroskyabs, and Horpa are in the Gyalrongic subgroup. From a genetic perspective, Horpa is a branch within West Gyalrongic, the other being Khroskyabs. To date, the Horpa languages are the closest attested ones to the medieval language Tangut.

== Geographic distribution ==
Horpa is spoken primarily in western Sichuan province, China, including in Dasang District, Danba County of Garzê Tibetan Autonomous Prefecture, Sichuan. There are about 50,000 Horpa speakers in the northwestern Sichuan. It is also spoken in nearby Dawu County, where it is called 'Stau', pronounced [stawuske].

The cluster of languages variously referred to as Stau, Ergong or Horpa in the literature are spoken over a large area from Ndzamthang county (in Chinese Rangtang 壤塘县) in Rngaba prefecture (Aba 阿坝州) to Rtau county (Dawu 道孚) in Dkarmdzes prefecture (Ganzi 甘孜州), in Sichuan province, China. At the moment of writing, it is still unclear how many unintelligible varieties belong to this group, but at least three must be distinguished: the language of Rtau county (referred to as ‘Stau’ in this paper), the Dgebshes language (Geshizha 格什扎话) spoken in Rongbrag county (Danba 丹巴), and the Stodsde language (Shangzhai 上寨; སྟོད་སྡེ།) in Ndzamthang.

== Varieties ==
Varieties of Horpa include Shangzhai Horpa and Gexi Horpa (Sun 2013).

Jackson Sun (2018) lists the following five varieties of Horpa.

- Central Horpa (Stau-Dgebshes) is widely spoken in Rta’u County (Daofu County 道孚县) and Rongbrag County (Danba County 丹巴县), Dkarmdzes Prefecture, as well as a few villages in western Chuchen County (Jinchuan County 金川县), Rngaba Prefecture. It consists of 3 dialects.
  - Rta’u (Daofu 道孚) (non-tonal). Also documented in Gen'ga Wengmu (2019).
  - Dgebshesrtsa (Geshezha 革什扎) (non-tonal)
  - Upper Stongdgu (Shang Donggu 上东谷) (has constrative phonation)
- Northern Horpa (Stodsde) is spoken in southern Dzamthang County (Rangtang County 壤塘县), Rngaba Prefecture. It is the most conservative Horpa variety, and preserves many archaic morphological features. There are 3 mutually intelligible dialects. Stodsde is spoken in southern Rangtang County, where it is spoken in the townships of Puxi, Sili, and Zongke townships. There are 4,100 speakers as of 2004. Dialects are Phosi, Rtsangkhog and Sili (Liu 2025).
  - Phosi (蒲西)
  - Rtsangkhog (宗科)
  - Sili (石里)
- Western Horpa is a tonal language scattered throughout several small areas of central and southern Nyagrong County (Xinlong County 新龙县), Dkarmdzes Prefecture. Although speakers refer to themselves as Minyag (məɲâ in Manchen, məɲô in Youlaxi, etc.), Western Horpa is not the same language as the Minyag or Muya language. There are 3 dialects that are significantly different from each other. The Bangsmad dialect of Nyagrong Minyag language has also been documented by Van Way (2018).
  - Manchen (蔓青; formerly known as 甲拉西)
  - Youlaxi (尤拉西)
  - Bangsmad (博美)
- Northwestern Horpa, an endangered Horpa variety, is spoken in southern Brag’go County (Luhuo County 炉霍县) and adjacent areas of Rta’u County (Daofu County 道孚县). There is heavy Tibetan influence and minor internal diversity. It is non-tonal.
- Eastern Horpa is a divergent Horpa variety spoken in Dpa’bo (Bawang 巴旺) and Nyindkar (Niega 聂嘎) townships, eastern Rongbrag County (Danba County 丹巴县). Beaudouin & Honkasalo (2023) suggest that Tangut is likely closely related to present-day Eastern Horpa varieties.

== Phonology ==
=== Consonants ===
		Labial	Alveolar		Retroflex	Alveolo- palatal	Palatal	Velar	Uvular	Glottal
		Labial	plain	sibilant	Retroflex	Alveolo- palatal	Palatal	Velar	Uvular	Glottal
Nasal		m	n				ɲ	ŋ	(ɴ)	
Stop/ Affricate	voiceless	p	t	t͡s	t͡ʂ	t͡ɕ	c	k	q	(ʔ)
Stop/ Affricate	aspirated	pʰ	tʰ	t͡sʰ	t͡ʂʰ	t͡ɕʰ	cʰ	kʰ	qʰ	
Stop/ Affricate	voiced	b	d	d͡z	d͡ʐ	d͡ʑ	ɟ	ɡ	(ɢ)	
Fricative	voiceless	(f)	ɬ	s	(ʂ)	ɕ		x	χ	(h)
Fricative	voiced	v	ɮ	z	(ʐ)	ʑ		ɣ	ʁ	
Lateral			l							
Sonorant		w	r				j			

- /q/ is heard as [ɢ] when following a nasal consonant.
- A glottal stop [ʔ] is also heard, but only when occurring before word-initial onset-less vowel syllables.
- /v/ can be heard as voiceless [f] when preceding or following voiceless consonants.
- /x/ can also be heard as glottal [h] in free variation among speakers.
- The uvular nasal [ɴ] is only heard when appearing together with uvular consonants /q/, /qʰ/ and [ɢ].

==== Rhotic consonant ====
/r/ has four allophones as either retroflex voiceless [ʂ] or voiced [ʐ] fricatives, as a trill [r], or as a result of vowel rhotacization [V˞]. It is heard as [ʂ] when preceding or following voiceless consonants or also as a word-final coda. It is heard as [ʐ] when in free variation in initial position or when preceding or following voiced consonants. The occurrence of it as a trill [r] is heard word-medially when after a vowel and before a consonant, but is for the most part less predictable in that it overlaps in distribution with [ʂ] and especially [ʐ]. When words with /r/ are heard in isolation, the sound is heard as [ʐ], but then it becomes a trill [r] when in word context or within compounds. [r] also alternates with [ʂ] when it is in context word-final position. The rhotacization of vowels [V˞] occurs on the preceding vowel before /r/ in word-final position, however it can also be heard word-medially when before a lateral approximant /l/. The rhotacization is attested on the vowels /ɛ/, /ə/, /u/ and /ɑ/.

=== Vowels ===
	Front	Central	Back
Close	i		u
Close-mid	e	ə	o
Open-mid	ɛ	ə	
Open	æ		ɑ

- /i/ is also heard as [ɪ], when in word-final position by a coda consonant.

=== Tones ===
Not all Horpa lects are tonal. The vast majority of dialects in the central and eastern areas are non-tonal languages. However, in the north and west, the two peripheral areas where Horpa is distributed, a two-tone system can still be found: one high-falling and one low-rising. In the northern and western dialects, namely Stodsde and Nyagrong Minyag, tones are still quite active. Not only can several minimal pairs be found at the lexical level, but there is also a phenomenon of tone alternation across different verb stems.

== Vocabulary ==
The following comparative table of Horpa diagnostic vocabulary items is from Sun (2018:4). The Central Horpa (Rta’u) data is from Niwan Village, Dgebshes Township, Rta’u County (Daofu County), Sichuan. The Rgyalrongic languages Khroskyabs and Rgyalrong are also provided for comparison, since Horpa is one of the Rgyalrongic languages. Cognates are highlighted in bold.

Gloss	Central Horpa (Rta’u 道孚)	Northern Horpa (Rtsangkhog 宗科)	Western Horpa (Rgyarwagshis 甲拉西)	Eastern Horpa (Dpa’bo 巴旺)	Northwestern Horpa (Nyinmo)	Khroskyabs (’brongrdzong)	Rgyalrong (Tshobdun)
sun	ɣbə	**ʁɟə̀**	**ɣbə̀**	**ʁʷbə**	**ɣbə**	ɣnəʔ ~ **ʁbjə**	tɐ́-ŋɐ
water	ɣrə	**grə̀**	**ɣrə̀**	**wrə**	**ɣrə**	**ɣdə**	tə-ciʔ
person	vdzi	**vdzì**	**vdzì**	**vdzi**-sme	**vdzi**	**vɟoʔ**	kə-**rnbjoʔ**
mouth	jɑ	ɣmú	ɬó	ʁmo	**ja**	qʰo	tə-ɣmor
heart	zjar	**zɟwàʶ**	**jzò**-rdá	**zdzʌr**	**zʒar**	**sjar**	tə-sni
liver	sʰi	**sʰə̀**	**sʰə̀**	**sʰi**	**si**	**fseʔ**	tə-**mtsʰi**
meat	bjoŋnoŋ	**bdʒànó**	ntʰú	**mdʒʌno**	**pcene**	tʰəmʔ	ʃe
horse	rɣi	**rì**	**rjí**	**rji**	**rji**	**breʔ**	**ⁿbri**
chicken	ɣra	χsó-vjá	?	**wə-rja**	**ɣə́-ra**	pa-kuʔ	pɣe
yellow	rȵə-rȵə	**ʁrɲə̀ʶ**	**rȵə̀-rȵə́**	**rɲə**	**rɲə**	**ʁrɲəɣ**	kə-qɐ-**rŋɛʔ**
bitter	sȵa-sȵa	**sɲáʶ**	**sɲà**	**sɲæ**	**sɲa**	tʃʰaχ	kə-qjev
eat	ⁿgə	dzə́	dzə́	dzi	**ⁿgə** ~ tsə	dzeʔ	ⁿdze
ill	ŋo	**ŋò**	**ŋú**	**ŋwa**	**ŋo**	ⁿge	nⁿgiʔ
sleep	rgə	ⁿjáp ~ **rgə́**	**rgə́**	**rgə**	**rgə**	jəv	**rⁿgu**
one	ro	**réɣ**	**ré**	**raw**	**rəɣ**	**rʌɣ**	cet
ten	zʁa	**zʁàʶ**	**zʁò**	**zʁa**	**zʁa**	**sɣə(t)**	**sqeʔ**

Beaudouin (2023a: 95, 209) shows that most of these cognates can be found in Tangut, and that there is a tonal correspondence between most of the tones of Rtsangkhog and Rgyarwagshis Horpa and those of Tangut.

Gloss	Tangut	Northern Horpa (Rtsangkhog 宗科)	Western Horpa (Rgyarwagshis 甲拉西)	Khroskyabs (Wobzi)
Tone 1
one	𘈩 lew**¹**	**réɣ**	**ré**	rɑ̂ɣ
eat	𗡅 dzʲi**¹**	**dzə́**	**dzə́**	dzî
sleep	𗫠 gʲwɨr**¹**	**rgə́**	**rgə́**	jə̂
horse	𘆝 rʲijr**¹**	rì	**rjí**	bró
Tone 2
sun	𗾔 be**²**	**ʁɟə̀**	**ɣbə̀**	jnə́
water	𗋽 zʲɨ̠r**²**	**ɡrə̀**	**ɣrə̀**	jdə̂
person	𘓐 dzʲwo**²**	**vdzì**	**vdzì**	vɟú
liver	𗮰 sʲi**²**	**sʰə̀**	**sʰə̀**	fsé
yellow	𗘩 nər**²**	**ʁrɲə̀ʶ**	**rᶇə̀**-rᶇə́	ʁrɲə̂ɣ
ten	𗰗 ɣạ**²**	**zʁàʶ**	**zʁò**	sjə̂
ill	𗥓 ŋo**²**	**ŋò**	ŋú	ŋə̂m
heart	𗤶 zʲɨr**²** “pulse”	**zɟwàʶ**	/	sjɑ́r
chicken	𗀝𗡗 wor**¹**ˑja̠r**²**	χsó-vjá	/	/
mouth	𗢸 lʲa̠**²**	/	ɬó	/
Tone match
100%		78.57%	71.42%	40% | 50%

Jacques et al. (2017) list the following words as lexical innovations shared by Stau and Khroskyabs (Lavrung), but not by the Core rGyalrong languages.

Gloss	Stau	Khroskyabs	Japhug
heart	zjar	sjɑ̂r	tɯ-sni
smoke	mkʰə	mkʰə́	tɤ-kʰɯ
be big	cʰe	cʰæ̂	wxti
bread	ləkʰi	lækʰí	qajɣi
writing	tɕədə	dʑədə́	tɤscoz
wind	χpərju	χpə̂rju	qale
skin	tɕədʑa	dʑədʑɑ̂	tɯ-ndʐi
water	ɣrə	jdə̂	tɯ-ci
experience	zdar	zdɑ̂r	rɲo
general classifier	ə-lɞ	ə̂-lo	tɯ-rdoʁ
human classifier	a-ʁi	ə̂-ʁæi	tɯ-rdoʁ
exist (animate)	ci/ɟi	ɟê	tu
exist (be put on)	stʰə	stî	tu

== Grammar ==
Shangzhai Horpa (Puxi Shangzhai) is a dialect of the Horpa language noted by a single consistently non-syllabic causative prefix "s-", which exerts pressure on the already elaborate onset system and triggers multiple phonological adjustments (Sun 2007). Gexi Horpa language not only has split verbal agreement system like rGyalrong but also has a hybrid system involving a more intricate interplay of functional and syntactic factors (Sun 2013). The verbs in the rGyalrongic family are marked for person and agreement, and Horpa language also has subtype of hierarchical agreement.

Stau is often used as an alternative name for Horpa, but in fact Stau is one of several Horpa languages (Jacques et al. 2014). The Stau language is primarily spoken in Daofu County of Ganzi Prefecture, but is also spoken in the southeastern corner of Luhuo County and in the village of Dangling of western Danba County. Currently Jesse P. Gates is writing a comprehensive grammar of the Stau language (Gates to appear). Other articles on aspects of Stau grammar include Gates (2017), Gates & Kim (2018), Gates et al. (2019), and Gates et al. (2022).

Stau (Horpa) language follows some traits of the Tibetan language (Bradley 2012). As a Qiangic language, Horpa has unique verb inflection and morphology such as the strategy of inverting the aspiration feature in the formation of the past and progressive stem(s) (Sun 2000).

== Examples ==
Verb agreement The Horpa verb agrees with its subject. For example, zbəcʰa-i [zbəcʰe], means ‘you beat’, and zbəcʰa-u [zbəcʰo], means, 'I beat’.

== See also ==
- Horpa (Zongke) word list (Wiktionary)
