= Dangba Township, Sichuan =

Dangba Township 党坝乡
- Township
- Dangbaxiang
- Location in Sichuan
- Coordinates: 31°39′31″N 102°18′19″E
- Country: People's Republic of China
- Province: Sichuan
- Autonomous prefecture: Ngawa Tibetan and Qiang Autonomous Prefecture
- County: Barkam

Area
  - Total: 328.5 km^{2} (126.8 sq mi)

Population (2010)
  - Total: 2,698
  - Density: 8.213/km^{2} (21.27/sq mi)
- Time zone: UTC+8 (China Standard)

Dangba (Chinese: 党坝乡; Tibetan: དམ་པ, Wylie: dam pa) is a township in Barkam, Ngawa Tibetan and Qiang Autonomous Prefecture, Sichuan, China. In 2010, Dangba Township had a total population of 2,698: 1,469 males and 1,229 females: 377 aged under 14, 1,960 aged between 15 and 65 and 361 aged over 65.

== See also ==
- List of township-level divisions of Sichuan
