= Hedong Township, Jinchuan County =

Hedong Township 河东乡
- Township
- Location in Sichuan
- Coordinates: 31°24′49″N 102°03′03″E
- Country: People's Republic of China
- Province: Sichuan
- Autonomous prefecture: Ngawa
- County: Jinchuan
- Village-level divisions: 4 villages
- Elevation: 2,176 m (7,139 ft)
- Time zone: UTC+8 (China Standard)
- Area code: 0837

Hedong Township (simplified Chinese: 河东乡; traditional Chinese: 河東鄉; pinyin: Hédōng Xiāng; lit. 'river east'; Tibetan: ཧོ་ཏུང་ཡུལ་ཚོ།, Wylie: ho tung yul tsho) is a township of Jinchuan County, in the southwest of Ngawa Tibetan and Qiang Autonomous Prefecture in northwestern Sichuan province, China, located 7 kilometres (4.3 mi) southwest of the county seat. As of 2018, it has four villages under its administration.
