= Qingning Township =

Qingning Township 庆宁乡
- Township
- Location in Sichuan
- Coordinates: 31°33′19″N 102°3′36″E
- Country: People's Republic of China
- Province: Sichuan
- Autonomous county: Ngawa Tibetan and Qiang Autonomous Prefecture
- County: Jinchuan County
- Time zone: UTC+8 (China Standard)

Qingning Township (simplified Chinese: 庆宁乡; traditional Chinese: 慶寧鄉; pinyin: Qìngníng Xiāng; Tibetan: ཆེན་ཉིང་ཡུལ་ཚོ།, Wylie: chen nying yul tsho) is a township in Jinchuan County, Sichuan, China. As of 2020, it administers the following three villages:

- Qingning Village
- Tuanjie Village (团结村)
- Xinsha Village (新沙村)
