= Qingning, Dazhou =

Qingning 青宁镇
- Town
- Location in Sichuan
- Coordinates: 31°29′57″N 107°26′20″E
- Country: People's Republic of China
- Province: Sichuan
- Prefecture-level city: Dazhou
- District: Tongchuan District
- Time zone: UTC+8 (China Standard)

Qingning (Chinese: 青宁; pinyin: Qīngníng) is a town under the administration of Tongchuan District, Dazhou, Sichuan, China. As of 2020, it administers Qingning Residential Community and the following six villages:

- Huama Village (化马村)
- Qianli Village (潜力村)
- Changti Village (长梯村)
- Yanmen Village (岩门村)
- Tianduan Village (天断村)
- Hongzhuan Village (红专村)
