= Barkam (town) =

Barkam 马尔康镇 · འབར་ཁམས་རྡལ། · Muerkvua zhen
- Town
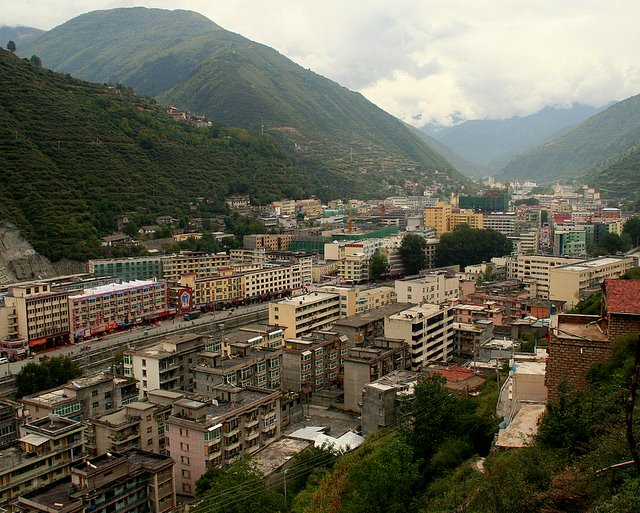
- Overview of the town of Barkam

- Location in Sichuan
- Coordinates: 31°54′07″N 102°13′03″E
- Country: People's Republic of China
- Province: Sichuan
- Prefecture: Ngawa
- County-level city: Barkam
- Postal code: 624000
- Area code: 837

Barkam

Chinese name
- Simplified Chinese: 马尔康
- Traditional Chinese: 馬爾康
Transcriptions
Standard Mandarin
- Hanyu Pinyin: Mǎ'ěrkāng

Tibetan name
- Tibetan: འབར་ཁམས།
Transcriptions
- Wylie: 'bar khams
- Tibetan Pinyin: Barkam

Barkam (simplified Chinese: 马尔康镇; traditional Chinese: 馬爾康鎮; pinyin: Mǎ'ěrkāng Zhèn, Standard Tibetan: འབར་ཁམས་གྲོང་རྡལ།, romanized: ʼbar khams grong rdal, Qiang: Bbadh kangw seqea) is a town in and the seat of the county-level city of Barkam, in the Ngawa Tibetan and Qiang Autonomous Prefecture, in the northwest of Sichuan province, China.

== Toponymy ==
Barkam comes from the Tibetan "place of strong fire" and, by extension, "place of prosperity".

== History ==
On December 18, 2019, the Department of Civil Affairs of Sichuan Province approved the merger of the now-defunct town of Zhuokeji into the town of Barkam.

== Climate ==
Due to its elevation, Barkam lies in the transition between a subtropical highland climate (Köppen Cwb) and humid continental climate (Köppen Dwb), with strong monsoonal influences; winters are frosty and summers warm with frequent rain. The monthly 24-hour average temperature ranges from −0.5 °C (31.1 °F) in December and January to 16.4 °C (61.5 °F) in July, while the annual mean is 8.75 °C (47.7 °F). Nearly two-thirds of the annual precipitation of 784 mm (30.9 in) occurs from June to September. With monthly percent possible sunshine ranging from 36% in June to 65% in December, the town receives 2,133 hours of bright sunshine annually. Diurnal temperature variation is large, averaging 16.0 °C (28.8 °F) annually.

Climate data for Barkam, elevation 2,664 m (8,740 ft), (1991–2020 normals, extremes 1953–present)
Month	Jan	Feb	Mar	Apr	May	Jun	Jul	Aug	Sep	Oct	Nov	Dec	Year
Record high °C (°F)	22.1 (71.8)	24.8 (76.6)	29.2 (84.6)	31.3 (88.3)	34.7 (94.5)	35.7 (96.3)	35.5 (95.9)	36.3 (97.3)	33.3 (91.9)	30.6 (87.1)	23.3 (73.9)	19.3 (66.7)	36.3 (97.3)
Mean daily maximum °C (°F)	11.1 (52.0)	14.4 (57.9)	17.0 (62.6)	19.9 (67.8)	22.5 (72.5)	23.9 (75.0)	25.6 (78.1)	25.8 (78.4)	23.1 (73.6)	18.8 (65.8)	15.3 (59.5)	11.0 (51.8)	19.0 (66.2)
Daily mean °C (°F)	−0.2 (31.6)	3.4 (38.1)	6.8 (44.2)	10.1 (50.2)	12.9 (55.2)	15.1 (59.2)	16.6 (61.9)	16.3 (61.3)	13.7 (56.7)	9.2 (48.6)	4.1 (39.4)	−0.2 (31.6)	9.0 (48.2)
Mean daily minimum °C (°F)	−7.3 (18.9)	−4.0 (24.8)	−0.3 (31.5)	3.2 (37.8)	6.6 (43.9)	10.0 (50.0)	11.3 (52.3)	10.9 (51.6)	8.8 (47.8)	4.1 (39.4)	−2.3 (27.9)	−6.8 (19.8)	2.9 (37.1)
Record low °C (°F)	−18.3 (−0.9)	−16.3 (2.7)	−12.6 (9.3)	−6.9 (19.6)	−2.2 (28.0)	0.1 (32.2)	2.2 (36.0)	1.5 (34.7)	−1.6 (29.1)	−6.2 (20.8)	−11.6 (11.1)	−16.6 (2.1)	−18.3 (−0.9)
Average precipitation mm (inches)	3.3 (0.13)	7.8 (0.31)	27.4 (1.08)	57.4 (2.26)	115.6 (4.55)	164.4 (6.47)	130.0 (5.12)	105.2 (4.14)	122.2 (4.81)	78.1 (3.07)	11.5 (0.45)	3.1 (0.12)	826 (32.51)
Average precipitation days (≥ 0.1 mm)	2.5	5.6	10.5	14.9	20.5	22.7	19.6	17.7	18.9	16.3	5.4	2.2	156.8
Average snowy days	4.1	6.8	6.4	1.9	0.6	0	0	0	0	0.9	2.9	3.3	26.9
Average relative humidity (%)	45	44	50	56	65	74	75	74	77	74	59	50	62
Mean monthly sunshine hours	196.8	175.6	184.1	185.1	181.6	147.5	167.8	173.6	155.9	156.0	186.7	200.7	2,111.4
Percentage possible sunshine	61	56	49	47	42	35	39	43	43	45	60	64	49
Source 1: China Meteorological Administrationextremes
Source 2: Weather China

== Administrative divisions ==
The town of Barkam administers the following 3 residential communities (Chinese: 社区; pinyin: Shè Qū) and 11 administrative villages (Chinese: 行政村; pinyin: Xíngzhèng Cūn):

- Majiang Community (Chinese: 马江社区)
- Meigu Community (Chinese: 美谷社区)
- Dasa Community (Chinese: 达萨社区)
- Adi Village (Chinese: 阿底村)
- Chabei Village (Chinese: 查北村)
- Muye Village (Chinese: 牧业村)
- E'erya Village (Chinese: 俄尔雅村)
- Mola Village (Chinese: 莫拉村)
- Yingboluo Village (Chinese: 英波洛村)
- Benzhen Village (Chinese: 本真村)
- Dengjia Village (Chinese: 邓家村)
- Nazu Village (Chinese: 纳足村)
- Xisuo Village (Chinese: 西索村)
- Chami Village (Chinese: 查米村)

== Demographics ==
As of the 2010 Chinese Census, before it absorbed the now-defunct town of Zhuokeji, Barkam had a population of 29,535. The combined population of Barkam and Zhuokeji totaled 30,547. Barkam had a population of 25,337 as of the 2000 Chinese Census.
