= West Gyalrongic languages =

Branch of the Gyalrongic languages of Sino-Tibetan

West Gyalrongic
- Geographic distribution: China
- Linguistic classification: Sino-Tibetan: Tibeto-Burman; Qiangic; Gyalrongic; West Gyalrongic
- Subdivisions: Khroskyabs; Horpa; †Tangut

Language codes
- Glottolog: west2973 (West Gyalrongic)

The West Gyalrongic languages constitute a group of Gyalrongic languages. On the basis of both morphological and lexical evidence, Lai et al. (2020) adds the extinct Tangut language to West Gyalrongic. Beaudouin (2023) through a morphosyntactic analysis based on phonetic correspondences, shows that Tangut should be included within the Horpa languages.

- Khroskyabs (formerly known as Lavrung)
- Horpa
  - †Tangut

== History ==
Sagart et al. (2019) estimate that West and East Gyalrongic had diverged from each other about 3,000 years before present.

Although Tangut is most commonly associated with Yinchuan, the capital of the Tangut Empire, Zhoushan (周山, Zhōushān) in Jinchuan County (Chinese: 金川縣 Jīnchuān Xiàn, Written Tibetan: Chuchen; roughly located between the territories of Khroskyabs and Situ speakers today) had a historically attested population of Tangut people in 945 AD. As a result, based on both historiographical and linguistic evidence, Lai et al. (2020) place the ultimate homeland of the Tangut in present-day western Sichuan.

However, the Tangut were already rulers of the Dingnan Jiedushi from 881AD, which indicates another scenario, as they could not migrate to a place they were already situated.
