= Jinchuan County =

Jinchuan County 金川县 • ཆུ་ཆེན་རྫོང་། Quqên, Dajinchuan
- County
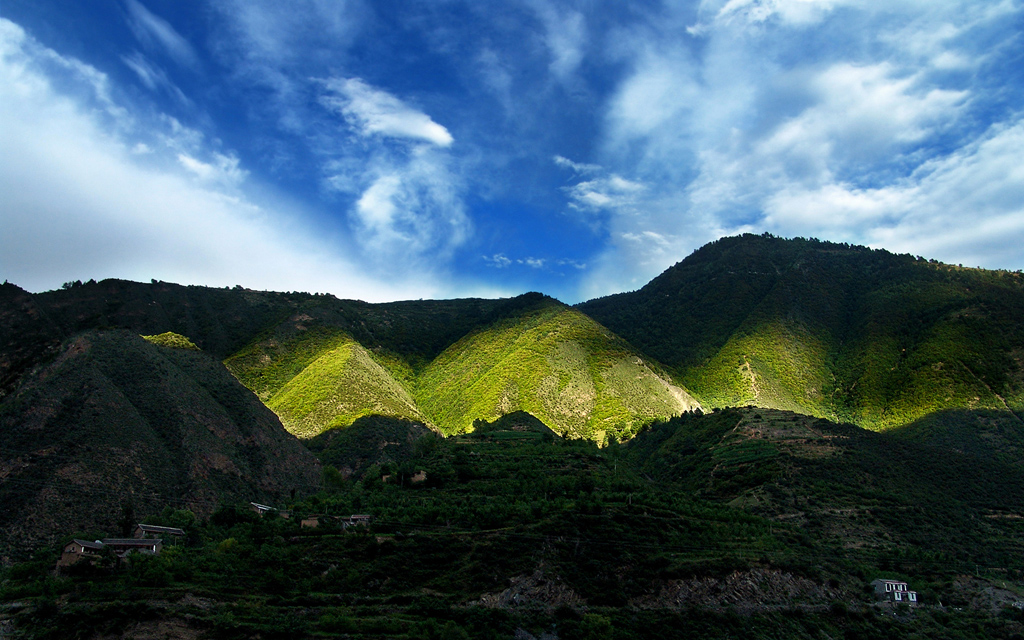
- Landscape near Jinchuan County

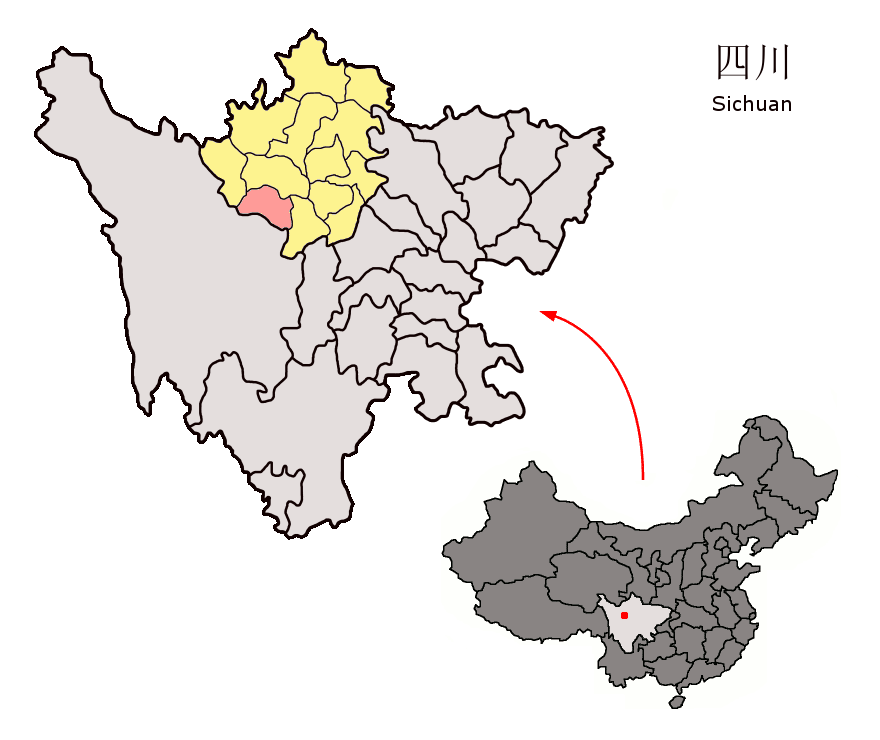
- Location of Jinchuan County (pink) and Ngawa Prefecture (yellow) within Sichuan Province

- Location in Sichuan Jinchuan (China)
- Coordinates: 31.476°N 102.064°E
- Country: China
- Province: Sichuan
- Autonomous prefecture: Ngawa
- Seat: Dowu (Lewu)

Area
  - Total: 5,524 km^{2} (2,133 sq mi)

Population (2020)
  - Total: 58,068
  - Density: 10.51/km^{2} (27.23/sq mi)
- Time zone: UTC+8 (China Standard)
- Website: www.abjinchuan.gov.cn

Jinchuan County

Chinese name
- Simplified Chinese: 金川县
- Traditional Chinese: 金川縣
Transcriptions
Standard Mandarin
- Hanyu Pinyin: Jīnchuān Xiàn
Yue: Cantonese
- Jyutping: gam^{1} cyun^{1} jyun^{6}

Tibetan name
- Tibetan: ཆུ་ཆེན་རྫོང་།
Transcriptions
- Wylie: chu chen rdzong
- Tibetan Pinyin: Quqên Zong

Jinchuan County or Quqên (Tibetan: ཆུ་ཆེན་རྫོང་།; Chinese: 金川县) is a county in the northwest of Sichuan Province, China. It is under the administration of the Ngawa Tibetan and Qiang Autonomous Prefecture. The seat of county is Dowu Town (Lewu (Note: Merged from Jinchuan Town (Rabden) and Dowu Township (Lewu) in 2016.)).

The county spans an area of 5,524 square kilometers, and has a population of about 73,000 as of 2019.

== Administrative divisions ==
The county is divided into 3 towns and 15 townships. These township-level divisions are further divided into 112 village-level divisions.

Name	Simplified Chinese	Hanyu Pinyin	Tibetan	Wylie	Administrative division code
Towns
Guangyinqiao Town (Tugqên)	观音桥镇	Guānyīnqiáo Zhèn	ཐུགས་ཆེན་གྲོང་རྡལ།	thugs chen grong rdal	513226101
Anning Town (Anxing)	安宁镇	Ānníng Zhèn	ཨན་ཞིང་གྲོང་རྡལ།	an zhing grong rdal	513226102
Dowu Town (Lewu)	勒乌镇	Lèwū Zhèn	མདོ་བུ་གྲོང་རྡལ།	mdo bu grong rdal	513226103
Manai Town (Manê)	马奈镇	Mǎnài Zhèn	མ་ནེ་གྲོང་རྡལ།	ma ne grong rdal	513226104
Townships
Sai Township (Sha'er)	沙耳乡	Shā'ěr Xiāng	གསལ་ཡུལ་ཚོ།	gsal yul tsho	513226200
Qingning Township (Qênnying)	庆宁乡	Qìngníng Xiāng	ཆེན་ཉིང་ཡུལ་ཚོ།	chen nying yul tsho	513226201
Kor Township (Ge'er)	咯尔乡	Gē'ěr Xiāng	གོར་ཡུལ་ཚོ།	gor yul tsho	513226202
Hedong Township (Hodung)	河东乡	Hédōng Xiāng	ཧོ་ཏུང་ཡུལ་ཚོ།	ho tung yul tsho	513226205
Hexi Township (Hoxi)	河西乡	Héxī Xiāng	ཧོ་ཞི་ཡུལ་ཚོ།	ho zhi yul tsho	513226206
Gyêmo Township (Jimu)	集沐乡	Jímù Xiāng	ཀྱེ་མོ་ཡུལ་ཚོ།	kye mo yul tsho	513226207
Sawa'gyo Township (Sawargyo, Sawajiao)	撒瓦脚乡	Sāwǎjiǎo Xiāng	ས་བར་ཀྱོ་ཡུལ་ཚོ།	sa bar kyo yul tsho	513226208
Kara'gyo Township (Kalajiao)	卡拉脚乡	Kǎlājiǎo Xiāng	ཁ་ར་ཀྱོ་ཡུལ་ཚོ།	kha ra kyo yul tsho	513226209
Osi Township (Ere)	俄热乡	Érè Xiāng	འོ་བཟི་ཡུལ་ཚོ།	vo bzi yul tsho	513226210
Ganai Township (Ergali)	二嘎里乡	Èrgālǐ Xiāng	དགའ་གནས་ཡུལ་ཚོ།	dgav gnas yul tsho	513226212
Akori Township (Akeli)	阿科里乡	Ākēlǐ Xiāng	ཨ་ཁོ་རི་ཡུལ་ཚོ།	a kho ri yul tsho	513226213
Karsa Township (Kasa)	卡撒乡	Kǎsà Xiāng	མཁར་ས་ཡུལ་ཚོ།	mkhar sa yul tsho	513226215
Zênda Township (Zengda)	曾达乡	Zēngdá Xiāng	རྩེ་མདའ་ཡུལ་ཚོ།	rtse mdav yul tsho	513226216
Josum Township (Dusong)	独松乡	Dúsōng Xiāng	རྗོ་གསུམ་ཡུལ་ཚོ།	rjo gsum yul tsho	513226217
Basi Township (Maori)	毛日乡	Máorì Xiāng	འབའ་ཟི་ཡུལ་ཚོ།	vbav zi yul tsho	513226220

== History ==
Prior to the 18th century, Greater Jinchuan was ruled by the Gyalrong Tibetan Chiefdom of Chuchen. In 1700, the kingdom of Trokyap submitted to the Qing rule. From 1747 to 1776, the Qing dynasty launched the Jinchuan campaigns to suppress the Jinchuan chiefdoms.

The county briefly belonged to the Revolutionary Government of Republic of Kerutetsa until 1935. In 1950, the People's Liberation Army conquered the county. The county was briefly renamed Dajinchuan County (simplified Chinese: 大金川县; traditional Chinese: 大金川縣) from 1953 to June 1959.

== Geography ==
The county is bordered by Barkam to the north, Xiaojin County to the east, Zamtang County to the west, and Dawu County and Danba County to the south.

The county lies within the Dadu River basin. 42% of the county is forested.

=== Climate ===
Climate data for Jinchuan, elevation 2,169 m (7,116 ft), (1991–2020 normals, extremes 1981–present)
Month	Jan	Feb	Mar	Apr	May	Jun	Jul	Aug	Sep	Oct	Nov	Dec	Year
Record high °C (°F)	20.7 (69.3)	27.8 (82.0)	30.9 (87.6)	35.0 (95.0)	38.7 (101.7)	36.6 (97.9)	38.1 (100.6)	38.0 (100.4)	35.9 (96.6)	33.3 (91.9)	25.8 (78.4)	18.5 (65.3)	38.7 (101.7)
Mean daily maximum °C (°F)	12.3 (54.1)	16.5 (61.7)	20.6 (69.1)	23.5 (74.3)	25.9 (78.6)	26.8 (80.2)	28.8 (83.8)	29.2 (84.6)	25.8 (78.4)	21.3 (70.3)	17.0 (62.6)	12.5 (54.5)	21.7 (71.0)
Daily mean °C (°F)	2.7 (36.9)	6.8 (44.2)	11.1 (52.0)	14.2 (57.6)	16.8 (62.2)	18.6 (65.5)	20.2 (68.4)	20.2 (68.4)	17.4 (63.3)	12.8 (55.0)	7.4 (45.3)	2.8 (37.0)	12.6 (54.6)
Mean daily minimum °C (°F)	−3.4 (25.9)	0.1 (32.2)	4.3 (39.7)	7.5 (45.5)	10.8 (51.4)	13.8 (56.8)	15.3 (59.5)	15.2 (59.4)	13.0 (55.4)	8.4 (47.1)	1.7 (35.1)	−3.0 (26.6)	7.0 (44.6)
Record low °C (°F)	−9.7 (14.5)	−6.9 (19.6)	−5.7 (21.7)	0.3 (32.5)	2.1 (35.8)	5.9 (42.6)	8.0 (46.4)	7.2 (45.0)	5.2 (41.4)	−1.2 (29.8)	−6.1 (21.0)	−10.7 (12.7)	−10.7 (12.7)
Average precipitation mm (inches)	2.1 (0.08)	6.0 (0.24)	19.7 (0.78)	51.9 (2.04)	97.5 (3.84)	153.8 (6.06)	119.1 (4.69)	94.9 (3.74)	117.5 (4.63)	67.1 (2.64)	8.9 (0.35)	1.3 (0.05)	739.8 (29.14)
Average precipitation days (≥ 0.1 mm)	1.7	3.7	8.8	13.5	19.3	22.3	18.6	16.1	17.8	15.7	4.2	1.3	143
Average snowy days	2.3	2.9	0.6	0.1	0	0	0	0	0	0	0.4	1.1	7.4
Average relative humidity (%)	50	45	46	54	62	72	72	70	75	74	64	56	62
Mean monthly sunshine hours	182.3	169.5	191.6	197.8	200.8	165.2	181.9	190.6	163.9	167.3	175.1	184.9	2,170.9
Percentage possible sunshine	57	54	51	51	47	39	42	47	45	48	56	59	50
Source: China Meteorological Administrationall-time November record high
