= Barkam =

Barkam 马尔康市 · འབར་ཁམས་གྲོང་ཁྱེར། · Muerkvua shi Ma'erkang
- County-level city
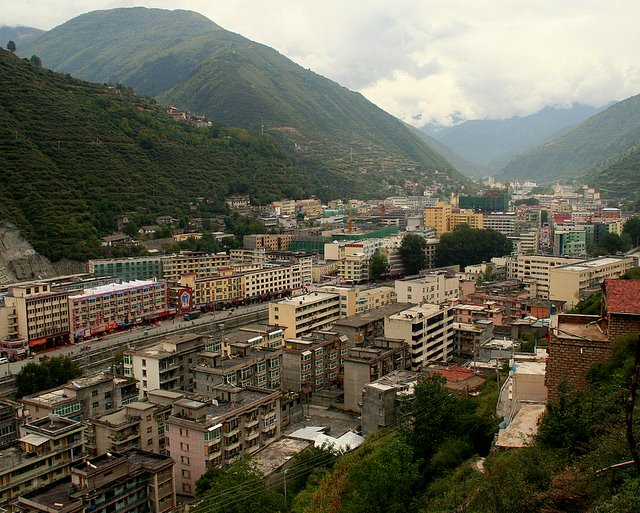
- Overview of the city of Barkam

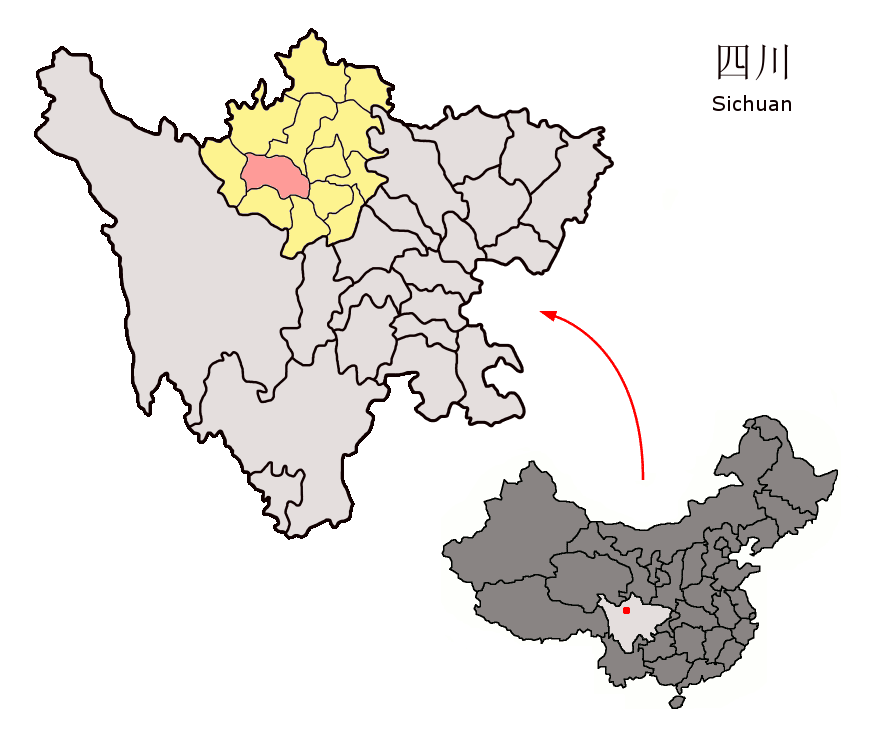
- Barkam City (red) in Ngawa Prefecture (yellow) and Sichuan

- Location of the seat in Sichuan Barkam (China)
- Coordinates (Barkam municipal government): 31°54′21″N 102°12′23″E
- Country: China
- Province: Sichuan
- Autonomous prefecture: Ngawa
- Seat: Barkam Town

Area
  - Total: 6,639 km^{2} (2,563 sq mi)
- Elevation: 2,615 m (8,579 ft)

Population (2020)
  - Total: 58,390
  - Density: 8.795/km^{2} (22.78/sq mi)
- Postal code: 624000
- Area code: 0837
- Website: www.maerkang.gov.cn

Barkam

Chinese name
- Simplified Chinese: 马尔康
- Traditional Chinese: 馬爾康
Transcriptions
Standard Mandarin
- Hanyu Pinyin: Mǎ'ěrkāng

Tibetan name
- Tibetan: འབར་ཁམས།
Transcriptions
- Wylie: 'bar khams
- Tibetan Pinyin: Barkam

Qiang name
- Qiang: Muerkvua

Barkam or Maerkang or Muerkvua is a county-level city in Ngawa Tibetan and Qiang Autonomous Prefecture, in the northwest part of Sichuan province, China. The city seat is the town of Barkam. As of the 2010 Chinese Census, Barkam has a population of 58,437.

== Toponymy ==
Barkam comes from the Tibetan "place of strong fire" and, by extension, "place of prosperity".

== History ==
Historically, Barkam belonged to the Somang Tusi (Chinese: 梭磨土司; pinyin: Suōmó Tǔsī), one of the Gyalrong Tusi. The area was administered as three units: Zhuokeji (Chinese: 卓克基; pinyin: Zhuōkèjī), Zonggag (Chinese: 松岗; pinyin: Sōnggǎng), and Tamba (Chinese: 党坝; pinyin: Dǎngbà).

During the Qin dynasty, the area belonged to Jiandi Dao. It belonged to Wenshan Commandery during the Han dynasty. During the Tang and Song dynasties, the area was part of the Jimi system. The area was governed by the Bureau of Buddhist and Tibetan Affairs during the Yuan dynasty. During the reign of the Yongle Emperor during the Ming dynasty, the area belonged to the Zagu Tusi. During the reign of the Qianlong Emperor of the Qing dynasty, the area was brought under the control of the Lifan Ting. Under the subsequent Jiaqing Emperor, the area was reorganized as the Zagu Ting.

During the Republic of China, the area was organized as Lifan County (Chinese: 理番县; pinyin: Lǐfān Xiàn).

=== People's Republic of China ===
In December 1950, officials from nearby Mao County embarked on a mission to establish temporary governing committees in the area of present-day Barkam. The People's Republic of China established control of the area in August 1951. In September 1951, the area was incorporated as the Situ Aba Provisional Military Government Committee (Chinese: 四土阿坝临时军政委员会; pinyin: Sìtǔ Ābà Línshí Jūnzhèng Wěiyuánhuì). In April 1953, Barkam was organized as the Barkam Office (Chinese: 马尔康办事处; pinyin: Mǎ'ěrkāng Bànshìchù). Barkam was reorganized as a county on April 21, 1956.

In 1957, the areas of Sizhai (Chinese: 四寨), Rangkou (Chinese: 壤口), and Longri (Chinese: 龙日) were moved from Barkam County to nearby Hongyuan County.

In November 2015, the State Council agreed to reorganize Barkam as a county-level city.

On December 18, 2019, the Department of Civil Affairs of Sichuan Province approved the merger of the now-defunct town of Zhuokeji into the town of Barkam.

== Geography ==
Barkam is located within the southwest portion of Ngawa Tibetan and Qiang Autonomous Prefecture, in northwest Sichuan. The city is located on the southern edge of the Northwest Sichuan Plateau. Major rivers that flow through Barkam include the Somang River, the Chabao River (Chinese: 茶堡河; pinyin: Chábǎo Hé), and the Gyomgyo River. Barkam's canyons are densely forested, with major tree genus's including fir, spruce, larch, birch, and oak. Quercus semecarpifolia, a species of oak tree, is present in Barkam.

=== Fauna ===
The forests in the mountains are home to various protected animals such as leopards, Thorold's deer, sika deer, takin, and various birds.

=== Climate ===
Due to its elevation, Barkam lies in the transition between a subtropical highland climate (Köppen Cwb) and humid continental climate (Köppen Dwb), with strong monsoonal influences; winters are frosty and summers warm with frequent rain. The monthly 24-hour average temperature ranges from −0.5 °C (31.1 °F) in December and January to 16.4 °C (61.5 °F) in July, while the annual mean is 8.75 °C (47.7 °F). Nearly two-thirds of the annual precipitation of 784 mm (30.9 in) occurs from June to September. With monthly percent possible sunshine ranging from 36% in June to 65% in December, the town receives 2,133 hours of bright sunshine annually. Diurnal temperature variation is large, averaging 16.0 °C (28.8 °F) annually.

Climate data for Barkam, elevation 2,664 m (8,740 ft), (1991–2020 normals, extremes 1953–present)
| Month | Jan | Feb | Mar | Apr | May | Jun | Jul | Aug | Sep | Oct | Nov | Dec | Year |
|---|---|---|---|---|---|---|---|---|---|---|---|---|---|
| Record high °C (°F) | 22.1 (71.8) | 24.8 (76.6) | 29.2 (84.6) | 31.3 (88.3) | 34.7 (94.5) | 35.7 (96.3) | 35.5 (95.9) | 36.3 (97.3) | 33.3 (91.9) | 30.6 (87.1) | 23.3 (73.9) | 19.3 (66.7) | 36.3 (97.3) |
| Mean daily maximum °C (°F) | 11.1 (52.0) | 14.4 (57.9) | 17.0 (62.6) | 19.9 (67.8) | 22.5 (72.5) | 23.9 (75.0) | 25.6 (78.1) | 25.8 (78.4) | 23.1 (73.6) | 18.8 (65.8) | 15.3 (59.5) | 11.0 (51.8) | 19.0 (66.2) |
| Daily mean °C (°F) | −0.2 (31.6) | 3.4 (38.1) | 6.8 (44.2) | 10.1 (50.2) | 12.9 (55.2) | 15.1 (59.2) | 16.6 (61.9) | 16.3 (61.3) | 13.7 (56.7) | 9.2 (48.6) | 4.1 (39.4) | −0.2 (31.6) | 9.0 (48.2) |
| Mean daily minimum °C (°F) | −7.3 (18.9) | −4.0 (24.8) | −0.3 (31.5) | 3.2 (37.8) | 6.6 (43.9) | 10.0 (50.0) | 11.3 (52.3) | 10.9 (51.6) | 8.8 (47.8) | 4.1 (39.4) | −2.3 (27.9) | −6.8 (19.8) | 2.9 (37.1) |
| Record low °C (°F) | −18.3 (−0.9) | −16.3 (2.7) | −12.6 (9.3) | −6.9 (19.6) | −2.2 (28.0) | 0.1 (32.2) | 2.2 (36.0) | 1.5 (34.7) | −1.6 (29.1) | −6.2 (20.8) | −11.6 (11.1) | −16.6 (2.1) | −18.3 (−0.9) |
| Average precipitation mm (inches) | 3.3 (0.13) | 7.8 (0.31) | 27.4 (1.08) | 57.4 (2.26) | 115.6 (4.55) | 164.4 (6.47) | 130.0 (5.12) | 105.2 (4.14) | 122.2 (4.81) | 78.1 (3.07) | 11.5 (0.45) | 3.1 (0.12) | 826 (32.51) |
| Average precipitation days (≥ 0.1 mm) | 2.5 | 5.6 | 10.5 | 14.9 | 20.5 | 22.7 | 19.6 | 17.7 | 18.9 | 16.3 | 5.4 | 2.2 | 156.8 |
| Average snowy days | 4.1 | 6.8 | 6.4 | 1.9 | 0.6 | 0 | 0 | 0 | 0 | 0.9 | 2.9 | 3.3 | 26.9 |
| Average relative humidity (%) | 45 | 44 | 50 | 56 | 65 | 74 | 75 | 74 | 77 | 74 | 59 | 50 | 62 |
| Mean monthly sunshine hours | 196.8 | 175.6 | 184.1 | 185.1 | 181.6 | 147.5 | 167.8 | 173.6 | 155.9 | 156.0 | 186.7 | 200.7 | 2,111.4 |
| Percentage possible sunshine | 61 | 56 | 49 | 47 | 42 | 35 | 39 | 43 | 43 | 45 | 60 | 64 | 49 |
Source 1: China Meteorological Administrationextremes
Source 2: Weather China

== Administrative divisions ==
Barkam administers the following three towns and 10 townships:

| Name | Simplified Chinese | Pinyin | Tibetan | Wylie | Qiang | Population (2010 Chinese Census) | Administrative division code |
|---|---|---|---|---|---|---|---|
Towns
| Barkam (Mar'erkang) | 马尔康镇 | Mǎ'ěrkāng Zhèn | འབར་ཁམས་གྲོང་རྡལ། | ʼbar khams grong rdal | Bbadh kangw seqea | 30,547 | 513201100 |
| Zonggag (Songgang) | 松岗镇 | Sōnggǎng Zhèn | རྫོང་འགག་གྲོང་རྡལ། | rdzong ʼgag grong rdal | | 2,104 | 513201102 |
| Sarzong (Sha'erzong) | 沙尔宗镇 | Shā'ěrzōng Zhèn | གསར་རྫོང་གྲོང་རྡལ། | gsar rdzong grong rdal | | 2,126 | 513201103 |
Townships
| Somang Township (Suomo) | 梭磨乡 | Suōmó Xiāng | སོ་མང་ཡུལ་ཚོ། | so mang yul tsho | | 2,795 | 513201200 |
| Chagpar Township (Baiwan) | 白湾乡 | Báiwān Xiāng | བྲག་བར་ཡུལ་ཚོ། | brag bar yul tsho | | 2,990 | 513201201 |
| Tamba Township (Dangba) | 党坝乡 | Dǎngbà Xiāng | དམ་པ་ཡུལ་ཚོ། | dam pa yul tsho | | 2,698 | 513201202 |
| Zhongzong Township (Mu'erzong) | 木尔宗乡 | Dǎngbà Xiāng | འབྲོང་རྫོང་ཡུལ་ཚོ། | ʼbrong rdzong yul tsho | | 1,359 | 513201203 |
| Gyomgyo Township (Jiaomuzu, Jomzhu) | 脚木足乡 | Jiǎomùzú Xiāng | ཀྱོམ་ཀྱོ་ཡུལ་ཚོ། | kyom kyo yul tsho | | 3,302 | 513201204 |
| Donggyai Township (Long'erjia) | 龙尔甲乡 | Lóng'ěrjiǎ Xiāng | གདོང་བརྒྱད་ཡུལ་ཚོ། | gdong brgyad yul tsho | | 1,527 | 513201206 |
| Tacang Township (Dazang) | 大藏乡 | Dàzàng Xiāng | ད་ཚང་ཡུལ་ཚོ། | da tshang yul tsho | | 1,067 | 513201207 |
| Kangsar Township (Kangshan) | 康山乡 | Kāngshān Xiāng | ཁང་སར་ཡུལ་ཚོ། | khang sar yul tsho | | 1,599 | 513201208 |
| Codün Township (Caodeng) | 草登乡 | Cǎodēng Xiāng | མཚོ་བདུན་ཡུལ་ཚོ། | tsho bdun yul tsho | | 2,953 | 513201209 |
| Zongbur Township (Ribu) | 日部乡 | Rìbù Xiāng | རྫོང་འབུར་ཡུལ་ཚོ། | rdzong ʼbur yul tsho | | 3,370 | 513201210 |

== Demographics ==
As of the 2010 Chinese Census, Barkam has a population of 58,437. This represents an increase from the 55,046 recorded in the 2000 Chinese Census. Barkam had a population of 54,735 in 1999. In 1996, Barkam had an estimated population of 54,000.

As of 2016 government figures, 77.41% of Barkam is classified as ethnically Tibetan, while 18.09% is ethnically Han Chinese, 2.97% is ethnically Qiang, 1.20% is ethnically Hui, and the remaining 0.34% belong to other ethnic groups.

The area is traditionally inhabited by a branch of Rgyalrong people who speak the Situ language. Chagpar Township hosts a unique dialect of Situ.

== Economy ==
As of 2021, Barkam has a gross domestic product (GDP) of about 4.6 billion renminbi (RMB). This represents an approximate 70% increase from 2016. GDP per capita as of 2021 was approximately 78,000 RMB, also a 70% increase from 2016.

Barkam is home to over 1,300 ingredients used in traditional Chinese medicine, including many derived from local deer, bears, cattle, fungus, and lilies.

== Transport ==
- China National Highway 317
- Sichuan Provincial Highway 210

== Tourism ==
Major historical sites in Barkam include:

- Zhuokeji Tusi Official Village
- Codün Temple
- Zonggag Zhibo Stone Blockhouse Group (Chinese: 松岗直波石碉群; pinyin: Sōnggǎng Zhíbō Shí Diāo Qún)
- Red Army Slogan Stone Inscription (Chinese: 红军标语石刻; pinyin: Hóngjūn Biāoyǔ Shíkè)
- Zhuomu Blockhouse Meeting Site (Chinese: 卓木碉会址; pinyin: Zhuōmù Diāo Huì Zhǐ)
