= Wuchalu Township =

Wuchalu Township 五岔路乡
- Township
- Location of the township region in Mangshi

- Location in Yunnan
- Coordinates: 24.436499°N 98.303131°E
- Country: People's Republic of China
- Province: Yunnan
- Prefecture-level city: Dehong Dai and Jingpo Autonomous Prefecture
- County-level city: Mangshi

Area
  - Total: 202 km^{2} (78 sq mi)

Population (2017)
  - Total: 19,073
  - Density: 94.4/km^{2} (245/sq mi)
- Time zone: UTC+08:00 (China Standard)
- Postal code: 678408
- Area code: 0692

Wuchalu Township (simplified Chinese: 五岔路乡; traditional Chinese: 五岔路鄉; pinyin: Wǔchàlù Xiāng) is a township in Mangshi, Yunnan, China. As of the 2017 census it had a population of 19,073 and an area of 202 square kilometres (78 sq mi). It is surrounded by Wangzishu Township on the north, Jiangdong Township on the northeast, Xishan Township on the west, Xuangang Township on the east, and Santaishan Palaung Ethnic Township on the south.

== Administrative divisions ==
As of December 2015, the township is divided into 6 villages:

- Wuchalu (五岔路村)
- Liangzijie (梁子街村)
- Mangbeng (芒蚌村)
- Wandan (弯丹村)
- Shiban (石板村)
- Xinzhai (新寨村)

== Geography ==
The average annual temperature of the township is 17 °C (63 °F). It belongs to the subtropical mountain climate. The total annual rainfall is 1,300 millimetres (51 in) to 1,600 millimetres (63 in). The forest coverage rate reaches 59.3%. The highest altitude is 1,850 metres (6,070 ft) and the lowest altitude is 800 metres (2,600 ft).

The Longchuan River (龙川江) flows through the township.

== Economy ==
The local economy is primarily based upon agriculture and animal husbandry. Cash crops are mainly sugarcane, tea, nuts, walnuts, sugar oranges, and tobacco.

== Education ==
- Wuchalu Township Central Primary School
- Wuchalu Township Middle School

== Transport ==
The Provincial Highway S318 runs east to west through the township.

The County Road X024 passes across the township north to south.
