= Fengping, Mangshi =

Fengping Town 风平镇
- Town
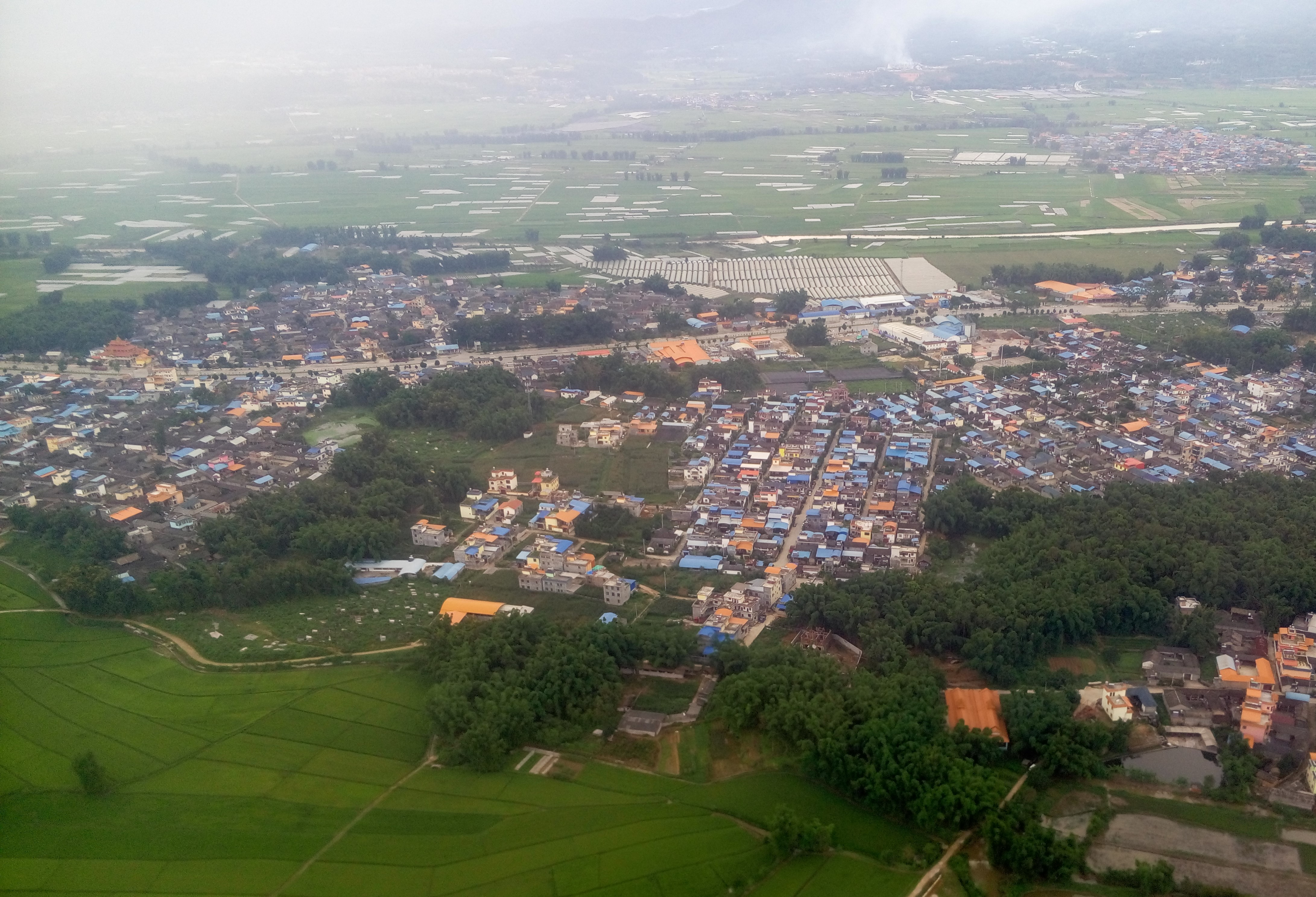
- Buildings in Fengping Town.

- Location of the town region in Mangshi

- Location in Yunnan
- Coordinates: 24.40253°N 98.525225°E
- Country: People's Republic of China
- Province: Yunnan
- Prefecture-level city: Dehong Dai and Jingpo Autonomous Prefecture
- County-level city: Mangshi

Area
  - Total: 394.42 km^{2} (152.29 sq mi)
- Elevation: 863 m (2,831 ft)

Population (2017)
  - Total: 72,733
  - Density: 184.40/km^{2} (477.61/sq mi)
- Time zone: UTC+08:00 (China Standard)
- Postal code: 678407
- Area code: 0692

Fengping (simplified Chinese: 风平镇; traditional Chinese: 風平鎮; pinyin: Fēngpíng Zhèn) is a town in Mangshi, Yunnan, China. As of the 2017 census it had a population of 72,733 and an area of 394.42 square kilometres (152.29 sq mi). The town shares a border with Santaishan Township, Xuangang Township and Mangshi Town to the west and north, Longling County and Zhongshan Township to the east, and Mengga Town to the south.

== Administrative divisions ==
As of December 2015, the town is divided into eleven villages and one community:

- Xingqiao Community (兴侨社区)
- Fengping (风平村)
- Namu (那目村)
- Padi (帕底村)
- Mangbie (芒别村)
- Mangsai (芒赛村)
- Fapa (法帕村)
- Lazhang (腊掌村)
- Zheyan (遮晏村)
- Mangli (芒里村)
- Shangdong (上东村)
- Pinghe (平河村)

== History ==
After the founding of the Communist State in 1953, Fengping District was set up. In May 1954 it was renamed "Meng Community". In February 1957, the Meng Community and Yun Community merged into one named "Mangshiba District". On March 23, 1969, it was renamed "Dongfeng People's Commune". In March 1984, it reverted to its former name of "Fengping District". In December 1987, its name was changed to "Fengping Township". On August 20, 1998, it was upgraded to a town. In November 2005, the former Fapa Town (法帕镇) was merged into Fengping Town.

== Geography ==
The town has an average elevation of 863-metre (2,831 ft).

The Mangshi River (芒市大河), Guolang River (果朗河) and Guangsha River (广砂河) flow through the town.

There are a number of lakes and reservoirs in the town which include Kongque Lake (孔雀湖; 'Peacock Lake'), Mengbanhe Reservoir (勐板河水库), Mangbie Reservoir (芒别水库), Yunmen Reservoir (允门水库), Namu Reservoir (那目水库), and Qingtanghe Reservoir (清塘河水库).

== Economy ==
The local economy is primarily based upon agriculture and animal husbandry. Coffee, lemon, turmeric, bamboo, citrus and sugarcane are the main cash crops.

== Education ==
The town has two public schools: Fengping School and Nongxiang School.

== Attraction ==
Fengping Pagoda (风平佛塔) is a major attraction, it was originally built in 1728 during the region of Yongzheng Emperor of the Qing dynasty (1644–1911).

== Transport ==
Dehong Mangshi Airport serves the town.

The National Highway G320 passes across the town.

The town is connected to two roads: Luying Road (潞盈公路) and Fengfa Road (风法公路).
