= Menghuan Subdistrict =

Menghuan Subdistrict 勐焕街道
- Subdistrict
- Location of the subdistrict region in Mangshi

- Location in Yunnan
- Coordinates: 24.444007°N 98.597476°E
- Country: People's Republic of China
- Province: Yunnan
- Prefecture: Dehong Dai and Jingpo Autonomous Prefecture
- County-level city: Mangshi

Area
  - Total: 23.15 km^{2} (8.94 sq mi)

Population (2017)
  - Total: 171,195
  - Density: 7,395/km^{2} (19,150/sq mi)
- Time zone: UTC+08:00 (China Standard)
- Postal code: 678400
- Area code: 0692

Menghuan Subdistrict (simplified Chinese: 勐焕街道; traditional Chinese: 勐煥街道; pinyin: Měnghuàn Jiēdào) is an urban subdistrict in Mangshi, Yunnan, China. As of the 2017 census it had a population of 171,195 and an area of 23.15 square kilometres (8.94 sq mi). It is the political, economic and cultural center of Mangshi City and Dehong Dai and Jingpo Autonomous Prefecture.

== Administrative divisions ==
As of 2010, the subdistrict is divided into 11 communities:

- Xinanli Community (西南里社区)
- Dongbeili Community (东北里社区)
- Tuanjie Community (团结社区)
- Xincun Community (新村社区)
- Jinhua Community (锦华社区)
- Jianguo Community (建国社区)
- Bingwu Community (丙午社区)
- Sankeshu Community (三棵树社区)
- Jiaolin Community (胶林社区)
- Bingmen Community (丙门社区)
- Chengxi Community (城西社区)

== Etymology ==
In Dai language, "Mangshi" is called "Menghuan", which means "the city of dawn". It is said that Gautama Buddha came here just at dawn, so he named it.

== History ==
In 2007, Menghuan Subdistrict separated from Mangshi Town.

== Geography ==
Mangjiu Reservoir (芒究水库) is a reservoir and the largest body of water in the subdistrict. It is very popular for boating, fishing and camping and is home to many residents from other areas of the province during the summer months.

== Education ==
Dehong Vocational College is located in the subdistrict.

- Secondary school: Dehong No. 1 High School for Nationalities

== Economy ==
The economy is supported primarily by commerce.
