= Mangshi =

Mangshi 芒市
- County-level city

Other transcription(s)
  - Pinyin: Mángshì
  - Tai Nuea: ᥝᥥᥒᥰ ᥛᥫᥒᥰ ᥑᥩᥢᥴ
  - Jingpho: Mangshi Myu
  - Burmese: မန်စီ
  - Thai: เมืองข้อน
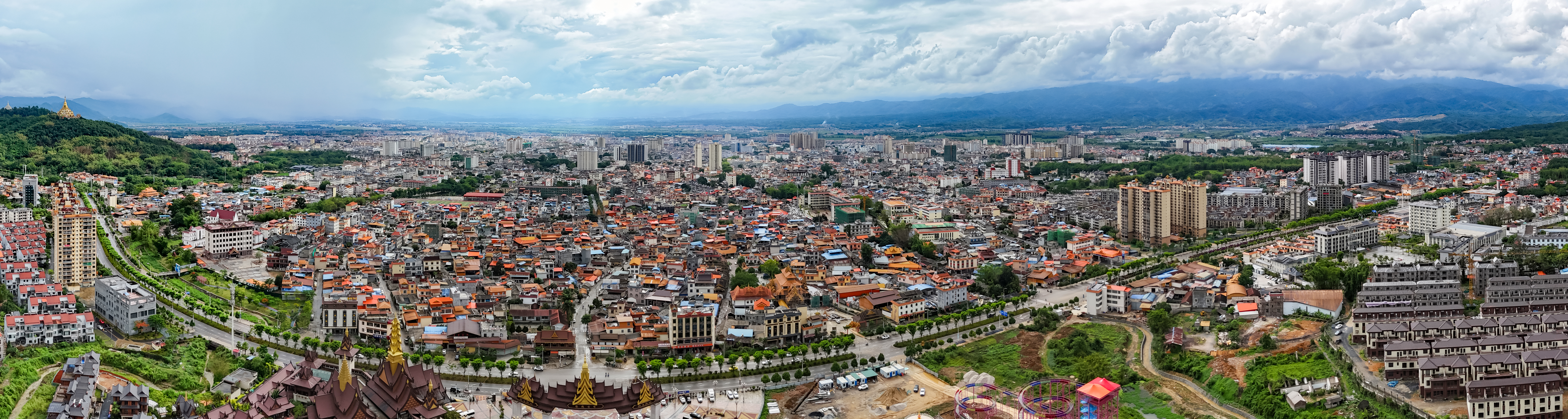
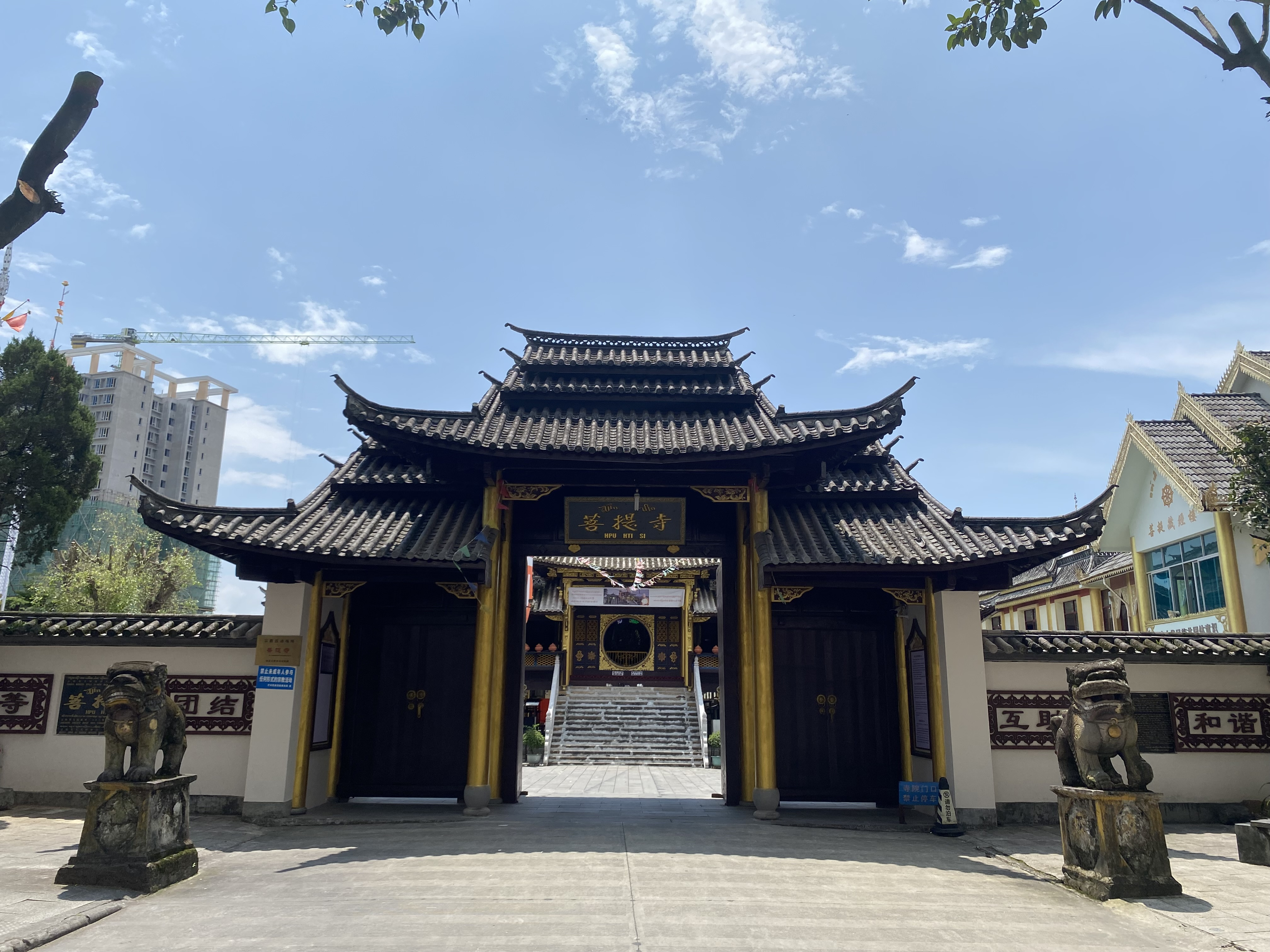
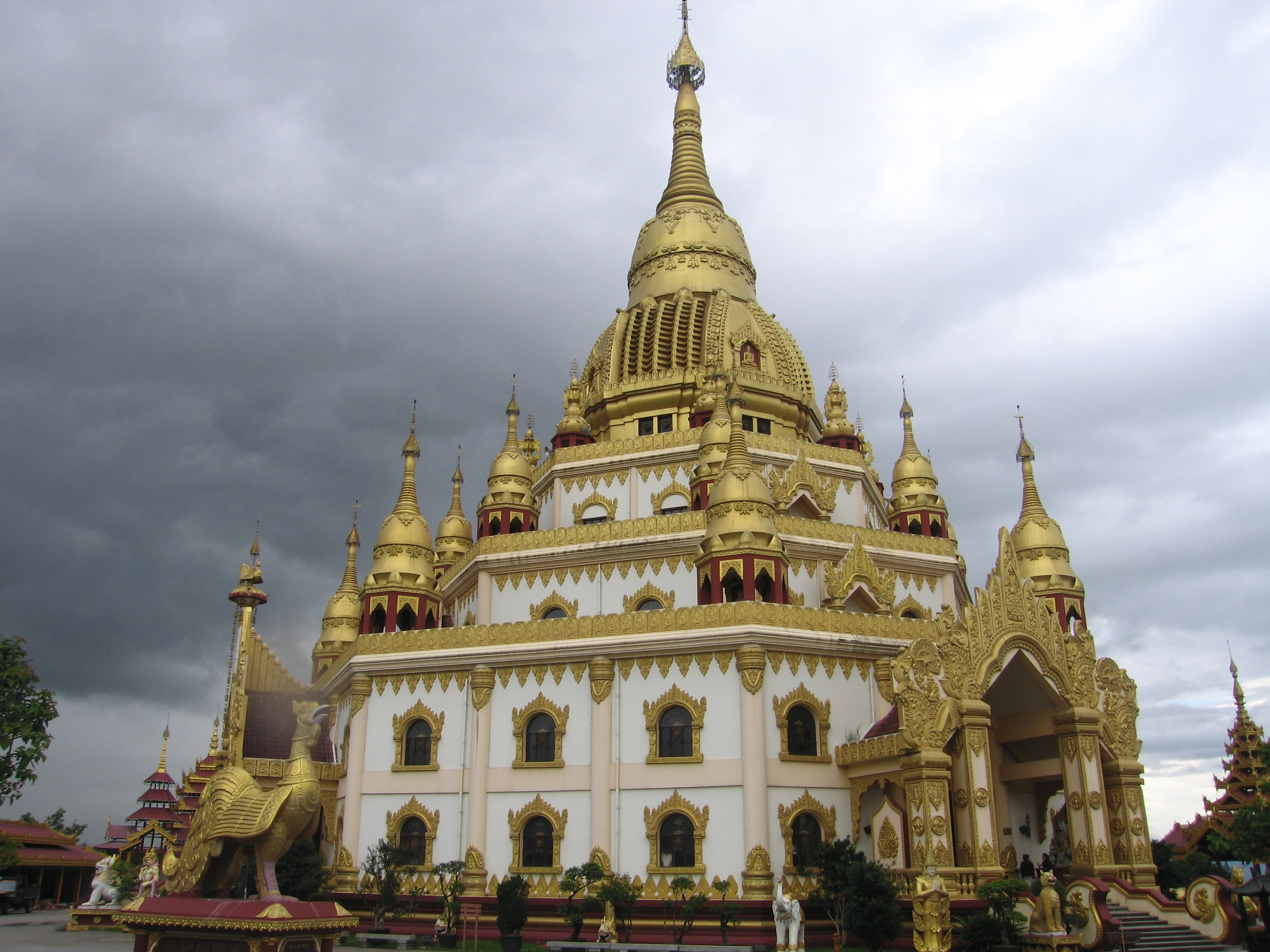
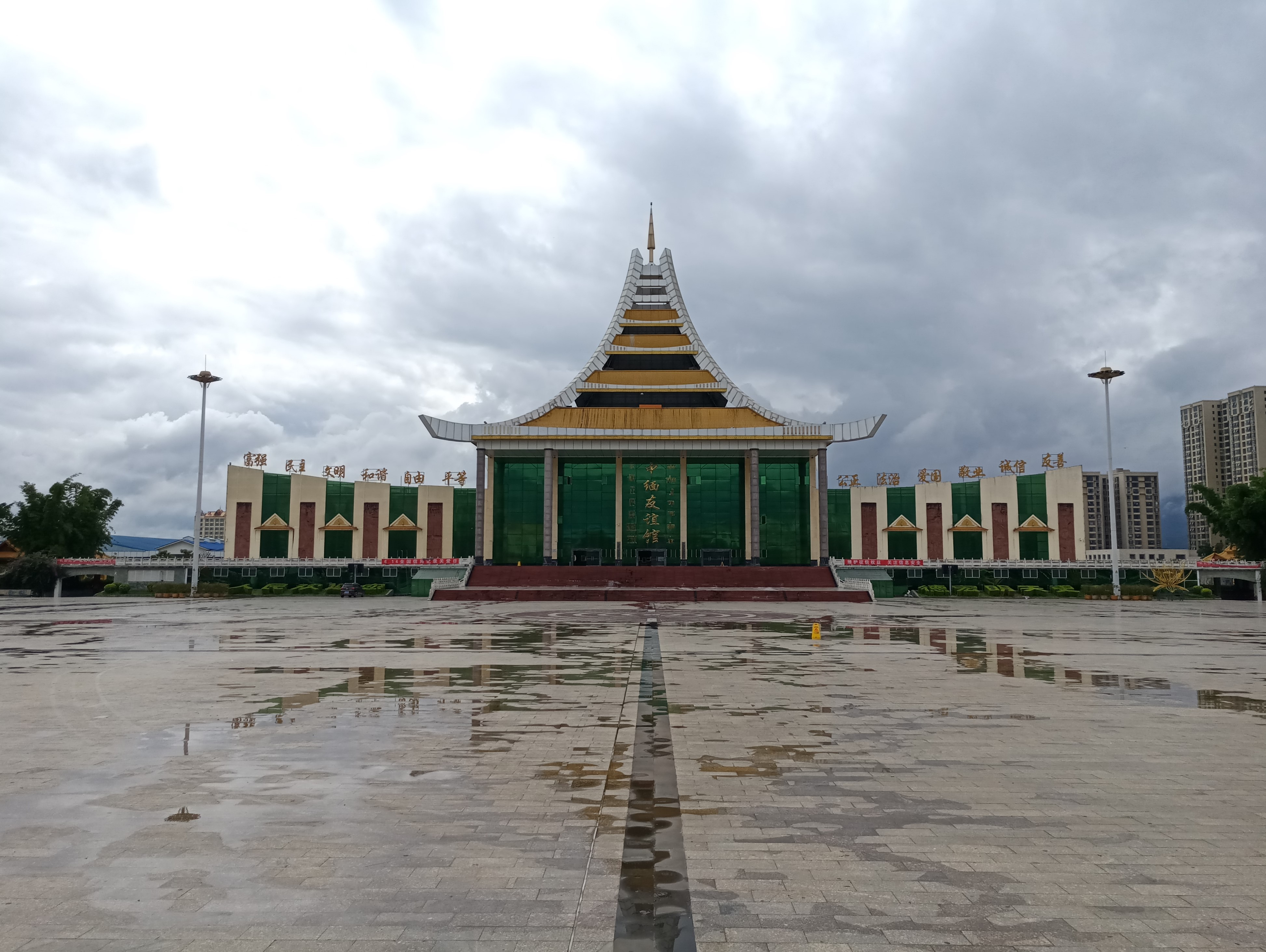
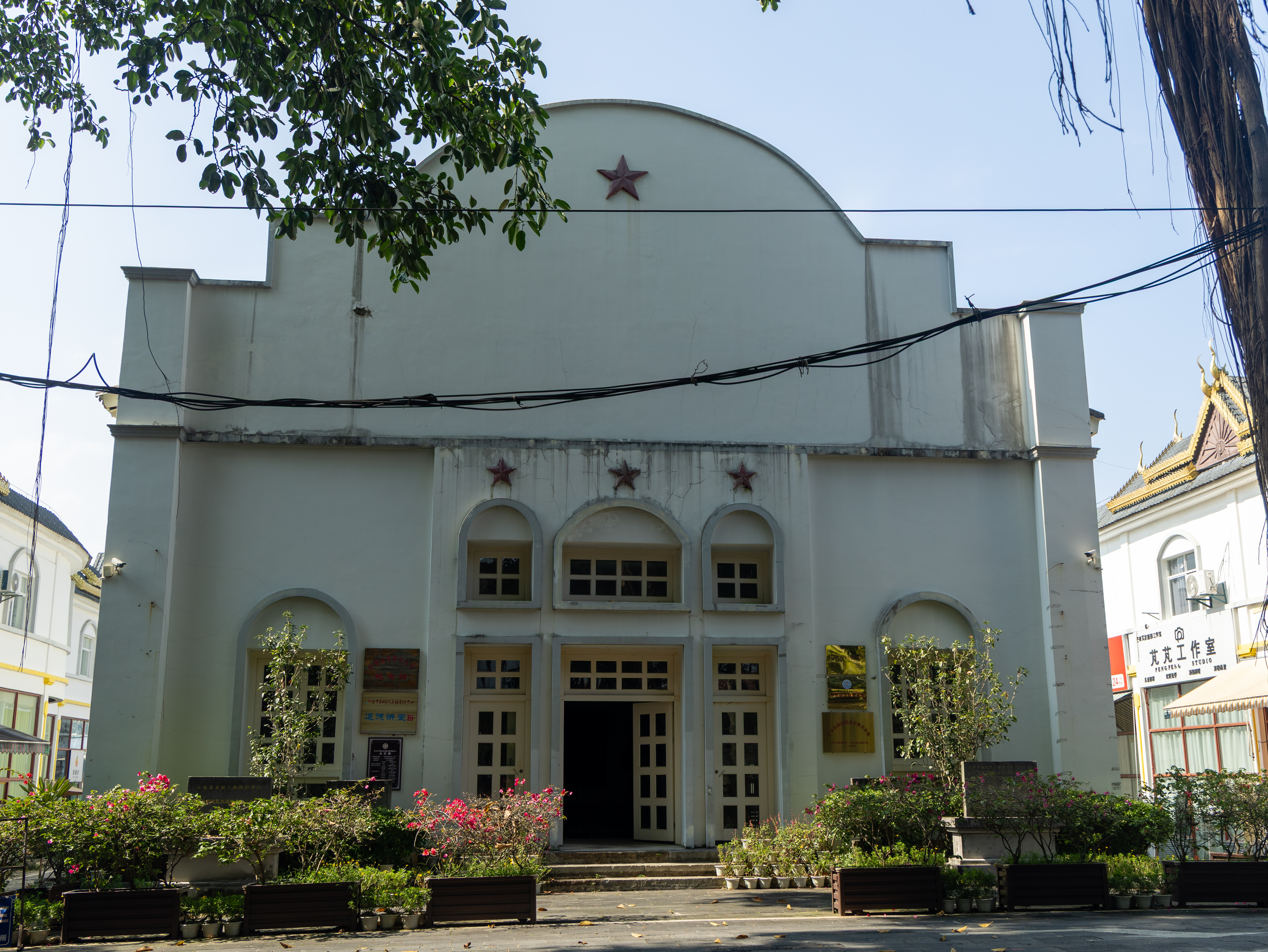
- Urban skyline Puti Temple Mëng Xón Pagoda Mangshi Square Mangshi Little Hall
- Etymology: Evolved form the ethnic name "茫施" (Mangshi)
- Nickname: city of dawn
- Location of Mangshi City in Dehong Prefecture within Yunnan province

- Location in Yunnan Mangshi (China)
- Coordinates (Mangshi government): 24°26′01″N 98°35′17″E
- Country: China
- Province: Yunnan
- Autonomous Prefecture: Dehong
- Founded: 1996
- Municipal seat: Menghuan Subdistrict

Area
  - Total: 2,900.91 km^{2} (1,120.05 sq mi)
- Elevation: 933 m (3,061 ft)

Population (2020 census)
  - Total: 439,931
  - Density: 151.653/km^{2} (392.779/sq mi)
- Time zone: UTC+8 (China Standard)
- Postal code: 678400
- Phone code: (0)692
- Website: www.dhms.gov.cn

Mangshi (Chinese: 芒市; Wade–Giles: Mangshih; Tai Nüa: ᥝᥥᥒᥰ ᥛᥫᥒᥰ ᥑᥩᥢᥴ; Jingpho: Mangshi Myu), former name Luxi (潞西), is a county-level city and the seat of Dehong Dai and Jingpo Autonomous Prefecture in western Yunnan province, China. Mangshi has an area of 2,900.91 km^{2} (1,120.05 sq mi), with an urban area of 18.66 km^{2} (7.20 sq mi). Han Chinese, Dai people (Tai Nuea branch) and Jingpo people (Zaiwa branch) are the major ethnic groups. Luxi County was established in 1949, and became a county-level city in 1996.

== Etymology ==
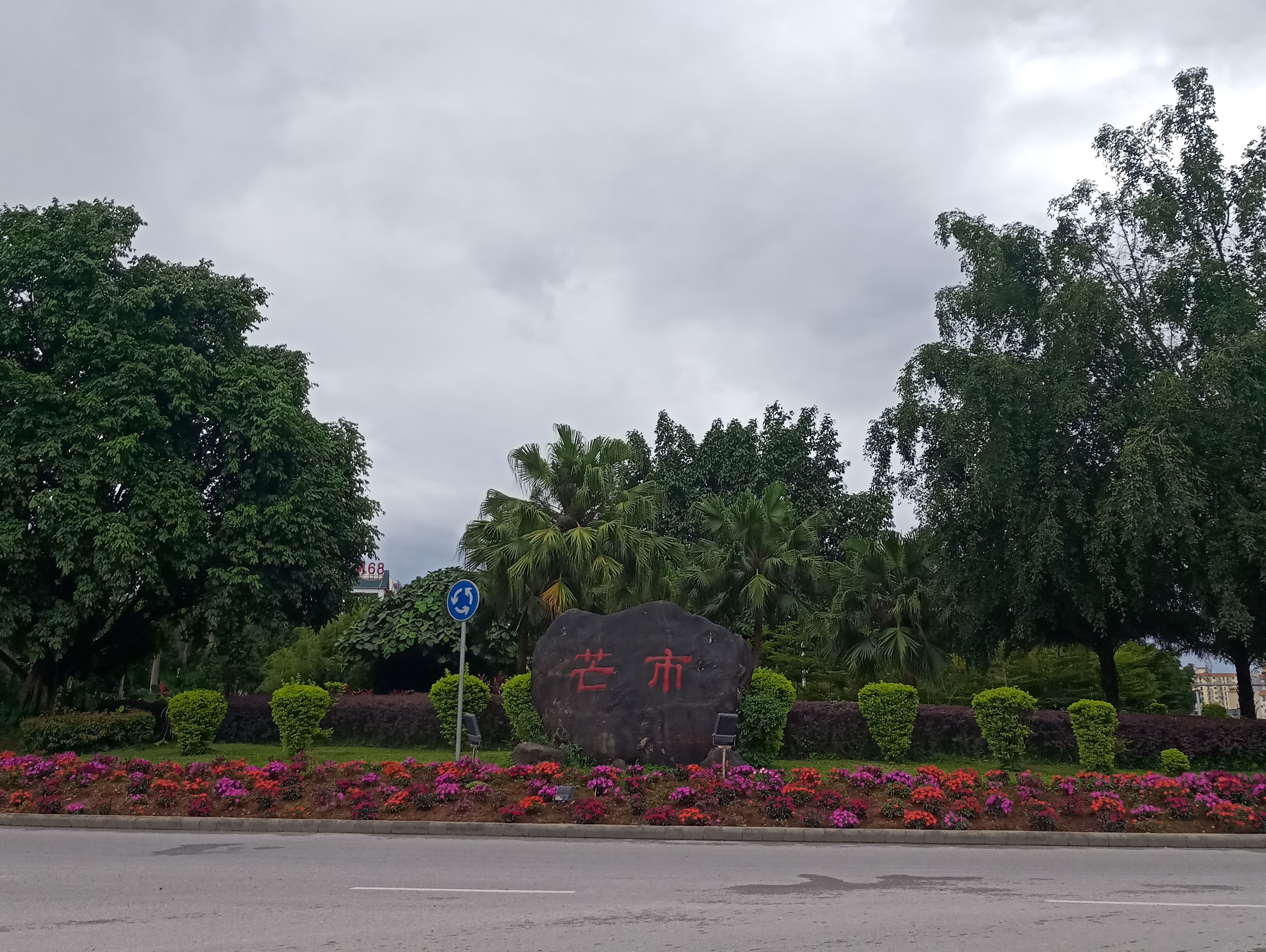
A stone with "芒市" script on the north entry roundabout of the city

Mangshi was originally called Luxi (潞西). The name "Luxi" originated in 1934 when the central government of Republic of China established the direct ruled government Luxi Administrative Bureau (潞西设治局). The name means "west of the Lu River," referring to "Lujiang" (潞江), another name for the Nujiang (Salween) River.

The name "Mangshi" evolved from the ancient tribal name Mangshi (茫施), which was used to refer to the ancestors of the De'ang people. The earliest known use of "Mangshi" as a place name appeared in 1443, in the tusi chiefdom title Mangshi Yuyi Zhangguansi (芒市御夷长官司).

Due to Mangshi's strategic importance as a stronghold in the China Burma India theater during World War II, and as the site where the Prime Ministers of China and Myanmar hosted the 1956 Sino-Burmese Border People Friendship Celebratory Conference, the name "Mangshi" became far more widely recognized than "Luxi". Additionally, major local landmarks were commonly named using "Mangshi" rather than "Luxi", such as Mangshi Hotel, Mangshi Airport, Mangshi Conference Hall, and Mangshi Square. As a result, many visiting merchants and travelers were familiar with "Mangshi" but not "Luxi". The limited recognition of the "Luxi" name hindered the city's development. In 2008, a public opinion survey in Luxi showed that among 4,751 respondents, 96.96% supported restoring the historical name "Mangshi". On 12 July 2010, the State Council of China approved the renaming of Luxi to Mangshi, and on 29 December of the same year, an official renaming ceremony was held at Mangshi Conference Hall.

Mangshi is the only county-level city in China with a two-character name where the second character (市, shì, meaning "city") serves both as a proper noun and as a political division suffix.

In the Tai Nuea language, Mangshi is called Muang Khon (ᥛᥫᥒᥰ ᥑᥩᥢᥴ, IPA: /məŋ^{55} xɔn^{35}/), written in Chinese as "勐焕", meaning "City of Dawn."

The standard English transliteration of the city's name is "Mangshi" based on Hanyu Pinyin. Sometimes, the Wade-Giles romanization "Mangshih" is also used.

== History ==
=== Prehistory–14th century ===
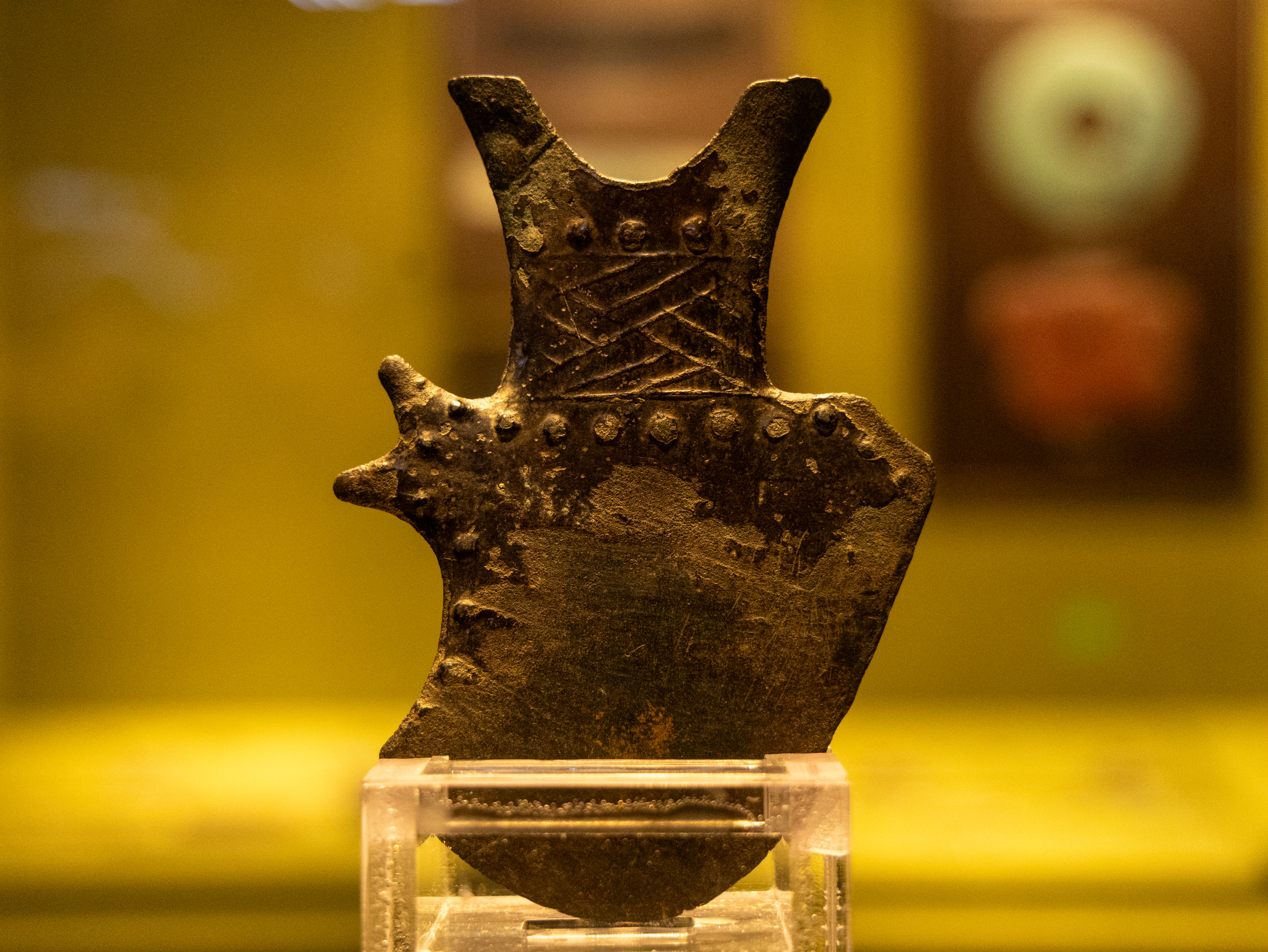
Eastern Han period Longjiang-type asymmetrical bronze axe collected in Dehong Prefectural Museum, which unearthed from Wuchalu Township, Mangshi

In the late Neolithic period, human activity had already emerged within the Mangshi region. Archaeological sites from this period have been discovered in villages such as Mangbing (芒丙) and Huangjiazhai (黄家寨) in Zhongshan Township, which modern research identifies as part of the prehistoric culture of the ancestors of the De'ang people.

During the Bronze Age, the Mangshi area successively fell under the domains of the Dian-Yue Chengxiang Kingdom (滇越乘象国) and the Ailao Kingdom. In 69 AD, Liu Mao (柳貌), the king of Ailao, led 77 tribal chieftains to pledge allegiance to the Han court. In response, the Han dynasty established Yongchang Commandery in the former Ailao territory, with Mangshi falling under the jurisdiction of Ailao County within the commandery. The Shu-Han regime maintained this administrative structure during the Three Kingdoms period. In 271 AD, it was reassigned to Ning Zhou. In the Tang dynasty, the Mangshi area was inhabited by the Mangman tribes, and the tribe name "Mangshi" (茫施) first appeared in historical records.

茫蛮部落，并是开南杂种也……又有大赕、茫昌、茫盛恐、茫鲊、茫施，皆其类也。
The Mangman tribe is also a mixed group of Kainan... Additionally, there are the Dadan, Mangchang, Mangshengkong, Mangzha, and Mangshi tribes, all of which belong to the same category.

— Fan Chuo, Manshu

In the early 7th century, Mangshi was known as "Xieluo City" (些罗城) and was under the jurisdiction of Yongchang Jiedu (Military Command, 永昌节度) during the Nanzhao period. In the Dali Kingdom, it was called "Numou" (怒谋) and belonged to Yongchang Prefecture (永昌府). After the Yuan dynasty conquered the Dali Kingdom, the Jinchi Pacification Commission was established in 1261, with Mangshi under its administration. In 1271, the Pacification Commission was divided into different Circuits, and Mangshi fell under the jurisdiction of the Eastern Circuit Appeasement Commission (东路安抚使), which renamed the Zhenkang Circuit Appeasement Commission (镇康路安抚使) in 1275. In 1276, it was separated from Zhenkang Circuit, and Mangshi Circuit (茫施路) was established under the Pacification Commission's jurisdiction, marking the formal beginning of Mangshi's administrative status.

At the same time the Yuan dynasty established Mangshi Circuit, it also set up Luchuan Circuit in what is now Ruili City, which the Dai/Shan people refer the regime as Möng Mao. During the First Yuan-Burma War, Luchuan Circuit served as an important frontline base for the Yuan army, and the Yuan dynasty exerted strong military control and political rule over Luchuan during the conflict. In 1302, after the Yuan dynasty abandoned its campaign against Myanmar, the military and administrative officials withdrew to the inland, and thereafter, Luchuan's influence began to expand on a large scale. The Mangshi region was actually under the administration of the local power in Luchuan, and by the end of the Yuan dynasty, it had effectively become independented from the central government. The battlefield of the Battle of Ngasaunggyan within First Yuan-Burma War may have been located along the banks of the Mangshi River in the Mangshi area.

=== 14th century–1911 ===
==== Ming dynasty ====
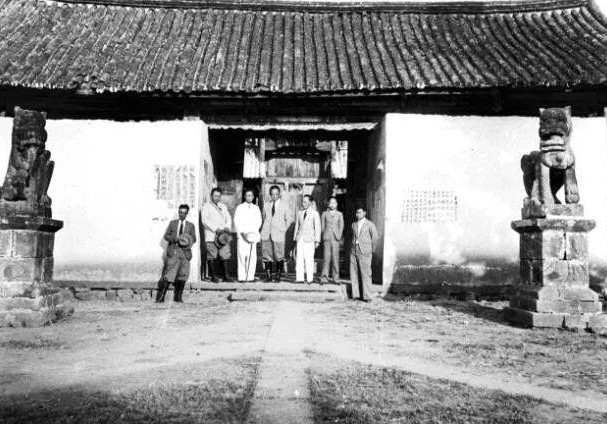
Headquarter of Mangshi Tusi Chiefdom, 1935

After the Ming dynasty entered Yunnan, the administrative system announced in 1382 included Mangshi Prefecture (芒施府). However, it did not recognize Luchuan's expansion or its control over Mangshi, instead classifying Luchuan as just one of many prefectures and circuits in western Yunnan. This decision led to dissatisfaction in Luchuan, which soon went to war with the Ming central court before eventually surrendering. In 1399, after the death of Si Lunfa, the Ming dynasty initiated split Luchuan's territory, dismantling Luchuan's control and establishing multiple Tusi regimes. Mangshi, located near Luchuan's core region, remained under Luchuan's control during this time. Under Si Renfa’s rule, Luchuan once again expanded outward, prompting the Ming court to launch a military campaign against it, known in history as the "Luchuan–Pingmian campaigns".

In 1443, Si Jifa attacked Fangge (放革), a former Luchuan chief who had aligned with the Ming dynasty and was the leader of Mangshi. Si Jifa was defeated by the Ming army, and in response, the Ming court established the Mangshi Yuyi Zhangguansi (lit. 'Pacifying Chief Administrator', 芒市御夷长官司), placing it under the jurisdiction of the Jinchi Military and Civilian Command Commission. Later, it was directly administered by the Yunnan Province.

Following the Ming–Burmese War, the Ming court split the original Longchuan Tusi Chiefdom territory and established the Zhefang Vice-Pacification Commission (遮放副宣抚司) in 1584, headquartered in present-day Zhefang. In 1640, the Mangshi Yuyi Zhangguansi (upper-6th level) was upgraded to the Mangshi Appeasement Commission (lower-5th level, 芒市安抚司).

==== Qing dynasty ====
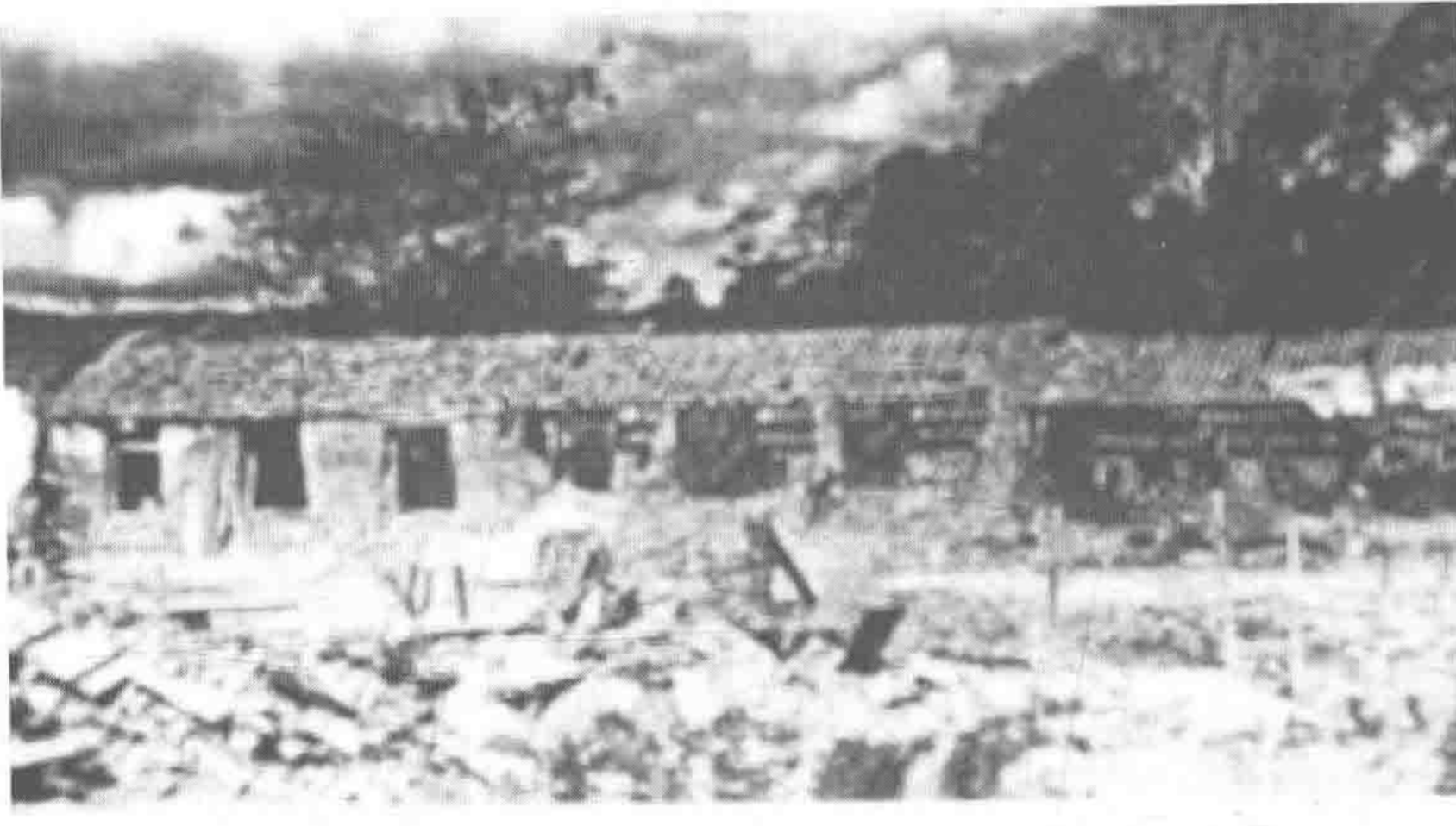
Headquarter of Zhefang Tusi Chiefdom destroyed by World War II

In 1656, the Yongli Emperor of the Southern Ming entered Yunnan and appealed to the Tusi chiefdoms to resist the Qing forces. Qing troops entered western Yunnan in 1658, and the Ganya Tusi of Yingjiang County led his forces to resist the Qing and assisted Emperor Yongli in fleeing to Burma, but his entire army was destroyed. In 1659, the Tusi chiefdoms of Dehong included Mangshi submitted to the Qing dynasty, the new court retained their original positions, and were placed under the jurisdiction of Yongchang Prefecture.

After Hsinbyushin succeeded as the king of the Konbaung dynasty, Burma, he launched several raids into Yunnan. The Qing–Burmese War broke out, and in 1764, the Viceroy of Yun-Gui set up military checkpoints at Santai Mountain (三台山) in Mangshi and at Mangkanqing (芒坎箐) in Zhefang, deploying troops for defense. In 1766, the Burmese army occupied Hsenwi State and Wanmaw State. The viceroy sent Wu-Er-Den (乌尔登) with 3,000 troops to Zhefang, while viceroy Mingrui personally led 10,000 troops to meet E'erdeng'e (额勒登额) in Hsenwi via Mangshi. By 1769, the conflict had ended, and Mangshi remained a key Qing military base, supplying over 30,000 Qing troops with a large amount of military provisions.

In 1770, Longling Subprefecture was established, and both Mangshi and Zhefang were transferred under its administration from Yongchang Prefecture. In 1899, the Sino-British boundary demarcation of the Yunnan-Myanmar border resulted in the return of the Mengban region, which had been annexed by Hsenwi during the early Qing period. Due to its strategic importance, the Mengban Thousand Commander was established to oversee the area.

=== 1911–1949 ===
In the Republic of China period, the Yunnan government appointed two "suppression commissars" (彈壓委員) to Mangban (芒板) and Zhemao (遮卯) within the Mangshi area in 1913. Mangban suppression commissar administered Mangshi Anfusi and Mengban Tuqianzong territories, and Zhemao suppression commissar administered Zhefang Xuanfusi and Mengmao Anfusi (勐卯安撫司, in Ruili) territories. The two suppression commissars were replaced by an administrative commissar (行政委員) in 1915, and a district named Mangzheban Administrative District (芒遮板行政區) was established. At the same time, Mengmao Anfusi was separated from the district, thus forming the boundaries of modern Mangshi. As a transition before formally establishing a county, Yunnan government set a Shezhiju (設治局, similar to a governing council) in Mangshi area named Mangzheban Shezhiju (芒遮板設治局) replacing Mangzheban District in 1929. The Administrative Bureau is a quasi-county level administrative division. Mengga is the seat of the bureau. It changed the name to Luxi Shezhiju (潞西設治局) in 1934. The Imperial Japanese Army occupied Luxi on 4 May 1942 and retreated on 11 December 1944 when Counterattack of Western Yunnan started. In 1949, Luxi Administrative Bureau finally became Luxi County (潞西县), with the seat of county government at the town of Mangshi, and the first county magistrate was the acting Tusi Fang Kesheng (方克胜). The Tusi system and the central bureaucracy still coexisted.

=== 1949–present ===
Fang Kesheng refused to join People's Republic of China, preferring to remain neutral. Eventually the People's Liberation Army advanced into Luxi in April 1950, and Fang Kesheng fled to Taiwan. His brother Fang Keguang succeeded be the acting tusi, and cooperated with the Chinese Communist Party. The three tusi were killed during the land reform movement in 1955. Luxi County became Luxi City (county-level city) in 1996, and changed the name to Mangshi City in 2010.

== Geography ==
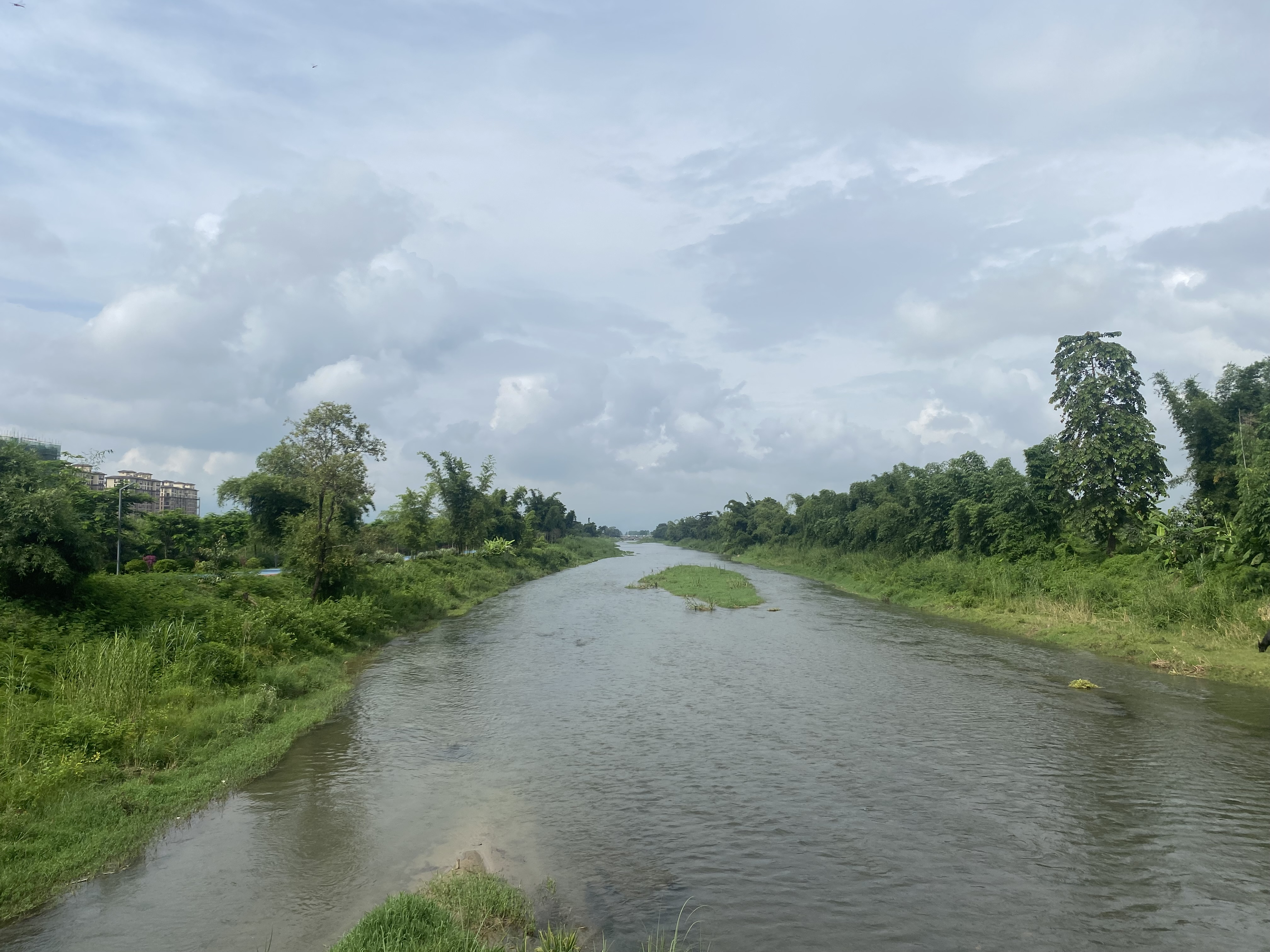
Mangshi River

Mangshi has an area of 2,900.91 km^{2} (1,120.05 sq mi). There are two main plains in Mangshi named Mangshi Ba (芒市坝) and Zhefang Ba (遮放坝). The city of Mangshi is situated at the east of Mangshi Ba. Mountains are the primary landforms of Mangshi, making up approximately 84.48% of the territory. Mount Qingkou (箐口山) is the city's highest point, with an altitude of 2,889.1 meters. Manxin River's (曼辛河) estuary (at Salween River) is the lowest point, with an altitude of 528 metres in Zhongshan Township. The mountains are branches of western Gaoligong Mountains.

Mangshi River is the "mother river" of Mangshi, and has a drainage basin of 1,881 km^{2} (726 sq mi), about 61.3% of area of Mangshi. Longchuan River (龙川江) is the border river between Mangshi and Lianghe County and Longchuan County on the north and west. Salween River on the southeast tip of Mangshi marks the international border between Mangshi and Myanmar's Shan State.

== Climate ==
Climate data for Mangshi, elevation 914 m (2,999 ft), (1991–2020 normals, extremes 1981–present)
Month	Jan	Feb	Mar	Apr	May	Jun	Jul	Aug	Sep	Oct	Nov	Dec	Year
Record high °C (°F)	27.0 (80.6)	31.0 (87.8)	33.4 (92.1)	35.2 (95.4)	36.9 (98.4)	35.0 (95.0)	36.0 (96.8)	36.1 (97.0)	35.7 (96.3)	33.4 (92.1)	30.7 (87.3)	27.4 (81.3)	36.9 (98.4)
Mean daily maximum °C (°F)	22.2 (72.0)	24.4 (75.9)	27.7 (81.9)	29.7 (85.5)	29.8 (85.6)	29.0 (84.2)	28.3 (82.9)	29.2 (84.6)	29.5 (85.1)	28.0 (82.4)	25.5 (77.9)	22.8 (73.0)	27.2 (80.9)
Daily mean °C (°F)	13.1 (55.6)	15.1 (59.2)	18.4 (65.1)	21.5 (70.7)	23.6 (74.5)	24.4 (75.9)	24.1 (75.4)	24.5 (76.1)	24.0 (75.2)	21.9 (71.4)	17.8 (64.0)	14.2 (57.6)	20.2 (68.4)
Mean daily minimum °C (°F)	6.9 (44.4)	8.3 (46.9)	11.4 (52.5)	15.2 (59.4)	19.2 (66.6)	21.6 (70.9)	21.8 (71.2)	21.8 (71.2)	20.9 (69.6)	18.3 (64.9)	13.0 (55.4)	8.9 (48.0)	15.6 (60.1)
Record low °C (°F)	−0.2 (31.6)	1.5 (34.7)	3.6 (38.5)	7.5 (45.5)	13.2 (55.8)	16.3 (61.3)	15.9 (60.6)	17.6 (63.7)	14.5 (58.1)	9.3 (48.7)	5.5 (41.9)	1.0 (33.8)	−0.2 (31.6)
Average precipitation mm (inches)	19.9 (0.78)	19.6 (0.77)	26.5 (1.04)	65.4 (2.57)	147.2 (5.80)	267.2 (10.52)	371.9 (14.64)	339.0 (13.35)	170.3 (6.70)	131.6 (5.18)	38.3 (1.51)	9.7 (0.38)	1,606.6 (63.24)
Average precipitation days (≥ 0.1 mm)	3.2	4.0	5.8	10.6	16.2	23.3	27.8	25.1	19.0	13.4	5.5	2.6	156.5
Average relative humidity (%)	76	70	64	66	73	83	87	85	83	81	79	79	77
Mean monthly sunshine hours	227.9	217.8	228.8	211.8	190.3	111.8	79.4	111.9	140.1	169.3	209.9	220.1	2,119.1
Percentage possible sunshine	68	68	61	55	46	27	19	28	38	48	64	67	49
Source: China Meteorological Administrationall-time November high

== Administrative divisions ==
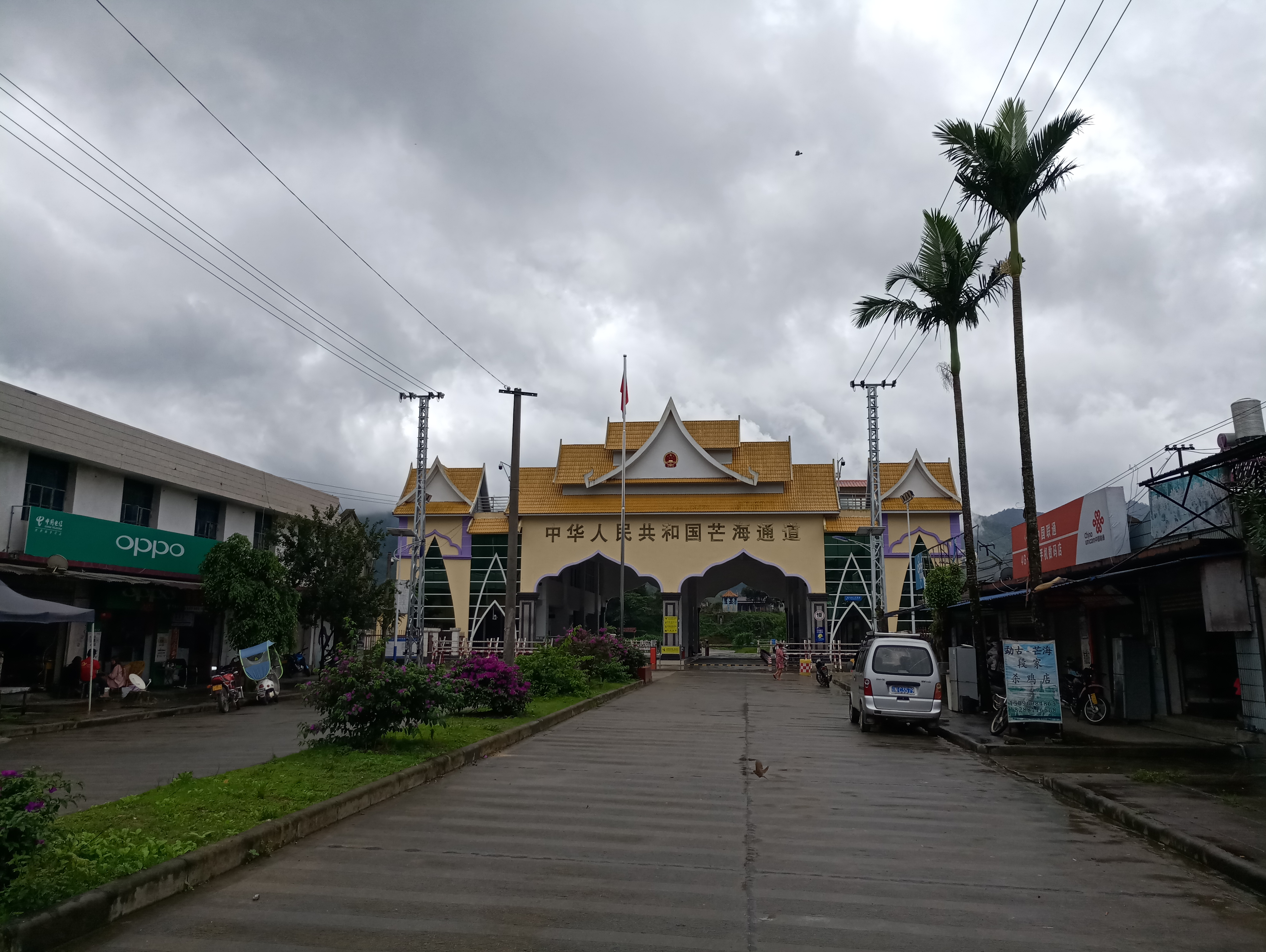
Manghai Border Passway at Manghai Town

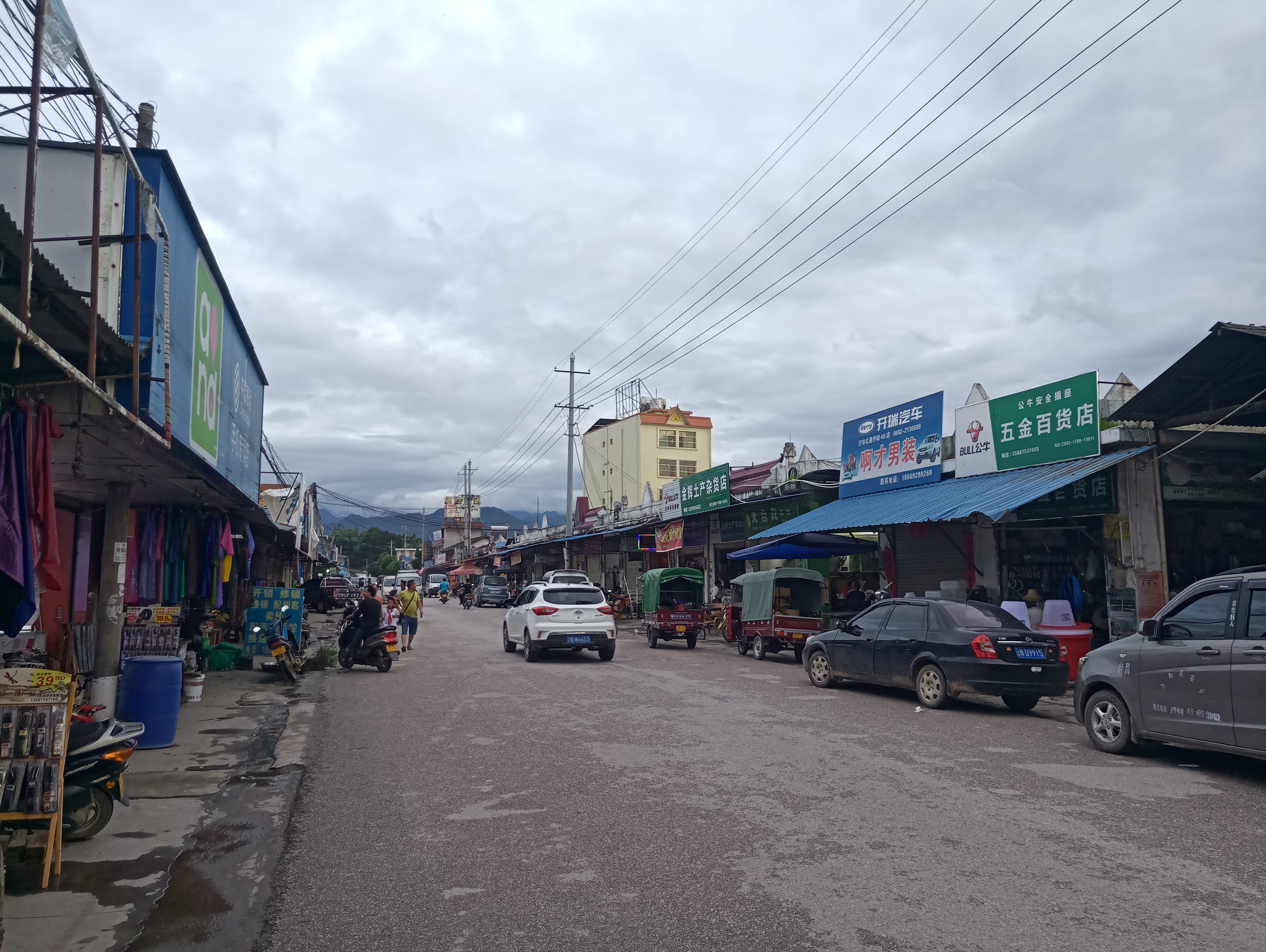
Street in Fengping Town

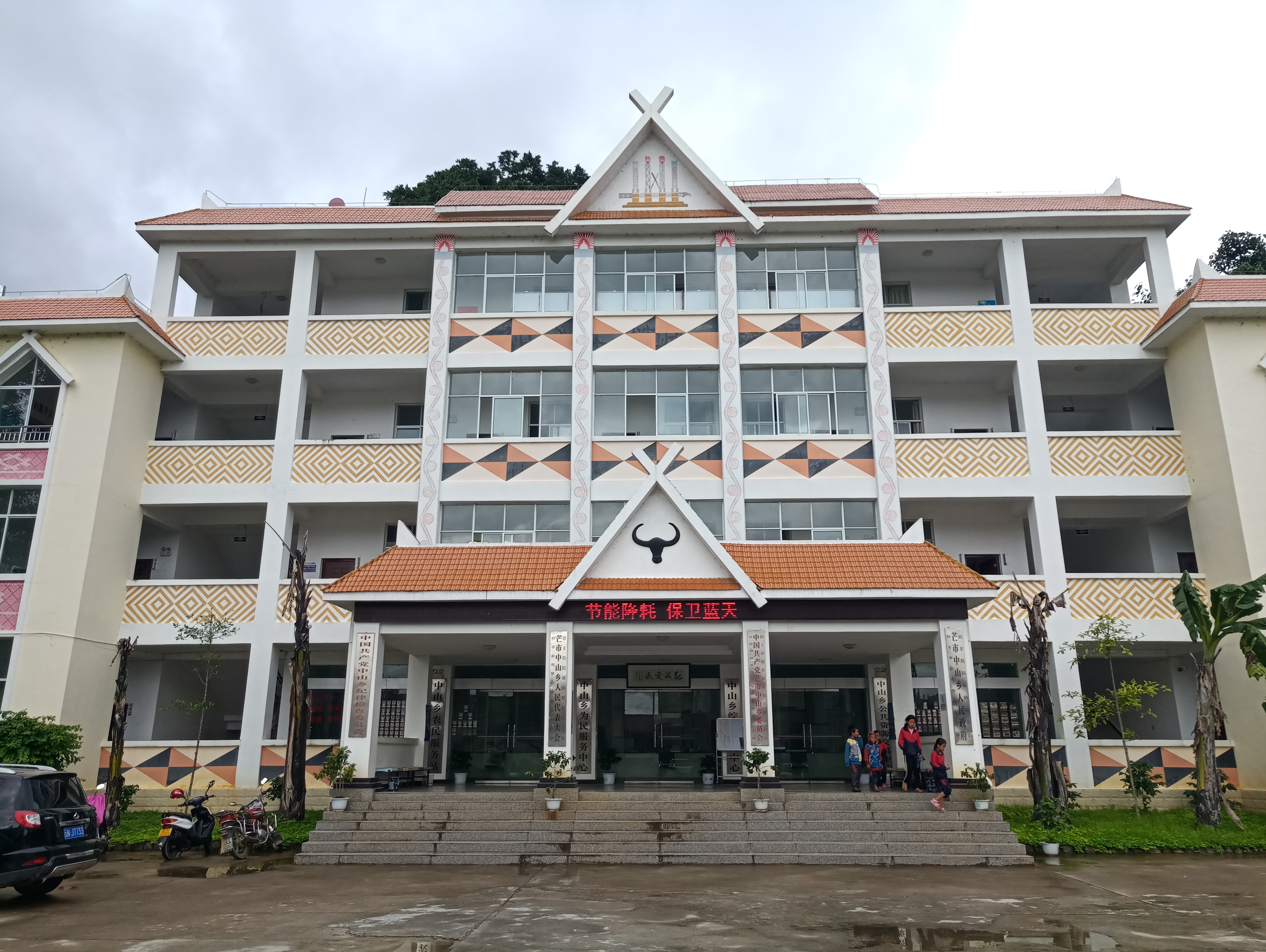
Zhongshan Township government

Mangshi currently comprises 12 administrative township-level subdivisions including one subdistrict, five towns and six townships.

Name	Name in Chinese	Code	Founded	Area (km^{2})	Population 2010 Census	Density
Menghuan Subdistrict	勐焕街道	533103001	2008	23.15	99,970	4318.36
Mangshi Town	芒市镇	533103101	1936	349.5	46,353	132.63
Zhefang Town	遮放镇	533103102	1936	422	51,477	121.98
Mengga Town	勐戛镇	533103103	1936	389	24,344	62.58
Manghai Town	芒海镇	533103104	1988	105	5,641	53.72
Fengping Town	风平镇	533103105	1998	381	69,586	182.64
Xuangang Township	轩岗乡	533103201	1936	163.7	21,501	131.34
Jiangdong Township	江东乡	533103202	1988	220.8	25,240	114.31
Xishan Township	西山乡	533103203	1988	257	12,296	47.84
Zhongshan Township	中山乡	533103204	1988	278	10,170	36.58
Santaishan Palaung Ethnic Township	三台山德昂族乡	533103205	1988	158	7,068	44.73
Wuchalu Township	五岔路乡	533103206	1988	202	16,245	80.42

== Economy ==
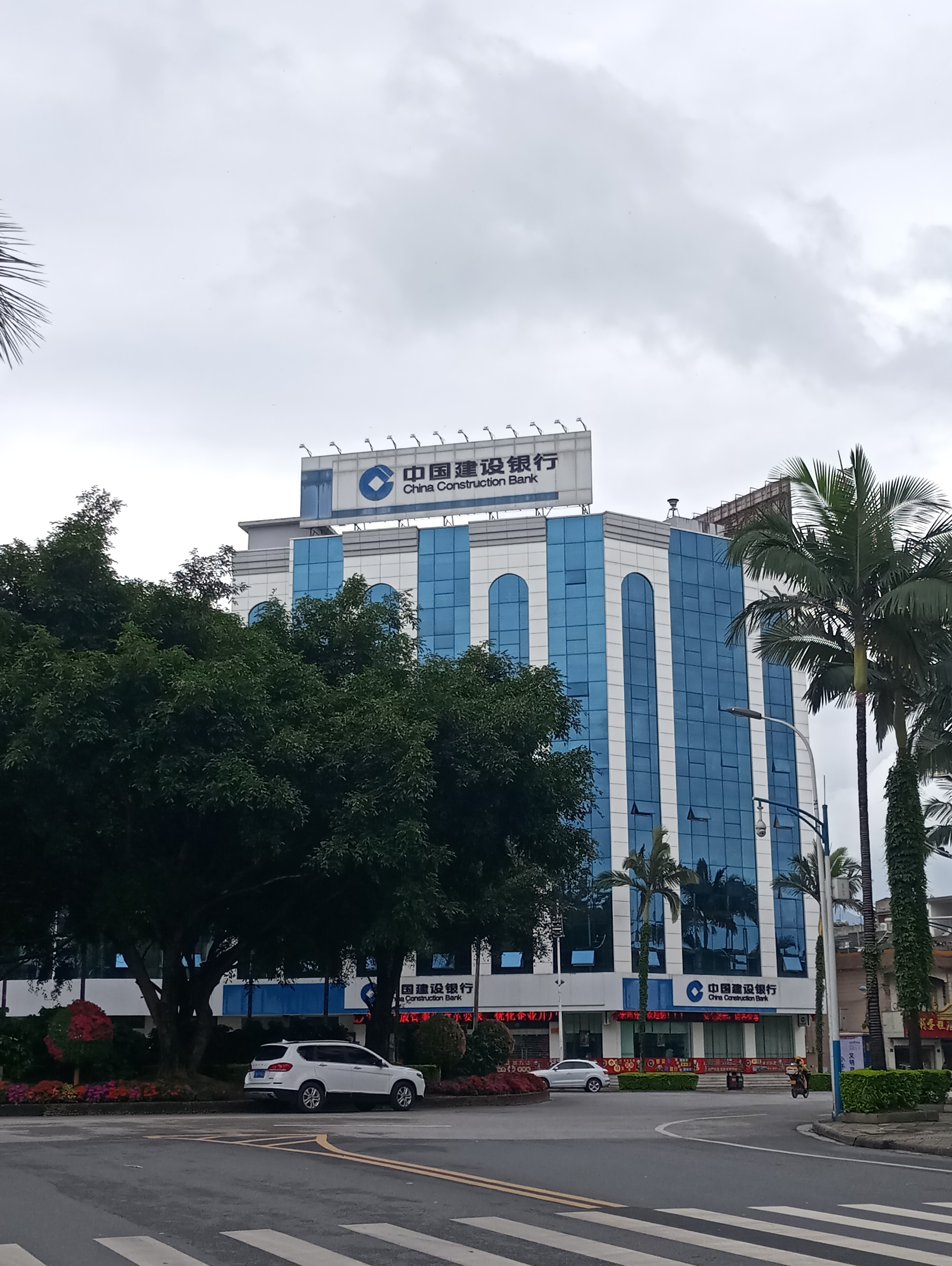
China Construction Bank Dehong branch company in north of city

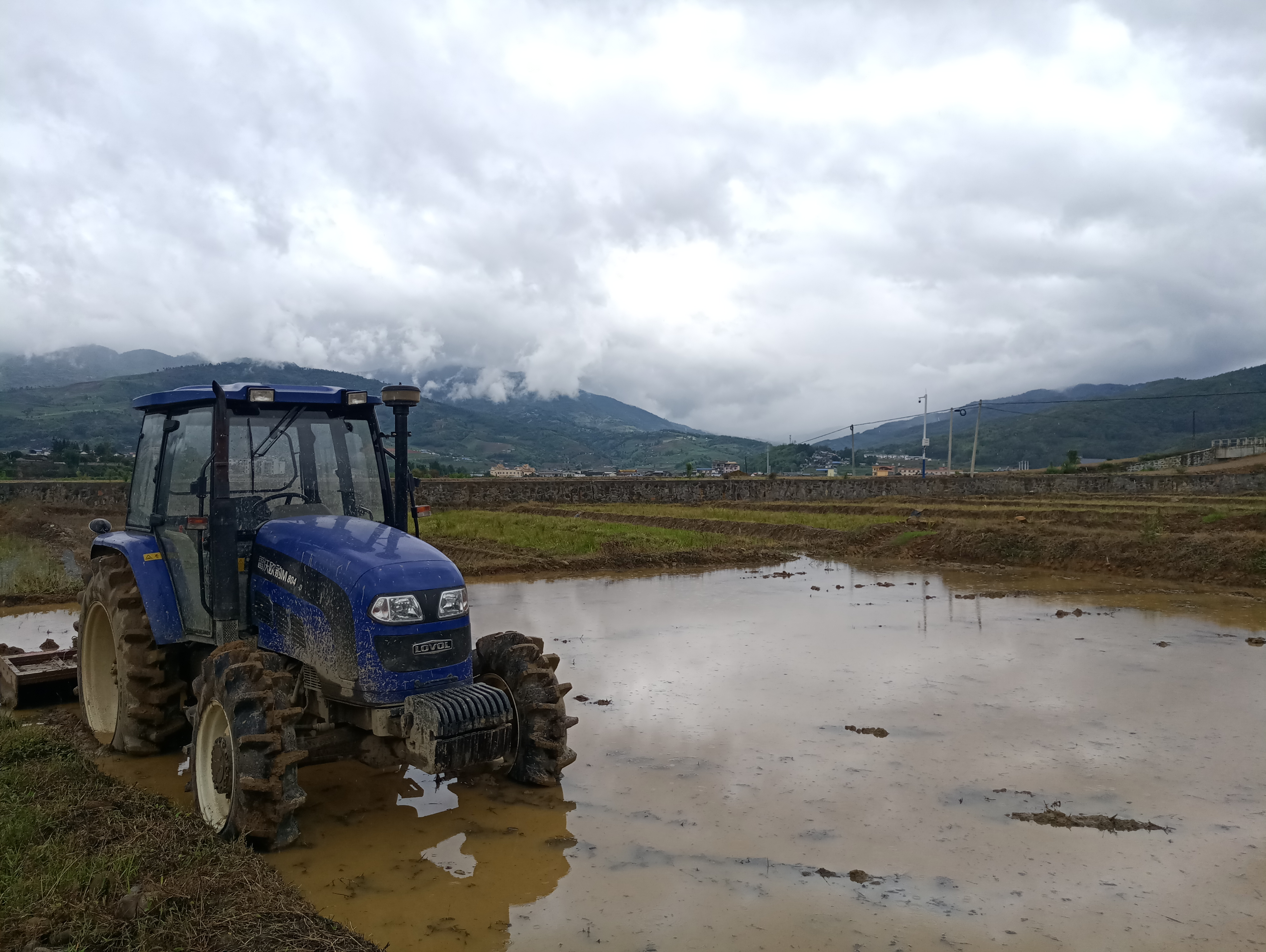
Paddy field close town of Manghai

As of 2016, Mangshi's nominal GDP was CN¥ 9.628 billion, about 0.65% of the province's GDP, ranking 44th among county-level administrative units in Yunnan; its nominal GDP per capita was CN¥ 23,307, 66th in the province, lower than Yunnan average (CN¥ 30,949).

In 1958, Yunnan government regulated trade in border areas, and the town of Mangshi was excluded from the zone of border trade. In 1980, province government opened Manghai (芒海), Mangbing (芒丙) and Xiaogai (小街) as border trade markets. After Hu Yaobang, the General Secretary of the Chinese Communist Party inspected Dehong prefecture in 1985, Mangshi abolished all border checkpoints, and made the whole territory a border trade zone. The border trade and other tertiary sectors was prosperous in the 1990s. The proportion of three industrial sectors in 1978 was 65.6 : 16.3 : 18.1, and in 2016, 23.2 : 20.5 : 56.3.

Asian rice, sugarcane, tea, coffee, macadamia nut and fruits (banana, pineapple, mango, jackfruit etc.) are the main agricultural products of Mangshi, especially coffee. Mangshi has 19,056 ha. of paddy field, 9,165 ha. of sugarcane field, 7,504 ha. of macadamia forest, 5,870 ha. of coffee field and 5,469 ha. of fruit field in 2018. Asian Coffee Association was established at Mangshi in 2017. 13 countries are members of the association. Hogood Coffee is the largest domestic instant coffee producer in China, and the 10th largest civilian-run enterprise of Yunnan.

== Population ==
Historical population
Year	Pop.	±% p.a.
1919	49,105	—
1932	39,618	−1.64%
1947	50,832	+1.68%
1953	109,718	+13.68%
1964	152,763	+3.05%
1982	244,411	+2.65%
1990	292,183	+2.26%
2000	337,406	+1.45%
2010	389,891	+1.46%
Source: Annals of Luxi County etc.

In 2016, Mangshi had a total population of 415,700 over the whole county-level city, of which 171.2 thousand resided in the city core, the subdistrict of Menghuan.

According to the 2010 census, Mangshi has 204,083 Han citizens, 52.34% of total population. Other main ethnicities are Dai and Jingpo, which has a population with 132,421 and 29,208. Mangshi has the largest number of Palaung people in any county-level subdivision of China, with a population of 9,986, which mainly live in Santaishan Palaung Ethnic Township. (Note: Other major area of Palaung people in China: Zhenkang County (2,374), Ruili City (1,783), Longchuan County (1,454), Gengma County (1,158), Longyang District (1,075))

Historically, Dai people lived in the plains. Jingpo people immigrated to the mountains from the Tibetan Plateau in the 16th century. Han Chinese became the majority because of the Ming conquest of Yunnan and several Sino-Burmese wars, and the subsequent stationing of Chinese army in the area.

== Culture ==
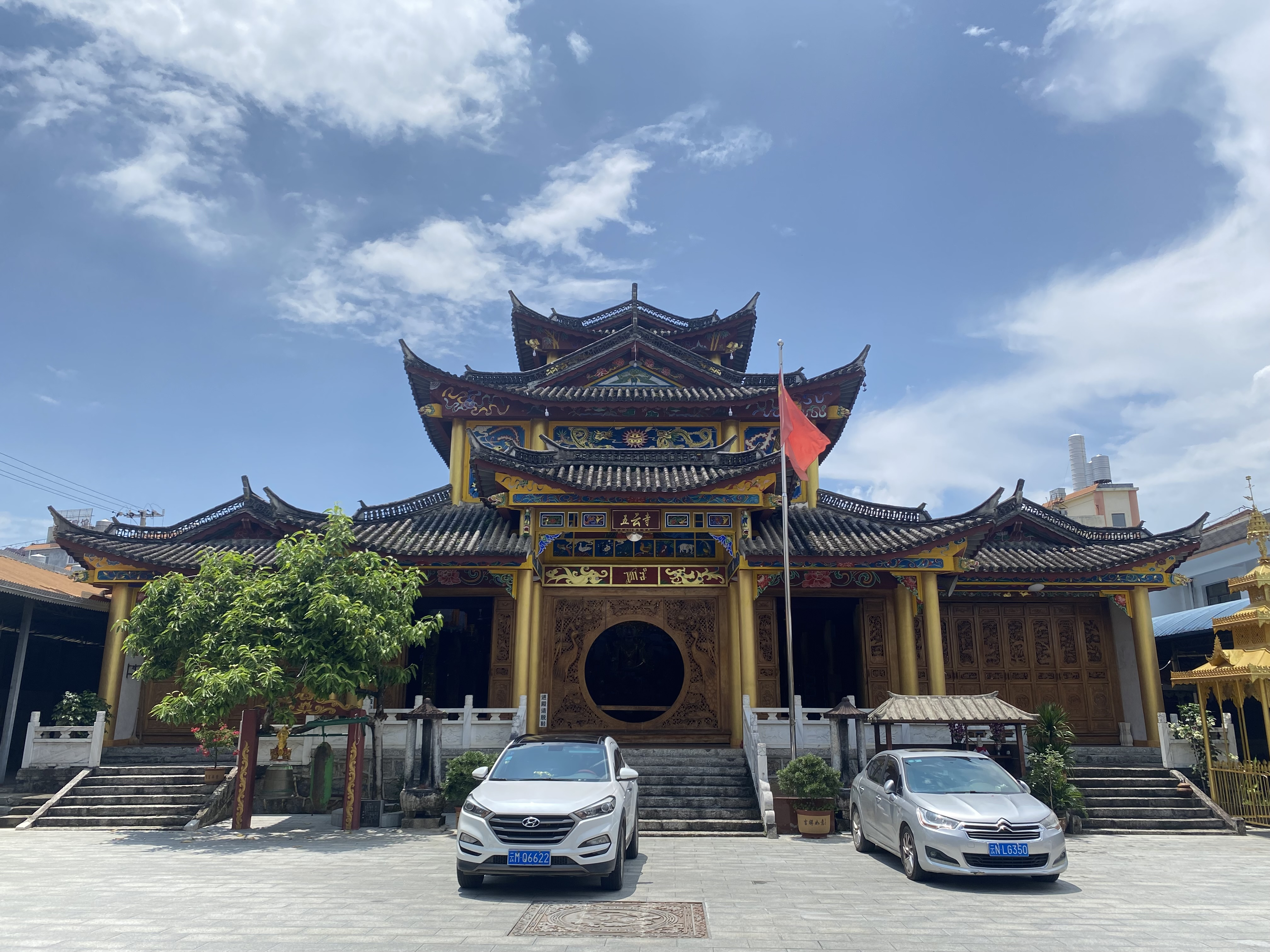
Wuyun Temple (五云寺) is the first temple of Mangshi which built in 1665.

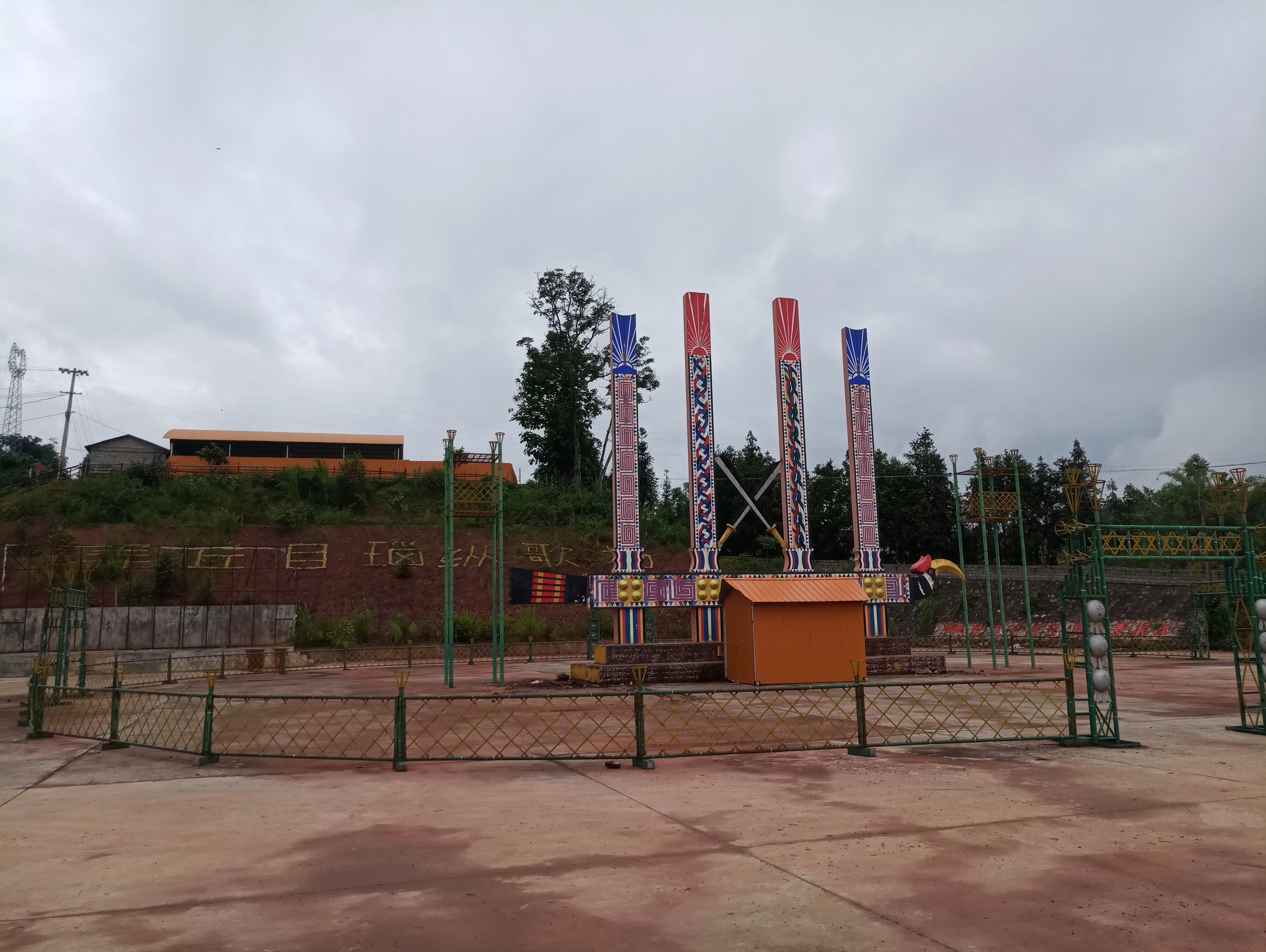
A Manau place in Nongqiu Village (弄丘村), Zhefang.

Dai people in Mangshi speak Tai Nuea language, while Jingpo people speak Zaiwa and Jingpho. Zaiwa is the most populous branch of Jingpo in Mangshi.

Almost all the Dai and Palaung people follows Theravada Buddhism. Many villages have their own Buddhist temple, called "Zhuangfang" (奘房) or "Miansi" (缅寺; 'Burmese temple'). They are the center for religion activities and education, and also the entertainment venues for villagers. Expenditure of the temple and the monk life costs are paid by the villagers. An average Dai farmer spends one-fifth of his annual income for religion-related activities in 1988. In Jingpo folk religion, various gods as well as ancestral spirits are worshipped.

Water-Sprinkling Festival (in Thailand called "Songkran") and Manau are the grandest festivals of the Dai and Jingpo. They are both statutory holidays in Dehong Prefecture. The 15,000-capacity Dehong Stadium, a football stadium, is also used for cultural events.

== Transport ==
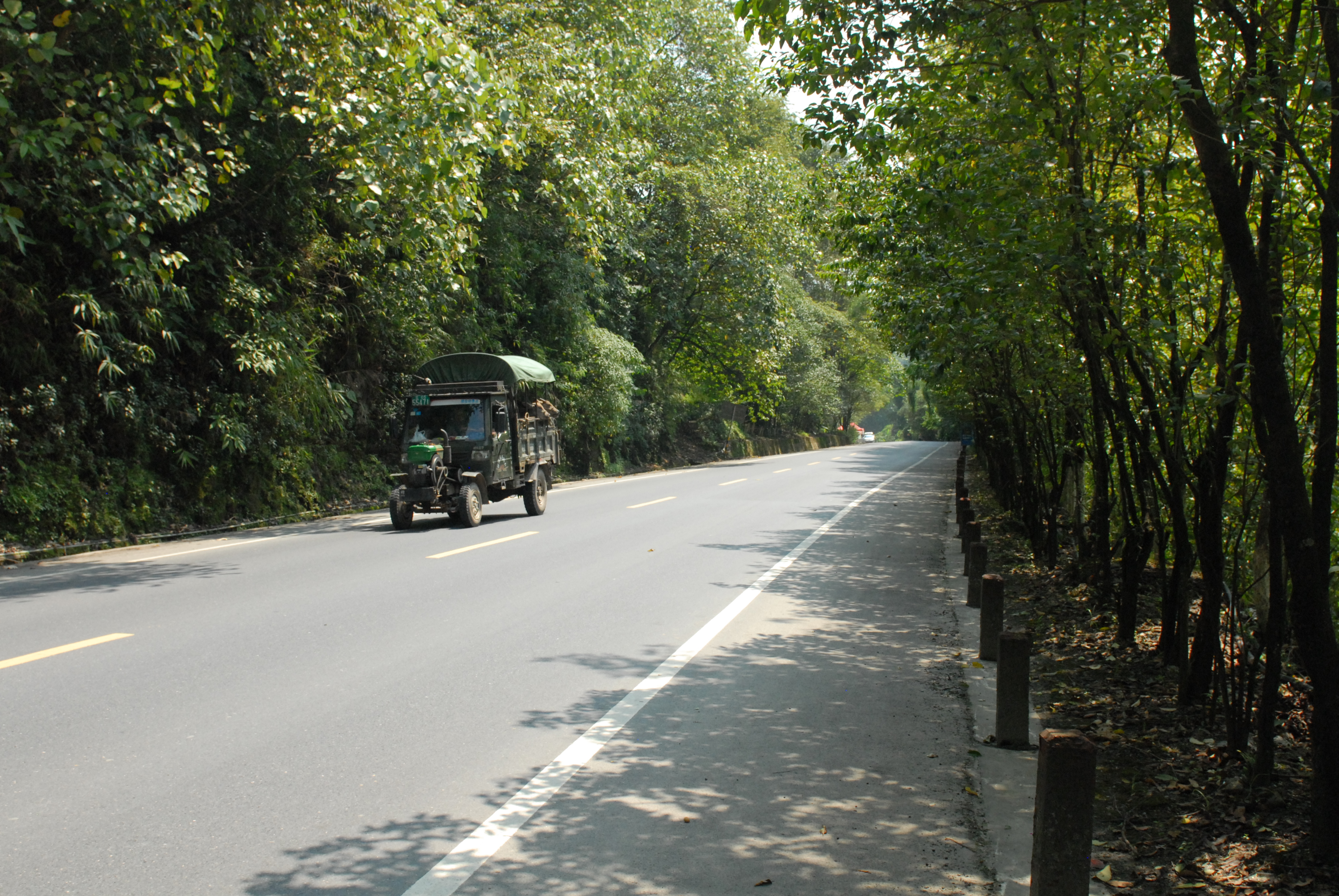
G320 Highway in Mangshi

Tusi Fang Keming (方克明) of Mangshi and Duo Jianxun (多建勋) of Zhefang built a road linking Mangshi and Wanding in 1926. An Indian engineer was invited to design the route. The road was completed in 1931, and became a part of the Burma Road in 1937. In modern China National Highways network, this road is part of G320 Highway. Longling-Ruili Expressway opened on 31 December 2015, and is the first expressway of Mangshi. It forms part of G56 Hangzhou–Ruili Expressway and AH14. A provincial highway, Mangshi-Lianghe Expressway is currently under construction. Another provincial expressway, Ruili-Menglian Expressway, is planned.

Although Mangshi has a 68.23 km-long borderline with Myanmar, it has no national port of entry. There are three border crossing without customs control into Myanmar serving the locals. They are Manghai (芒海), Zhongshan (中山) and Bangda (邦达). Manghai links Mong Ko in Myanmar, also known as Monekoe.

Dali–Ruili railway is under construction, with two stations in Mangshi: Mangshi and Mangshi West.

Dehong Mangshi International Airport is the only airport in Dehong Prefecture. It saw 1,652,533 passengers and 13,982 flights in 2017.

== Society ==
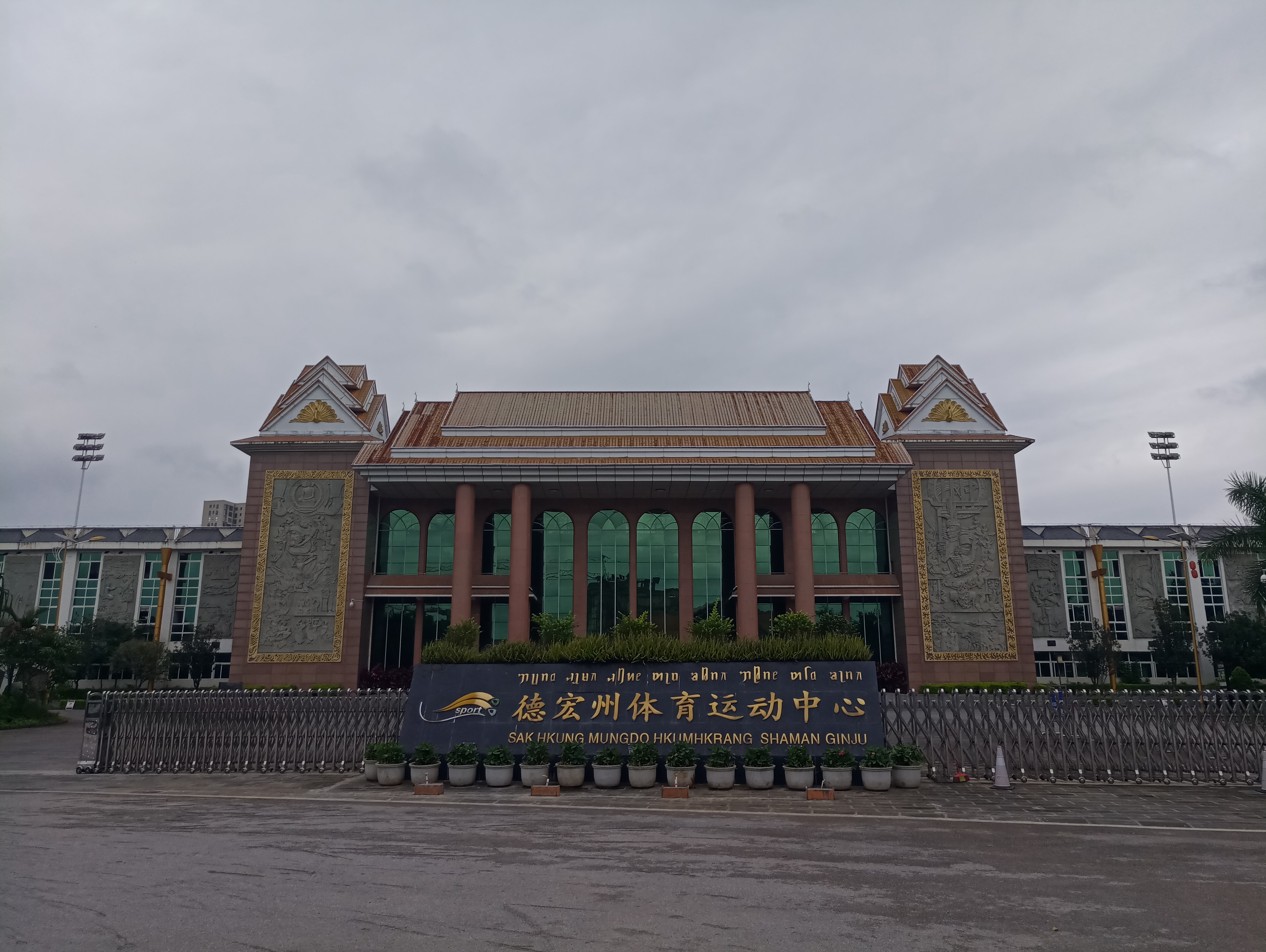
Dehong Sports Center

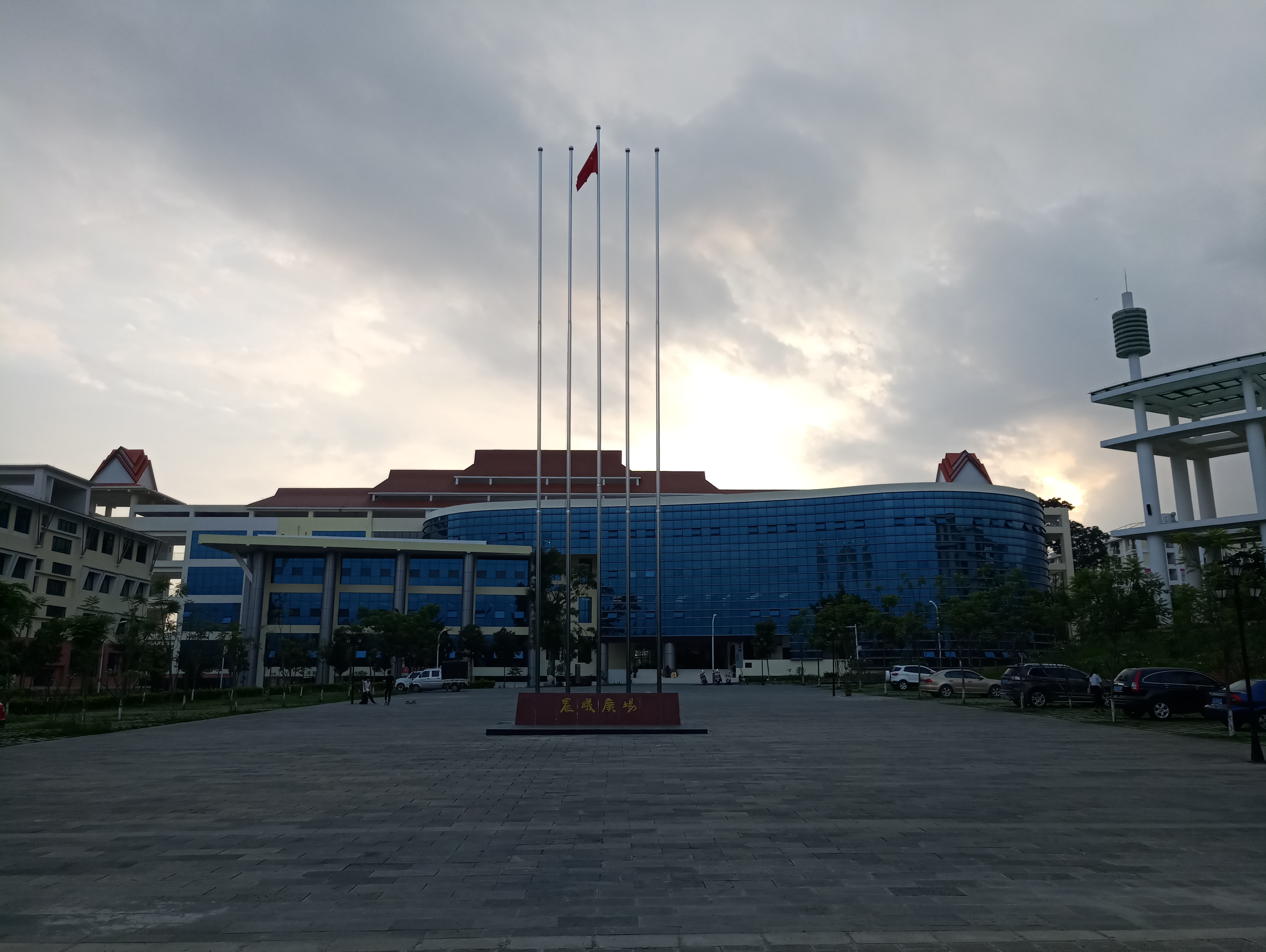
Square and the library of Dehong Teachers' College

Dehong Sports Center is located on the west of Mangshi, with a 21,000-capacity stadium, a 3,200-capacity basketball gym, a 2,150-capacity aquatics center, a 6-courts tennis gym and other outdoor sports fields. The sports center was built in 2008, and has a building area of 36,813.49m^{2}.

Dehong People's Hospital is a Tertiary B-level hospital established in 1954 in southeast of Mangshi. It has 1,200 beds and the service area covered up Dehong, Longling, Tengchong and part of Myanmar.

Dehong Teachers' College (德宏师范高等专科学校) is the main higher education college of Dehong, established in 2006. It is a technical college but under the working for upgrade to an undergraduate education university. Many Burmese students are studying abroad in the college.

Dehong's media is multilingual, reflecting its diverse ethnic makeup. Dehong TV Station was established in 1991, with programs in Chinese, Tai Nuea, Jingpho and Zaiwa. Dehong TV Station is the only TV station that uses four languages in China. Dehong Unity News (德宏团结报) is the official newspaper of Dehong Prefecture Committee of the Chinese Communist Party. The newspaper using five languages: Chinese, Tai Nuea, Jingpho, Zaiwa and Lisu. It is the only newspaper that uses five languages in China. Pauk-Phaw, the first Burmese newspaper of China, was founded in Mangshi in 2015 and is published by Dehong Unity Newspaper office. It serves the 50,000 Burmese who live in China.

== Tourism ==
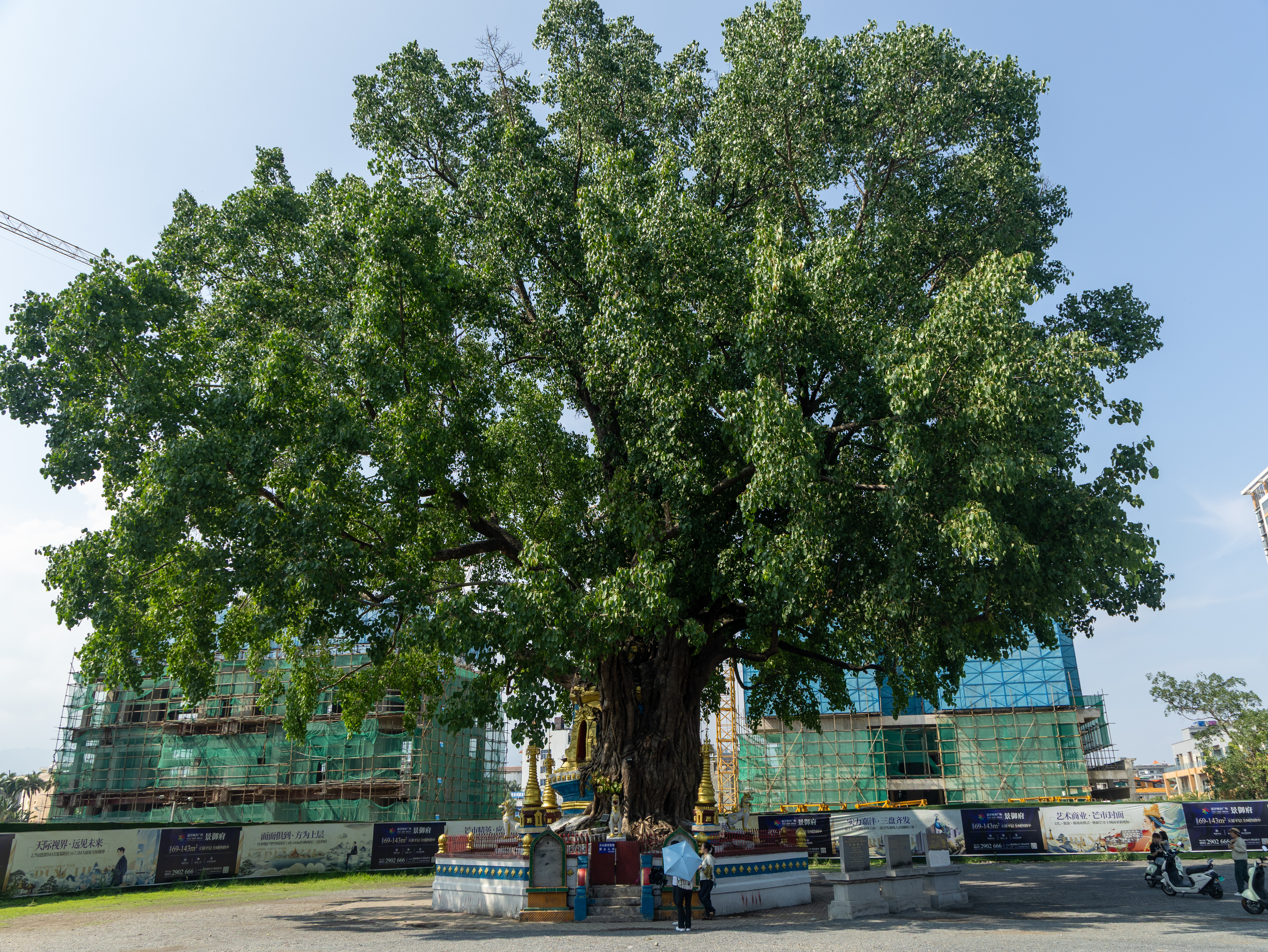
Tiecheng Stupa

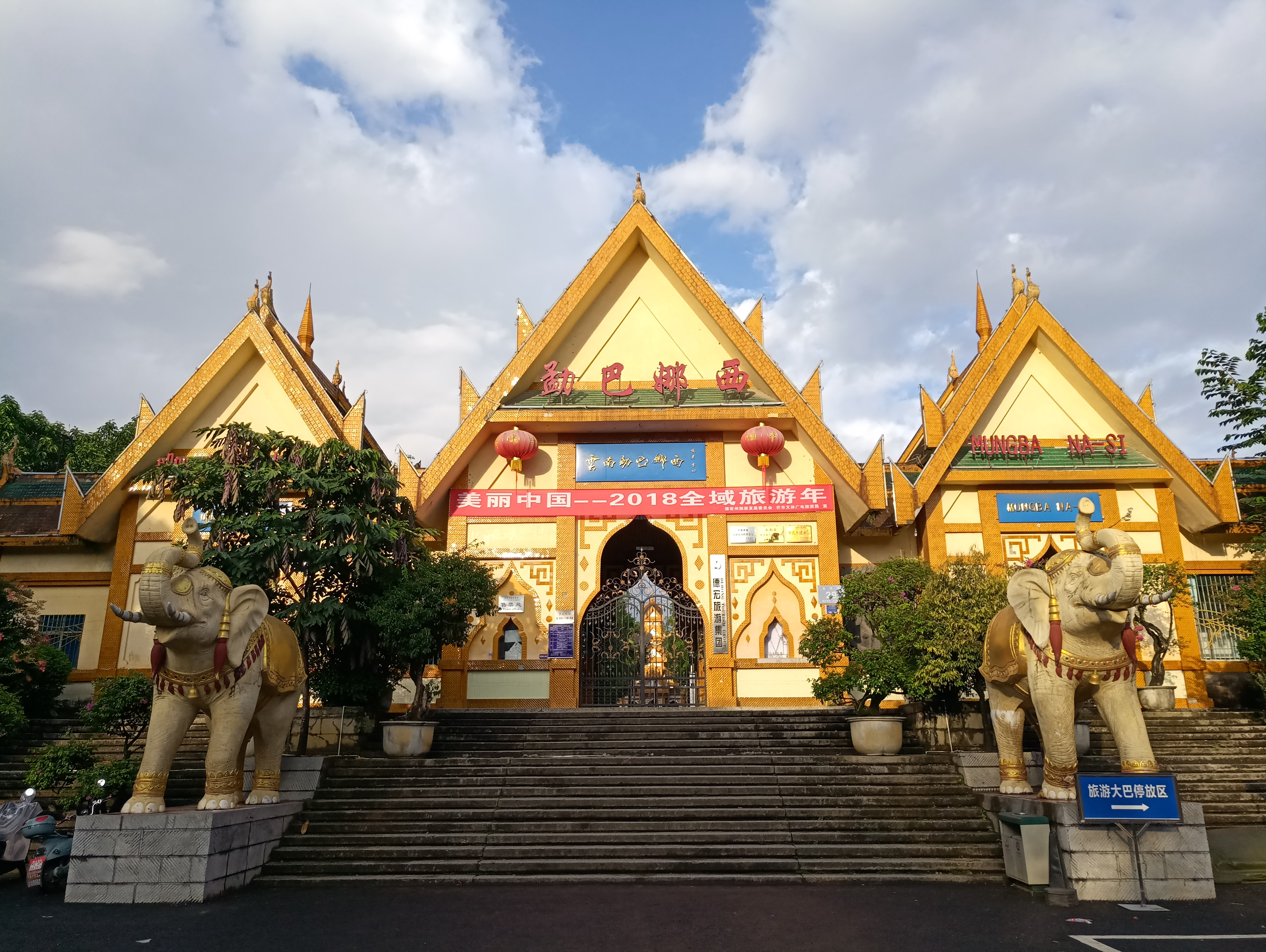
Mengbanaxi Exotics Garden

3.3 million tourists visited Mangshi in 2015, and generated a tourism income of CN¥ 5.09 billion for the city. Puti Temple, Wuyun Temple and Foguang Temple are well known Buddhist temples in Mangshi. Tiecheng Stupa, Fengping Stupa and Menghuan Pagoda are well known Buddhist pagodas. Tiecheng Pagoda, also known as "Shubao Pagoda" (Chinese: 树包塔; lit. 'pagoda wrapped by tree'), was built in Qianlong era, Qing dynasty. A seed fell in the crack of the pagoda about 200 years ago, and now, the pagoda is wrapped by the bodhi tree. Mengbanaxi Exotics Garden, a garden for valuable ancient trees and tree fossils, is the only AAAA state-level tourist destination of Mangshi.

== Friendly cities ==
Mangshi currently maintains friendship agreements with the following foreign

- Gangneung, Gangwon-do, South Korea

== See also ==
- List of administrative divisions of Yunnan

== Bibliography ==
- Syatauw, J. J. G (1961). Some Newly Established Asian States and the Development of International Law. New York: William S. Hein & Co., Inc. ISBN 978-90-247-0519-1.
- You (尤), Zhong (中) (1990). 云南地方沿革史 [A History of Administrative Changes in Yunnan] (in Chinese). Kunming: Yunnan People's Publishing House. ISBN 7-222-00606-0.
- Luxi Annals Compilation Committee, ed. (1993). 潞西县志 [Annals of Luxi County] (in Chinese). Kunming: Yunnan Education Publishing House. ISBN 7-5415-0685-0.
- Dehong Annals Compilation Committee, ed. (1994). 德宏州志·综合卷 [Annals of Dehong Prefecture, General Volume] (in Chinese). Mangshi: Dehong Nationalities Publishing House. ISBN 7-80525-248-3.
- Liu (刘), Xiangxue (祥学) (1997). "试论明英宗时期的三征麓川之役" [An Examination of the Three Campaigns Against Luchuan During the Reign of Emperor Yingzong of the Ming Dynasty]. 广西师范大学学报(哲学社会科学版) [JOURNAL OF GUANGXI NORMAL UNIVERSITY(PHILOSOPHY AND SOCIAL SCIENCE EDITION)] (in Chinese) (4): 86–89. doi:10.16088/j.issn.1001-6597.1997.04.016.
- Committee for the Study of Historical and Literary Materials of CPPCC Dehong Branch, ed. (1997). 德宏州文史资料选辑 第十辑 德宏土司专辑 [Selected Compilation of Historical and Literary Materials of Dehong Prefecture, Volume 10: Special Issue on Dehong Tusi] (in Chinese). Mangshi: Dehong Nationalities Publishing House. ISBN 7-80525-340-4.
- Fang (方), Guoyu (国瑜), ed. (1998). 云南史料丛刊 第二卷 [Collected Historical Documents of Yunnan, Volume 2] (in Chinese). Kunming: Yunnan University Press. ISBN 7-81025-828-1.
- Geng (耿), Deming (德铭) (2003). 哀牢国与哀牢文化 [Ailao Kingdom and Ailao Culture] (in Chinese). Kunming: Yunnan People's Publishing House. ISBN 7-222-03861-2.
- Bi (毕), Aonan (奥南) (2005). "洪武年间明朝与麓川王国关系考察" [A Review on the Relationship between Ming Dynasty and Luchuan Kingdom in the Hongwu Period]. 中国边疆史地研究 [China's Borderland History and Geography Studies] (in Chinese) (2): 102–111+148–149.
- Guo (郭), Hong (红); Jin (靳), Runcheng (润成) (2007). 中国行政区划通史·明代卷 [General History of Chinese Administrative Divisions: Ming Dynasty Volume] (in Chinese). Shanghai: Fudan University Press. ISBN 978-7-309-05602-0.
- Li (李), Zhengting (正亭) (2008). ""析麓川地"与明代西南边疆变迁关系析评" [An Analysis of the "Split of Luchuan Territory" and Its Relationship with the Changes in the Southwest Frontier of the Ming Dynasty]. 思想战线 [Thinking] (in Chinese) (1): 125–126.
- Lu (陆), Ren (韧) (2008). "元代西南边疆与麓川势力兴起的地缘政治" [The Yuan Dynasty's Southwest Frontier and The Geopolitics of the Rise of Luchuan Power]. 中国边疆史地研究 [China's Borderland History and Geography Studies] (in Chinese). 18 (3): 55–65.
- Santasombat, Yos (2008). Lak Chang: A reconstruction of Tai identity in Daikong. Canberra: ANU Press. ISBN 9781740760812.
- Li (李), Zhi'an (治安); Xue (薛), Lei (磊) (2009). 中国行政区划通史·元代卷 [General History of Chinese Administrative Divisions: Yuan Dynasty Volume] (in Chinese). Shanghai: Fudan University Press. ISBN 978-7-309-05601-3.
- Dehong Annals Compilation Committee, ed. (2011). 德宏年鉴2011 [Dehong Yearbook 2011] (in Chinese). Mangshi: Dehong Nationalities Publishing House. ISBN 978-7-80750-547-1.
- Fu (傅), Linxiang (林祥); Lin (林), Juan (涓); Ren (任), Yuxue (玉雪); Wang (王), Weidong (卫东) (2013). 中国行政区划通史·清代卷 [General History of Chinese Administrative Divisions: Qing Dynasty Volume] (in Chinese). Shanghai: Fudan University Press. ISBN 978-7-309-05603-7.
- Gao (高), Jinhe (金和) (2014). "麓川思氏王国的历史兴衰" [The Rise and Fall of Luchuan Kingdom during the Sis' Reign]. 临沧师范高等专科学校学报 [Journal of Lincang Education College] (in Chinese) (3): 19–23+35.
- Li (李), Chunxin (淳信) (2015). "德宏与保山德昂族史前文化遗址" [Prehistoric Cultural Sites of the De'ang People in Dehong and Baoshan]. 德宏师范高等专科学校学报 [Journal of Dehong Teachers College] (in Chinese) (3): 24–25.
- Lin (林), Wenxun (文勋); Yang (杨), Hong (红), eds. (2015). 滇西边境县研究书系 芒市 [Research Series on Border Counties in Western Yunnan: Mangshi] (in Chinese). Kunming: Yunnan University Press. ISBN 978-7-5482-2412-9.
- Niu (牛), Ruchen (汝辰) (2016). 中国地名掌故词典 [Etymological Dictionary of Chinese Place Names] (in Chinese). Beijing: China Society Press. ISBN 978-7-5087-5238-9.
- Ge (革), Anfa (安发), ed. (2018). 史话芒市（第一辑·2017） [Historical Stories of Mangshi (Volume 1, 2017)] (in Chinese). Mangshi: Dehong Nationalities Publishing House. ISBN 978-7-5558-0976-0.
