= Manghai =

Manghai Town 芒海镇
- Town
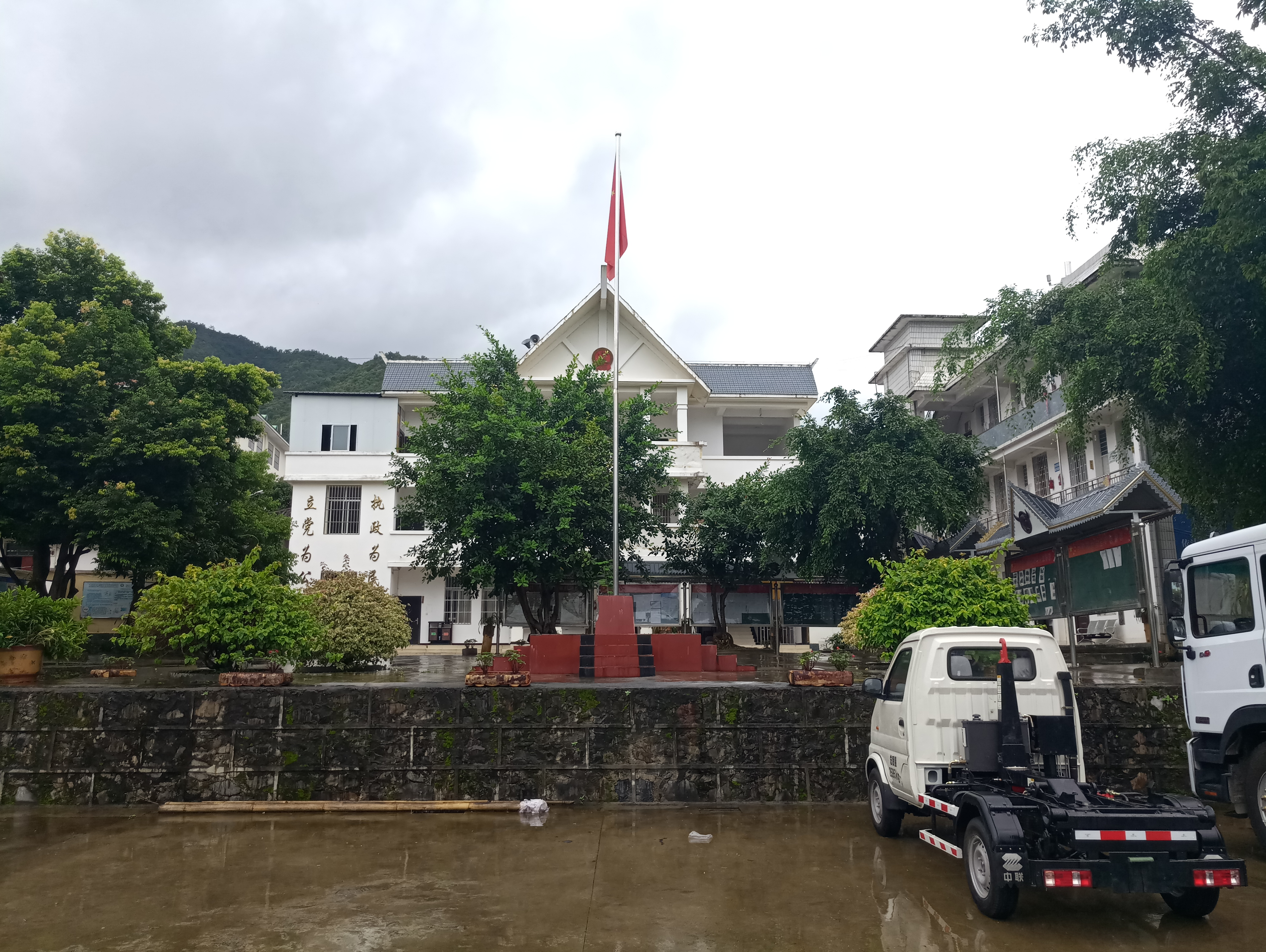
- The Government building of Manghai.

- Location of the town region in Mangshi

- Location in Yunnan
- Coordinates: 24.117449°N 98.317746°E
- Country: People's Republic of China
- Province: Yunnan
- Prefecture-level city: Dehong Dai and Jingpo Autonomous Prefecture
- County-level city: Mangshi

Area
  - Total: 105 km^{2} (41 sq mi)

Population (2017)
  - Total: 6,777
  - Density: 64.5/km^{2} (167/sq mi)
- Time zone: UTC+08:00 (China Standard)
- Postal code: 678401
- Area code: 0692

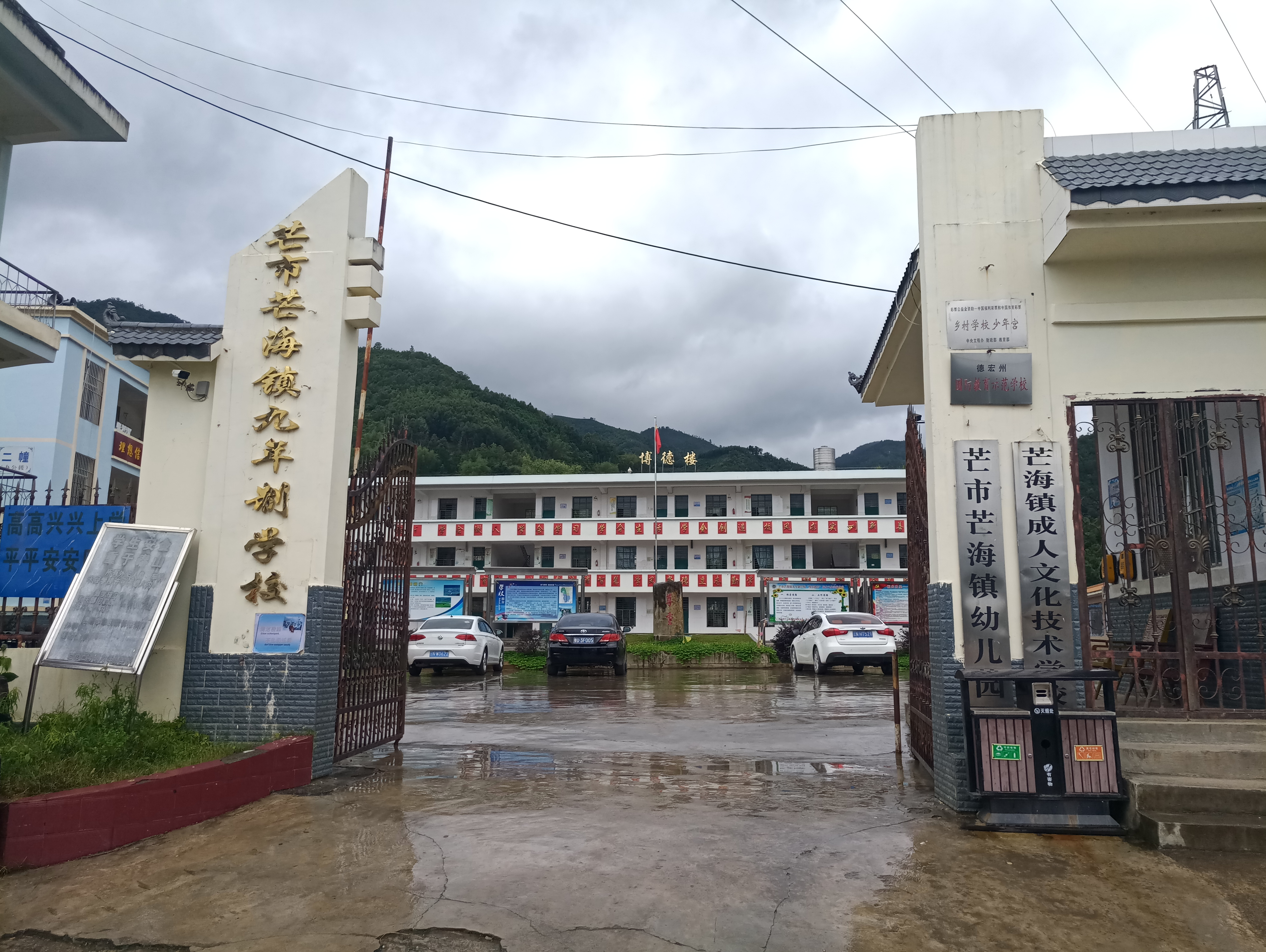
Manghai Nine-year School.

Manghai (simplified Chinese: 芒海镇; traditional Chinese: 芒海鎮; pinyin: Mánghǎi Zhèn) is a town in Mangshi, Yunnan, China. As of the 2017 census it had a population of 6,777 and an area of 105 square kilometres (41 sq mi). It is surrounded by Zhefang Town on the northwest, Mengga Town and Dongshan Township on the east, and Myanmar on the south.

== Administrative divisions ==
As of December 2015, the town is divided into 3 villages:

- Manghai (芒海村)
- Lüyin (吕尹村)
- Lainan (赖南村)

== Geography ==
=== Climate ===
The town has a subtropical climate with an annual rainfall of 1,650-millimetre (65 in), a long sunshine time and an annual average temperature of 19.5 °C (67.1 °F). The highest elevation is 2,147-metre (7,044 ft) and the lowest is 870-metre (2,850 ft).

== Economy ==
The economy is supported primarily by farming, ranching and frontier trade. The traditional industries are rice, tea, sugarcane, animal husbandry and tsao-ko. The emerging industries are walnut, coffee, macadamia nut and bamboo industry.

== Education ==
- Manghai Nine-year School

== Transportation ==
The National Highway G320 passes across the town.
