= Hogood Coffee =

Chinese maker of coffee products

Dehong Hogood Coffee Co., Ltd.
- Headquarters: Mangshi, Dehong Autonomous Prefecture, Yunnan
- Key people: Xiong Xiangren (founder)
- Products: Whole bean coffee, Instant coffee
- Revenue: Over RMB 1 billion (US$153 million) (2017)

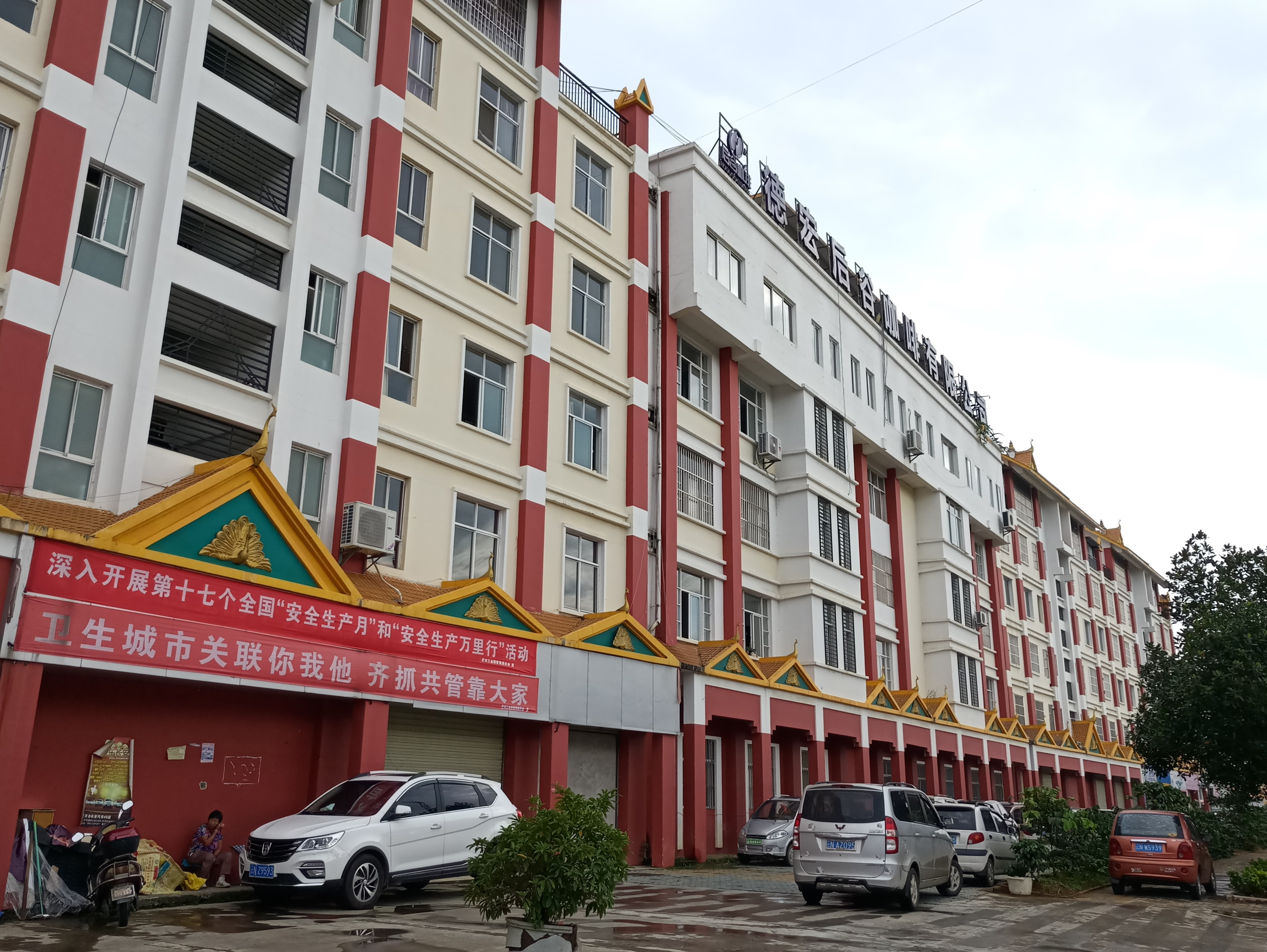
Hogood Coffee headquarter in Mangshi

Hogood Coffee (Chinese: 后谷咖啡; pinyin: Hòugǔ Kāfēi) is a Chinese maker of coffee products. It is the largest domestic instant coffee producer.

== Corporate affairs ==
The company's second largest shareholder is Chongqing Energy International (Hong Kong) Co Ltd., which also established the Chongqing Coffee Exchange, a spot trading center for coffee beans.

== History ==
The company was founded in 2007. It had been a supplier of coffee beans to Nestle before launching its own brand of instant coffee. Hogood Coffee, launched instant coffee with walnut protein powder instead of non-dairy creamer.

== Planting and processing ==
Hogood plants much of the coffee in its home region of Dehong, one of the 3 primary regions for coffee cultivation in Yunnan. The company contracts farm land from smallholders and plants seedlings, and then re-contracts the land back to farmers to purchase the coffee beans from the farmers at harvest. Due to the smallholdings typical in China, by employing a scheme to consolidate farm lands, productivity is increased. The success of the scheme relies on relaxed land use laws.

The company is investing in a RMB 1 billion (US$145 million) scheduled to be completed in 2018 to produce an announced 10,000 tonnes of freeze-dried coffee, 2,000 tonnes of liquid coffee concentrate and 3,000 tonnes of baked coffee beans annually.

== Marketing and exports ==
Hogood markets its own brand of instant coffee and roasted whole beans. In the domestic market for instant coffee, Nestle dominates with a market share of over 70% while Hogood only held 2.7% in 2014.

Hogood accounts for about half of the country's coffee exports. Since July 2015 the company has shipped coffee to Europe through the Chongqing-Xinjiang-Europe railway link, which passes through Kazakhstan before reaching Duisburg, Germany, taking 14 days over the 30-35 days of the earlier used sea route from Guangzhou.

== In popular culture ==
During a Ministry of Foreign Affairs reception in Beijing in February 2017 to introduce Yunnan to the diplomatic community, Minister of Foreign Affairs Wang Yi praised the company: "The coffee I just drank is called Hogood. I am not exaggerating -- this is the best coffee that I have ever tasted as a globetrotter."
