= Zhongshan, Mangshi =

Zhongshan Township 中山乡
- Township
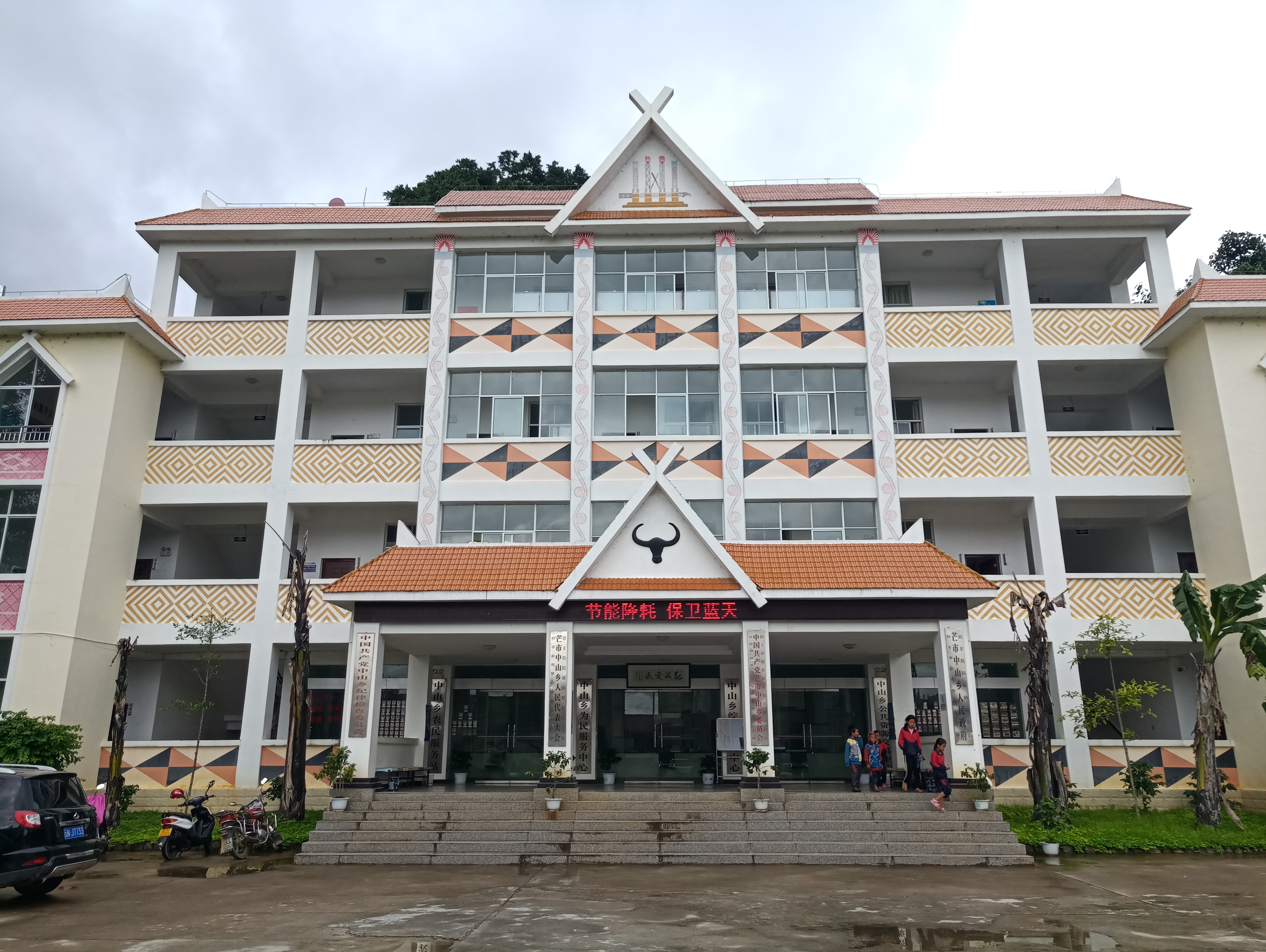
- The Government building of Zhongshan Township.

- Location of the township region in Mangshi

- Location in Yunnan
- Coordinates: 24.13591°N 98.580829°E
- Country: People's Republic of China
- Province: Yunnan
- Prefecture-level city: Dehong Dai and Jingpo Autonomous Prefecture
- County-level city: Mangshi

Area
  - Total: 278 km^{2} (107 sq mi)

Population (2017)
  - Total: 12,488
  - Density: 44.9/km^{2} (116/sq mi)
- Time zone: UTC+08:00 (China Standard)
- Postal code: 678406
- Area code: 0692

Zhongshan Township (simplified Chinese: 中山乡; traditional Chinese: 中山鄉; pinyin: Zhōngshān Xiāng) is a township in Mangshi, Yunnan, China. As of the 2017 census it had a population of 12,488 and an area of 278 square kilometres (107 sq mi). It is adjacent to Myanmar.

== Administrative divisions ==
As of December 2015, the township is divided into 5 villages:

- Mangbing (芒丙村)
- Xiaoshuijing (小水井村)
- Huangjiazhai (黄家寨村)
- Saigang (赛岗村)
- Muchengpo (木城坡村)

== Economy ==
The local economy is primarily based upon agriculture and animal husbandry.

== Education ==
- Zhongshan Township Middle School
- Zhongshan Township Central Primary School

== Transport ==
The Mengxiao Road passes across the township east to west.
