= Sino-Burmese wars =

There have been several Sino-Burmese wars—wars between China and Burma (Myanmar)—in history:

- First Mongol invasion of Burma (1277–1287)
- Second Mongol invasion of Burma (1300–1302)
- Ava-Ming War (1412-1415)
- Sino-Burmese War (1582–1584)
- Sino-Burmese War (1593)
- Sino-Burmese War (1661–1662)
- Sino-Burmese War (1765–1769)

== See also ==
- Luchuan–Pingmian campaigns (1436–1449)
- Kuomintang Islamic insurgency in Burma (1950–58)
- 1960–61 campaign at the China–Burma border
