= Jiangdong, Mangshi =

Jiangdong Township 江东乡
- Township
- Location of the township region in Mangshi

- Location in Yunnan
- Coordinates: 24.516598°N 98.398971°E
- Country: People's Republic of China
- Province: Yunnan
- Prefecture-level city: Dehong Dai and Jingpo Autonomous Prefecture
- County-level city: Mangshi

Area
  - Total: 220.8 km^{2} (85.3 sq mi)

Population (2017)
  - Total: 32,554
  - Density: 147.4/km^{2} (381.9/sq mi)
- Time zone: UTC+08:00 (China Standard)
- Postal code: 678403
- Area code: 0692

Jiangdong Township (simplified Chinese: 江东乡; traditional Chinese: 江東鄉; pinyin: Jiāngdōng Xiāng) is a township in Mangshi, Yunnan, China. As of the 2017 census it had a population of 32,554 and an area of 220.8 square kilometres (85.3 sq mi). It is surrounded by Wuchalu Township and Xuangang Township on the northwest, Hetou Township of Longling County on the east, and Mengyang Town of Lianghe County on the south.

== Administrative divisions ==
As of December 2015, the township is divided into 8 villages:

- Hetou (河头村)
- Xianrendong (仙仁洞村)
- Manglong (芒龙村)
- Gaogengtian (高埂田村)
- Hualachang (花拉厂村)
- Dashuijing (大水井村)
- Dashuigou (大水沟村)
- Liziping (李子坪村)

== Geography ==
The highest point in the township is Mount Dadianhe (打靛河) which stands 2,303 metres (7,556 ft) above sea level. The lowest point is Lianhekou (连河口) which stands 826 metres (2,710 ft) above sea level.

== Economy ==
The local economy is primarily based upon agriculture and animal husbandry. The main cash crops are tea, grain and sugarcane.

== Education ==
- Jiangdong Township Central Primary School
- Jiangdong Township Middle School

== Transport ==
The County Road X024 passes across the township.
