= Mangshi Town =

Mangshi Town 芒市镇
- Town
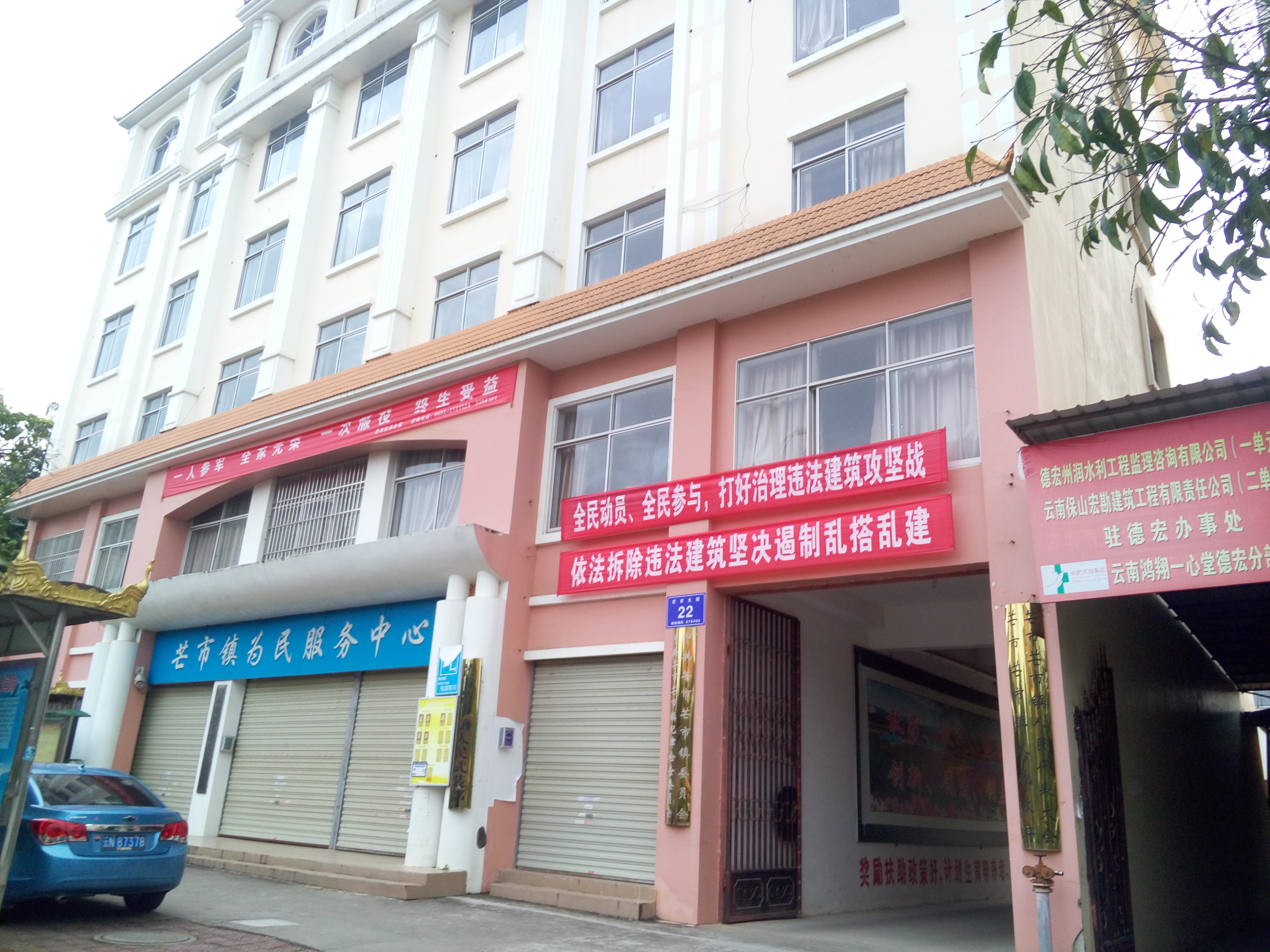
- The Mangshi Town Government building.

- Location of the town region in Mangshi

- Location in Yunnan
- Coordinates: 24.453881°N 98.588694°E
- Country: People's Republic of China
- Province: Yunnan
- Prefecture-level city: Dehong Dai and Jingpo Autonomous Prefecture
- County-level city: Mangshi

Area
  - Total: 359 km^{2} (139 sq mi)

Population (2017)
  - Total: 46,223
  - Density: 129/km^{2} (333/sq mi)
- Time zone: UTC+08:00 (China Standard)
- Postal code: 678499
- Area code: 0692

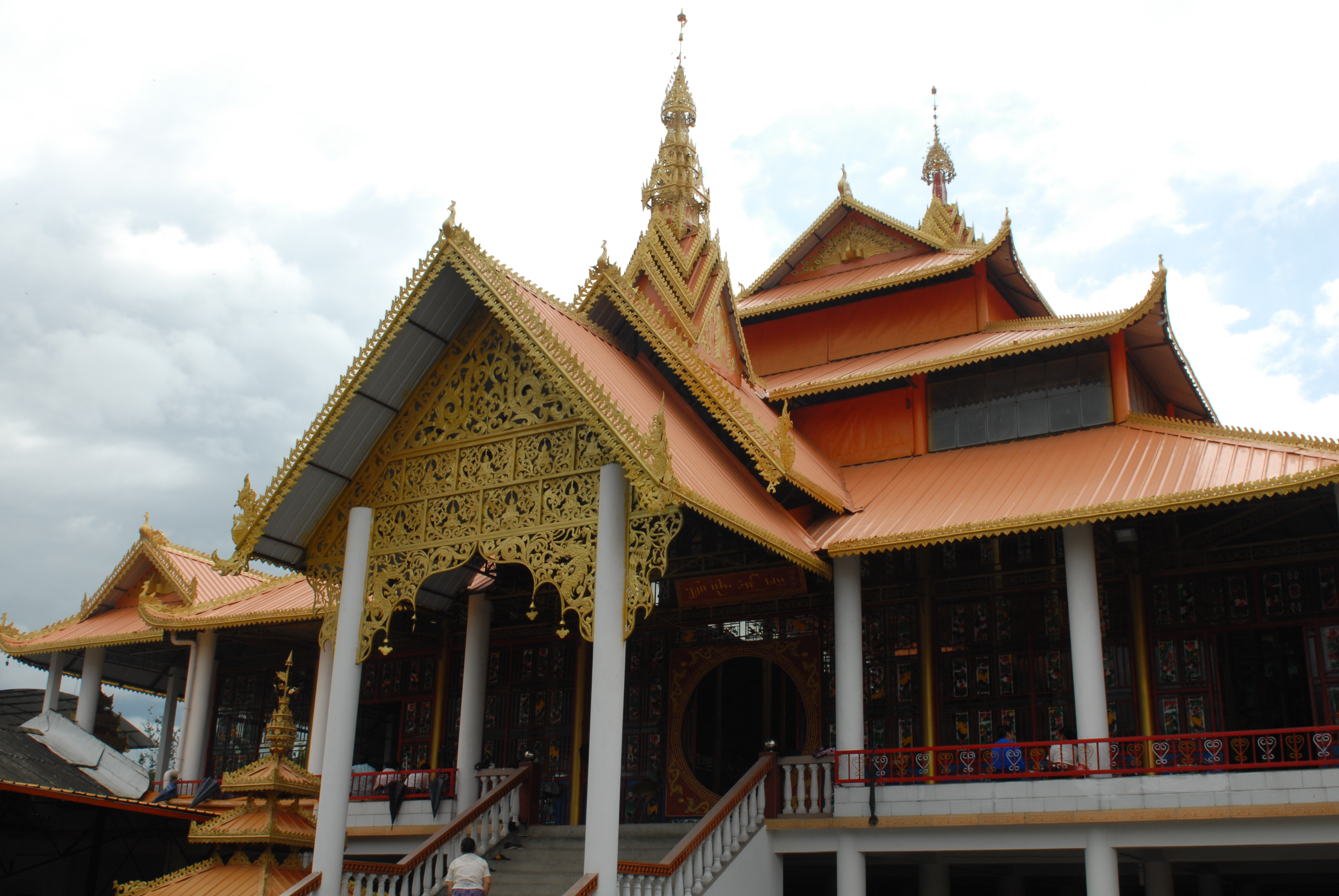
Zhe'anyin Temple.

Mangshi Town (simplified Chinese: 芒市镇; traditional Chinese: 芒市鎮; pinyin: Mángshì Zhèn) is an urban town in Mangshi, Yunnan, China. As of the 2017 census it had a population of 46,223 and an area of 359 square kilometres (139 sq mi). It borders Xiangda Township and Longshan Town in the north and east, and FengpingTown and Xuangang Township in the west and south.

== Administrative divisions ==
As of December 2015, the town is divided into 10 villages:

- Dawan (大湾村)
- Songshuzhai (松树寨村)
- Manghe (芒核村)
- Lahuai (拉怀村)
- Huixian (回贤村)
- Zhongdong (中东村)
- Xiadong (下东村)
- Xiangguntang (象滚塘村)
- Hexinchang (河心场村)
- Yunmao (云茂村)

== History ==
Mangshi was incorporated as a town in 1954, after the establishment of the Communist State.

In 1969, it was renamed "Dongfanghong Commune" (东方红公社).

In 1984 it reverted to its former name of "Mangshi Town".

In 2005, Chengjiao Town (城郊镇) and Guntang Township (滚塘乡) were incorporated into the town.

In 2007, Menghuan Subdistrict separated from Mangshi Town.

== Geography ==
Mangshi Town located in northern Mangshi city.

The highest point in the town is Mount Beiyin (背阴山), which, at 2,377 metres (7,799 ft) above sea level. The lowest point is Guangmu Village (广母村) which stands 807 metres (2,648 ft) above sea level.

The Nannai River (南乃河), Manggang River (芒岗河), Huyang River (户阳河), Shaozhi River (邵址河) and Banguo River (板过河) flow through the town.

=== Climate ===
The town is in the tropical basin climate zone, with an average annual temperature of 19.5 °C (67.1 °F), a frost-free period of 365 days and annual average sunshine hours in 2000 to 2452 hours. Summer is not hot, winter is not cold. The highest temperature is 36.2 °C (97.2 °F), and the lowest temperature is −0.6 °C (30.9 °F).

== Economy ==
Jewelry is the main source of local economy.

Mangshi Economic Development Zone is located in the town.

== Education ==
- Mangshi Central Primary School
- Mangshi No. 1 School
- Mangshi Suburban Middle School
- Mangshi Minzu High School

== Attractions ==
Menglongsha Park (勐垅沙公园) is a public urban park in the town.

Zhe'anyin Temple (遮安银寺), Wuyun Temple (五云寺) and Puti Temple (菩提寺) are Buddhist temples in the town.

Mengbana Garden (勐巴娜西珍奇园) is an AAAA-level scenic spot in the town.

== Transportation ==
The National Highway G320 passes across the town.
