= Chashan language =

Burmish language of China

Chashan
- Echang
- Native to: China
- Region: Yunnan
- Native speakers: 587 (2010)
- Language family: Sino-Tibetan: (Tibeto-Burman); Lolo–Burmese; Burmish; Maruic; Chashan

Language codes
- ISO 639-3: (included in Lashi [lsi])
- Glottolog: chas1234

Chashan (Chinese: 茶山; autonym: ŋɔ³¹tʃʰaŋ⁵⁵) is a Burmish language spoken in Pianma Township (片马镇), Lushui County, Yunnan, China, in Xiapianma (下片马), Gangfang (岗房), and Gulang (古浪) villages. It is closely related to Lashi, and has 56.3% lexical similarity with Lashi of Lushui County out of a sample of 1,000 vocabulary words.

In Pianma Township, there are 587 Chashan people officially classified as ethnic Lisu. The local people consider the Chashan to be a distinct ethnic group, separate from the Jingpo people (景颇族). The Chashan autonym is ŋɔ³¹tʃʰaŋ⁵⁵ (Echang 峨昌), similar to that of the Achang. More Chashan speakers may be found across the border in Kachin State, Myanmar.
