= Achang people =

Achang
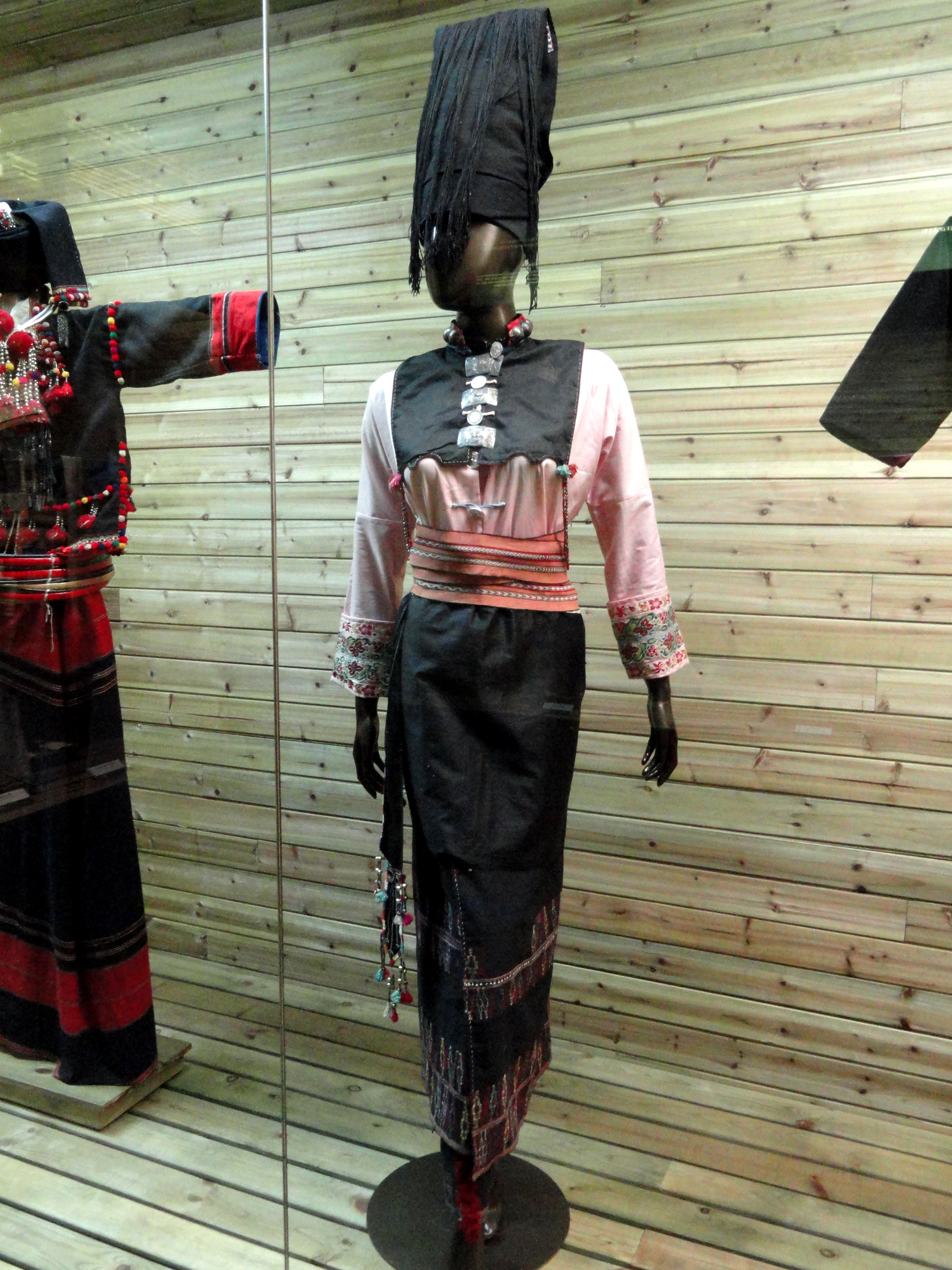
- Achang woman's dress

Total population
- 43,775 (2020 census)

Regions with significant populations
- People's Republic of China, mostly concentrated in Yunnan province, smaller population in Burma

Languages
- Achang, Xiandao (SIL, khan31tao31), Burmese, and Southwestern Mandarin

Religion
- Theravada Buddhism, Taoism, and a mixture of animism and ancestor worship.

Related ethnic groups
- Bamar, Rakhine, Yi, and other Tibeto-Burman-speaking peoples

The Achang (Chinese: 阿昌族; pinyin: Āchāngzú), also known as the Ngac'ang (their own name) is an ethnic group. They are one of the peoples who speak Tibeto-Burman languages. They form one of the 56 ethnic groups officially recognized by the People's Republic of China. They also live in Myanmar, where they're known as Maingtha (Burmese: မိုင်းသာလူမျိုး) in Shan State and Ngochang in Kachin State.

The Achang number approximately 43,775, with most residing in Yunnan province, primarily in Lianghe County of Dehong Autonomous Prefecture. The Achang speak a Burmish language, related to Burmese, known as Achang. However, there is no indigenous writing system for the language, and Chinese characters are often used instead. Many Achang also speak Tai Lü language, mainly for commercial transactions with the Dai people.

The Husa Achang (戶撒), living in Longchuan County (also in Dehong), speak a distinct dialect and consider themselves to be a separate group. In the 1950s, they filed an unsuccessful application to be recognized as a distinct nationality. The Husa are more Sinicized than other Achang, with Confucian-style ancestral memorial tablets commonly found in their homes. Most traditional Husa people practice a mixture of Theravada Buddhism and Taoism.

== History ==
The Achang are descendants of the Qiang tribes that inhabited the border region between Sichuan, Gansu, and Sichuan provinces around 2,000 years ago. They lived in the Yunlong area during the Yuan dynasty (1271–1268 AD). The Achang people are considered one of Yunnan's earliest inhabitants. Their leader, Zaogai, established a rule that only the oldest son of the former leader could succeed to the position. The Achang community grew stronger and began establishing trade relationships with other kingdoms such as Jinchi and Bo. The Achang are also descendants of the Xunchuan people from the Tang dynasty. In 1383 AD, during the reign of Emperor Hongwu of the Ming dynasty, the Achang people, under the leadership of Zuona, pledged allegiance to the emperor. During the Hongwu period, Duanbo, from the Han nationality, was appointed as the governor of the Yunlong Region, and from that point on, the Achang ethnic group began to decline. They subsequently moved to the Dehong region in the southwest, losing their native land. Today, more than 90 percent of the 33,936 Achang people live in Longchuan, Lianghe, and Luxi counties in the Dehong Dai-Jingpo Autonomous Prefecture in southwestern Yunnan Province. The remaining Achang live in Longling County, in the neighboring Baoshan Prefecture.

== Culture ==
Much of the Achang's history and traditions have been passed down through music and songs. Music is an integral part of their culture, and they typically end all celebrations with songs and dances.

During Buddhist funerals, the Achang tie a long fabric tape (about 20 metres (66 ft)) to the coffin. During the ceremony, the monk walks ahead, holding the tape to guide the soul of the deceased toward its final destination. The deceased is buried without any metallic items, such as jewelry, as these are believed to contaminate the soul for future reincarnation.
