= Burmish languages =

Sino-Tibetan language group

Burmish
- Geographic distribution: Myanmar, Bangladesh, India
- Linguistic classification: Sino-Tibetan: Tibeto-Burman; Burmo-Qiangic?; Lolo-Burmese; Burmish
- Subdivisions: Northern Burmish; Southern Burmish

Language codes
- Glottolog: burm1266

The Burmish languages are a subgroup of the Sino-Tibetan languages consisting of Burmese (including Standard Burmese, Arakanese, and other Burmese dialects such as the Tavoyan dialects) as well as non-literary languages spoken across Myanmar and South China such as Achang, Lhao Vo, Lashi, and Zaiwa.

The various Burmish languages have a total of 35 million native speakers.

== Names ==
Many Burmish names are known by various names in different languages (Bradley 1997).

Names of Burmish languages
Autonym	Jinghpaw name	Burmese name	Chinese name
Lawngwaw	Maru	မရူ	Làngsù 浪速
Tsaiwa	Atsi	ဇိုင်ဝါး/အဇီး	Zǎiwǎ 载瓦
Lachik	Lashi	လချိဒ်	Lāqí 喇期, Lèqí 勒期
Ngochang	-	မိုင်သာ/အာချန်	Āchāng 阿昌
Pela	-	ပေါ်လာ	Bōlā 波拉

In China, the Zaiwa ဇိုင်ဝါး/အဇီး 载瓦 (local Chinese exonym: Xiaoshan ရှောင့်ရှန် 小山), Lhao Vo 浪速 (local Chinese exonym: Lang'e 浪峨), Lashi 勒期 (local Chinese exonym: Chashan 茶山), and Pela 波拉 are officially classified as Jingpo people (Bolayu Yanjiu). The local Chinese exonym for the Jingpho proper is Dashan 大山.

Dai Qingxia (2005:3) lists the following autonyms and exonyms for the various Burmish groups as well as for Jingpho, which is not a Burmish language, with both Chinese character and IPA transcriptions (given in square brackets).

Burmish autonyms and exonyms
Language	Lhao Vo people 浪速 လော်ဝေါ် လူမျိုး	Jingpho people 景颇 ဂျိန်းဖောလူမျိုး	Zaiwa people 载瓦 အဇီး/ဇိုင်းဝါး လူမျိုး	Lashi people 勒期 လချိတ် လူမျိုး	Pela people 波拉 ပေါ်လာလူမျိုး
Lhao Vo name 浪速语 လော်ဝေါ်အမည်	Lang'e 浪峨 [lɔ̃˥˩ vɔ˧˩] လော်‌ဝေါ်	Bowo 波沃 [pʰauk˥ vɔ˧˩] ပေါက်ဝေါ	Zha'e 杂蛾 [tsa˧˥ vɔ˧˩] ဇိုင်ဝါး/အဇီး	Lashi 勒期 [lă˧˩ tʃʰik˧˥] လချိတ်	Buluo 布洛 [pă˧˩ lɔ˧˩] ပါ့လော်
Jingpho name 景颇语 ဂျိန်းဖောအမည်	Moru 默汝 [mă˧˩ ʒu˧˩] မိုရူ	Jingpho 景颇 [tʃiŋ˧˩ pʰoʔ˧˩] ဂျိန်းဖော	Aji 阿纪 [a˧˩ tsi˥] အကျိ	Leshi 勒施 [lă˧˩ ʃi˥] လေရှီ	Boluo 波洛 [po˧˩ lo˧˩] ပေါလော်
Zaiwa name 载瓦语 ဇိုင်ဝါး/အဇီးအမည်	Lelang 勒浪[lă˨˩ la̠ŋ˥˩] လက်လင်	Shidong 石东 [ʃi˥ tu̠ŋ˥] ရှီထုင်	Zaiwa 载瓦 [tsai˧˩ va˥˩]ဇိုင်ဝ	Lashi 勒期 [lă˨˩ tʃʰi˥] လချိ	Buluo 布洛 [pă˨˩ lo˨˩] ပါ့လော်
Lashi name 勒期语 လရှီအမည်	Langwu 浪悟 [laŋ˧˩ vu˥˩] လင်ဝူ	Puwu 铺悟 [pʰuk˥ vu˥˩] ပေ ပါက်ဝူ	Zaiwu 载悟 [tsai˧˩ vu˥˩] ဇိုင်ဝု	Lashi 勒期 [lă˧˩ tʃʰi˥˩] လချိတ်	Buluo 布洛 [pă˧˩ lɔ˥˩] ပါလော်
Pela name 波拉语 ပေါ်လာအမည်	Longwa 龙瓦 [lõ˧˩ va˧˩] လုင်းငွာ	Baowa 泡瓦 [pʰauk˧˩ va˧˩] ပေါက်ဝါ	Diwa 氐瓦 [ti˧˩ va˧˩]တိဝါ	Lashi 勒期 [lă˧˩ tʃʰi˥] လချိတ်	Pela 波拉 [po˧˩ la˧˩] ပေါ်လာ

Autonyms are:

- Lhao Vo လန့်စု 浪速 (Lang'e 浪峨): lɔ̃˥˩ vɔ˧˩
- Jingpho ဂျိန်းဖော 景颇: tʃiŋ˧˩ pʰoʔ˧˩
- Zaiwa အဇီး 载瓦: tsai˧˩ va˥˩
- Lashi လချိတ် 勒期: lă˧˩ tʃʰi˥˩
- Pela ပေါ်လာ 波拉: po˧˩ la˧˩

The Chashan refer to themselves as ŋɔ˧˩ tʃʰaŋ˥ (Echang 峨昌), the Jingpho as phuk˥, the Lashi as tsai˧wu˧˩ (tsai˧ wu˥ [商务印书馆].)

== Languages ==
=== Lama (2012) ===
Based on innovations in their tonal systems, Lama (2012: 177–179) classifies the languages as follows:

External image
- Map of the Burmish-Loloish languages. Demonstrates the Southern, Burmese cluster vs. Northern, Achang-Zaiwa cluster classification found in Lama (2012). Languages in the Burmish group of the Lolo-Burmese group appear in shades of blue.

- Burmish
  - Burmese cluster (Southern Burmish)
  - Achang–Zaiwa (Northern Burmish)
    - Achang cluster
      - Achang
    - Zaiwa cluster
      - Pela (Bola)
      - Leqi–Zaiwa
        - Lashi (Leqi)
        - Langsu (Maru), Zaiwa (Atsi)

Chashan, a recently discovered Northern Burmish language, is closely related to Lashi.

Maingtha is a Northern Burmish language whose speakers are classified as a Shan subgroup.

=== Nishi (1999) ===
Based on distinct treatment of the pre-glottalized initials of proto-Burmish, Nishi (1999: 68-70) divides the Burmish languages into two branches, Burmic and Maruic. The Burmic languages changed voiceless preglottalized stops into voiceless aspirate stops and preglottalized voiced sonorants into voiceless sonorants. The Maruic languages in contrast reflect voiceless preglottalized and affricate consonants as voiceless unaspirated and affricates with laryngealized vowels, and voiced preglottalized sonorants as voiced sonorants with laryngealized vowels. The Burmic languages include Burmese, Achang, and Xiandao. The Maruic languages include Atsi (Zaiwa), Lashi (Leqi), Maru (Langsu), and Bola. Nishi does not classify Hpon and Nusu.

Burmic

The Arakanese language retains r- separate from y-, whereas the two fall together in most Burmese dialects and indeed most Burmish languages. Tavoyan has kept kl- distinct. No dialect has kept ry- distinct from r-, but this may be an independent innovation in the various dialects. Merguiese is apparently the least well studied Burmese dialect.

- Burmese language (incl. Standard Burmese and Arakanese)
- Achang (Huang et al. 1992, Wannemacher 1995-7)
- Xiandao (Huang et al. 1992)
- ?Hpon/Hpun (Luce 1985: Charts S, T, V; Henderson 1986)
- Danu

Maruic

- Atsi (Zaiwa) (Burling 1967, Dai 1981, Yabu 1982, Xu and Xu 1984, Luce 1985: Charts S, T, V; Dai 1986, Huang et al. 1992, Wannemacher 1995-7, Wannemacher 1998)
- Bola (Dai et al.: 1991; Huang et al. 1992, Edmondson 1992)
- Lashi (Luce 1985: Charts S, T, V; Huang et al. 1992; Wannemacher 1995-7)
- Maru (Lhao Vo) (Clerk 1911, Burling 1967, Luce 1985: Charts S, T, V; Okell 1988; Dai et al.: 1991; Huang et al. 1992; Wannemacher 1995-7)
- Chashan also goes here

=== Mann (1998) ===
Mann (1998: 16, 137) in contrast groups together Achang, Bela (by which he probably means Bola), Lashi, Maru, and Atsi together as North Burmic.

=== Bradley (1997) ===
David Bradley places aberrant Ugong with Burmish rather than with Loloish:

- Ugong–Burmish
  - Ugong
  - Burmish
    - Burmese
    - Burmish
      - Hpun
      - Core Burmish
        - Maru, Atsi
        - Lashi, Achang; Bola; Chintau (= Xiandao)
