= Zaiwa language =

Burmish language

Zaiwa
- Tsaiwa, Tsaiva
- Pronunciation: [tsau³¹va⁵¹]
- Native to: China, Burma
- Native speakers: 150,000 (2021)
- Language family: Sino-Tibetan: (Tibeto-Burman); Lolo–Burmese; Burmish; Maruic; Zaiwa
- Writing system: Latin; Fraser

Language codes
- ISO 639-3: atb
- Glottolog: zaiw1241

Zaiwa (autonym: tsau³¹va⁵¹; 载瓦; Burmese: ဇိုင်ဝါး/အဇီး) is a Burmish language spoken in parts of southwest China and eastern Burma. There are around 100,000 speakers. It is also known as Atsi, its name in Jingpo. Zaiwa may be spelled 'Tsaiva' or 'Tsaiwa', and Atsi may be spelled 'Aci', 'Aji', 'Atshi', 'Atzi' or 'Azi'. Other names include Atsi-Maru, Szi and Xiaoshanhua. Pela (Bola), with 400 speakers, was once classified as a dialect. From the 1950s Zaiwa was written using the Roman script. A Gospel of Mark was published in Zaiwa in 1938 in the Fraser alphabet and in 1951 in the Roman script.

== Distribution ==
There are more than 70,000 Zaiwa speakers in Yunnan, China, including in:

- Bangwa (邦瓦), Longchuan County, Dehong Prefecture
- Zhanxi (盏西), Yingjiang County, Dehong Prefecture
- Xishan (西山), Mangshi, Dehong Prefecture

The Ethnologue lists Bengwa, Longzhun and Tingzhu as dialects.

In Myanmar, the Sadon (Sadung) dialect is the standard variety.

== Phonology ==
=== Consonants ===
Zaiwa has the following consonant sounds:

		Labial		Dental/ Alveolar		Palatal	Velar	
		plain	pal.	plain	sib.	Palatal	plain	pal.
Plosive/ Affricate	voiceless	p	pʲ	t	t͡s̪	t͡ʃ	k	kʲ
Plosive/ Affricate	aspirated	pʰ	pʰʲ	tʰ	t͡s̪ʰ	t͡ʃʰ	kʰ	kʰʲ
Fricative	voiceless	f			s̪	ʃ	x	xʲ
Fricative	voiced	v				ʒ		
Nasal		m	mʲ	n			ŋ	ŋʲ
Approximant		w		l		j		

=== Vowels ===
Zaiwa distinguishes between tense throat and lax throat vowel sounds:

	Front		Central		Back	
	lax	tense	lax	tense	lax	tense
Close	i	i̠			u	u̠
Mid	ɛ	ɛ̠	ə	ə̠	ɔ	ɔ̠
Open			a	a̠		
Syllabic			ɹ̩	ɹ̠̩		

=== Tones ===
Zaiwa has five tones. Three of these five tones are in unchecked syllables and the remaining two are in checked syllables. The tones are distinguished through a numbering system of one to five; one being the lowest pitch and five the highest pitch.
