= Jingpo people =

Ethnic group largely inhabiting the Kachin Hills of Myanmar, China and India

Jinghpo, Wunpong, Zaizo, Dungzo, 景頗, ဂျိန်းဖော
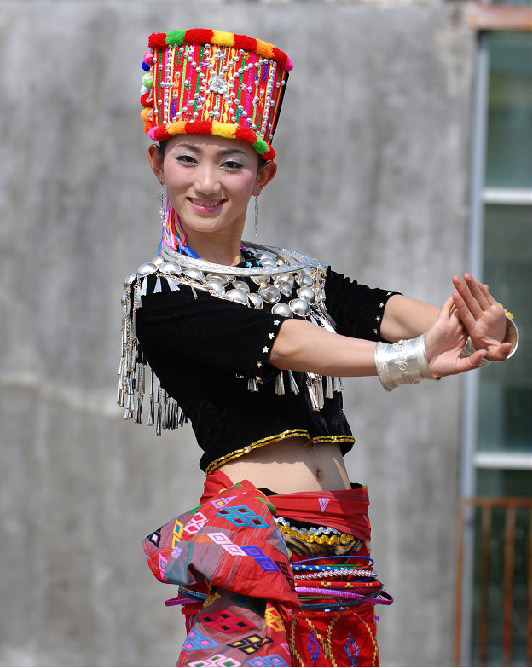
- Jingpo women in traditional dress in China

Regions with significant populations
- Myanmar: 1,000,000–1,500,000
- ∟Kachin State: 540,763
- China: 160,471 (2020 census)
- United States: 10,000
- India: 8,000
- Taiwan: 200

Languages
- Jingpo, Lisu, Zaiwa, Maru, Lashi, Pela, Burmese, and Southwestern Mandarin

Religion
- Majority: Christianity; Minority: Theravāda Buddhism; Animism

Related ethnic groups
- Other Southwest China ethnicities; (Bamar, Shan, Lisu, Qiang, Miao)

Jingpo people
- Chinese: 景颇族
Transcriptions
Standard Mandarin
- Hanyu Pinyin: Jǐngpō zú

Burmese name
- Burmese: ဂျိန်းဖော

The Jingpo people (Note: Alternative names: Jinghpaw, Jingpho, Singpho, Zaizo, Theinbaw, Singfo, and Chingpaw) (Burmese: ဂျိန်းဖော; Chinese: 景颇族; pinyin: Jǐngpō zú; siŋphou), also spelt Jinghpaw or Jingphaw, are a Tibeto-Burman ethnic group who inhabit northern Myanmar, northeastern India, and southwestern China. The Jingpo are the largest subgroup of the Kachin peoples. (Note: Lisu is considered as a tribe of Jinghpo only in Myanmar.) The Jingpo speak the Jingpo language, which is used as a lingua franca among the Kachin peoples and is distantly related to other Kachin languages.

== Ethnonyms ==
Jinghpaw as an ethnonym has an uncertain meaning with various theories. The oldest theories state that it simply means "man" or "person". Another theory suggests that Jinghpaw means "awakened people" and the word "hpaw" means to open such as an eye and refers to a state of civilisation. Another theory suggests it to be a corruption of chyinghpaw (transl. open drum) from a flood myth that they survived in a big drum. Modern scholars such as Li Xiangqian suggest it means "People who lorded over mine" as jum means salt in Jinghpaw. The Nagas refer to the Jinghpaw as Chinpok. The Tai-Ahome Assamese who can't pronounce "ch" call them "Singpho". The Burmese similarly call them Thainbaw. Early ethnographic documents posit that the name is a Tibetan term sin-po that alleges the Kachin as cannibals, which was adopted by the Kachin themselves.

Jingpo (Chinese: 景颇族; pinyin: Jǐngpō zú) is the Chinese exonym for the ethnic group. The endonym is Jinghpaw, which is also transcribed Jingphaw. In India, the Jingpo are known as the Singpho. Kachin is often used interchangeably with Jingpo, especially in Burmese, although the former more precisely refers to the collection of ethnic groups including the Jingpo.In Burmese historical text they were called as Theinbaw (သိန်းဖော).The Jingpo were previously known by various exonyms in Chinese: Echang, Zhexie, and Yeren (野人, lit. 'wild people')—the latter used in China from the Yuan dynasty until the formation of the People's Republic of China in 1949.

The Burmese government officially classifies the Jingpo as one of the 12 ethnic groups under the Kachin national race, while the Chinese government classifies the Jingpo as one of the country's 56 officially recognized ethnicities. In China, the Jingpo are divided into five subgroups, namely the Jingpo, Zaiwa, Leqi, Lang'e (Langsu) and Bola. The Indian government recognises the Singpho as a Scheduled Tribe.

=== Clans ===
The Singphos are divided into a number of clans, known as Gams, each under a chief. The principal Gams include the Bessa, Duffa, Luttao, Luttora, Tesari, Mirip, Lophae, Lutong and Magrong. The Singpho are also divided into four classes, namely Shangai, Myung, Lubrung and Mirip.

== Distribution ==
The Jingpo largely inhabit the Kachin Hills in northern Myanmar's Kachin State and neighbouring Dehong Dai and Jingpo Autonomous Prefecture of China.

In Myanmar (Burma), an estimated 630,000 Jingpo people live in Kachin State. In China, the Jingpo form one of the 55 ethnic minorities, where they numbered 147,828 people in the 2010 census.

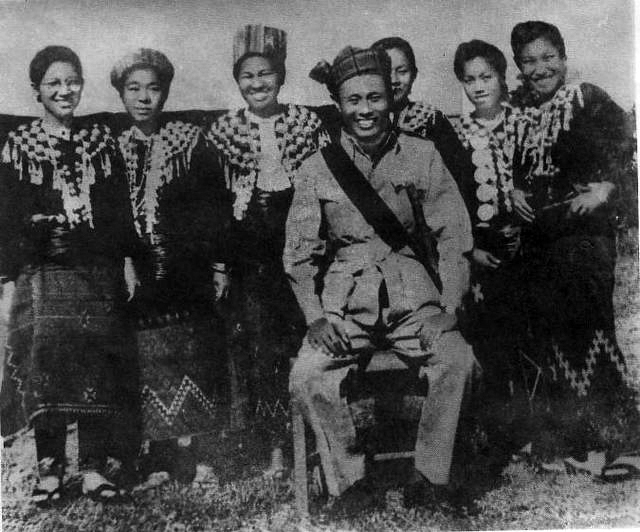
Aung San, the father of Myanmar's independence, and Jingpo ladies 1946

There is also a significant Jingpo community in northeast India, where they are known as the Singpho. The Singpho live in the state of Arunachal Pradesh in the district of Lohit and Changlang and in Assam inhabits in the district of Tinsukia and scattered in some other district like Sivasagar, Jorhat and Golaghat. Comprising a population of at least 7,900 in India, they live in the villages, namely Bordumsa, Miao, Innao, N-hpum, Namgo, Ketetong, Pangna, Phup, N-htem, Mungong, Kumchai, Pangsun, Hasak, Katha, Bisa, Dibong, Duwarmara, Namo and Namsai, etc. They speak the Singpho dialect of the Jingpo language.

Taiwan is home to a small Jingpo community numbering between 100 and 200, primarily in Taipei, Kaohsiung, Pingtung, Taitung, and other cities. They are the descendants of 52 tribespeople who were members of the Yunnan People's Anti-Communist Volunteer Army who fled to Taiwan after the defeat of the Kuomintang in mainland China. Every October, they host performances where they dance in traditional costumes. There is also a "Jingpo Taiwanese Friendship Association."

== History ==
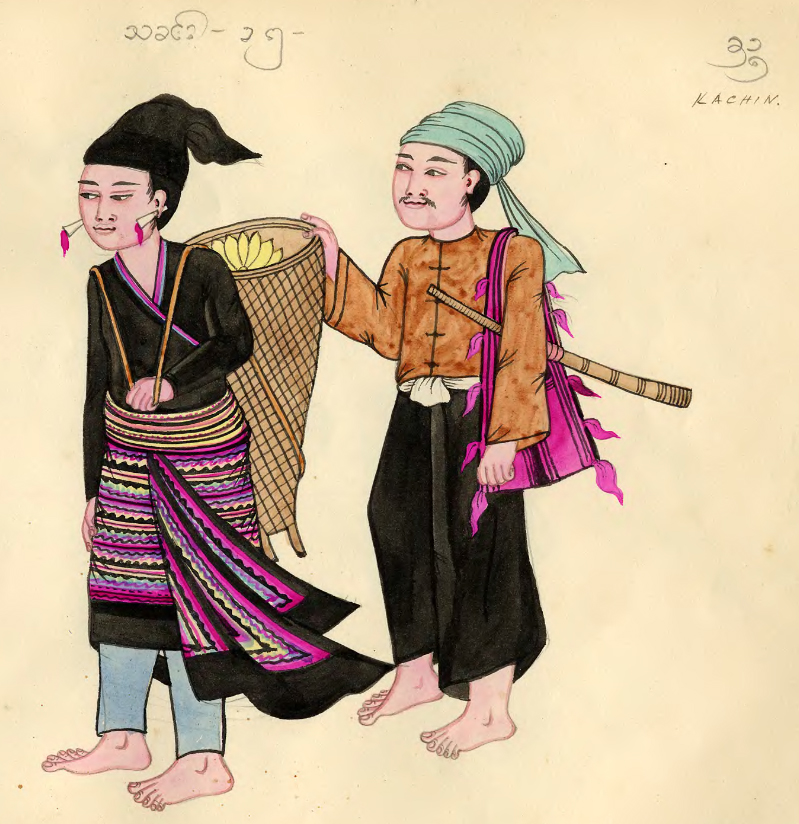
Kachin tribe, depiction from 1900s

The ancestors of the Jingpo people lived on the Tibetan Plateau and gradually migrated southward. Upon their arrival in the present-day province of Yunnan, the Jingpo were referred to as Xunchuanman.The Jingpo polity in Upper Myanmar was recognized as a tusi by the Chinese Ming dynasty and is referred to as Cha-shan in the Chinese chronicle Ming Shilu. According to the text, the polity extended from the Nmai River in today's Kachin State, Myanmar, eastward to Lu-shui County in Yunnan.

During the 15th and 16th centuries, the Jingpo continued migrating to their present territory. In the 17th century, the Jingpo were involved in trade exchanges between the Ahom kingdom and China, dealing in commodities such as ivory, copper, and silver. During the British colonial period, some tribes were well integrated into the state, while others operated with a large degree of autonomy. Kachin people, including those organized as the Kachin Levies, provided assistance to British units fighting the Japanese Imperial Army during World War II.

Following the end of World War II and Burma's independence from Britain, long-standing ethnic conflicts between frontier peoples such as the Kachin and the Burman-dominated central government resurfaced. The first uprising occurred in 1949 and escalated after the declaration of Buddhism (which is not practiced by the Kachin people) as the national religion in 1961. However, Kachin people fought both for and against the government during most of the ethnic conflicts. Kachin soldiers once formed a core part of the Burmese armed forces, and many remained loyal after the formation of the Kachin Independence Organisation (KIO) and its military wing, the Kachin Independence Army (KIA), in 1961. After Ne Win's coup in 1962, opportunities for Kachin people in the Burma Army diminished. For many years, much of Kachin State outside of cities and larger towns was administered by the KIO.

The KIO formed alliances with other ethnic groups resisting the Burmese government and, despite its non-communist stance, along with China, informally supported the Communist Party of Burma (CPB), which held strategically sensitive parts of the country adjacent to Kachin positions. The KIO continued to fight when Ne Win's dictatorship was succeeded by another incarnation of the military junta in 1988, called the State Law and Order Restoration Council (SLORC). However, with a gradual withdrawal of Chinese support, the CPB disintegrated in 1989 into warlord-led groups that negotiated ceasefire deals with the junta. This led to the KIO being surrounded by organizations effectively aligned with the SPDC. It was pressured by redeployed battalions of the rearmed and expanding Burma Army and urged to make peace by a civilian population suffering from years of warfare. In 1994, the KIO entered into a ceasefire with the junta. The ceasefire delivered neither security nor prosperity to the Kachin. Following the end of hostilities, the Burma Army's presence increased considerably, along with allegations of atrocities against the civilian population, including forced labor and rape. High demand from China is currently encouraging logging-based deforestation in the Kachin region of Burma. Increasingly impoverished, some Jingpo women and children are drawn into the sex trade in Thailand, China, and Yangon (KWAT 2005).

=== Displacement and migration ===
The Jingpo have migrated to Malaysia and Thailand due to the Kachin conflict. This conflict has caused Kachins to leave their homeland and seek asylum in Thailand and Malaysia. Since neither Thailand nor Malaysia are signatories to the 1951 Geneva Refugee Convention, these countries serve as temporary refuges for Kachin refugees, who must seek resettlement in third countries such as the US, Australia, Canada, New Zealand, and other EU nations through the UNHCR's resettlement program. Due to the high number of refugees in Malaysia, the resettlement process often takes five to seven years. Most Kachin refugees reside in IDP camps, with some in Malaysia.

== Religion ==
Around 90% of the Jingpo people in Myanmar follow Christianity, while the remaining 10% are animists or Theravada Buddhists. The majority of Singphos in India follow Theravāda Buddhism.

Before the arrival of Buddhism and Christianity, animism was widely followed; the ancestors of the Singpho or Jinghpaws worshiped spirits or gods, such as a well-known spirit named Madai. Jingpo animists believe that spirits reside everywhere, from the sun to animals, and that these spirits bring good or bad luck. For the Jingpo, all living creatures are believed to have souls. Rituals are carried out for protection in almost all daily activities, from planting crops to warfare.

== Culture ==
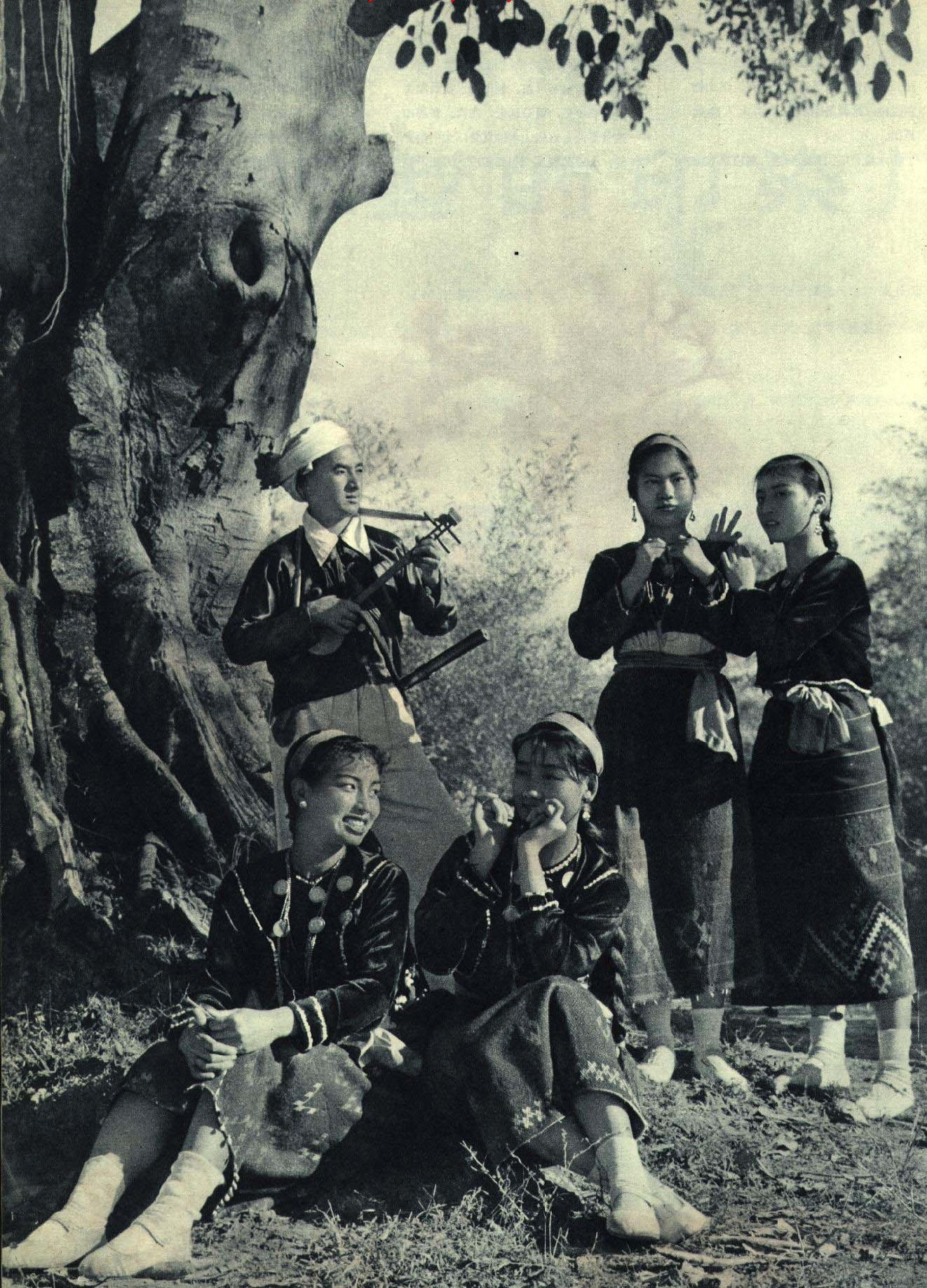
Jinpho singer in 1962

Traditional Jingpo dwellings are usually two stories and built out of wood and bamboo. The houses are of oval form; the first floor serves as storage and stable space, while the second is utilized for living quarters. Women often dress in black jackets with silver decorations and wear wool skirts made in bright colors. Men often wear white and black pants, covering their heads with turbans: youths with white turbans and adults with black turbans.

== Languages ==
=== Jingpo ===
Jingpo proper (spelled Jinghpaw in Jinghpaw) is spoken by 1,500,000 people in Burma and by 150,000 people in China. It is classified as Sino-Tibetan, Tibeto-Burman, Kachin–Luic, and is more closely related to Tibeto-Burman languages spoken in northeastern India, like the Northern Naga languages. Jingpo proper is also understood by many speakers of Zaiwa. The standard Jingpo dialect taught in China is based on the dialect of Enkun (in Yingjiang – west-northwest part of Dehong Prefecture). The Jingpo in India speak the Singpho dialect. Due to the dominance of Jingpo, it has been adopted as a common lingua franca among the Kachin peoples. Jingpo has significantly influenced the lexico-semantics of Zaiwa, Lhaovo, and Lacid, and to a lesser extent, Rawang and Lisu.

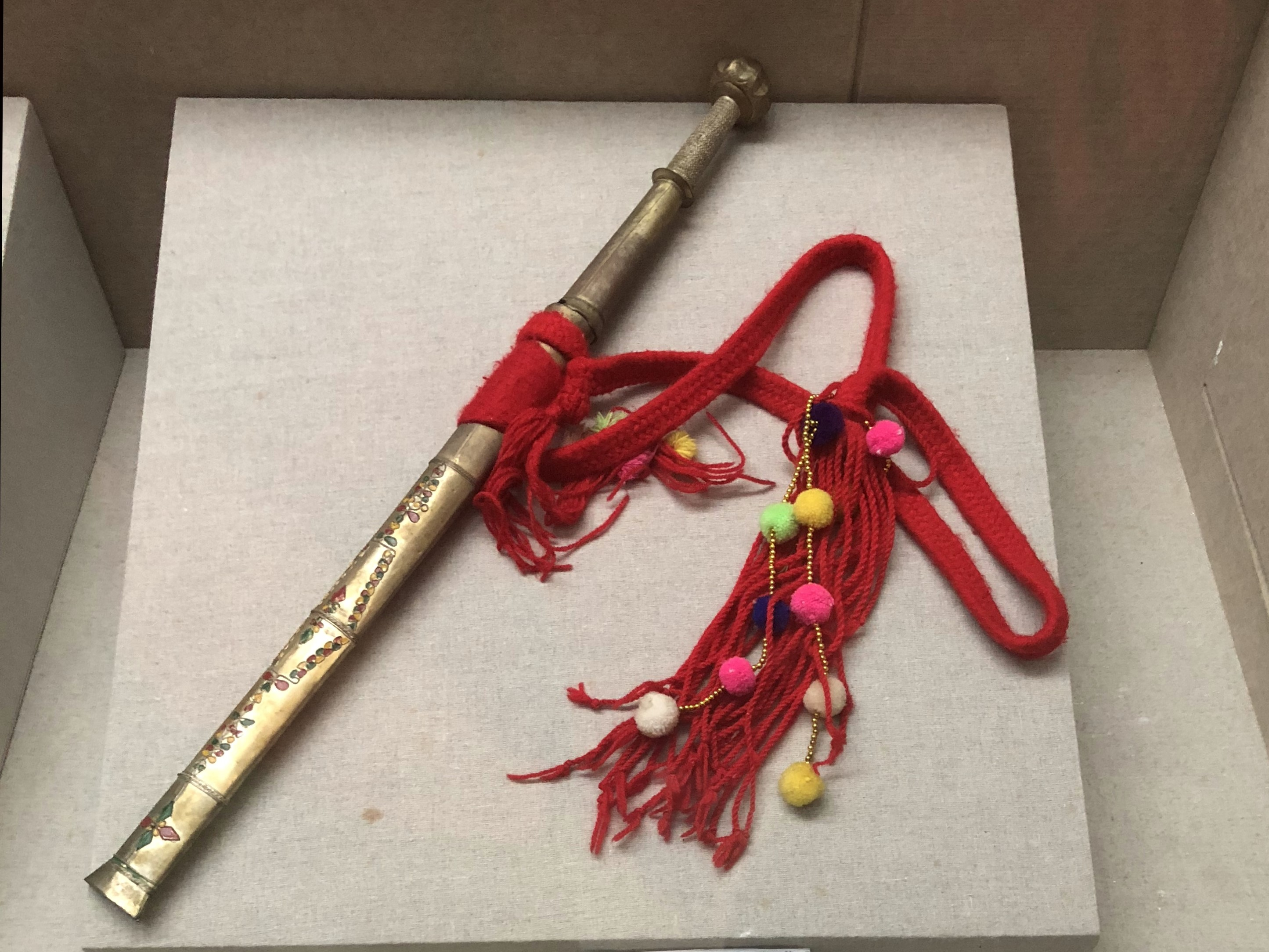
Jingpo sword used in traditional dance

=== Zaiwa ===
Zaiwa (also spelled Tsaiwa; called Atsi in Jingpo proper, Zǎiwǎyǔ (载瓦语) in Chinese, and Zi in Burmese) is spoken by approximately 80,000 people in China and 30,000 people in Burma. It is classified as Sino-Tibetan, Tibeto-Burman, Yi-Burman, and Northern Burmic, and is closely related to the Burmese language. After the establishment of the People's Republic of China, a written language based on the dialect of the village of Longzhun (in Xishan district in Luxi county) and using the Latin alphabet was created and officially introduced in 1957. Due to language contact, Zaiwa has been significantly influenced by Jingpo, especially in terms of its lexicon and semantics.

=== Other languages ===
Multilingualism is common among the Jingpo, and many Jingpo speak other Kachin languages, in addition to Burmese in Myanmar, Standard Chinese in China, Assamese in India, and Shan as a trade language.

== Lifestyle ==
Unlike most hill-people, shifting cultivation (jhum) is not as widely practiced, although tea is widely planted. When the British attempted to introduce Chinese tea plants for cultivation in Assam they were unsuccessful; they discovered that the Singpho people cultivated tea. By hybridizing the Singpho and Chinese strains and using Chinese tea cultivation techniques, the basis for large-scale tea cultivation in Assam was laid. The Singpho produce their tea by plucking the tender leaves and drying them in the sun and exposing them to the night dew for three days and nights. The leaves are then placed in the hollow tube of bamboo, and the cylinder will be exposed to the smoke of the fire. In this way, their tea can be kept for years without losing its flavor. The Singpho also depended on yams and other edible tubers as their staple food.

They are the earliest people to have used tea in India, but there is no substantial documentation of the history of tea drinking in the Indian subcontinent for the pre-colonial period. One can only speculate that tea leaves were widely used in ancient India since the plant is native to some parts of India. The Singpho tribe and the Khamti tribe, inhabitants of the regions where the Camellia sinensis plant grew native, have been consuming tea since the 12th century. It is also possible that tea may have been used under another name. Frederick R. Dannaway, in the essay "Tea As Soma", argues that tea was perhaps better known as "Soma" in Indian mythology.

Singpho dwellings are usually two stories and built out of wood and bamboo. The houses are of oval form; the first floor serves as a storage and stable while the second is utilized for living quarters.

== Dress ==
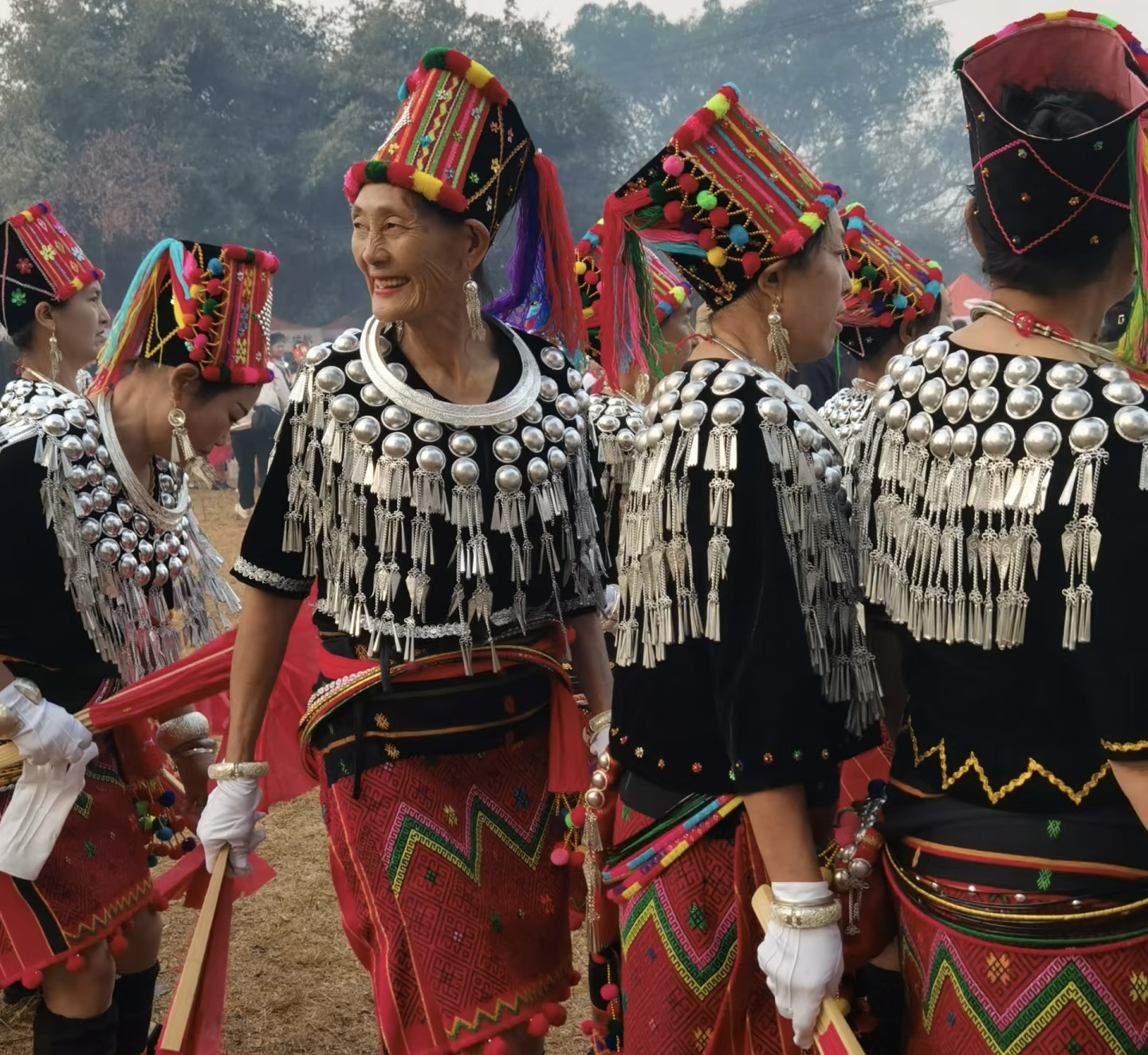
Jingpo women in traditional dress

The Jingpho made shields from buffalo hide; many of them can be as long as four feet. They also have helmets made from either buffalo hide or rattan-work, and vanished black and decorated with the boar's tusks. Most men tie their hair in a large knot on the crown of the head. The women dress their hair gathered into a broad knot on the crown of the head, fastening it by silver bodkins, chains and tassels, which is similar to the architecture of the modern skyscrapers. The maidens tie their tresses into a roll and keep them tied just above the nape. Women often dress in black jackets with silver decorations during a festival known as manau. They also wear wool skirts made in bright red colors. The men often wear a white shirt with colorful longyi, covering their heads with turbans.

== Notable people ==
- Duwa Lashi La, Acting President of National Unity Government NUG
- Angel Lamung, Burmese actress
- Hsu Eaint San, Burmese actress
- Bawmwang La Raw, founder of Kachin National Organisation
- Naung Na Jatan, Burmese politician
- Uyen Sinwa Nhpan Ja Ra, singer
- La John Ngan Hsai, businessman and politician
- N'Ban La, Kachin military leader
- Maran Brang Seng, Kachin military leader and politician
- Sumlut Gun Maw, Kachin military leader
- Khet Aung, Kachin politician
- Htang Gam Shawng, Kachin military leader
- Sibo Kai, Indian politician and Member of Legislative Assembly from Arunachal Pradesh
- Aung La Nsang, Burmese and American martial artist
- Sut Ring Pan, Burmese journalist

== Sources ==
- Lawn, Dan Seng (2022). "Ethnicity and Great Power Politics A Case of Transnational Ethnic Kachin of Myanmar and Singpho of Northeast India". In Lepcha, Charisma K.; Lal, Uttam (eds.). Communities, Institutiosn and Histories of India's Northeast. Taylor and Francis.
- Baruah, S. L. (1977). "Ahom Policy Towards the Neighbouring Hill Tribes". Proceedings of the Indian History Congress. 38: 249–256. JSTOR 44139078.
- Wade, Geoffrey (1994), The Ming Shi-lu (Veritable Records of the Ming Dynasty) as a Source for Southeast Asian History – 14th to 17th Centuries, Hong Kong
- Nawng, Kawlu Ma (1944). The history of the Kachins of the Hukawng Valley. Burma: Burma Frontier Service.
- E. R. Leach, Political Systems of Highland Burma: A Study of Kachin Social Structure (Boston: Beacon, 1965 [1954]).
- Kachin Women's Association Thailand (KWAT), Driven Away: Trafficking of Kachin women on the China-Burma border (Chiang Mai, Thailand, 2005).
- Fredrich Kahrl, Horst Weyerhaeuser, and Su Yufang, Navigating the Border: An Analysis of the China–Myanmar Timber Trade. Forest Trends, World Agroforestry Centre, 2004.
- Global Witness A Choice for China: Ending the destruction of Burma's frontier forests, 2005.
- Liú Lù, Jǐngpōzú yǔyán jiǎnzhì – Jǐngpōyǔ 刘璐景颇族语言简志——景颇语 (Introduction to a language of the Jingpo nationality – Jingpo; Běijīng 北京, Publishing House of Minority Nationalities 1984).
- Xú Xījiān 徐悉艰, Xú Guìzhēn 徐桂珍, Jǐngpōzú yǔyán jiǎnzhì – Zǎiwǎyǔ 景颇族语言简志——载瓦语 (Introduction to a language of the Jingpo nationality – Tsaiva; Běijīng 北京, Publishing House of Minority Nationalities 1984).
- All Kachin Students and Youth Union (AKSYU), Kachin Development Networking Group(KDNG), Valley of Darkness; 2007
- Valley of Darkness: Gold Mining and Militarization in Burma's Hugawng Valley (Chiang Mai, Thailand, 2007)
- Bradley, David. (1997). Tibeto-Burman languages of the Himalayas. Canberra: Australian National University Press. ISBN 9780858834569; OCLC 37646449
- Prandey, B. B. Pandey and D. K. Duarah. (1991). Myths and Beliefs on Creation of Universe Among the Tribes of Arunachal Pradesh. Itanagar, Arunāchal Pradesh (India): Directorate of Research, Government of Arunachal Pradesh. ISBN 9788175161061; OCLC 50424420
