= Dehong Dai and Jingpo Autonomous Prefecture =

Autonomous prefecture in Yunnan, China

- Autonomous prefecture

Name transcription(s)
  - Chinese: 德宏傣族景颇族自治州
  - Tai Nuea: ᥟᥪᥒᥱ ᥙᥪᥴ ᥓᥝᥲ ᥙᥩᥒ ᥛᥥᥝᥰ ᥖᥭᥰ ᥓᥤᥒ ᥚᥨᥝᥲ ᥖᥬᥲ ᥑᥨᥒᥰ
  - Jingpo: Sakhkung Sam Jinghpo Amyu Madu Uphkang Mungdo
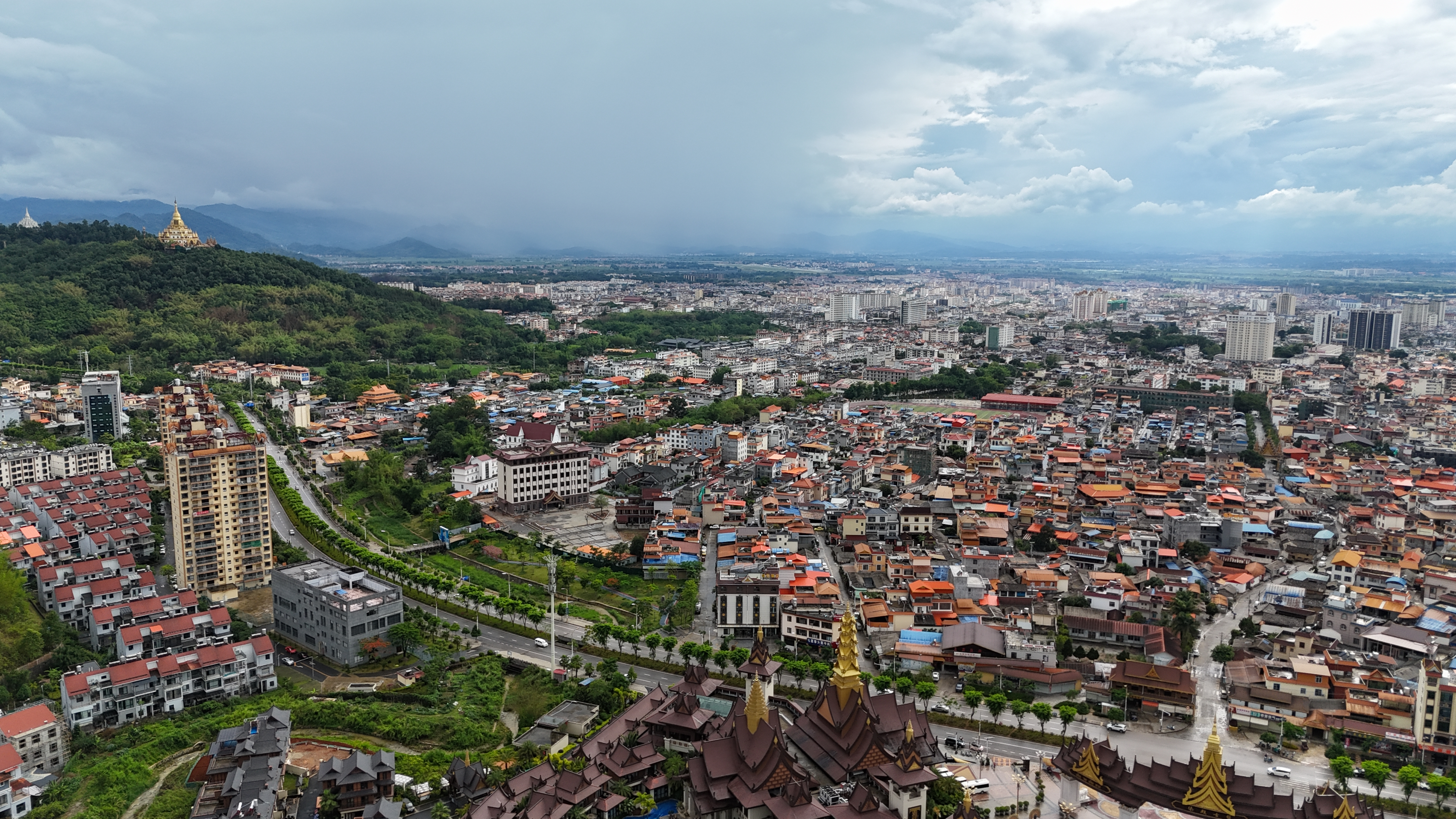
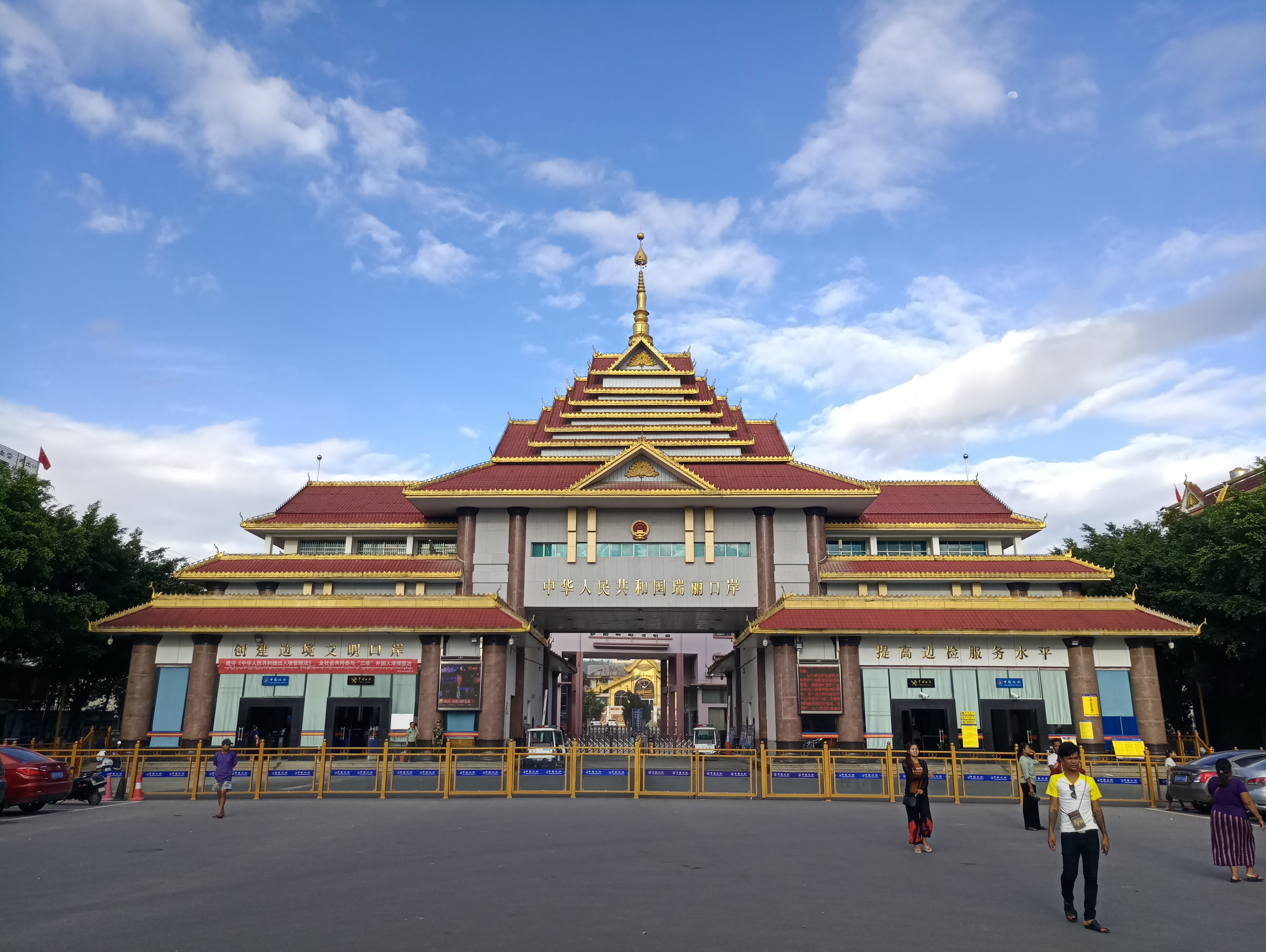
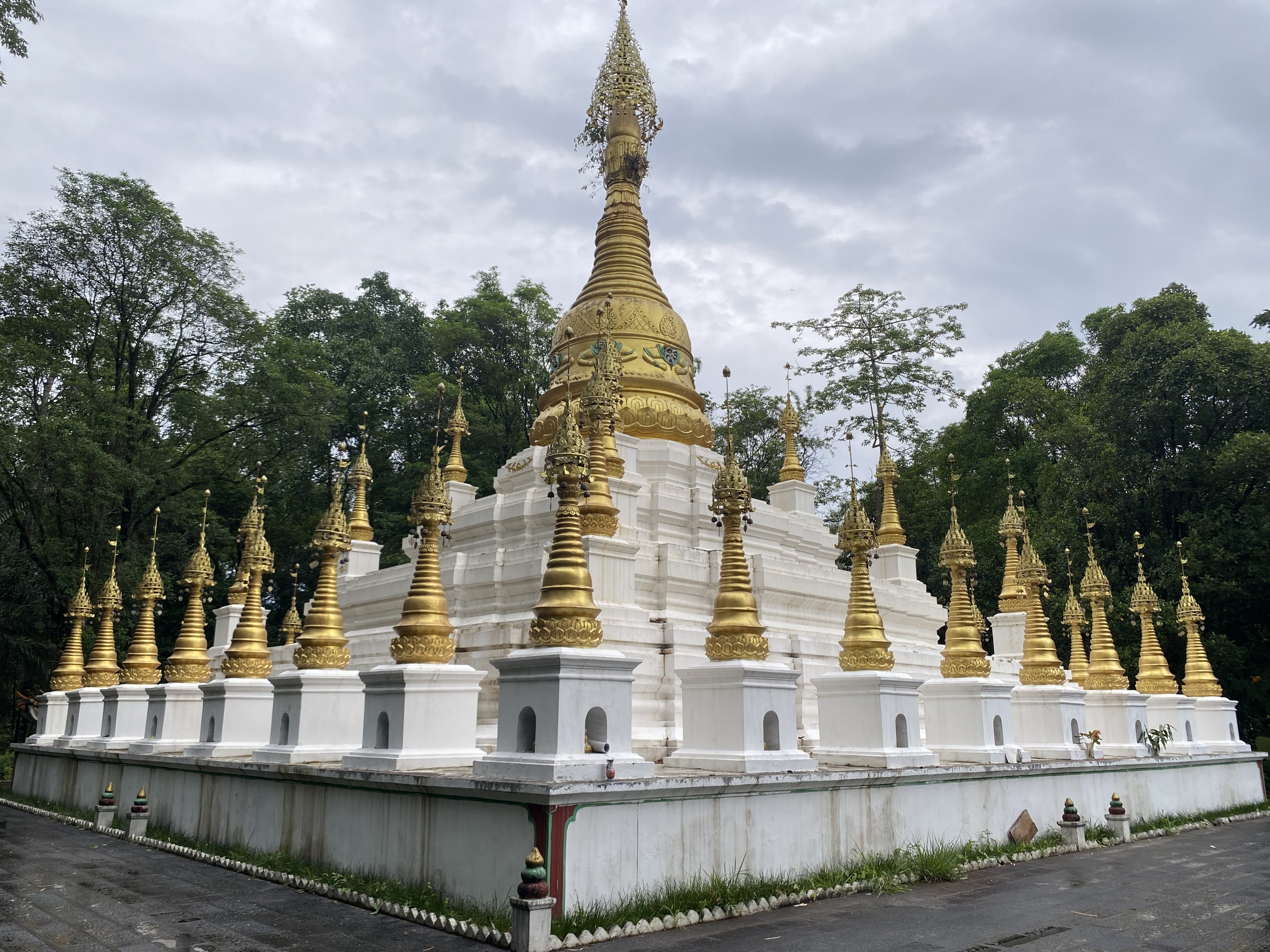
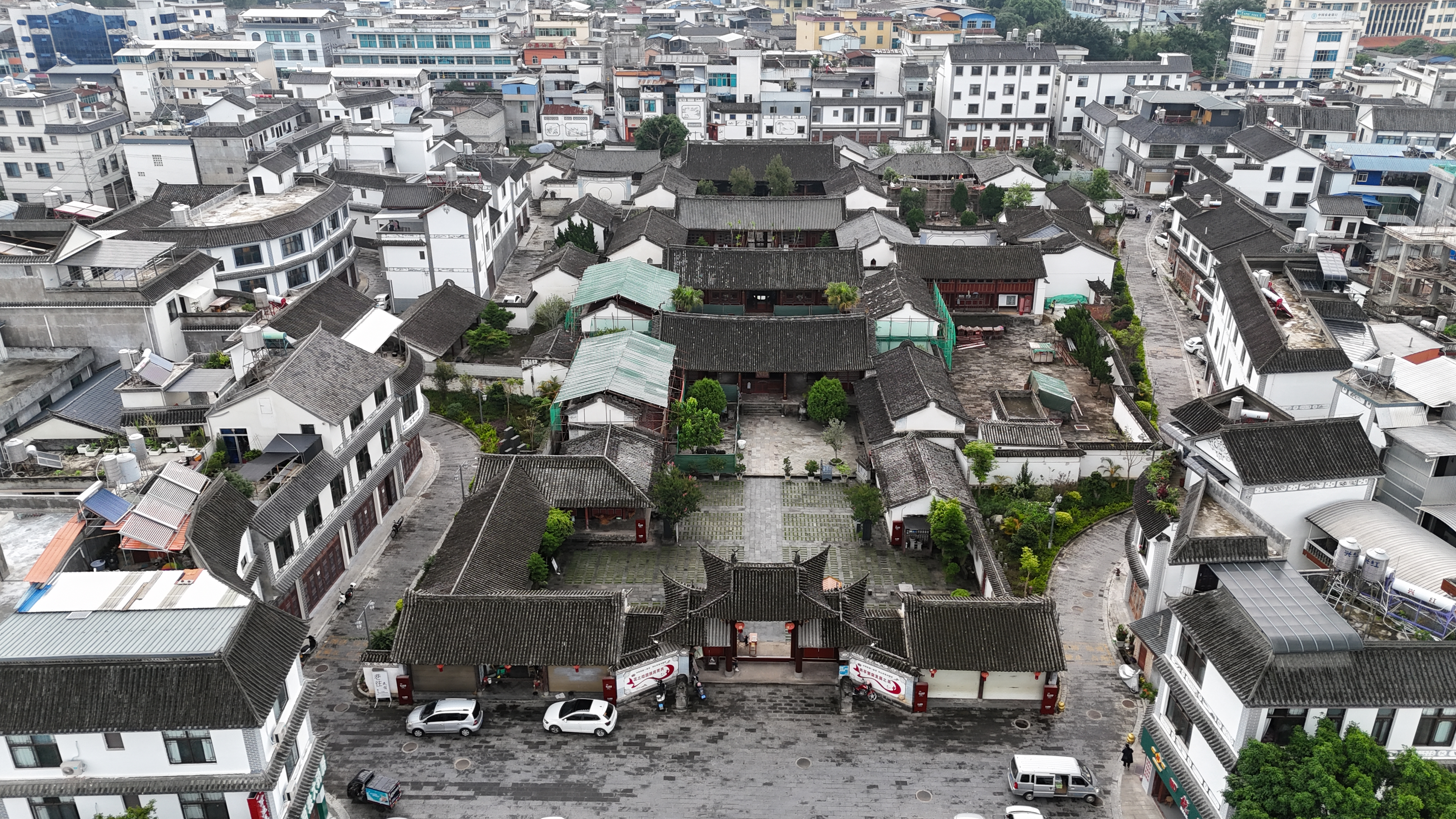
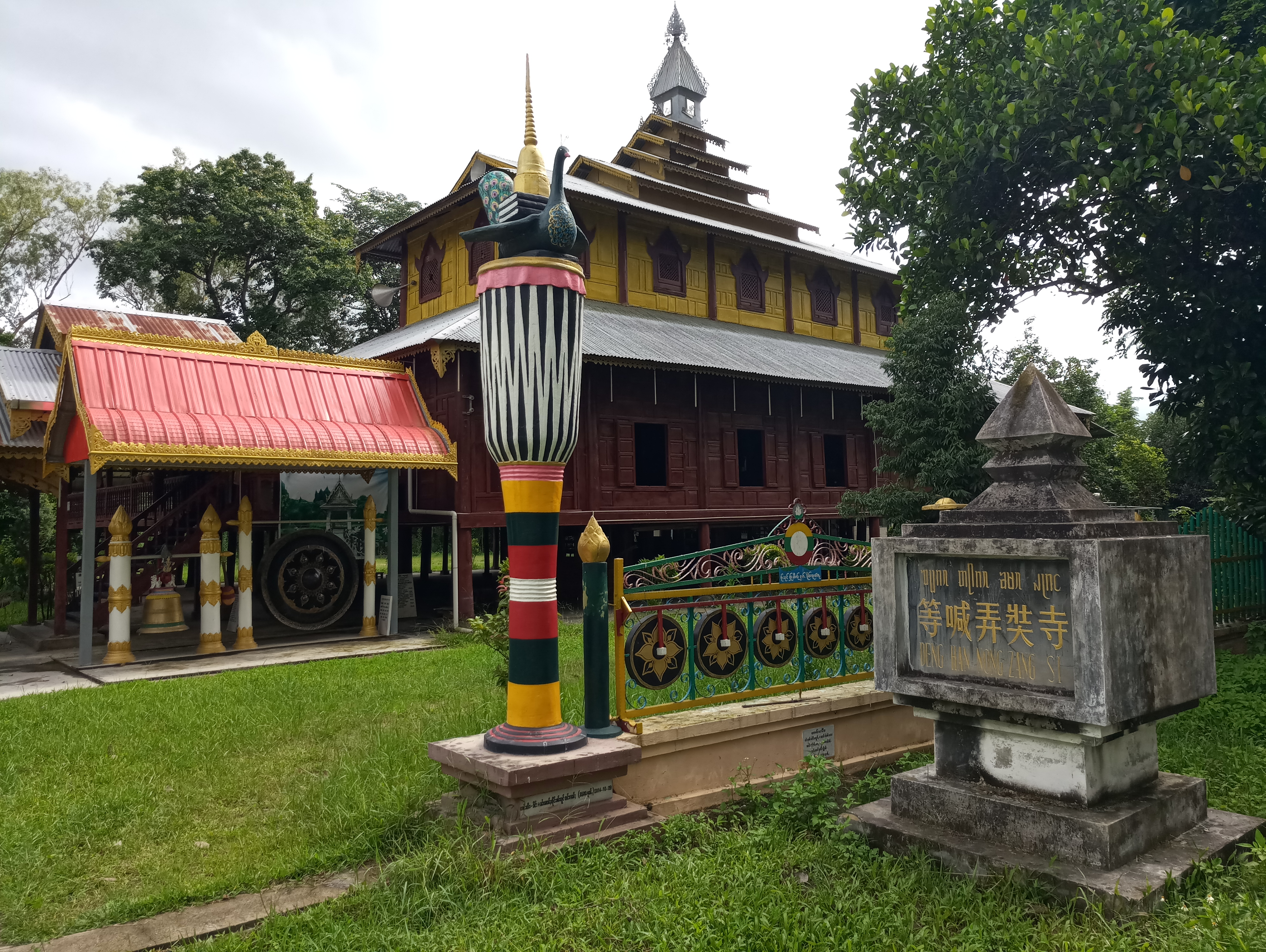
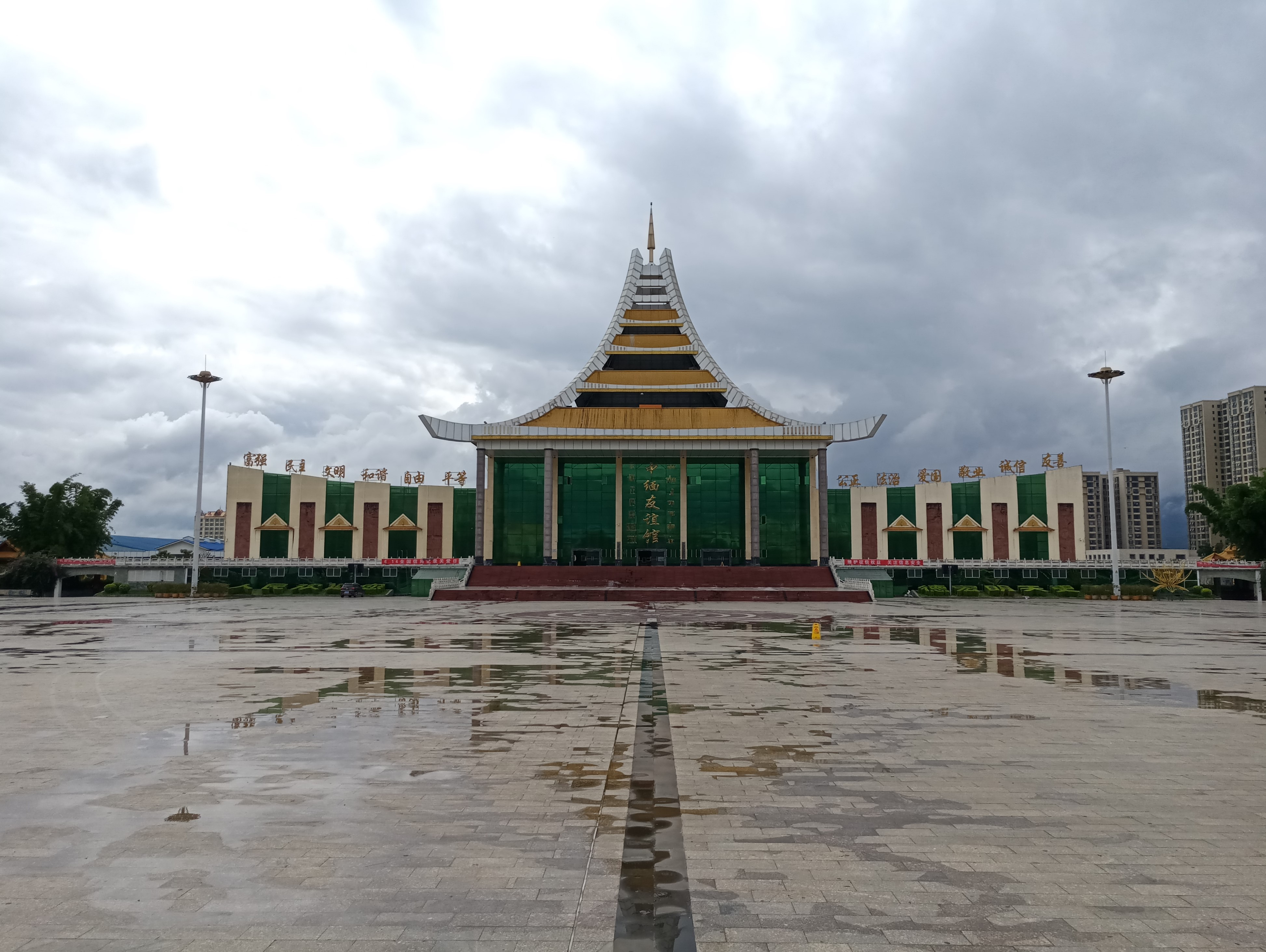
- Skyline of the capital Mangshi Border port of Ruili Vëeng Qĕhng Stupa Nandian Tusi Chiefdom office Kyaung of Tëng Xäm Lóong Mangshi Square
- Etymology: From Tai Nuea Taue Xoong (ᥖᥬᥲ ᥑᥨᥒᥰ), meaning "the lower reaches of the Nu River"
- Nickname: Home of the peafowls
- Dehong in Yunnan
- Coordinates (Dehong Prefecture government): 24°25′59″N 98°35′08″E
- Country: People's Republic of China
- Province: Yunnan
- Founded: 24 July 1953
- Seat: Mangshi
- Divisions: 2 cities and 3 counties: Mangshi City; Ruili City; Lianghe County; Yingjiang County; Longchuan County

Government
  - Prefecture governor: Wei Gang (卫岗)
  - Secretary of CCP Prefecture Committee: Wang Junqiang (王俊强)

Area
  - Total: 11,172.24 km^{2} (4,313.63 sq mi)
  - Rank: 16

Dimensions
  - Length: 170 km (110 mi)
  - Width: 122 km (76 mi)
- Elevation (Mangshi): 920 m (3,020 ft)
- Highest elevation (Daniang Mountain): 3,404.6 m (11,170 ft)
- Lowest elevation (Jieyang river valley): 210 m (690 ft)

Population (2020 census)
  - Total: 1,315,709
  - Estimate (2026): 1,354,000
  - Rank: 13
  - Density: 117.7659/km^{2} (305.0123/sq mi)
  - Rank: 9

Ethnic groups
  - Han Chinese: 704,000 – 52.24%
  - Dai: 368,100 – 28.45%
  - Jingpo: 141,200 – 10.91%
  - Lisu: 33,400 – 2.58%
  - Achang: 32,100 – 2.48%
  - Palaung (De'ang): 15,200 – 1.17%
  - Male: 624,774 – 51.57%
  - Female: 586,666 – 48.43%

GDP
  - Total: CN¥ 58.7 billion US$ 8.7 billion
  - Per capita: CN¥ 44,530; US$ 6,568
- Time zone: UTC+8
- Postal code: 678400
- Area code: (0)692
- ISO 3166 code: CN-YN-31
- Vehicle registration: 云N
- Website: www.dh.gov.cn

Dehong Dai and Jingpo Autonomous Prefecture

Chinese name
- Simplified Chinese: 德宏傣族景颇族自治州
- Traditional Chinese: 德宏傣族景頗族自治州
Transcriptions
Standard Mandarin
- Hanyu Pinyin: Déhóng Dǎizú Jǐngpōzú Zìzhìzhōu

Burmese name
- Burmese: တယ်ဟုန် ရှမ်း နှင့် ဂျိမ်းဖော ကိုယ်ပိုင်အုပ်ချုပ်ခွင့်ရ စီရင်စု

Tai Nuea name
- Tai Nuea: ᥟᥪᥒᥱ ᥙᥪᥴ ᥓᥝᥲ ᥙᥩᥒ ᥛᥥᥝᥰ ᥖᥭᥰ ᥓᥤᥒ ᥚᥨᥝᥲ ᥖᥬᥲ ᥑᥨᥒᥰ

Jingpo name
- Jingpo: Sakhkung Sam Jinghpo Amyu Madu Uphkang Mungd

Zaiwa name
- Zaiwa: Sikung Sam Zaizo Byumyu Yumsing Upkang Mau

The Dehong Dai and Jingpo Autonomous Prefecture (Note: Chinese: 德宏傣族景颇族自治州; pinyin: Déhóng Dǎizú Jǐngpōzú Zìzhìzhōu; Tai Nuea: ᥟᥪᥒᥱ ᥙᥪᥴ ᥓᥝᥲ ᥙᥩᥒ ᥛᥥᥝᥰ ᥖᥭᥰ ᥓᥤᥒ ᥚᥨᥲ ᥖᥬᥲ ᥑᥨᥒᥰ; Jingpo: Sakhkung Sam Jinghpo Amyu Madu Uphkang Mungdo; Burmese: တယ်ဟုန် ရှမ်း နှင့် ဂျိန်းဖော ကိုယ်ပိုင်အုပ်ချုပ်ခွင့်ရ) is an autonomous prefecture in western Yunnan province, China. It is bordered by Baoshan to the east and Myanmar's Kachin State to the west. Its eponymous ethnic minorities are the Dai and Jingpo, who make up 28 and 11 percent of the prefecture's population, respectively. By the end of 2024, the resident population of the whole state is 1,337,000, of which the urban population is 687,000.

== Etymology ==
Tai Nuea is the origin language of the word "Dehong", in Tai Le script (the script used to write the Tai Nüa language by the Tai Nua people) is written as "ᥖᥬᥳ ᥑᥨᥒᥰ", transliterated to Latin as Taue Xoong. Dehong means the lower reaches of the Nu River.

The Chinese characters for Dehong are "德宏". These two characters are a compound of 德, "moral" or "value"; and 宏, "magnificent" or "great".

== History ==
=== Early history ===
Dianyue and Ailao were the ancient countries recorded in Chinese literature in the Dehong area, and Guozhanbi (Kawsampi) was an ancient country established by the Dai people and recorded in Dai legends.

==== Dianyue ====
In the history book Records of the Grand Historian written by Sima Qian during the Han dynasty, a paragraph in volume 123 describes Dianyue as when Zhang Qian visited Daxia in Central Asia, he found some merchandise that was produced in Sichuan. And the Daxia merchant said it was purchased from Yuandu (India). There was a trade route, Shu-Yuandu Road (蜀身毒道), between Yuandu and Sichuan. The road passed a kingdom named "Dianyue" (滇越). The country is also called "Dianyue Chengxiang" (滇越乘象国) in modern books.Chinese historians generally said Tengyue was the center of Dianyue Chengxiang, and the territory included the Dehong area. However, some historians disagree with this opinion. Lou Zichang believes Dianyue Chengxiang was not a country in western Yunnan, nor was it a country established by the Dai people.

==== Ailao ====
Ai Lao (哀牢) was an ancient tribal alliance country in the west of Yunnan from the Spring and Autumn to the Eastern Han periods, and modern historians say the area included Dehong. In Chronicles of Huayang, the record of Ailao mentions its territory "3,000 li from west to east, and 4,600 li from south to north", approximately equal to 1,300 km west to east and 1,994 km south to north in modern units. It includes the southwest of Yunnan and most of Myanmar, and in modern research, it is called the generalized area of Ailao.

In the Han period, Ailao was an influential tribal country with a population of 20,000. Baoshan historian Xiao Zhengwei believes the kingdom of Dianyue was a powerful tribe under Ailao.

In 69 AD, Liu Mao (柳貌), the king of Ailao, led the tribal alliance to surrender to the Han dynasty, and Han set "Ailao County" here. During the Southern dynasty Qi period, the name was changed to "Xicheng County" (西城县). During the end of the Liang dynasty, Xicheng County was abolished.

==== Guozhanbi ====
Between 568 BC and 424 BC, during the Eastern Zhou dynasty in China, the ancestors of the Dai people had settled in the Shweli River valley area and entered the tribal period. In 364 BC, grand chief Gelaba (葛拉叭) unified the tribes in the Shweli basin. He became the chief of the tribal alliance and set the capital at Hansa (喊萨, in modern Ruili). It was the early stage of the "Guozhanbi"(果占璧) Kingdom, also called "Kawsampi" (憍赏弥).

In 364 AD, a descendant of Gelaba named Zhaowuding (召武定) inherited the throne. He became a famous deity, sovereign, and culture hero of the Dai people. In the 7th century, the Dai area was in chaos, and the descendants of Zhaowuding could not effectively control the area. At the same time, the kingdom of Nanzhao was rising and conquered the Dehong area. Piluoge, the king of Nanzhao, canonized another Dai tribe chief named Hundeng (混等) to be the "King of Mong Mao" and managed the whole Dai area in 762.

In 1995, Dehong historian Yang Yongsheng published research on the ancient Dai civilization. He put forward a new opinion during the Dai legend research — The "Kingdom of Daguang" (达光) is the first country of the Dai people which was established in 424 BC, and the country "Dianyue Chengxiang" is another name for "Daguang". In 233 BC, the capital of Daguang moved to Pagan, and finally perished in 586 AD. The research was countered by He Ping, a history professor at Yunnan University. He Ping says that the Kingdom of Daguang is the legendary kingdom of Tagaung in Burmese history and there was no kingdom of "Daguang" in the ancient Dai civilization. The Dai legend of Daguang is the story of pre-period of the Pyu city-states. The story of the Pyu city-states spread to the Dehong Dai area, localized to a Dai legend, and was recorded in Dai literature.

In Yang Yongsheng's research, the kingdom of "Guozhanbi" was the second kingdom established by the Dai people after Daguang. Dai language literatures were his sources of research. He said the kingdom of Guozhanbi was in existence from 567 to 1488. According to the research of He Ping, "Guozhanbi" is the ancient state "Kawsampi" or Kosambi. There are many legends about Kawsampi in Thai-Shan folklore. The origin of the legend was a story in Buddhist texts. Therefore, He Ping thought the Kingdom of "Guozhanbi" or "Kawsampi" is an untrustworthy history.

=== Medieval ===
Whether or not the early history of Dehong is controversial, it can be determined that Dehong belonged to Nanzhao and Dali in the medieval period of Yunnan. In Nanzhao, it was divided into "Yongchang Jiedu" (永昌节度, south of Dehong) and "Lishui Jiedu" (丽水节度, north of Dehong). In Dali, it was under the division of "Zhenxi Zhen" (镇西镇).

In 1253, Kublai Khan conquered the Dali Kingdom, and the Dehong Dai people capitulated to the Mongol Empire. The Mongols set up an administrative division called "Jinchi Anfu Si" (金齿安抚司) to manage the west of Yunnan. In 1276, during the Yuan dynasty, the Anfu Si was upgraded to "Jinchi Xuanfu Si" (金齿宣抚司), and established the agency "6 Lu governor Fu" (六路总管府) to manage the Dehong area. The 6 Lu were: Luchuan Lu (麓川路, modern Ruili and Longchuan), Pingmian Lu (平缅路, modern southern Lianghe and northern Longchuan), Zhenxi Lu (镇西路, modern Yingjiang), Zhenkang Lu (镇康路, modern Zhenkang, out of Dehong), Mangshi Lu (茫施路, modern Mangshi), and Rouyuan Lu (柔远路, modern Lujiang, out of Dehong). In addition, the special divisions named "Nan Dan" (南赕) and Nandian Fu (南甸府, modern Lianghe) were established. The scope of "6 Lu general manager Fu" was close to the modern Dehong territory.

In 1277, Narathihapate, the king of the Burmese Pagan Kingdom, invaded the modern Dehong area. The Battle of Ngasaunggyan occurred on the bank of the Taping River, presently in Yingjiang County. The Yuan army only had 700 soldiers but eventually repelled the Burmese military of 40,000 to 50,000 soldiers with 10,000 horses and 800 elephants. It was the prelude to the First Mongol invasion of Burma.

During the 13th and 14th centuries, the Dehong Dai people immigrated to modern Assam in India and built up the kingdom of Ahom. They formed the latter-day Ahom people.

=== Möng Mao ===
The territory of Möng Mao in the heyday of the Si Kefa period

The local Dai chief was the leader of Luchuan Lu, and they were the successors of "Guozhanbi". "Luchuan" is the name denoted by Yuan, and "Möng Mao" is a self-claimed name.

Si Kefa enthroned the chieftain of Luchuan Lu in 1340 and sent troops to the surrounding states such Hsenwi, Möng Yang, and Möng Mit. After that, he attacked Mangshi, Zhenxi, Pingmian, and Nandian. The Yuan dynasty initiated wars in 1342, 1345, 1346, and 1347 to counterattack Luchuan, but all the attempts failed. Luchuan conquered the surrounding states successively. In 1355, Si Kefa asked the Yuan dynasty to canonize him. The Yuan central government admitted his local regime and canonized Si Kefa to be the first Möng Mao Tusi. The central government set a division of "Pingmian Xuanwei Si" (平缅宣慰司) at Möng Mao to legalize the regime, and Möng Mao Tusi was the leader of Xuanwei Si.

In 1382, the Ming dynasty military arrived at the Möng Mao Tusi and Si Lunfa surrendered. Ming granted him the title "Xuanwei Commissioner of Luchuan Pingmian" (麓川平缅宣慰使) and changed the division name "Luchuan Pingmian Xuanwei Si". In 1385, the leader of Jingdong renegaded the Möng Mao regime, and Si Lunfa sent troops to attack Jingdong. However, Mu Ying, the general of Yunnan, was protecting the Jingdong leader.

The wars between the Möng Mao regime and the Yunnan local government occurred in 1387 and 1388. Finally, Möng Mao failed. In order to maintain the relationship with Ming, Si Lunfa sent a mission to Kunming to make peace. Möng Mao consented to compensate for the losses, and peace was restored.

After Si Lunfa died in 1399, a minister of Möng Mao launched a rebellion. The Ming government felt threatened and separated 14 Tusi regions from the Luchuan territory. During Si Xingfa's rule in the 1410s, the Möng Mao territory decreased to include only modern Ruili, Mangshi, and Namhkam.

After Si Xingfa, Si Renfa was enthroned in 1413, and he tried to restore the kingdom to its former glory. In 1439, a conflict between Möng Mao and Ming reoccurred. This was the beginning of the Luchuan–Pingmian campaigns. In 1441, Ming sent troops to Möng Mao, and Si Renfa fled to Möng Yang. Several wars occurred between 1443 and 1449, and finally, Möng Mao lost Dehong. The imperial family continued to live in Möng Yang until they were attacked in 1604 by the Toungoo dynasty.

=== Ming and Qing dynasties ===
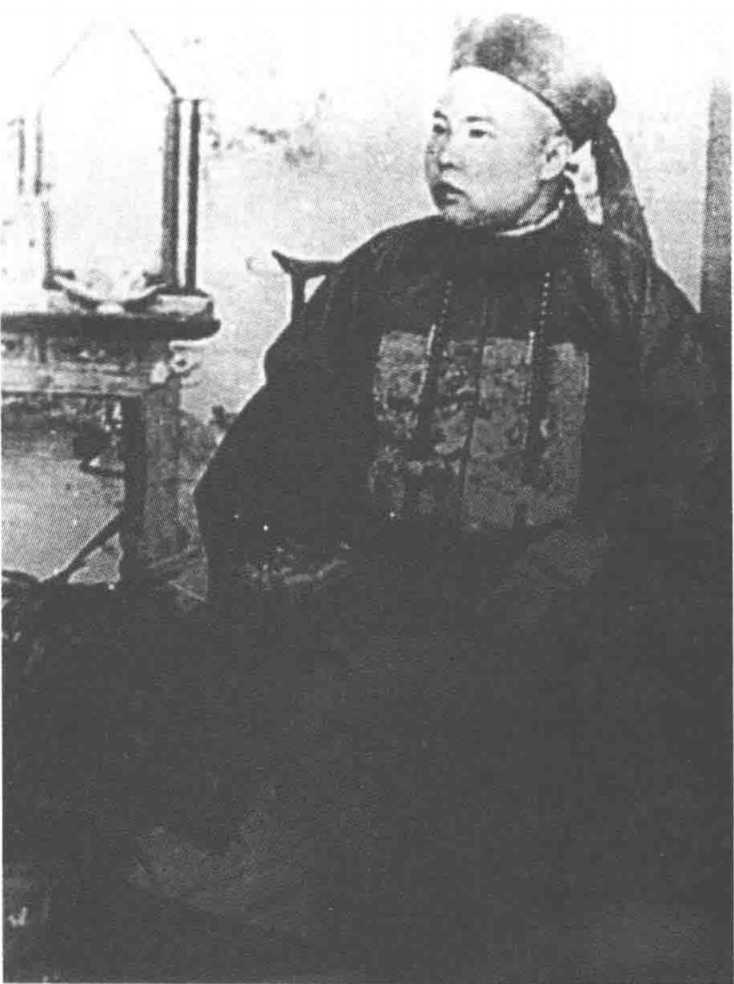
Fang Zhengde (放正德), the 21st Mangshih Tusi

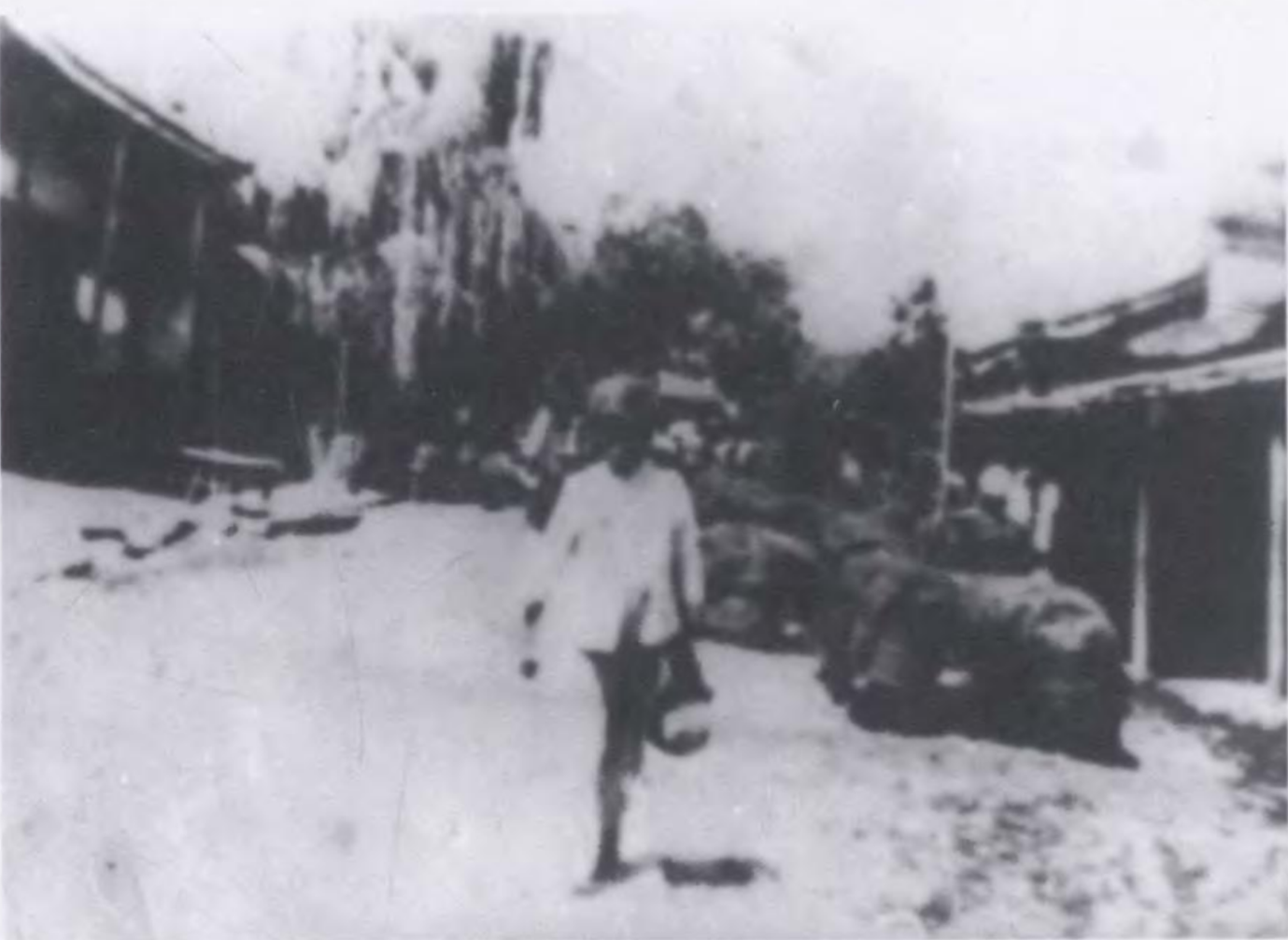
Manyun Customs

After the Mong Mao kingdom declined, the Chinese central government gained efficient control in the Dehong area. During the Ming and Qing dynasties, the central government canonized 10 Tusi in Dehong:

Tusi	established	title	family name	modern
Mong Mao	1604	Mongmao Anfu Si 勐卯安抚司	Kan (衎)	Ruili
Longchuan	1444	Longchuan Xuanfu Si 陇川宣抚司	Duo (多)	Longchuan
Nandian	1444	Nandian Xuanfu Si 南甸宣抚司	Dao (刀); Gong (龚)	Lianghe
Ganya	1403	Ganya Zhangguan Si 干崖长官司 (1403-1444); Ganya Xuanfu Si 干崖宣抚司 (1444-1955)	Dao (刀)	Yingjiang
Mangshih	1443	Mangshi Yuyi Zhangguan Si 芒市御夷长官司 (1443-1640); Mangshi Anfu Si 芒市安抚司 (1640-1950)	Fang (放→方)	Mangshi
Zhanda	Chongzhen period	Zhanda Vice Xuanfu Si 盏达副宣抚司	Si (思)	Yingjiang
Zhefang	1584	Zhefang Vice Xuanfu Si 遮放副宣抚司	Duo (多)	Mangshi
Husa	1770	Husa Zhangguan Si 户撒长官司	Lai (赖)	Longchuan
Lasa	1653	Lasa Zhangguan Si 腊撒长官司	Gai (盖)	Longchuan
Mengban	1899	Mengban Tu Qianzong 勐板土千总	Jiang (蒋)	Mangshi

China–Myanmar border Dehong section, the solid line is the modern borderline, and the dotted lines are the outline of the areas which were incorporated into Burma in 1897. The red region is the "Namwan Assigned Tract".

During the Ming dynasty, two Sino-Burmese wars occurred in Dehong. In 1594, Yunnan grand coordinator Chen Yongbin (陈用宾) built up 8 border defense military checkpoints to guard the international border between Dehong and the Burmese Toungoo dynasty; these checkpoints formed the early border between China and Myanmar.

In 1658, the last emperor of the Southern Ming dynasty, Zhu Youlang, passed the Nandian and Ganya Tusi and fled to Myanmar. He granted Ganya Tusi a marquess title. Ganya Tusi helped Youlang to flee but was completely annihilated in the tussle. Thereafter, all the Tusi in Dehong surrendered to the Qing dynasty in 1659. The war between the Qing and Konbaung dynasties from 1765 to 1769 also extended to the Dehong area.

In 1875, a British translator, Augustus Raymond Margary, and his four personal staff members were murdered in the west of Yingjiang County. This was an important non-governmental crisis in Sino-British relations and came to be known as the "Margary Affair". This event was followed by the signing of the Yantai Treaty.

In 1894, during a Britain-China border convention, (Note: The convention in the English language named Convention between China and Great Britain giving effect to Article III of the Convention of 24 July 1886 relative to Burmah and Thibet, and in the Chinese language named 《续议滇缅界、商务条款》) certain sections of the China–Myanmar border to the south of the "High Conical Peak" (尖高山) were delimited, and an agreement was reached that the Qing dynasty would open two border ports between Burma and China: Manyun (蛮允) and Zhanxi (盏西).

In 1897, another agreement was signed (Note: The agreement in the English language was called the Agreement between China and Great Britain Modifying the Convention of 1 March 1894 relative to Burmah and Thibet, and in the Chinese language it was called 《续议缅甸条约附款》) and three parts of the area around Dehong were incorporated into Burma, although the convention in 1894 had determined they were part of China, and four of the border checkpoints which were established by Chen Yongbin in the Ming dynasty were also incorporated into Burma. Under this agreement, the British government leased the "Namwan Assigned Tract" in the southwest of Dehong with the rent of 1,000 Rupees a year. Finally, China didn't get this region back and used it to exchange another area in the west of Cangyuan in 1960.

=== After the Qing dynasty ===
After the Wuchang Uprising occurred in October 1911, Ganya Tusi Dao Anren (刀安仁) launched an uprising at Tengyue on 27 October 1911. Under the Republic of China, the Yunnan government tried to eliminate the Tusi system and replace Tusi with state-appointed officials, but the Tusi officials opposed the change. Therefore, special administrative divisions were formed to support the period of transition. The administrative titles included Suppress Committee (弹压委员) and Deputy County (县佐) between 1911 and 1917, District and Deputy County between 1917 and 1932, and Administrative Bureau (设治局) after 1932.

The Tusi system existed until the land reform movement in 1955. The administrative bureaus after 1932 included Luxi, Ruili, Longchuan, Yingjiang, Lianshan, and Lianghe — they were the predecessors of future counties.

During World War II, Dehong was an important strategic location for China. By 1938, the Burma Road was built, and it was an important international transit channel after the Japanese army blocked the eastern coast of China. In 1939, the Central Aircraft Manufacturing Company moved to Loiwing in the south-west corner of Ruili, and it was the biggest aircraft manufacturing plant in China at that time.

=== After World War II ===
The area was declared an autonomous region in 1953. In May 1956, it became an autonomous prefecture. In 1960, when inter-provincial migration took place, many farmers came to Yunnan to farm bananas. This was during the "Great Leap Forward" when a biologist working for Mao Zedong wrote an article about the weather in Yunnan being very suitable for bananas to be planted. Before this, many Chinese were scared of going there because of an illness that lurked about. It was later discovered that this was an identifiable tropical disease. The farmers helped to get rid of the disease. They made clearings, roads, and space for fields and plantations.

=== Demographics ===
Among the resident population, the Han population is 713,590, accounting for 54.23% of the total population; the ethnic minorities population is 602,119, accounting for 45.77% of the total population.

Most of the Dai people in Dehong Prefecture and nearby counties and cities belong to Tai Nua and speak Tai Nua Language.

Ethnic Composition of Dehong Dai and Jingpo Autonomous Prefecture
National name		Han	Dai	Jingpo	Lisu	Achang	De'ang	Bai	Yi	Hui	Wa	Others	Total
2010	Population	629,147	349,840	134,373	31,530	30,389	14,436	7,754	4,177	2,800	1,203	5,791	1,211,440
2010	Proportion of total population (%)	51.93	28.88	11.09	2.60	2.51	1.19	0.64	0.34	0.23	0.10	0.48	100
2020	Population	713,590	357,306	133,936	34,121	30,961	14,310	9,179	7,565	3,447		11,446	1315709
2020	Proportion of total population (%)	54.23	27.16	10.18	2.59	2.35	1.09	0.7	0.57	0.26		0.87	100

== Geography ==
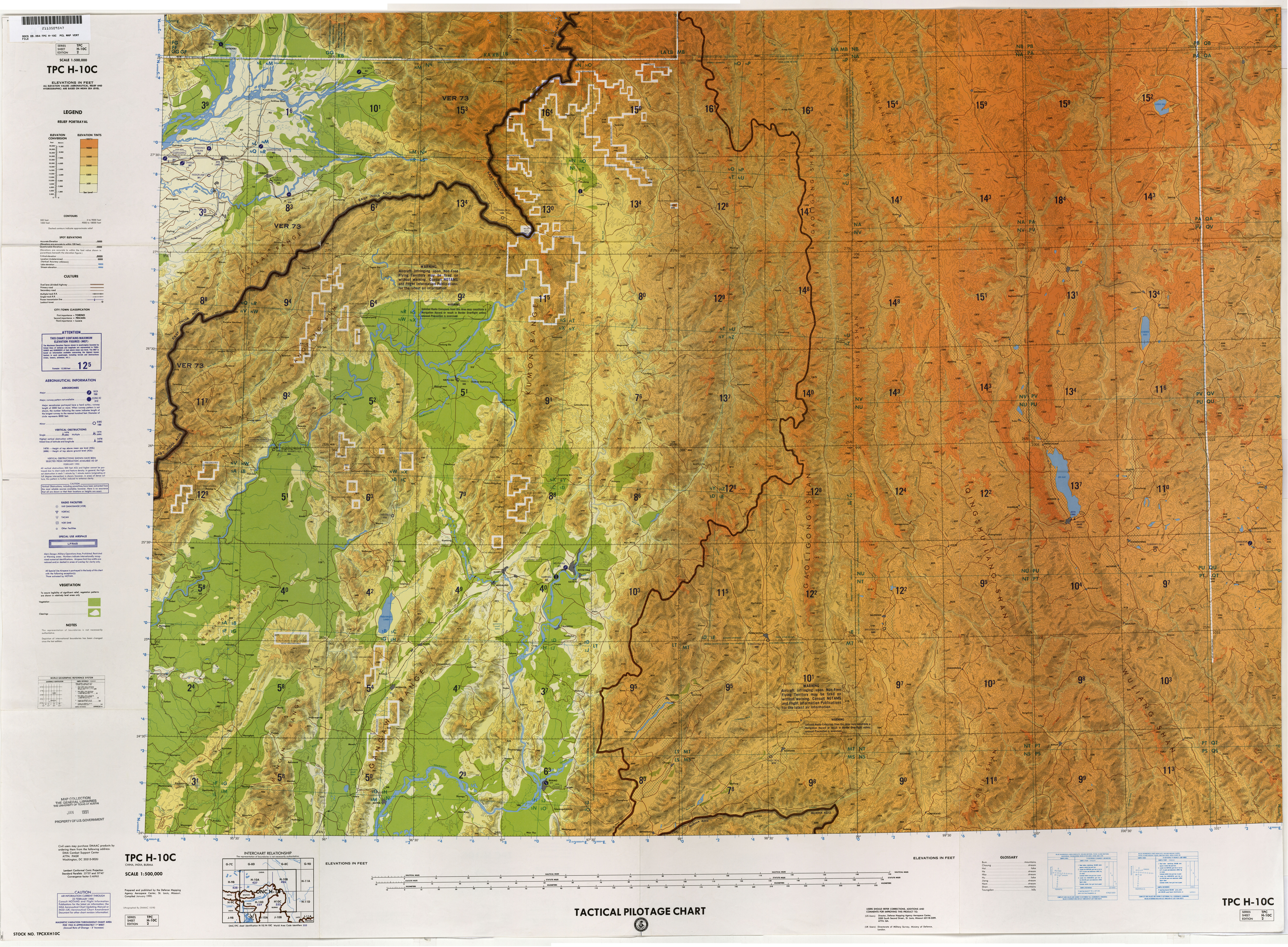
Map including the Dehong Dai and Jingpo Autonomous Prefecture area

Dehong extends 122 km (76 mi) from east to west and 170 km (110 mi) from north to south, and its area is 11,526 km^{2} (4,450 sq mi).

=== Climate ===
Climate data for Mangshi (1981−2010)
Month	Jan	Feb	Mar	Apr	May	Jun	Jul	Aug	Sep	Oct	Nov	Dec	Year
Record high °C (°F)	27.0 (80.6)	31.0 (87.8)	33.4 (92.1)	35.2 (95.4)	35.6 (96.1)	34.9 (94.8)	34.4 (93.9)	35.3 (95.5)	35.0 (95.0)	33.4 (92.1)	29.7 (85.5)	27.4 (81.3)	35.6 (96.1)
Mean daily maximum °C (°F)	22.1 (71.8)	23.9 (75.0)	27.3 (81.1)	29.5 (85.1)	29.5 (85.1)	28.7 (83.7)	28.0 (82.4)	29.0 (84.2)	29.1 (84.4)	27.8 (82.0)	25.0 (77.0)	22.4 (72.3)	26.9 (80.3)
Daily mean °C (°F)	12.6 (54.7)	14.5 (58.1)	17.9 (64.2)	21.1 (70.0)	23.3 (73.9)	24.2 (75.6)	23.9 (75.0)	24.2 (75.6)	23.5 (74.3)	21.5 (70.7)	17.3 (63.1)	13.7 (56.7)	19.8 (67.7)
Mean daily minimum °C (°F)	6.1 (43.0)	7.7 (45.9)	10.7 (51.3)	14.7 (58.5)	18.7 (65.7)	21.4 (70.5)	21.5 (70.7)	21.5 (70.7)	20.4 (68.7)	17.8 (64.0)	12.5 (54.5)	8.1 (46.6)	15.1 (59.2)
Record low °C (°F)	−0.2 (31.6)	1.5 (34.7)	3.6 (38.5)	7.5 (45.5)	13.2 (55.8)	16.8 (62.2)	15.9 (60.6)	17.6 (63.7)	14.5 (58.1)	9.3 (48.7)	5.5 (41.9)	1.0 (33.8)	−0.2 (31.6)
Average precipitation mm (inches)	13.7 (0.54)	26.6 (1.05)	26.9 (1.06)	65.4 (2.57)	154.3 (6.07)	287.5 (11.32)	360.1 (14.18)	317.7 (12.51)	187.0 (7.36)	137.9 (5.43)	49.8 (1.96)	11.8 (0.46)	1,638.7 (64.51)
Average relative humidity (%)	78	72	66	67	75	84	87	86	84	83	82	81	79
Source: China Meteorological Data Service Center

== Administration ==
Dehong is divided into three counties and two county level cities:

Map
Name	Hanzi	Hanyu Pinyin	Tai Nuea	Jingpo	Seat
Mangshi City	芒市	Máng Shì	ᥝᥥᥒᥰ ᥛᥫᥒᥰ ᥑᥩᥢᥴ	Mangshi Myu	Menghuan Subdistrict
Ruili City	瑞丽市	Ruìlì Shì	ᥝᥥᥒᥰ ᥛᥫᥒᥰ ᥛᥣᥝᥰ	Shuili Myu	Mengmao Subdistrict
Lianghe County	梁河县	Liánghé Xiàn	ᥔᥦᥢᥱ ᥛᥫᥒᥰ ᥖᥤᥰ	Lengho Ginwang	Zhedao Town
Yingjiang County	盈江县	Yíngjiāng Xiàn	ᥔᥦᥢᥱ ᥛᥫᥒᥰ ᥘᥣᥲ	Yinkyang Ginwang	Pingyuan Town
Longchuan County	陇川县	Lǒngchuān Xiàn	ᥔᥦᥢᥱ ᥛᥫᥒᥰ ᥝᥢᥰ	Nshon Ginwang	Zhangfeng Town

The prefectural government seat is Mangshi.

== Economy ==
Dehong is one of the 3 primary regions for coffee cultivation in Yunnan. The main coffee planter and processor is Hogood Coffee, which operates a contracting scheme with local farmers. Hogood contracts farm land from smallholders on which it plants seedlings, and then re-contracts with farmers to purchase the coffee beans at harvest.
