= Lashi language =

Sino-Tibetan language spoken in Burma and China

Lashi
- လရှီ / လချစ် Lacid
- Native to: Myanmar, China
- Ethnicity: Lachik
- Native speakers: (30,000 cited 2000)
- Language family: Sino-Tibetan: (Tibeto-Burman); Lolo–Burmese; Burmish; Maruic; Lashi

Language codes
- ISO 639-3: lsi (incl. Chashan)
- Glottolog: lash1243

Lashi (Burmese: လရှီ, endonym Lacid) is a Burmish language. Although the endonym Lashi is often used by Western researchers, the people refer to themselves and their language as Lacid. It is according to Nishi in the Maruic branch, which preserves the preglottalized initials of Proto-Burmish in the most phonotactic environments.

== Distribution ==
There are conflicting reports about the size of the Lashi population. Reports range from 30,000 to 60,000. In China, Lashi (Leqi) speakers are distributed in Mangshi City (formerly Luxi County), Ruili City, Longchuan County, and Yingjiang County of western Yunnan Province (Dai 2007:5). Mangshi has the most Lashi speakers, who are distributed in the following townships.

- Manghai (မန်ဟိုင်, 芒海镇)
- Zhongshan (ကျုင်းရှန်မြို့ , 中山乡)
- Dongshan (သုင်ရှန်မြို့ , 东山乡)
- Santai (ဆန်ထိုင်မြို့ , 三台乡, in Gonglin ကုင်လင် 拱岭寨 and Manggang မန်ကန်芒岗寨 villages)

Lashi (လရှီ) is also spoken in eastern Shan State, Burma. Lashi was originally spoken in the downstream area of the Ngochang Hka river valley, a tributary of the N’Mai Hka river, while Ngochang was originally spoken in the upstream area of the Ngochang Hka river valley.

The Chashan language, which is closely related to Lashi, is spoken in nearby Pianma Township (片马镇), Lushui County.
