= Pela language =

Burmish language of Western Yunnan, China

Pela
- Bola
- Pronunciation: Pela pronunciation: [pə˧˩la˥]
- Native to: China
- Ethnicity: 1,000 (2001)
- Native speakers: (400 cited 2000)
- Language family: Sino-Tibetan: Tibeto-Burman; Lolo–Burmese; Burmish; Maruic; Pela

Language codes
- ISO 639-3: bxd
- Glottolog: pela1242
- ELP: Pela
- Bola is classified as Definitely Endangered by the UNESCO Atlas of the World's Languages in Danger.

Pela or Bola (Chinese: 波拉; autonym: pə³¹la⁵⁵, exonym: po³¹no⁵¹) is a Burmish language of Western Yunnan, China. In China, Pela speakers are classified as part of the Jingpo ethnic group. Pela may also be spoken in Burma.

== Distribution ==
There are about 500 speakers as of 2005. The ethnic population is distributed as follows.

- Mangshi
  - Santaishan (三台山乡)
    - Yinqian (引欠村)
    - Kongjiazhai (孔家寨, representative dialect; Pela: tsɛ³¹kʰauŋ³⁵tam³¹)
  - Wuchalu (五岔路乡)
    - Mengguang (勐广村)
    - Nongnong (弄弄村)
    - Gongqiu (贡丘)
  - Xishan (西山乡)
    - 2nd cluster (二组), Banzai (板栽)
  - Chengjiao (城郊)
    - Huashulin (桦树林)
- Lianghe County
  - Bangwai (邦外)
- Longchuan County
  - Shuangwopu (双窝铺)
  - Wangzishu (王子树)
  - Palangnong (帕浪弄)

Yinqian (引欠, or Yunqian 允欠) and Mengguang (勐广) have the largest Pela populations.
