= Jingpo language =

Tibeto-Burman language of the Sal branch

Jinghpaw
- Kachin
- Jinghpaw ga ဂျိန်ဖော့
- Pronunciation: [tɕiŋ˧˩pʰɔʔ˧˩]
- Native to: Myanmar, China, India
- Region: Kachin State, Yingjiang County
- Ethnicity: Jinghpaw
- Native speakers: (c. 940,000 cited 1999–2001)
- Language family: Sino-Tibetan: Tibeto-Burman; Sal; Jingpho–Luish; Jinghpaw
- Dialects: Singpho; Dzili (Jili)
- Writing system: Latin alphabet Mon–Burmese script (unofficial)

Official status
- Recognised minority language in: China; Myanmar

Language codes
- ISO 639-2: kac
- ISO 639-3: Variously: kac – Jinghpaw sgp – Singpho tcl – Taman
- Glottolog: jing1260

A documentary about Kachin culture in Myanmar recorded in Jingpo

Jinghpaw (Kachin: Jinghpaw ga, Jìngphòʔ gà, ဈိာင်ဖေါစ်) or Kachin (Burmese: ကချင်ဘာသာ, [kətɕɪ̀ɰ̃ bàðà]) is a Tibeto-Burman language of the Sal branch spoken primarily in Kachin State, Myanmar; Northeast India; and Yunnan, China. The Jinghpaw (or Kachin) peoples, a confederation of several ethnic groups who live in the Kachin Hills, are the primary speakers of Jinghpaw language, numbering approximately 625,000 speakers. The term "Kachin language" may refer to the Jinghpaw language or any of the other languages spoken by the Jinghpaw peoples, such as Lisu, Lashi, Rawang, Zaiwa, Lhawo Vo, and Achang. These languages are from distinct branches of the highest level of the Tibeto-Burman family.

Jinghpaw is written using a modified Latin alphabet; a Burmese alphabet is used by some speakers, but it has largely been phased out. Jinghpaw syllable finals can consist of vowels, nasals, or oral stops.

The Turung of Assam in India speak a Jingpo dialect with many Assamese loanwords, called Singpho, which shares 50% lexical similarity with Jinghpaw.

== Dialects ==
There are at least 16 Jingpoish (Kachinic) varieties (Kurabe 2014:59). The demographic and location information listed below is drawn from Kurabe (2014). Standard Jingpo and Nkhum are the best described varieties, whereas the Jingpoish varieties of India have been recently documented by Stephen Morey. Jingpoish varieties in northern Kachin State remain little described.

The Ethnologue lists Duleng (Dalaung, Dulong), Dzili (Jili), Hkaku (Hka-Hku), and Kauri (Gauri, Guari, Hkauri). According to the Ethnologue, Dzili might be a separate language, whereas Hkaku and Kauri are only slightly different.

Other underdescribed Jingpoish varieties include Mungji and Zawbung. Shanke is a recently described language closely related to Jingpo, although its speakers identify themselves as Naga.

=== Southern ===
- Standard Jinghpaw is the standard variety of Jinghpaw as used among the Kachin people in Myanmar, as well as by non-Kachin ethnic minorities in Kachin State. Most speakers live in Kachin State, though some live in Shan State and Sagaing Division. It is spoken primarily in Myitkyina, Bhamo, and Kutkai. Younger generations tend to pronounce /ts/ and /dz/ as [s] and [z], contrasting them with /s/ ([sʰ]). Standard Jinghpaw as spoken in Shan State often has ʔə- added to monosyllabic words, and also places the interrogative particle ʔi before verbs.
- Nkhum / Enkun 恩昆 (n̩˧˩kʰum˧ ka˧˩) is spoken in Lianghe, Ruili, Longchuan, and Luxi counties of Yunnan, China. It is the most widely spoken Jingpo dialect in China. The Nkhum dialect displays tense-lax register contrast, whereas Shadan does not. Although the Shadan dialect frequently has -ŋ, Nkhum often does not. The Tongbiguan 铜壁关 variety of Nkhum is used as the Jingpo standard variety in China. Small pockets of speakers are also found in Gengma County.
- Shadan / Shidan 石丹 (ʃă˩tan˧˩ ka˧˩; ʃă˩tam˧˩ ka˧˩) is spoken in Yunnan, China. It is spoken in the townships of Kachang 卡昌 and Taiping 太平 (in Getong 格同 of Mengzhi 蒙支, Zhengtonghong 正通硔, and Longpen 龙盆), located in Yingjiang County 盈江县.
- Gauri / Khauri (kau˧ʒi˧˩ ka˧˩) is spoken in the Gauri Hills, located to the east of Bhamo. Villages include Prang Hkudung, Man Dau, Hkarawm Kawng, Manda, Ka Daw, Lamai Bang, Bum Wa, Ma Htang, Jahkai, and Loi Ming. In China, Gauri is spoken by about 300 people in Hedao 贺岛 and Hongka 硔卡 villages of Longchuan County, and in Kachang 卡场镇 of Yingjiang County.
- Mengzhi 蒙支 (muŋ˧˩tʃi˧˩ ka˧˩) is spoken by about 200 people in the two villages of Getong 格同 and Zhengtongyou 正通猶 in Mengzhi 蒙支, Yingjiang County 盈江县.
- Thingnai is spoken near Mohnyin, southern Kachin State.

Small pockets of Jingpo speakers are also scattered across Gengma County 耿马县, including the following villages (Dai Qingxia 2010). Dai (2010) also includes 1,000-word vocabulary lists of the Yingjiang 盈江, Xinzhai 新寨, and Caoba 草坝 dialects.

- Jingpo Xinzhai 景颇新寨, Mangkang Village 芒抗村, Hepai Township 贺派乡
- Nalong 那拢组, Nongba Village 弄巴村, Gengma Town 耿马镇
- Hewen 贺稳组, Jingxin Village 景信村, Mengding Town 孟定镇
- Hebianzhai 河边寨, Qiushan Village 邱山村, Mengding Town 孟定镇
- Caobazhai 草坝寨, Mang'ai Village 芒艾村, Mengding Town 孟定镇

=== Northeastern ===
- Dingga: a recently discovered Jingpo variety spoken near Putao, Kachin State, in the villages of Ding Ga, Ding Ga Gabrim, Tsa Gung Ga, Layang Ga, Dai Mare, and Mărawt Ga. These villages are all located between the Shang Hka and Da Hka rivers in northern Kachin State. There are between 2,000 and 3,000 speakers.
- Duleng (tu˧˩leŋ˧) is spoken near Putao, in Machanbaw, and in the Nam Tisang valley of Kachin State. The only published description is that of Yue (2006).
- Dingphan is spoken near Putao, Kachin State.
- Jilí / Dzili
- Khakhu is spoken near Putao, Kachin State.
- Shang is spoken near Putao, Kachin State.
- Tsasen is spoken in northwestern Kachin State.

=== Northwestern ===
Singpho (Northwestern Jingpoish) varieties of Assam and Arunachal Pradesh, India include the following.

- Diyun is spoken in India.
- Numphuk is spoken by about 2,000 speakers in 20 villages, including Ingthong, Ketetong, Inthem, Kumsai, Bisa, Wagun 1, Wagun 2, Wagun 3, Wakhet Na, Kherem Bisa, Guju, and Giding. These villages are situated along the Burhi Dihing river in Assam, which is called the Numhpuk Hka river in Numphuk.
- Tieng is spoken in India.
- Turung is spoken by about 1,200 speakers mainly in the Titabor area (in the 3 villages of Pathargaon (Na Kthong), Tipomia, and Pahukatia) and the Dhonsiri river valley (in the villages of Balipathar, Rengmai, and Basapathar). There are many Tai loanwords in Turung. Some Turung speakers also self-identify as ethnic Tai.

=== Internal classification ===
Kurabe (2014) classifies seven Jingpoish dialects as follows.

- Proto-Jingpo
  - Southern
    - Gauri (Khauri)
    - Standard Jingpo, Nkhum (Enkun)
  - Northern
    - Northwestern
      - Numphuk
      - Turung
    - Northeastern
      - Duleng
      - Dingga

The Southern branch is characterized the loss of Proto-Jingpo final stop *-k in some lexical items. The Northern branch is characterized by the following mergers of Proto-Jingpo phonemes (Kurabe 2014:60).

- *ts- and *c-
- *dz- and *j-
- *ʔy- and *∅- (before front vowels)
- merger of Proto-Jingpo plain and preglottalized sonorants

== Grammar ==
Jingpo has verbal morphology that marks the subject and the direct object. Here is one example (the tonemes are not marked). The verb is 'to be' (rai).

| | | present | past |
|---|---|---|---|
| 1st person | singular | rai n ngai | rai sa ngai |
| 1st person | plural | rai ga ai | rai sa ga dai |
| 2nd person | singular | rai n dai | rai sin dai |
| 2nd person | plural | rai ma dai | rai ma sin dai |
| 3rd person | singular | rai ai | rai sai |
| 3rd person | plural | rai ma ai | rai ma sai |

== Phonology ==
The following is in Standard Jingpo:

=== Consonants ===
| | | Labial | | | Dental/ Alveolar | (Alveolo-) Palatal | Retroflex | Velar | | | Glottal |
| | | plain | pal. | fric. | Dental/ Alveolar | (Alveolo-) Palatal | Retroflex | plain | pal. | fric. | Glottal |
|---|---|---|---|---|---|---|---|---|---|---|---|
| Nasal | plain | m | mʲ | | n | ɲ | | ŋ | | | |
| Nasal | glottalized | ˀm | ˀmʲ | | ˀn | ˀɲ | | ˀŋ | | | |
| Plosive | voiceless | p | pʲ | pᶼ | t | | | k | kʲ | kᶼ | ʔ |
| Plosive | aspirated | pʰ | pʰʲ | pʰᶼ | tʰ | | | kʰ | kʰʲ | kʰᶼ | |
| Plosive | voiced | b | bʲ | bᶼ | d | | | ɡ | ɡʲ | ɡᶼ | |
| Affricate | voiceless | | | | ts | tɕ | | | | | |
| Affricate | aspirated | | | | tsʰ | tɕʰ | | | | | |
| Affricate | voiced | | | | dz | dʑ | | | | | |
| Fricative | | | | | s | ɕ | | | | | (h) |
| Approximant | plain | w | | | l | j | ɻ | | | | |
| Approximant | glottalized | ˀw | | | ˀl | ˀj | ˀɻ | | | | |

- /h/ is only marginal and often appears in loanwords.
- /ɻ/ can also be heard as a fricative [ʐ].

=== Vowels ===
| | Front | Central | Back |
|---|---|---|---|
| High | i | | u |
| Mid | e | ə | o |
| Low | | a | |

=== Tones ===
Jingpo has four tones in open syllables, and two tones in closed syllables (high and low). Tones are not usually marked in writing, although they can be transcribed using diacritics as follows:

| Tone | Orthography |
|---|---|
| High | á |
| Mid | a |
| Low | à |
| Falling | â |

== Vocabulary ==
The Jingpo lexicon contains a large number of words of both Tibeto-Burman and non-Tibeto-Burman stock, including Burmese and Shan. Burmese loan words reflect two strata, an older stratum reflecting the phonology of conservative written Burmese, and a newer stratum reflecting words drawn from modern Burmese phonology. The older strata consist of vocabulary borrowed from Burmese via Shan, which also exhibits the pre-modern phonology of Burmese vocabulary. Jingpo has also borrowed a large number of lexical items from Shan, with which it has been in close ethnolinguistic contact for several centuries. Jingpo, as the lingua franca in the northern highlands of Myanmar, has in turn been the source language of vocabulary into other regional languages like Rawang and Zaiwa.

== Orthography ==
=== Latin ===
The Jingpo writing system is a Latin-based alphabet consisting of 23 letters, and very little use of diacritical marks, originally created by American Baptist missionaries in the late 19th century.

Ola Hanson, one of the people who created the alphabet, arrived in Myanmar in 1890, learned the language and wrote the first Kachin–English dictionary.

Jinghpaw alphabet
| A ʔà | Ă ʔa̰ | E ʔɛ̰ | Ē ʔɛ̀ | È ʔɛ́ | I ʔì | O ʔɔ̀ | U ʔù | AI ʔàɪɴ | AU ʔáʊɴ |
| AW ʔɔ́ | OI ʔʊ̀ɛ́ | B ba̰ | CHY t͡ɕa̰ | D da̰ | G ɡa̰ | GY ɡa̰ja̰ | H ha̰ | J d͡ʑa̰ | K ka̰ |
| KY ka̰ja̰ | HK kʰa̰ | HKY kʰa̰ja̰ | L la̰ | M ma̰ | N na̰ | NG ŋa̰ | NY ɲa̰ | P pa̰ | HP pʰa̰ |
| HPY pʰa̰ja̰ | R ja̰ | S sʰa̰ | SH ʃa̰ | T ta̰ | TS sa̰ | HT tʰa̰ | W wa̰ | Y ja̰ | Z za̰ |

=== Burmese ===
Jingpo is also written in the Burmese alphabet.

==== Consonants ====
| Burmese | ဗ | ပ | ဖ | မ | ဝ | ဒ | တ | ထ | န | ည | သ | ၡ | ရ | လ | ယ | ဇ | စ | ဆ | ဂျ | ကျ | ချ | ဂ | က | ခ | င | ဟ | အ | ဗ် | ပ် | ဖွ | ွ | ြ | ျ |
| Latin | b | p | hp | m | w | d | t | ht | n | ny | s | š | r | l | y | dz | ts | hts | dž | tš | htš | g | k | hk | ng | h | ' | bv | pf | f | w | r | y |
| IPA | [b] | [p] | [pʰ] | [m] | [w] | [d] | [t] | [tʰ] | [n] | [ɲ] | [s] | [ɕ] | [ɻ~ʐ] | [l] | [j] | [d͡z] | [t͡s] | [t͡sʰ] | [d͡ʑ] | [t͡ɕ] | [t͡ɕʰ] | [ɡ] | [k] | [kʰ] | [ŋ] | [h] | [ʔ] | [bv~ʱb] | [pf~ʰp] | [f] | [‑ʷ-] | [‑ᶼ-] | [‑ʲ-] |

==== Vowels ====
[-a] is the inherent vowel in every syllable.

| Burmese | ိ | ု | ေ | ေါ | ဝ် | ယ် |
| Latin | i | u | e | o | ū | ī |
| IPA | [i] | [u] | [e] | [o] | [-u] | [-i] |

==== Other diacritics ====
- ာ – tone
- ် – marks final consonant by silencing [-a]

== Bibliography ==
- 景颇语-汉语词典 Jingpoyu – Hanyu cidian / Jingpo–Chinese dictionary, 戴庆夏 Dai Qingxia et al.
- 景颇语语法 Jingpoyu yufa / Jingpo Grammar, 戴庆夏 Dai Qingxia et al.
- Structures élémentaires de la parenté, de Claude Lévi-Strauss, devotes a chapter to the study of parenthood in the Jingpo ethnicity.
- Inglish, Douglas. 2005. A Preliminary Ngochang – Kachin – English Lexicon. Payap University, Graduate School, Linguistics Department.
- Kurabe, Keita. 2014. "Phonological inventories of seven Jingpoish languages and dialects." In Kyoto University Linguistic Research 33: 57–88, Dec 2014.
- Kurabe, Keita. 2013. Kachin folktales told in Jinghpaw. Collection KK1 at catalog.paradisec.org.au [Open Access]. https://dx.doi.org/10.4225/72/59888e8ab2122
- Kurabe, Keita. 2017. Kachin culture and history told in Jinghpaw. Collection KK2 at catalog.paradisec.org.au [Open Access]. https://dx.doi.org/10.26278/5fa1707c5e77c
