= Achang language =

Tibeto-Burman language of China and Myanmar

Achang
- Ngachang အာချန် / ငါချန်
- Pronunciation: [ŋa˨˩tʂhaŋ˨˩]
- Native to: China, Myanmar
- Ethnicity: Achang
- Native speakers: (60,000 cited 1990–2007)
- Language family: Sino-Tibetan: Tibeto-Burman; Lolo–Burmese; Burmish; Achang

Language codes
- ISO 639-3: acn
- Glottolog: acha1252
- ELP: Xiandao

The Achang language (Achang: Ngachang; Chinese: 阿昌, Burmese: အာချန်) is a Tibeto-Burman language spoken by the Achang (also known as Maingtha and Ngochang) in Yunnan, China, and northern Myanmar.

== Distribution ==
Achang is spoken in the following locations:

- Longchuan County, Dehong Prefecture
  - Husa 户撒
- Lianghe County, Dehong Prefecture
  - Zhedao 遮岛
  - Xiangsong 襄宋
  - Dachang 大厂
- Luxi City, Dehong Prefecture
  - Jiangdong 江东
- Longling County, Baoshan

The three main dialects of Achang in China are:

- Longchuan 陇川方言
- Lianghe 梁河方言
- Mangshi 芒市方言 (formerly known as Luxi 潞西方言)

The Xiandao dialect (100 speakers; autonym: Chintaw /kʰan³¹tau³¹/) is spoken in the following two locations in Yingjiang County, Dehong Prefecture (Xiandaoyu Yanjiu).

- Xiandaozhai 仙岛寨, Mangmian Village 芒面村, Jiemao Township 姐冒乡
- Meng'ezhai 勐俄寨, Mangxian Village 芒线村, Jiemao Township 姐冒乡

== Phonology ==
=== Consonants ===
Consonant phonemes
		Labial	Alveolar		Post-Alv.	Palatal	Velar	Glottal
		Labial	plain	sibilant	Post-Alv.	Palatal	Velar	Glottal
Stop	aspirated	pʰ	tʰ	tsʰ	tʃʰ	cʰ	kʰ	ʔ
Stop	voiced	b	d	dz	dʒ	ɟ	ɡ	ʔ
Fricative			s		ʃ	ç		h
Nasal		m	n				ŋ	
Approximant		w	l			j		

Voiced sounds /b, d, dz, dʒ, ɟ, ɡ/ can also be heard as voiceless [p, t, ts, tʃ, c, k] in free variation among speakers.

=== Vowels ===
Monophthongs
	Front	Central	Back
Close	i	ɯ	u
Mid	ɛ		ɔ
Open		aˑ a	
Syllabic		ŋ̍	

/i, ɛ, aˑ/ can also have lax vowel counterparts as [ɪ, æ, ʔaˑ].

== Syntax ==
Achang word order is subject–object–verb. There is no dominant order for nouns and their adjective modifiers.
