= Longchuan County, Yunnan =

Longchuan County 陇川县
- County

Other transcription(s)
  - Pinyin: Lǒngchuān Xiàn
  - Tai Nuea: ᥔᥦᥢᥱ ᥛᥫᥒᥰ ᥝᥢᥰ
  - Jingpho: Nshon Ginwang
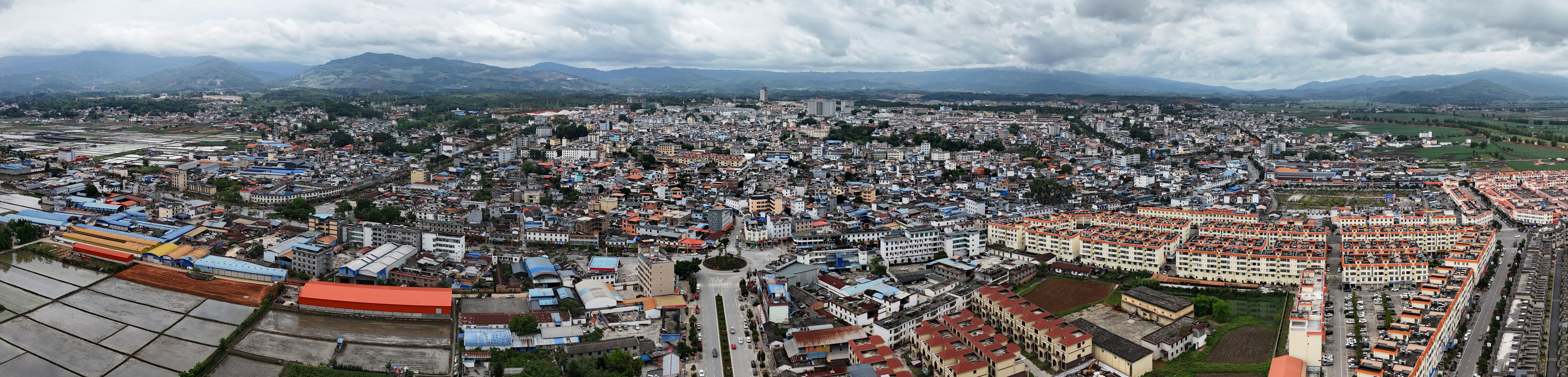
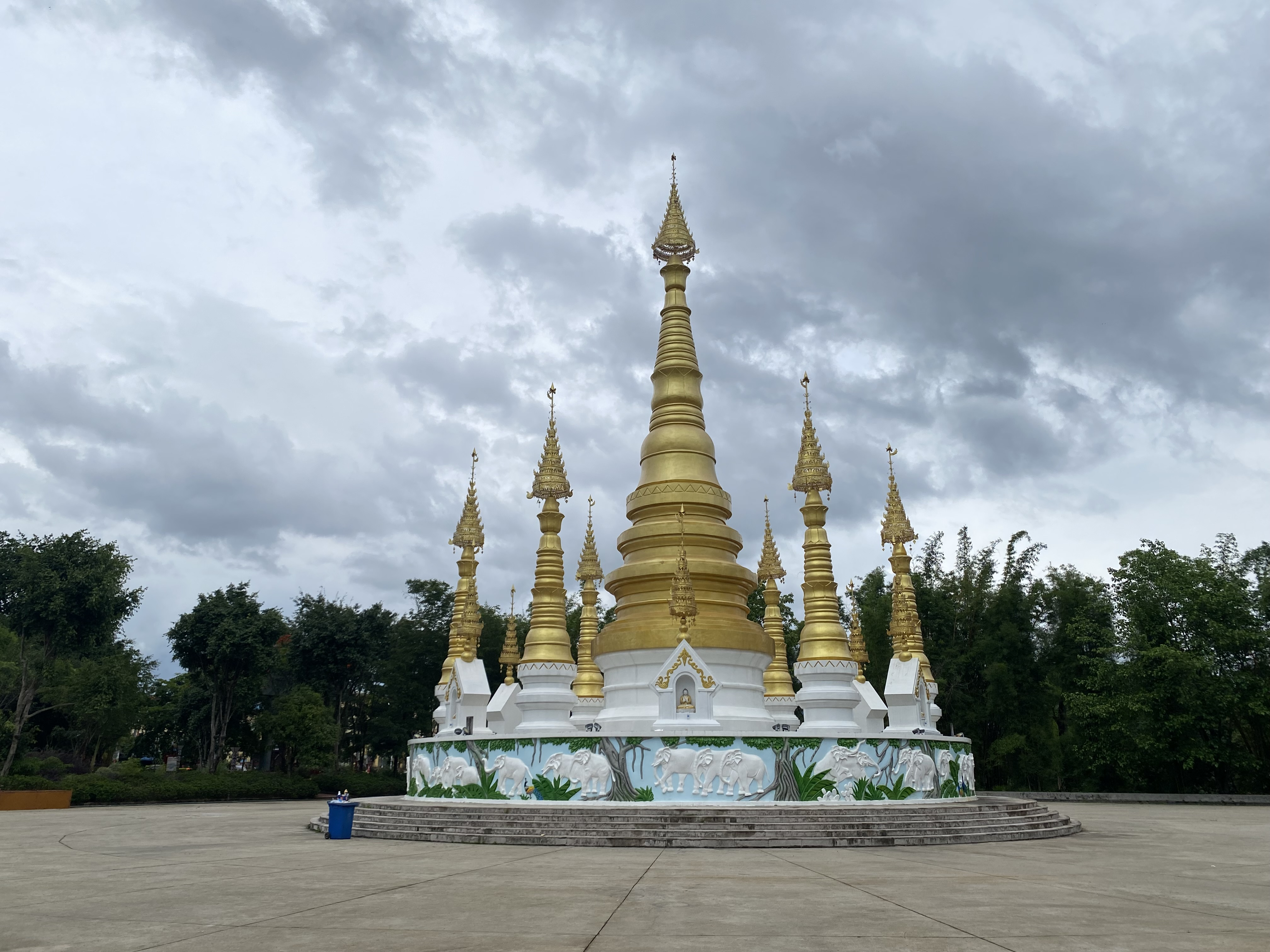
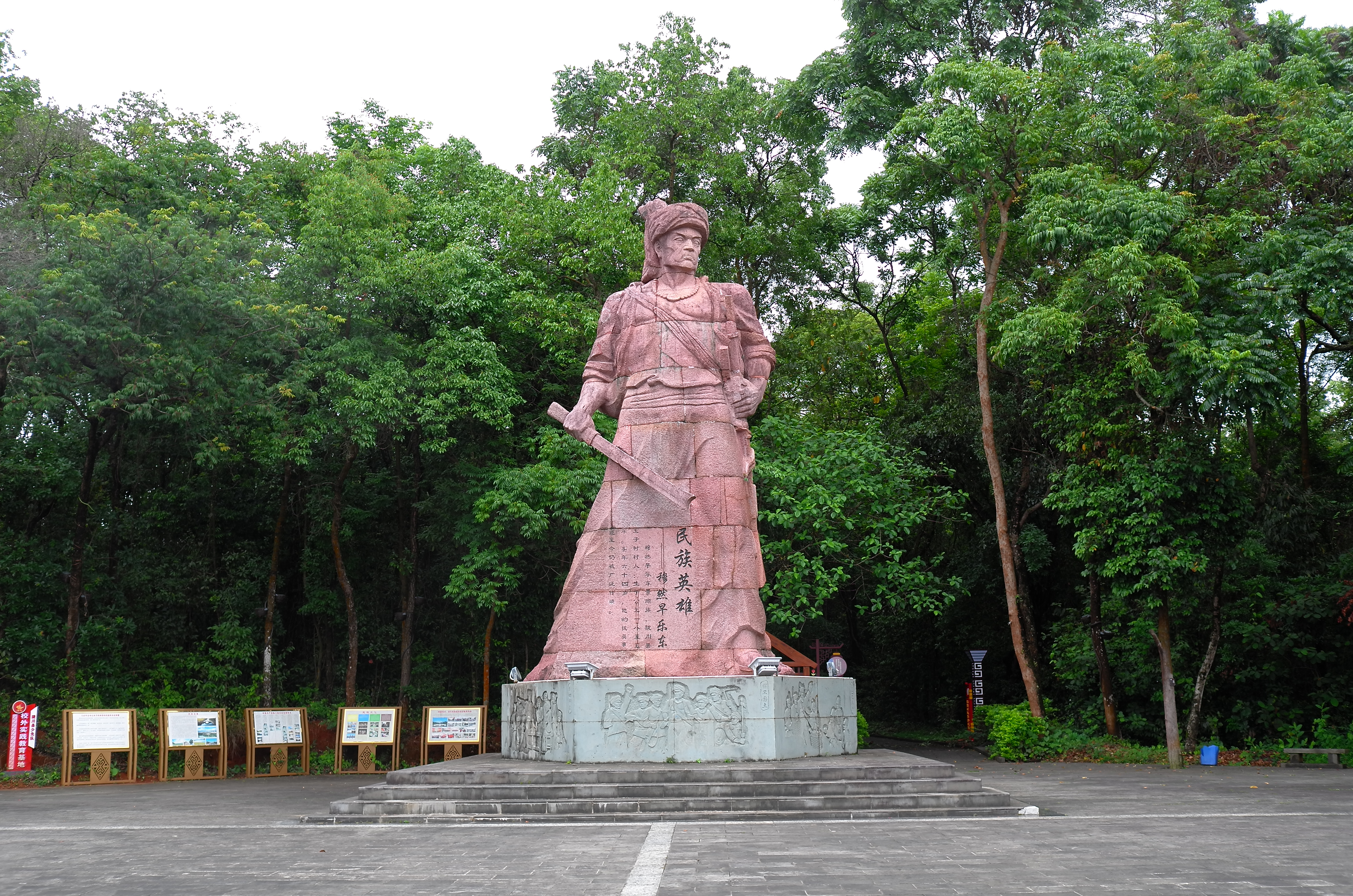
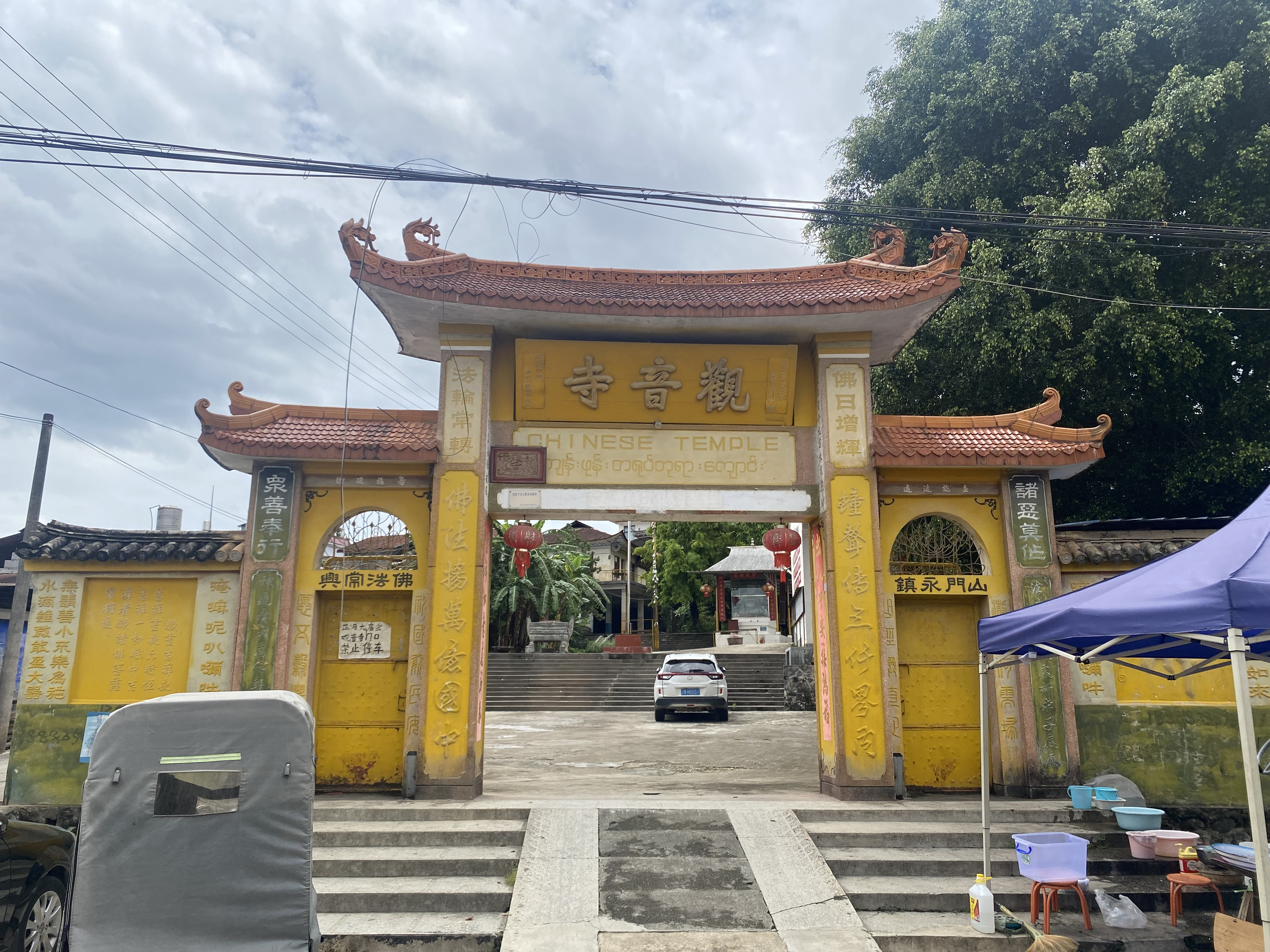
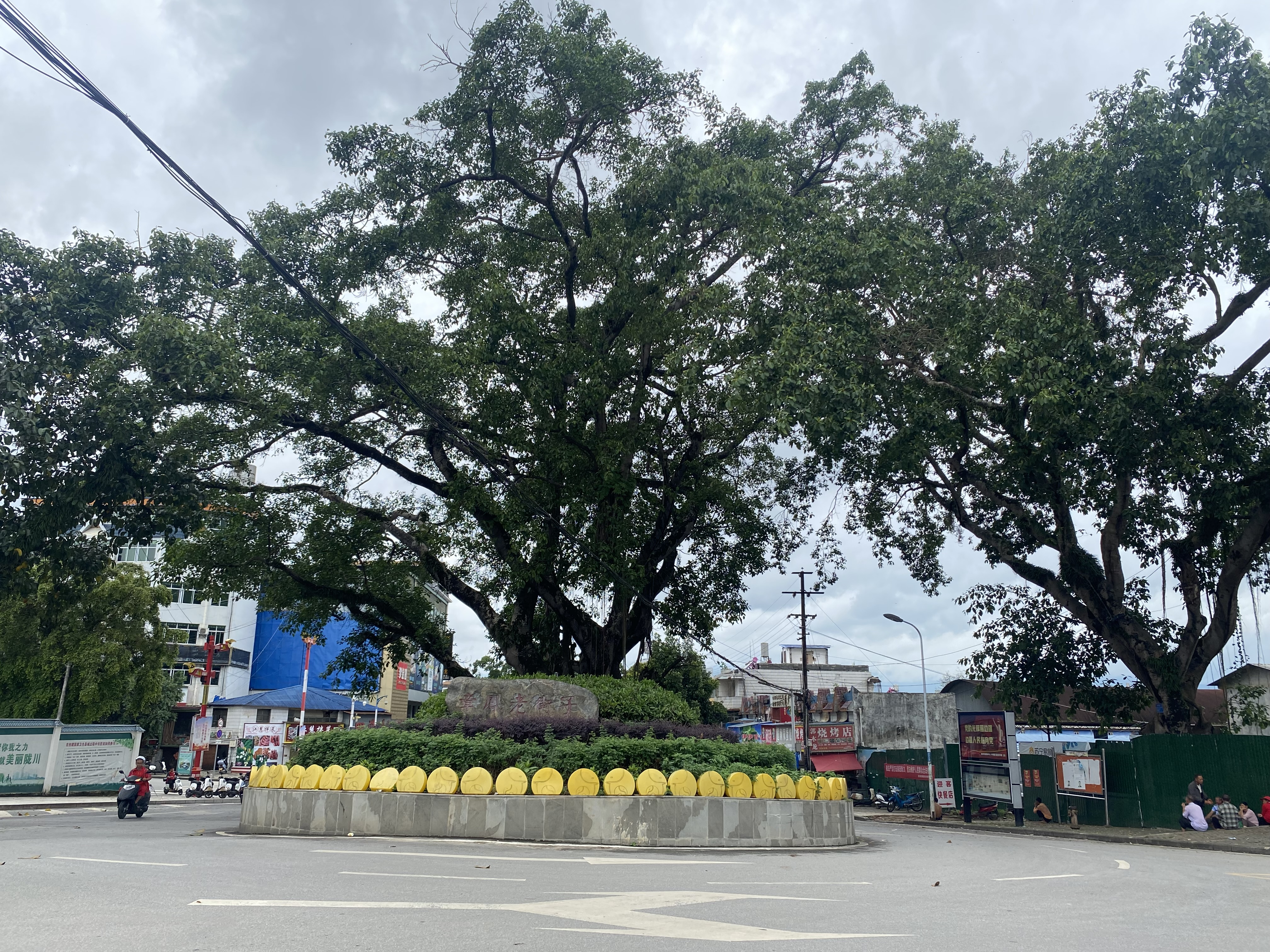
- Cityscape of county town White Elephant Stupa Statue of Zao Ledong Guanyin Temple Zhangfeng old street

- Location of Longchuan County in Dehong Prefecture within Yunnan province

- Location within China Longchuan County (China)
- Coordinates: 24.25°N 97.8333°E
- Country: China
- Province: Yunnan
- Autonomous prefecture: Dehong
- County seat: Zhangfeng

Area
  - Total: 1,931 km^{2} (746 sq mi)

Population (2020 census)
  - Total: 181,364
  - Density: 93.92/km^{2} (243.3/sq mi)
- Time zone: UTC+8 (CST)
- Postal code: 678700
- Area code: 0692
- Website: www.dhlc.gov.cn

Longchuan County (simplified Chinese: 陇川县; traditional Chinese: 隴川縣; pinyin: Lǒngchuān Xiàn; Tai Nüa: ᥔᥦᥢᥱ ᥛᥫᥒᥰ ᥝᥢᥰ; Jingpho: Nshon Ginwang; Thai: เมืองวัน) is a county located in Dehong Prefecture, Yunnan province, southwestern China.

== Administration ==
The county seat is in Zhangfeng Town (章凤镇).

Three other townships have been upgraded to town (镇, zhen) status: Longba (陇把), Chengzi (城子), Jinghan (景罕)

At present, Longchuan County has 4 towns, 4 townships and 1 ethnic township.

4 towns

- Zhangfeng (章凤镇)
- Longba (陇把镇)
- Jinghan (景罕镇)
- Chengzi (城子镇)

4 townships

- Huguo (护国乡)
- Qingping (清平乡)
- Wangzishu (王子树乡)
- Mengyue (勐约乡)

1 ethnic township

- Husa Achang Ethnic Township (户撒阿昌族乡)

== Culture ==
Many citizens of Dehong Prefecture belong to the Jingpo-nation ethnic group, an official minority in the People's Republic of China. They are one and the same as the people of Kachin State, the adjacent part of Myanmar, and ethno-linguistic ties are strong.

== History ==
Möng Wan was the commumicate of Tai people since more than 1,000 years ago in 1384 the formal first saopha was established here the first ruler come from Möng Mao but in 1441 Kawng Chai, the local Tai people made coup état to the descendants royal from Möng Mao and established himself to be saopha instead the original lineage, they have 28 saophas who were descendants from Kawng Chai to the mid-1900s.

== Climate ==
Climate data for Longchuan, elevation 991 m (3,251 ft), (1991–2020 normals, extremes 1981–present)
Month	Jan	Feb	Mar	Apr	May	Jun	Jul	Aug	Sep	Oct	Nov	Dec	Year
Record high °C (°F)	27.6 (81.7)	30.1 (86.2)	33.4 (92.1)	34.4 (93.9)	34.9 (94.8)	34.4 (93.9)	34.2 (93.6)	34.2 (93.6)	34.7 (94.5)	33.6 (92.5)	29.6 (85.3)	27.7 (81.9)	34.9 (94.8)
Mean daily maximum °C (°F)	22.2 (72.0)	24.4 (75.9)	27.6 (81.7)	29.5 (85.1)	29.2 (84.6)	28.5 (83.3)	27.7 (81.9)	28.6 (83.5)	28.7 (83.7)	27.4 (81.3)	25.1 (77.2)	22.5 (72.5)	26.8 (80.2)
Daily mean °C (°F)	11.8 (53.2)	14.0 (57.2)	17.7 (63.9)	20.8 (69.4)	22.6 (72.7)	23.6 (74.5)	23.5 (74.3)	23.7 (74.7)	22.9 (73.2)	20.6 (69.1)	16.5 (61.7)	12.9 (55.2)	19.2 (66.6)
Mean daily minimum °C (°F)	4.7 (40.5)	6.4 (43.5)	10.1 (50.2)	14.3 (57.7)	18.0 (64.4)	20.7 (69.3)	21.1 (70.0)	21.0 (69.8)	19.7 (67.5)	16.7 (62.1)	11.1 (52.0)	6.7 (44.1)	14.2 (57.6)
Record low °C (°F)	−2.9 (26.8)	−1.2 (29.8)	1.4 (34.5)	6.4 (43.5)	10.1 (50.2)	15.7 (60.3)	15.8 (60.4)	16.7 (62.1)	12.2 (54.0)	6.5 (43.7)	2.0 (35.6)	−0.8 (30.6)	−2.9 (26.8)
Average precipitation mm (inches)	18.4 (0.72)	15.0 (0.59)	20.1 (0.79)	63.0 (2.48)	164.0 (6.46)	285.1 (11.22)	333.3 (13.12)	240.7 (9.48)	160.4 (6.31)	133.1 (5.24)	43.6 (1.72)	10.5 (0.41)	1,487.2 (58.54)
Average precipitation days (≥ 0.1 mm)	2.8	3.8	5.2	9.9	17.8	25.1	26.7	24.0	19.4	14.2	5.4	2.4	156.7
Average relative humidity (%)	77	71	66	69	77	85	88	87	86	85	82	82	80
Mean monthly sunshine hours	234.1	230.4	256.3	242.7	203.5	123.7	93.9	131.6	143.4	166.1	206.0	219.0	2,250.7
Percentage possible sunshine	70	72	68	63	49	30	23	33	39	47	63	67	52
Source: China Meteorological Administration
