= Mengmao (disambiguation) =

Mengmao is a city town of Ruili, Yunnan, China.

Mengmao or Mongmao is may refer to:

- Ruili, city of Yunnan, China, with the Tai Nuea name of "Mengmao"
  - Möng Mao, ancient state based in Ruili during 13c. to 15c.
  - Chiefdom of Mengmao, tusi chiefdom based in Ruili during 17c. to 20c.
- Mongmao, a town in Wa state, Myanmar
  - Mongmao Township, a township in Wa state, Myanmar
