= Mengxiu Township =

Mengxiu Township 勐秀乡
- Township
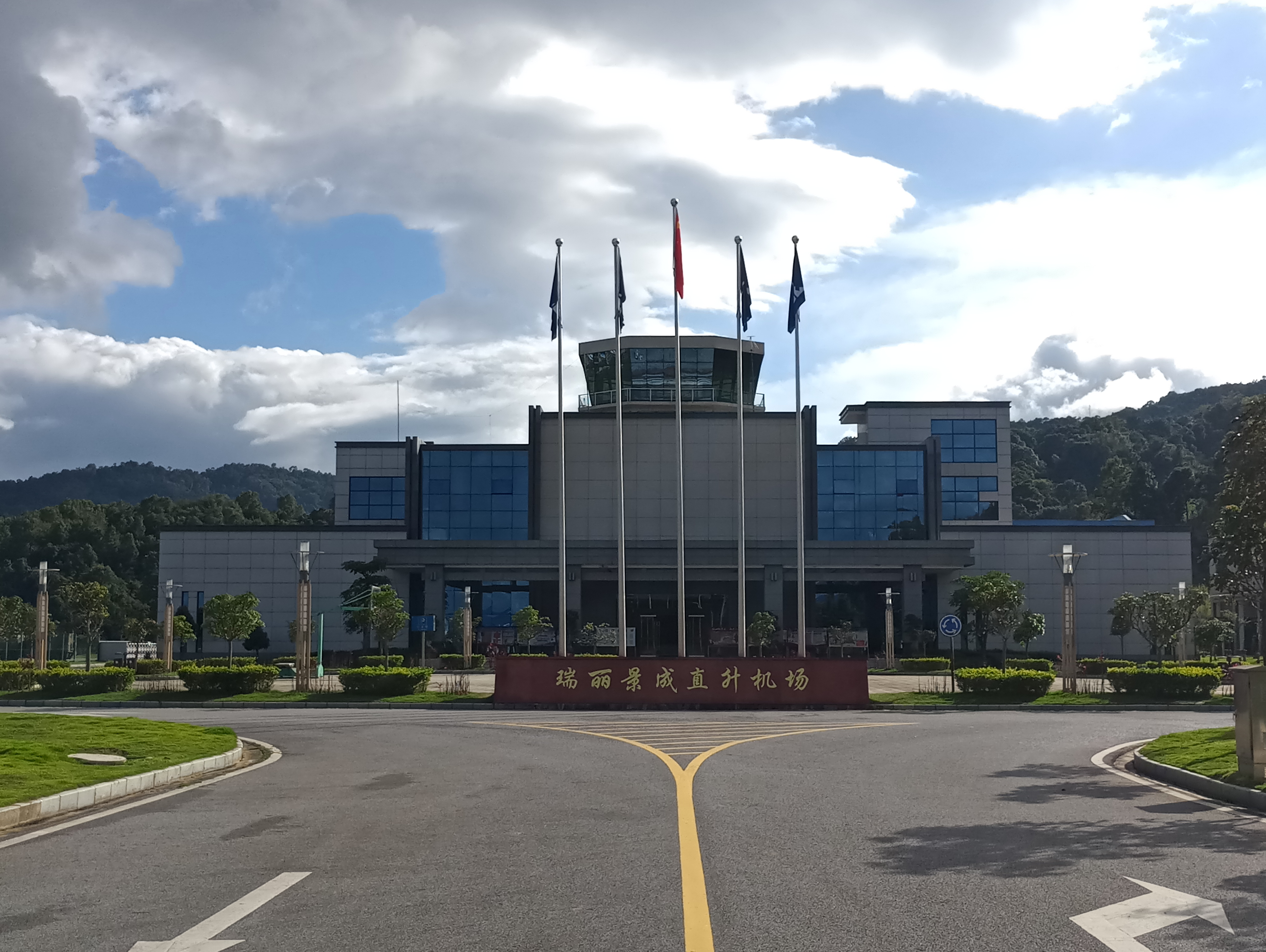
- Ruili Jingcheng Heliport

- Mengxiu Township in Ruili

- Location in Yunnan.
- Coordinates: 24°04′24″N 97°47′59″E
- Country: People's Republic of China
- Province: Yunnan
- Autonomous prefecture: Dehong Dai and Jingpo Autonomous Prefecture
- County-level city: Ruili
- Incorporated (township): 1986

Area
  - Total: 283.3 km^{2} (109.4 sq mi)

Population (2016)
  - Total: 11,786
  - Density: 41.60/km^{2} (107.8/sq mi)
- Time zone: UTC+08:00 (China Standard)
- Postal code: 678604
- Area code: 0692

Mengxiu Township (simplified Chinese: 勐秀乡; traditional Chinese: 勐秀鄉; pinyin: Měngxìu Xiāng; Tai Nüa: ᥛᥫᥒᥰ ᥞᥥᥝᥰ) is a township in Ruili, Yunnan, China. As of the 2016 statistics it had a population of 11,786 and an area of 283.3 square kilometres (109.4 sq mi).

== Etymology ==
The name of "Mengxiu" means a place where wild ginger grows in Dai language.

== Administrative divisions ==
As of 2016, the township is divided into seven villages:

- Mengxiu (勐秀村)
- Huwa (户瓦村)
- Hulan (户兰村)
- Mengdian (勐典村)
- Dengzha (等扎村)
- Nanjingli (南京里村)
- Xiaojie (小街村)

== History ==
In the Qing dynasty and Republic of China, the indigenous people were Jingpo people.

On 25 February 1956, the Government of Ruili County set up the Mengxiu Production and Culture Station (勐秀生产文化站) to maintain control of the region. In 1965. it came under the jurisdiction of Jiele District. During the Cultural Revolution, its name was changed to "Mengxiu People's Commune" and then "Red Flag People's Commune" (红旗公社). It was incorporated as a township in 1986.

== Geography ==
It lies at the northern of Ruili, bordering Myanmar to the northwest bounded by the Namwan River.

The highest point is Yingpan Mountain (营盘山), elevation 1,827 metres (5,994 ft). The forest coverage rate of the township is 74%.

== Economy ==
The township's economy is based on agriculture. The main crops are corn, rice, lemon, and walnut.

== Demographics ==
Population census
Year	Pop.	±%
2016	11,786	—

In 2016, the local population was 11,786, including 6,190 Han (52.52%) and 4,604 Jingpo (39.06%).

== Tourist attractions ==
The Ruili Botanical Garden sits in the township.

== Transportation ==
The China National Highway 556 passes across the township.

The Ruili Jingcheng Heliport serves the township.
