= Beth Kaplin =

American conservation scientist, professor and researcher

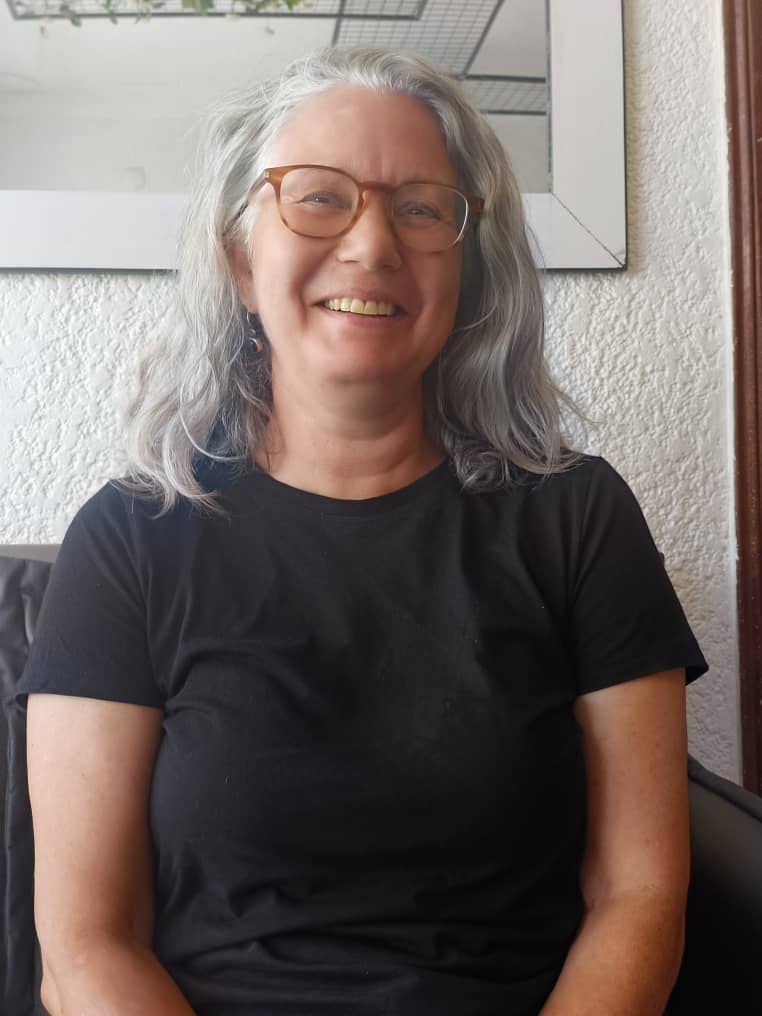
- Education: University of Wisconsin–Madison
- Occupations: Conservation scientist; professor; researcher
- Scientific career
- Fields: Conservation biology
- Workplaces: National University of Rwanda; University of Rwanda; University of Massachusetts Boston; Antioch University New England

Beth Kaplin is an American conservation scientist, professor and researcher. She is professor of conservation science in the College of Science and Technology at the University of Rwanda. She is also a research professor in the School for the Environment and a senior fellow at the Centre for Governance and Sustainability, both at the University of Massachusetts Boston.

== Education ==
She received a Ph.D. Dept of Zoology, University of Wisconsin–Madison, 1998; an M.Sc., department of Zoology; University of Wisconsin–Madison, 1994; and B.Sc Wildlife biology, Colorado State University, 1986. As an undergraduate, she studied Biological Sciences at Purdue University, 1981-83 with a focus on ecology and conservation science.

== Career ==
From 2006 to 2015, Kaplin raised over US$1 million from the MacArthur Foundation to develop BSc and MSc programs in biodiversity conservation at the National University of Rwanda.

From 1998 to 2018, Kaplin served as a faculty member in the Environmental Studies Department at Antioch University New England in the U.S. During her tenure, she held the position of program director for the Ph.D. program.

Kaplin serves as the director of the Centre of Excellence in Biodiversity and Natural Resource Management (CoEB) at the University of Rwanda. The CoEB focuses on advancing research and knowledge exchange and sustainable practices in biodiversity conservation and natural resource management. Under Kaplin's leadership, the centre has become a prominent hub of conservation and sciences in the region.

== Research ==
Much of Kaplin's research focuses on tropical ecology and conservation the main area of the study is Biodiversity information system,protected areas conservation, seed dispersal ecology and many more.

Kaplin recently studied the golden monkey, a subspecies of the blue monkey, residing in the Virunga volcanic mountains of the central Africa. Found in national parks such as Volcanoes, Virunga, and Kahuzi. The golden monkey lives in social groups of up to 30 individuals and feeds on bamboo leaves fruits and probably insects. Kaplin in her publication concluded that "unfortunately due to habitat destruction and recent conflicts in their limited range, the golden monkey is classified as endangered species on the IUCN Red list".
