= List of prisons in Yunnan =

This is a list of prisons in Yunnan province of the People's Republic of China.

Name	Enterprise name	City/County/District/Prefecture	Village/Town	Established	Notes
Aihua Prison		Lincang City	Aihua		
Anning Juvenile Offender Detachment		Anning City, Kunming			
An'ning Prison	Guangming Phosphate Fertilizer Plant; Guangming Farm Garden	Anning City, Kunming	Fu'an, Jiexiang	1965	Exports to the United States, Japan and Southeast Asia
Baoshan Prison	Wujiu Mercury Plant; Baoshan Machine Works; Xinguang Farm; Quarry Plant	Changning County, Baoshan		1952	
Chuxiong Prison		Chuxiong Yi Autonomous Prefecture			
Dali Prison	Baiya Lead Works	Dali Bai Autonomous Prefecture		1952	Formerly Heqing Prison
Guandu Prison	Yunnan Jinma Metal Cooling Factory	Guandu District, Kunming	Dabanqiao	1984	Has elderly, ill and disabled inmates
Jianshui Prison		Jianshui County			
Jingdong Prison	Wenhua Farm; Jingdong Cooking Oil Factory; Wenhua Farm Yixiang Hollow Brick	Jingdong Yi Autonomous County		1959	
Jinghong Prison	Puwen Farm; Jinghong Machine Plant; Puwen Tea Factory; Puwen Farm Rubber Factory	Jinghong City, Xishuangbanna Dai Autonomous Prefecture		1955	Over 1,000 inmates
Kunming Prison	Yunnan Jinma Agricultural Vehicle Manufacturing Plant	Guandu District, Kunming		1952	
Lijiang Prison	Dayan Farm	Lijiang City		1951	Houses about 2,000 prisoners, including women
Lincang Prison	Mianning Farm	Lincang City		1955	
Mengzi Prison		Mengzi County, Honghe Hani and Yi Autonomous Prefecture	Caoba		Possibly part of Xiaolongtan Prison
Prov. Juvenile Offender Detachment				1957	
Provincial No. 1 Prison	Jinma General Diesel Engine Plant	Kunming		1953	Main product is Jinma diesel engine, whose export to the U. S. has been banned
Provincial No. 2 Prison	Jinma General Machinery Plant; Yunnan Pesticide Machinery Factory	Xishan District, Kunming	Heilinpu	1951	Houses nearly 10,000 inmates, sprayer of Yunfeng model is produced
Provincial No. 3 Prison	Guangming Phosphate Chemical Factory	Anning City, Kunming		1965	Exports to Japan, Korea and Southeast Asia
Provincial No. 4 Prison		Zhanyi County, Qujing City		1996	Can hold up to 3,000 persons
Provincial No. 1 Women's Prison	Kunyang Farm	Jinning County	Kunyang	1953	
Provincial No. 2 Women's Prison	Yunnan Kunyu Bedding Factory			1999	3,600 in about 2008
Qujing Prison	Fuyuan Iron Works; Ludong Coal Mine	Qujing City			Sells under Fukuang brand
Songming Prison	Cement Plant; Siying Coal Mine	Kunming			4,800 inmates
Wuhua Prison	Wuhua Prison Timber Processing Factory; Yunnan Jinma Auto Motorcycle Repair Factory electric Network Branch Plant	Wuhua District, Kunming			Exports to South Korea, Japan and Taiwan
Xiaolongtan Prison	Xiaolongtan Coal Mine	Kaiyuan City, Honghe, Yunnan	Xiaolongtan	1953	
Yanglin Prison	Jinma Automobile Frame Plant	Songming County	Yanglin	1952	
Yanshan Prison	Cement Plant; Yanshan County Chongka Xianshi Grape Plantation	Yanshan County, Wenshan Zhuang and Miao Autonomous Prefecture		1956	
Yao'an Prison	Caohai Farm	Yao'an County			
Yiliang Prison		Yiliang County, Kunming			About 3,000 inmates
Yuanjiang Prison	Yuanjiang Farm	Yuanjiang Hani, Yi and Dai Autonomous County, Yuxi		1954	
Yuxi Prison		Hongta District, Yuxi	Huanian	1953	
Zhaotong Prison	Jinsha Lead and Zinc Mine; Zhaotong Xinsheng Machine Works	Zhaotong City		1951	About 2,500 inmates
Zhong'an Prison	Fuyuan Ore Factory	Fuyuan County, Qujing City	Zhong'an		

== Sources ==
- "Laogai Handbook 2007-2008" (PDF) (in Chinese and English). Washington, D.C.: Laogai Research Foundation. October 2008. pp. 491–510. ISBN 978-1-931550-25-3.
