= Mangshi River =

Mangshi River 芒市河
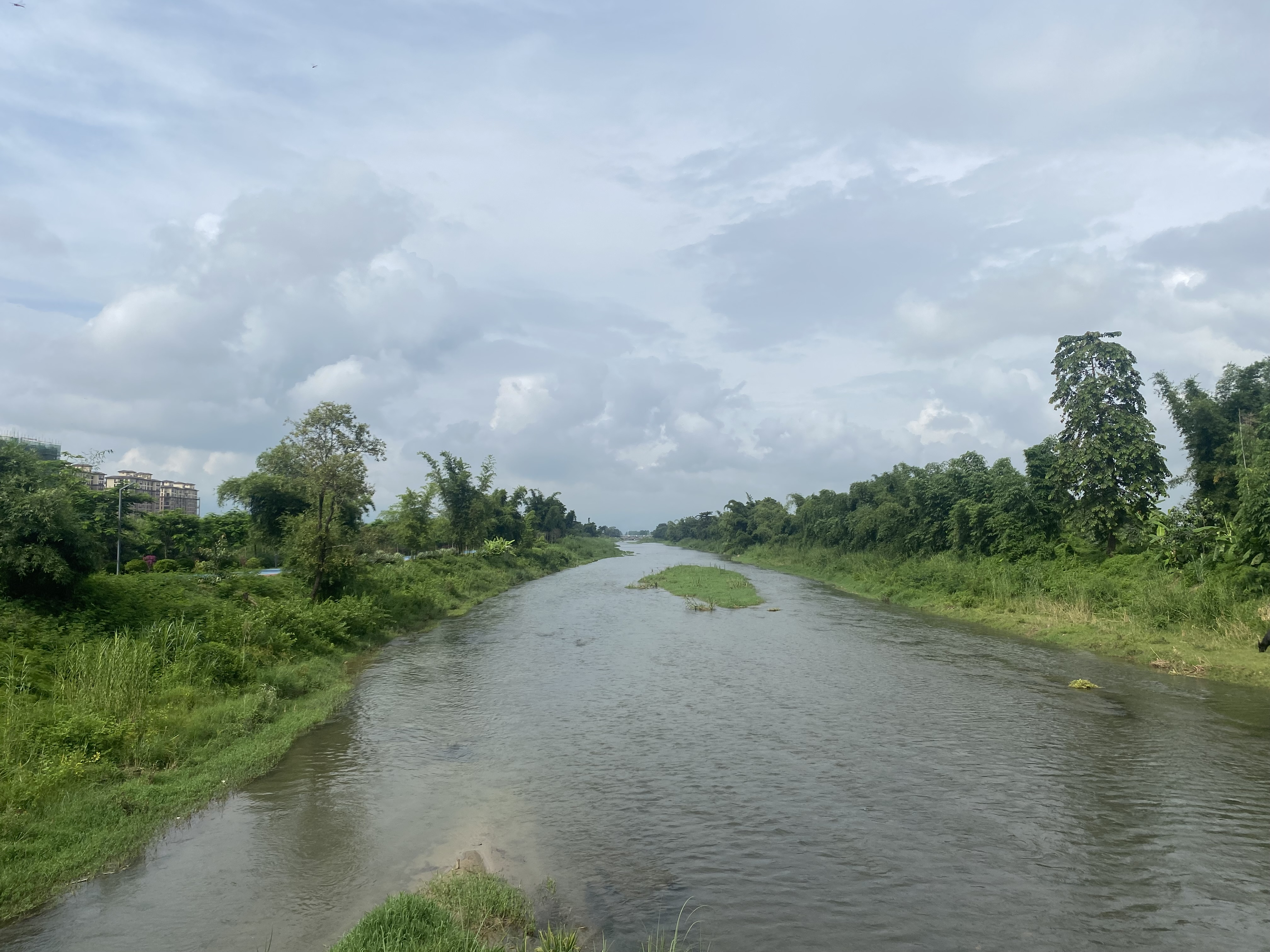
- Mangshi River at urban of Mangshi

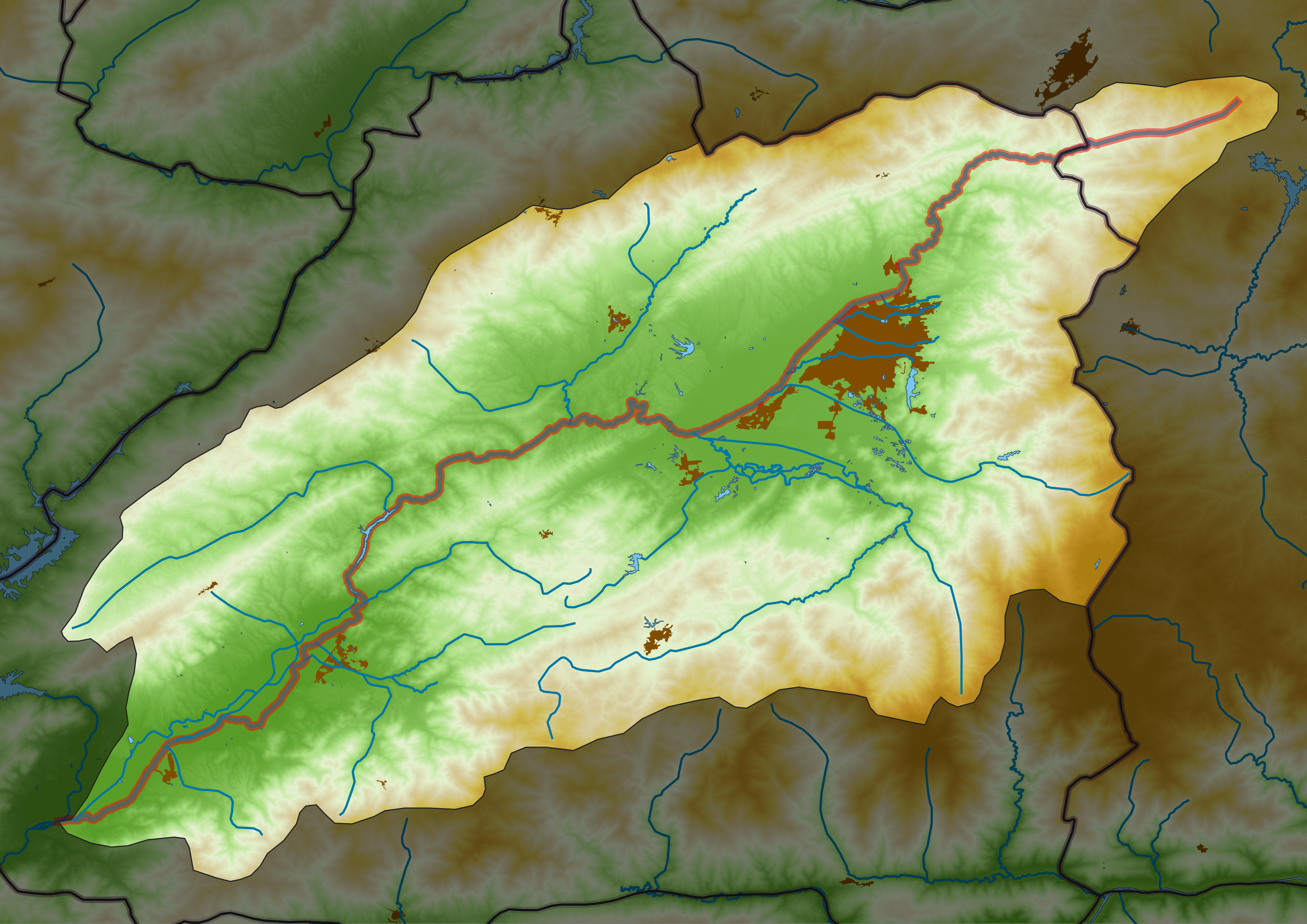
- Mangshi River and its drainage basin

Physical characteristics
- Source
  - location: Jingzhuping Village in Longxin Township, Longling County, Baoshan
  - elevation: 2,235 m
- Mouth
  - location: Gazhong Village in Zhefang, Mangshi, Dehong Dai and Jingpo Autonomous Prefecture
  - coordinates: 24°10′09″N 98°07′32″E
  - elevation: 783 m
- Length: 117.1 km
- Basin size: 1,881 km²
- Discharge
  - average: 62.3 m³/s

Basin features
- River system: Irrawaddy River
- Population: 0.29 million (2004)

Mangshi River (Chinese: 芒市河; Tai Nüa: ᥘᥛᥳ ᥑᥩᥢᥴ) also called Mangshi Large River (Chinese: 芒市大河), is a river in western Yunnan, mainly in the territory of Mangshi City. It is the largest tributary river of Shweli River in China, which is a tributary river of Irrawaddy. The source of Mangshi River is at Longxin Township in Longling County, Baoshan, and the upper also called Bawan River (Chinese: 八湾河). Mangshi River flows through the west fields of Mangshi city, and it flows in Shweli River at Gazhong Village (Chinese: 戛中村) in Zhefang. It is the mother river of Mangshi. The length of Mangshi River is 117.1 km, and the basin size is 1,881 km², about 61.3% of area of Mangshi City.
