= Nongdao =

Nongdao 弄岛镇
- Town
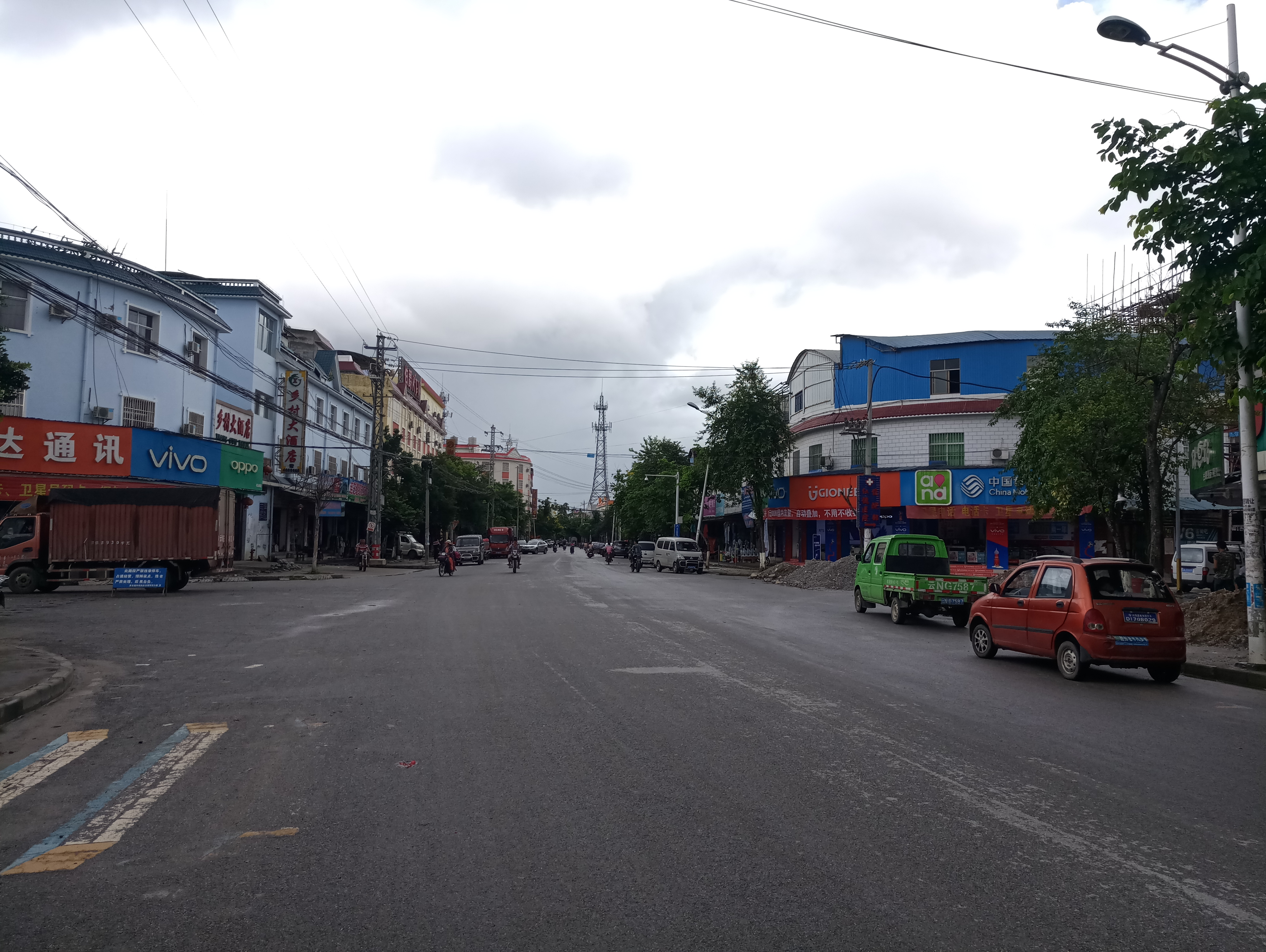
- Residential buildings in the town

- Nongdao in Ruili

- Location in Yunnan.
- Coordinates: 23°52′40″N 97°39′37″E
- Country: People's Republic of China
- Province: Yunnan
- Autonomous prefecture: Dehong Dai and Jingpo Autonomous Prefecture
- County-level city: Ruili
- Designated (town): 1934

Area
  - Total: 99 km^{2} (38 sq mi)

Population (2016)
  - Total: 14,146
  - Density: 140/km^{2} (370/sq mi)
- Time zone: UTC+08:00 (China Standard)
- Postal code: 678603
- Area code: 0692

Nongdao (simplified Chinese: 弄岛镇; traditional Chinese: 弄島鎮; pinyin: Nòngdǎo Zhèn; Tai Nüa: ᥘᥩᥒᥴ ᥖᥝᥰ) is a town in Ruili, Yunnan, China. As of the 2016 statistics it had a population of 14,146 and an area of 142.89 square kilometres (55.17 sq mi).

== Etymology ==
The name of "Nongdao" means moss pond in Dai language.

== Administrative division ==
As of 2016, the town is divided into four villages:

- Nongdao (弄岛村)
- Dengxiu (等秀村)
- Leiyun (雷允村), also called Lowing
- Dengga (等嘎村)

== History ==
In 1932, the Yunnan government set up the Ruili Administrative Bureau (瑞丽设治局), the government office was in the town. Two years later, Nongdao was designated as a town. At the end of 1948, the Ruili Incident broke out, the Jingpo people burned down the government office. After the establishment of the Communist State in 1949, it came under the jurisdiction of the 3rd District of Ruili County. During the Cultural Revolution, it was renamed "Weidong People's Commune" (卫东公社; 'People's Commune of Defending Mao Zedong') and then "Nongdao People's Commune" (弄岛公社). Nongdao became a district in 1984 and a township in 1986. In February 1993, the Nongdao Economic Development Zone was founded in the town. In May 2000, it was upgraded to a town. In 2005, the economic development zone merged into the town. In 2013, Ruili government moved the Ruili Border Economic Cooperation Zone to Nongdao.

== Geography ==
Nongdao is located at the confluence of Namwan River and Shweli River.

The town is located in the southwestern Ruili and borders Myanmar in the northwest, southwest and southeast, with a border of 42.8 kilometres (26.6 mi).

The highest point in the town is Sanda Mountain (三达山) which stands 1,266 metres (4,154 ft) above sea level. The lowest point is Rongbangwang (容棒旺), which, at 743.2 metres (2,438 ft) above sea level.

== Economy ==
The town's economy is based on nearby border trade and agricultural resources. The main crops are rice, sugarcane and tobacco.

The Ruili Border Economic Cooperation Zone is located in the town.

The Sino-Myanmar pipelines enters China from the town.

== Demographics ==
Population census
| Year | Pop. | ±% |
|---|---|---|
| 2016 | 14,146 | — |

In 2016, the local population was 14,146, including 2,167 Han (15.3%), 10,920 Dai (77.2%) and 1,018 Jingpo (7.2%).

== Tourist attractions ==
The Site of Central Aircraft Manufacturing Company (Lowing Factory) and Mang'ai Temple are popular attractions in the town.

== Transportation ==
The Longling–Ruili Expressway passes across the town.
