= Mengmao =

Mengmao 勐卯街道
- Subdistrict
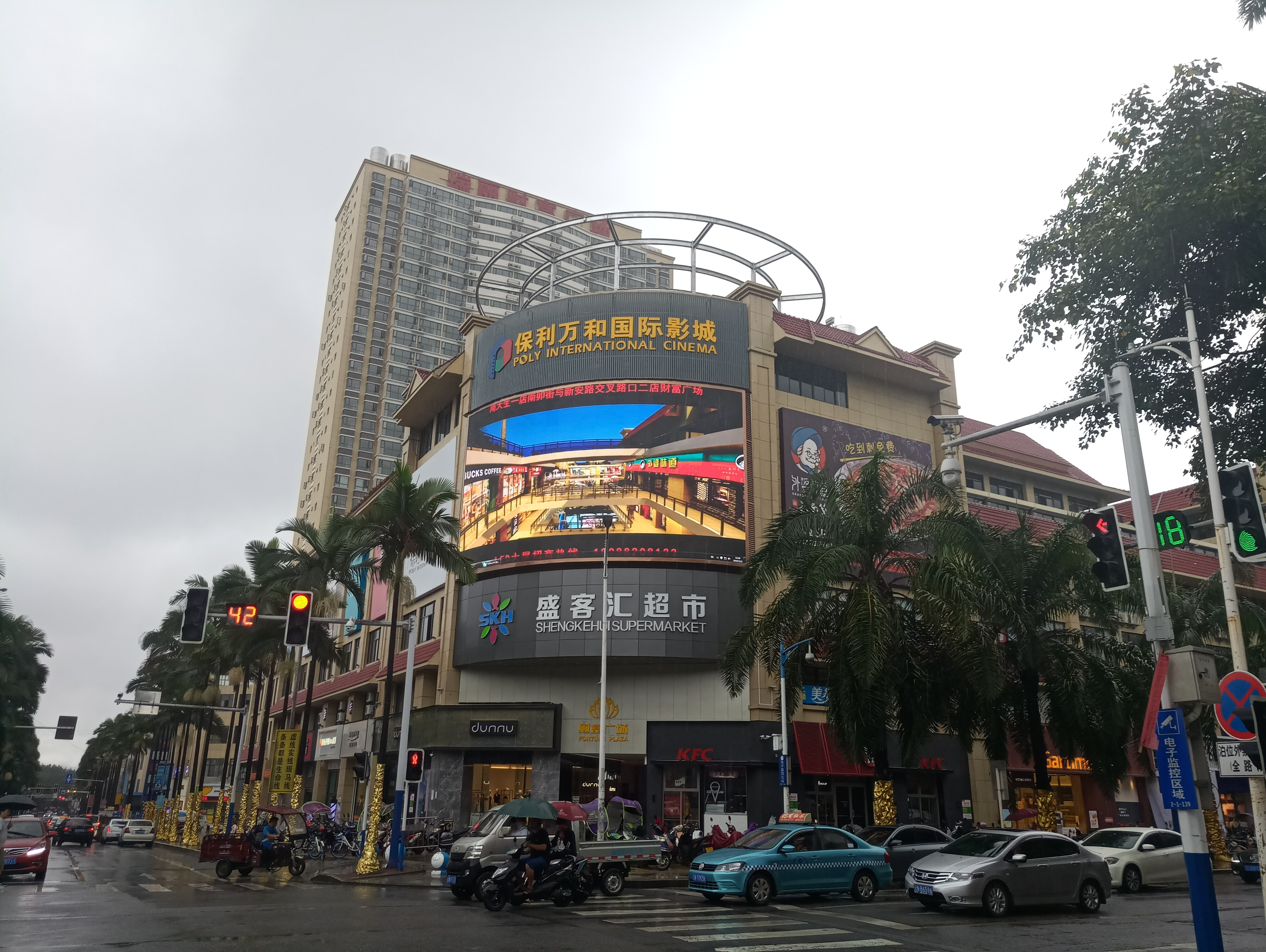
- Ruili Fortune Center

- Mengmao in Ruili

- Location in Yunnan.
- Coordinates: 23°59′53″N 97°51′29″E
- Country: People's Republic of China
- Province: Yunnan
- Autonomous prefecture: Dehong Dai and Jingpo Autonomous Prefecture
- County-level city: Ruili
- Designated (town): 1934

Area
  - Total: 232.3 km^{2} (89.7 sq mi)

Population (2016)
  - Total: 104,681
  - Density: 450.6/km^{2} (1,167/sq mi)
- Time zone: UTC+08:00 (China Standard)
- Postal code: 678699
- Area code: 0692

Mengmao (Chinese: 勐卯街道; pinyin: Měngmǎo Jiēdào; Tai Nüa: ᥛᥫᥒᥰ ᥛᥣᥝᥰ) is a subdistrict in Ruili, Yunnan, China. As of the 2016 statistics it had a population of 104,681 and an area of 232.3 square kilometres (89.7 sq mi). It is the political, economic and cultural center of Ruili.

== Etymology ==
"Mengmao" means "foggy place" in Dai language.

== Administrative divisions ==
As of 2016, the town is divided into seven villages and eight communities:

- Youyi Community (友谊社区)
- Luchuan Community (麓川社区)
- Xing'an Community (兴安社区)
- Munao Community (目瑙社区)
- Ruifeng Community (瑞丰社区)
- Menglongsha Community (勐龙沙社区)
- Maoxiang Community (卯相社区)
- Guomen Community (国门社区)
- Tuanjie (团结村)
- Mengmao (勐卯村)
- Jiegang (姐岗村)
- Jiele (姐勒村)
- Jiedong (姐东村)
- Mangling (芒令村)
- Mengli (勐力村)

== History ==
Mengmao was designated as a town in 1934 by Ruili Shezhi Bureau (瑞丽设治局). After the establishment of the Communist State in 1949, it came under the jurisdiction of the 1st District of Ruili County. In 1969, during the Cultural Revolution, it was renamed "Mengmao People's Commune" and then "Hongcheng People's Commune" (红城公社; 'Red City People's Commune'). After smashing the Gang of Four, the town reverted to its former name of "Mengmao". The Jiele Township (姐勒乡), Yinhe Subdistrict (银河街道; 'Galaxy Subdistrict') and Ruihong Subdistrict (瑞宏街道) were merged into Mengmao in January 2005. In October 2006, Tuanjie Village (团结村; 'Unity Village') and Maoxiang Community (卯相社区) of Ruili Border Economic Cooperation Zone were merged into Mengmao. Yunnan provincial government approve revoking Mengmao Town and establish Mengmao Subdistrict on 11 August 2021.

== Geography ==
The highest point in the town is Huyong Mountain (户永山) which stands 2,019.2 metres (6,625 ft) above sea level. The lowest point is Bingwu Village (丙午村), which, at 754 metres (2,474 ft) above sea level. The local forest coverage is 50.48%.

The Shweli River flows through the town.

The Nongmo Lake is an oxbow lake is located in the town.

== Economy ==
The local economy is primarily based upon agriculture and local industry. The main crops are rice, sugarcane, vegetables, medicinal materials, rubber, coffee and grapefruit.

== Demographics ==
Population census
Year	Pop.	±%
2016	104,681	—

In 2016, the local population was 104,681, including 68,357 Han (65.3%), 28,055 Dai (26.8%) and 3,769 Jingpo (3.6%).

== Tourist attractions ==
There are many natural and cultural landscapes in the town, the most famous of which are the Jiele Gold Pagoda, Nong'an Pagoda, Hansha Temple, Pinglu Townsite, Zhaduo Waterfall, and Nongmo Lake.

== Transportation ==
Mengmao is the end of Longling–Ruili Expressway, China National Highway 320, and China National Highway 556.
