= Kunming Economic and Technology Development Zone =

The Kunming Economic and Technology Development Zone (KETDZ) is a state-level economic development zone established on February 13, 2000, in East Kunming, Yunnan Province, China. It is administratively under Kunming Prefecture. It has a developed area of 6 square kilometers.

== Industrial structure ==
The KETDZ has formed the industrial chain with the following major industries as its pillar industries:

- tobacco and related industries
- IT and electronics manufacturing
- bio-pharmaceuticals, food processing
- new materials development industry

== Investment priorities ==
Established industries

- integrated optical-electric-mechanical industry
- biofood industry
- bio-pharmaceutical industry

Commercialization and marketing

- information electronics
- high-efficiency agriculture
- new materials
- new building materials
- environment-friendly technologies

Investment and modernization

- Logistics
- Trading services

Economic spin-offs

- Venture capital
- Intermediary services
- Cultural programs
- Educational programs

== Communication and transportation ==
=== Road ===
The KETDZ is 4 kilometers from the downtown Kunming, where the highways lead straight to the China-Laos border town of Mohan, the China-Vietnam border town of Hekou, and the China-Myanmar (Burma) border town of Ruili. All three border towns are rated as Grade A border ports of China. All the highways within a radius of 200 kilometers from Kunming are of high-grade standards.

=== Railway ===
A railroad network has been built around Kunming, consisting of the Guiyang-Kunming, Chengdu-Kunming, Nanning-Kunming, Guangtong-Dali, and Yunnan-Vietnam Railways. The KETDZ is 2 kilometers away from the Kunming East Railway Station, and 4 kilometers from the Kunming South Railway Station, both are rail centers for both cargo and passenger transportation.

=== Air transportation ===
The Kunming International Airport, 1.8 kilometers from the KETDZ, is Yunnan's most important gateway to international destinations. It operates eight air routes to overseas airports such as Singapore, Rangoon, Kuala Lumpur, Seoul, Osaka, and more than 70 domestic routes to Hong Kong, Macao, and other cities.

=== Harbor ===
The KETDZ has access to ocean shipping at the Beihai and Fangcheng Ports in Guangxi province via the Nanning-Kunming Railway, at Zhanjiang Port of Guangdong province via the Guiyang-Kunming Railway, at Shanghai Port, and at Haiphong of Vietnam via the Yunnan-Vietnam Railway.

== See also ==
- Kunming High-tech Industrial Development Zone
- Hekou Border Economic Cooperation Zone
- Ruili Border Economic Cooperation Zone
- Wanding Border Economic Cooperation Zone
- Economic and Technological Development Zones
