= Kunming High-tech Industrial Development Zone =

The Kunming High-tech Industrial Development Zone is a state-level high-tech industrial zone established in 1992 in Northwest Kunming, Yunnan Province, China. It is administratively under Kunming Prefecture. It covers an area of 9 square kilometers. The zone is located in the northwest part of Kunming city, four kilometers from Kunming Railway Station and five kilometers from Kunming International Airport.

Yunnan province has rich deposits of phosphorus, salt, aluminum, copper, lead, zinc, tin and is famous for its production of Yunnan tea, coffee, rubber, and tobacco. Kunming's key industries draw on these resources to manufacture steel, non-ferrous metals, building materials, chemicals, diesel engines and machine tools. In the past few years, the traditional economy has diversified through growth of advanced technology industries such as biotech, optoelectronics, and information technologies. Many of these industries are located in the Kunming High-tech Industrial Development Zone. These key industries accounted for 80% of the Kunming's US$9.3 billion gross industrial output value in 2004, a 26% increase over 2003.

== Incubators, Sub-zones and Sub-parks ==
Incubators, high tech parks and industrial zones inside Kunming High Tech Industrial Development Zone are:

- Kunming Power Equipment Industrial Base
- State Level Kunming Pioneering Service Center
- State Level Yunnan Software Park
- State Level Yunnan University Science Park
- Yunnan Pioneering Park for Returned Overseas Scholar
- Kunming Modern Bio-medicine Industrial Park
- State Level Yunnan High & New Product Export Center
- Kunming Public Bonded Warehouse
- Bio-tech Innovative Park
- Yunnan New Material Incubator
- Yunnan Kunming Production Force Promotion Center
- and others.

== Companies and Industry Structure ==
As of 2007, Kunming High Tech Industrial Development Zone has hosted 3,165 companies including 1 company with an annual turnover of 10 billion Yuan. Investors come from more than 25 countries and regions such as US, Russia, UK, France, Japan, Australia, Hong Kong and Taiwan. In 2007, Kunming High Tech Industrial Development Zone had a total income of 46.3 billion Yuan and an industrial output of 40.8 billion Yuan.

Four pillar industries at Kunming High Tech Industrial Development Zone are biology and biomedicine industry, electronic & information technology, Opto-Mechtronics and new materials industry.

The new materials industry, led by new type metal materials, organic functional polymer materials and materials surface engineering technology, takes a share of 65% among the overall industry output of Kunming High Tech Industrial Development Zone. Flagship companies in new material industry including Yunnan Copper Ltd, Sino Platinum Metal Ltd, Yunnan Reascend Science and Technology Ltd have formed an industrial cluster based on Yunnan National Rare Metal Manufacturing Base.

The biology and bio-medicine industry, led by Kunming Pharmaceutical Corporation, Dihon Pharmaceutical Ltd, Kunming Jida Pharmaceutical Ltd, Institute of Medical Biology of CAMS and Miaosen Biology ltd, takes a share of 25% among the overall industry output of Kunming High Tech Industrial Development Zone.

Opto-Mechatronics industry, led by Yunnan Nantian Electronics Information Ltd, Yunnan Transformer Electric Ltd, North Night Vision Technology Limited Company, Kunming Jin An Li Information Technology Ltd and Kunming Yun Jin Di Geo-information Ltd, takes a share of 7% among the overall industry output of Kunming High Tech Industrial Development Zone.

== See also ==
- Kunming Economic and Technology Development Zone
- Hekou Border Economic Cooperation Zone
- Ruili Border Economic Cooperation Zone
- Wanding Border Economic Cooperation Zone
- Economic and Technological Development Zones
