= Huyu Township =

Huyu Township 户育乡
- Township
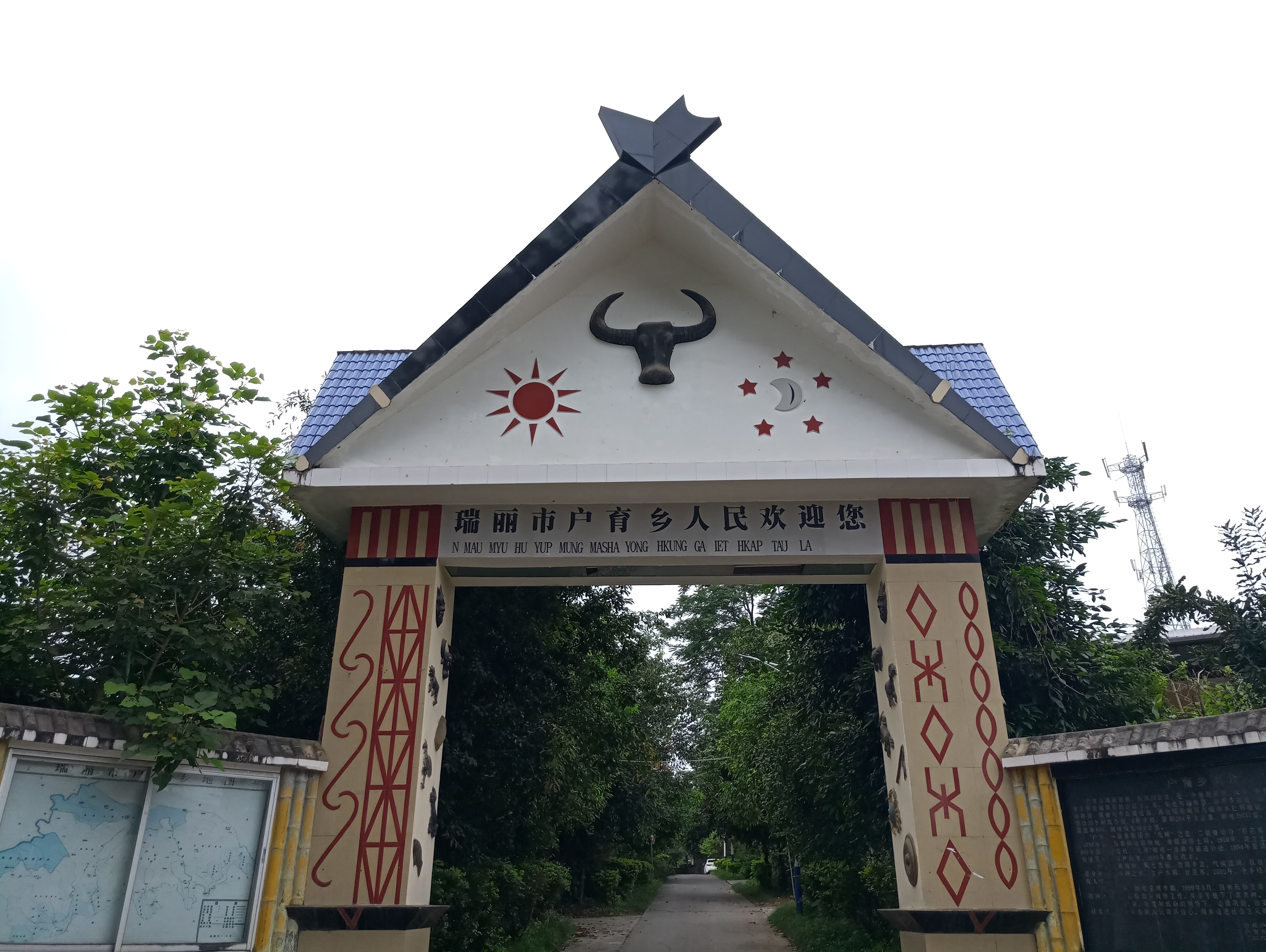
- Entrance of the Government of Huyu Township

- Huyu Township in Ruili

- Location in Yunnan.
- Coordinates: 23°57′08″N 97°43′50″E
- Country: People's Republic of China
- Province: Yunnan
- Autonomous prefecture: Dehong Dai and Jingpo Autonomous Prefecture
- County-level city: Ruili
- Incorporated (township): 1986

Area
  - Total: 204 km^{2} (79 sq mi)

Population (2016)
  - Total: 8,521
  - Density: 41.8/km^{2} (108/sq mi)
- Time zone: UTC+08:00 (China Standard)
- Postal code: 678602
- Area code: 0692

Huyu Township (simplified Chinese: 户育乡; traditional Chinese: 戶育鄉; pinyin: Hùyù Xiāng; Jingpo: Hu yup or Hi yup) is a township in Ruili, Yunnan, China. As of the 2016 statistics it had a population of 8,521 and an area of 204 square kilometres (79 sq mi).

== Etymology ==
The name of "Huyu" means a place where wild musas grow in Dai language.

== Administrative divisions ==
As of 2016, the township is divided into four villages:

- Huyu (户育村)
- Nongxian (弄贤村)
- Banling (班岭村)
- Leinong (雷弄村)

== History ==
In 1956, the Government of Ruili County set up the Huyu Production and Culture Station to maintain control of the region. During the Cultural Revolution, it was renamed "Huyu People's Commune" and then "Dongfeng People's Commune" (东风公社). It was incorporated as a township in 1986.

== Geography ==
The township lies at the northwestern Ruili. To the northwest, the region is bounded by the Namwan River.

The highest point in the town/township is Yingpan Mountain (营盘山) which stands 1,765.5 metres (5,792 ft) above sea level. The lowest point is Tuanjie Groove (团结大沟; 'Unity Groove'), which, at 769 metres (2,523 ft) above sea level.

== Economy ==
The local economy is primarily based upon agriculture. The main crops are rice, rubber, grapefruit, and dendrobium nobile.

The Ruili Huanshan Industrial Park (second-phase project) sits in the township.

== Demographics ==
Population census
Year	Pop.	±%
2016	8,521	—

In 2016, the local population was 8,521, including 2,389 Han (28%) and 4,703 Jingpo (55.2%).

== Transportation ==
The Longling–Ruili Expressway Nongdao Extension Road passes across the township.
