= Hekou Border Economic Cooperation Zone =

Hekou Border Economic Cooperation Zone (HKBECZ) is a Chinese State Council-approved Industrial Park based in Hekou County, Honghe Prefecture, Yunnan, China, founded in 1993 and was established to promote trade between China and Vietnam. Transport links with Ho Chi Minh City and Hanoi, Vietnam include:

- Rail: Yunnan–Vietnam Railway
- Road: Kunming-Hanoi Highway
- Waterway: Red River (Asia)

Sino-Vietnamese business is growing fast, especially in recent years. In 1999, total foreign trade of Sino-Vietnam businesses amounted to US$72.21 million while border trade was US$45.94 million.

Main export products include clothing, cotton yarn, ceresin wax, mechanical equipment, batteries, fruits, rice seeds and tobacco.

The Vietnamese government fully endorses Sino-Vietnam border trade. With effect from 15 January 1999, import and export had been catalogued in accordance with the international tax rate. Also, three kinds of products, namely, rubber, coal and marine, are exported with zero tax rates. Since March 1999, the government has encouraged more trade channels and more types of products for trade.

== See also ==
- Sino-Vietnamese relations
- Kunming Economic and Technology Development Zone
- Kunming High-tech Industrial Development Zone
- Ruili Border Economic Cooperation Zone
- Wanding Border Economic Cooperation Zone
