= Dianhong =

Type of Chinese black tea

Dianhong tea 滇紅茶
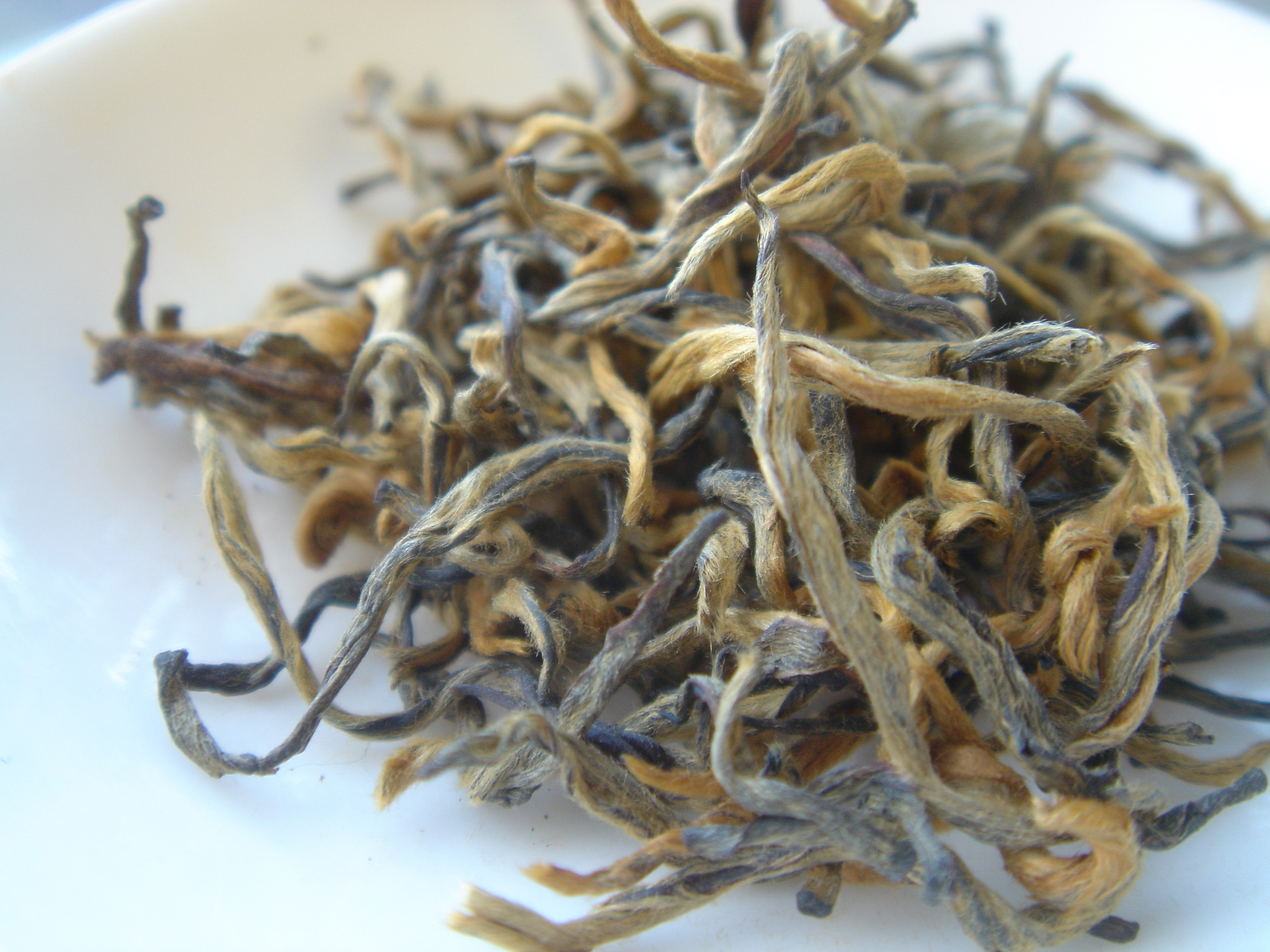
- Type: Black
- Other names: Yunnan tea Yunnan black tea Yunnan Black tea
- Origin: Yunnan Province, China
- Quick description: Robust and malty, some types are very fine while others are used for blending. High quality leaves are uniformly covered in golden-orange bud hairs.

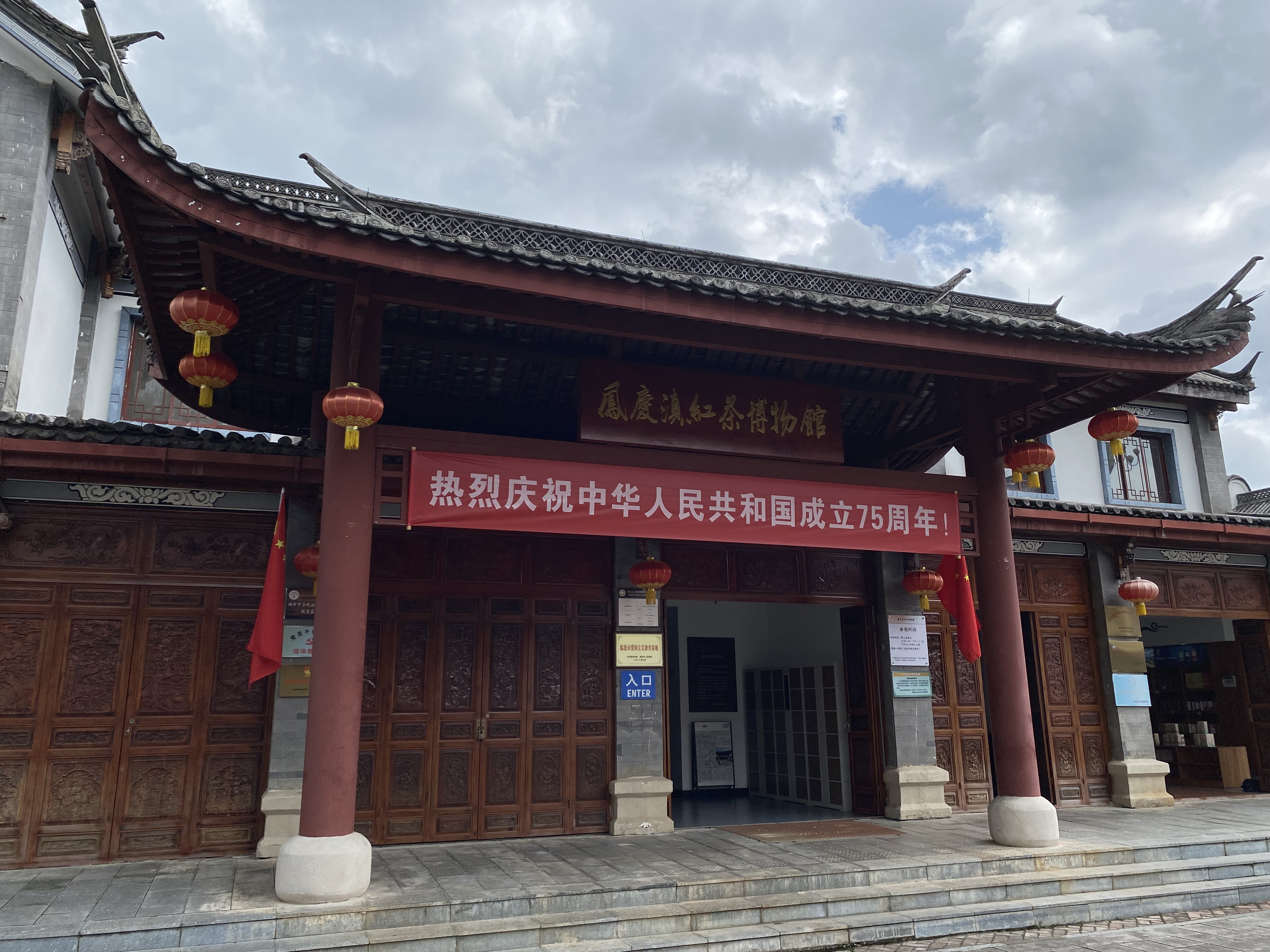
Fengqing Dianhong Museum

Dianhong tea (Chinese: 滇紅茶; pinyin: Diān hóng chá; lit. 'Yunnan black tea'; pronounced [tjɛ́n xʊ̌ŋ ʈʂʰǎ]) is a type of relatively high-end, gourmet Chinese black tea sometimes used in various tea blends and grown in Yunnan Province, China. The main difference between Dianhong and other Chinese black teas is the amount of fine leaf buds, or "golden tips," present in the dried tea. Dianhong tea produces a brew that is brassy golden orange in colour with a sweet, gentle aroma and no astringency. Cheaper varieties of Dianhong produce a darker brownish brew that can be very bitter.

== History and etymology ==
Teas grown in Yunnan prior to the Han dynasty (206 BCE – 220 CE) were typically produced in a compressed form similar to modern pu'er tea. Dian hong is a relatively new product from Yunnan that began production in the early 20th century. The word diān (滇) is the short name for the Yunnan region while hóng (紅) means "red (tea)"; as such, these teas are sometimes simply referred to as Yunnan red or Yunnan black. However, such references are often confusing due to the other varieties of teas produced in Yunnan.

== Varieties ==
- Broken Yunnan (Chinese: 滇紅碎茶; pinyin: diānhóng suì chá): A cheap tea used for blending which contains very few golden buds and is generally bitter on its own. This tea is easily identified by the largely black dried leaves with only a few bursts of golden tips. The brew is dark and not brassy but reddish brown. The taste can sometimes be as strong as cooked pu-erh tea. Classified in Orange pekoe grading as BOP.
- Yunnan Gold (also known as Golden Yunnan) (Chinese: 滇紅工夫茶, 滇紅; pinyin: diānhóng gōngfū chá): A dianhong with fewer golden buds and more dark tea leaves. It is on par with the pure gold, and is priced similarly, but makes teas with slightly different characteristics. The brew has a brassy red color different from other black teas and a vivid sweetness not quite as intense as "Yunnan pure gold". Its rich, malty, earthy and slightly sweet flavour profile, often with hints of chocolate, honey, and a subtle spice make it sought after amongst tea connoisseurs. Classified in Orange pekoe grading from OP to TGFOP.
- Yunnan Pure Gold (Chinese: 金芽滇紅茶; pinyin: jīnyá diānhóng chá): Considered the best type of Dian hong tea. It contains only golden tips, which are usually covered in fine hairs. When viewed from a distance, the dried tea appears bright orange in colour. The tea liquor is bright red in colour and exhibits a gentle aroma and a sweet taste. The leaves are reddish brown after being brewed. Classified in Orange pekoe grading from TGFOP to SFTGFOP.
- Golden needle (Chinese: 金针茶; pinyin: jīnzhēn chá) is a pure black variety of dianhong. The leaves are golden in color and yield an amberish infusion.
- Pine Needle (Chinese: 松针滇红; pinyin: sōngzhēn diānhóng) is a preparation technology developed in the 20th century preserving straight leaf form, which makes a mix of differently coloured leaves reminiscent of old needles fallen off a pine tree. Non-curved leaves are a rather common shape for lightly fermented green teas, however for black teas this is a novelty.
- Yunnan Golden Snail (Chinese: 滇红金螺; pinyin: diānhóng jīnluó) is a variety rolled into coils.

== See also ==
- Golden Monkey tea
- Keemun tea
- Pu'er tea, another variety of tea commonly produced in Yunnan
