= Jiexiang =

Jiexiang Town 姐相镇
- Town
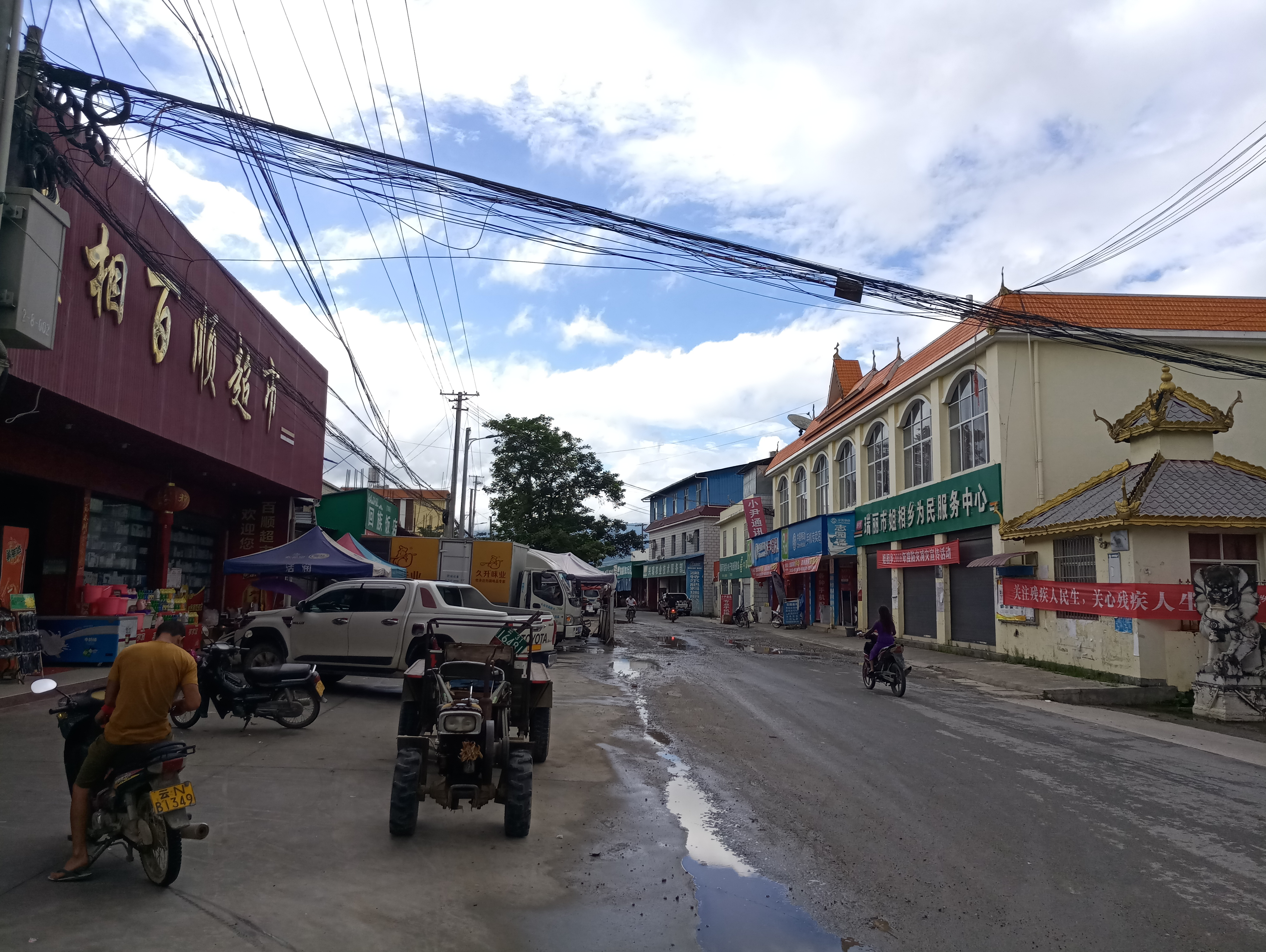
- Residential buildings in Jiexiang Town

- Jiexiang Town in Ruili

- Location in Yunnan.
- Coordinates: 23°55′04″N 97°44′57″E
- Country: People's Republic of China
- Province: Yunnan
- Autonomous prefecture: Dehong Dai and Jingpo Autonomous Prefecture
- County-level city: Ruili
- Founded: 2021

Area
  - Total: 64 km^{2} (25 sq mi)
- Elevation: 752.2 m (2,468 ft)

Population (2016)
  - Total: 17,836
  - Density: 280/km^{2} (720/sq mi)
- Time zone: UTC+08:00 (China Standard)
- Postal code: 678602
- Area code: 0692

Jiexiang (simplified Chinese: 姐相镇; traditional Chinese: 姐相鎮; pinyin: Jiěxiàng Zhèn; Tai Nüa: ᥓᥥ ᥔᥦᥒᥴ) is a town in Ruili, Yunnan, China. As of the 2016 statistics it had a population of 17,836 and an area of 64 square kilometres (25 sq mi).

== Etymology ==
The name of "Jiexiang" means gem street in Dai language.

== Administrative divisions ==
As of 2021, the town is divided into four villages:

- Hesai (贺腮村)
- Shunha (顺哈村)
- Nuanbo (暖波村)
- Eluo (俄罗村)

== History ==
After the establishment of the Communist State, in February 1955, Jiexiang District (姐相区) came under the jurisdiction of the 3rd District of Ruili County. It was renamed "Jiedong People's Commune" (姐东公社) in October 1958 and reverted to its former name of Jiexiang District in 1960. During the Cultural Revolution, its name was changed to "Xiangyang People's Commune" (向阳公社). It was incorporated as a township in 1986. In 2021, it was recognized as "a famous tourist town" in Yunnan by the Yunnan Provincial Department of Culture and Tourism. Yunnan provincial government approve revoking Jiexiang Township and establish Jiexiang Town on 11 August 2021.

== Geography ==
The town is located in the southeastern Ruili and borders Myanmar in the southeast.

The Shweli River flows through the town.

== Economy ==
The town's main industries is agriculture. The main crops are vegetables, tobacco, rubber, grapefruit, and dendrobium nobile.

The Ruili Huanshan Industrial Park sits in the town.

== Demographics ==
Population census
Year	Pop.	±%
2016	17,836	—

In 2016, the local population was 17,836, including 1,642 Han (9.2%) and 16,106 Dai (91.3%).

== Tourist attractions ==
The main attractions are the Mangyue Temple, Denghannong Temple, and the scenic spot of "one village, two countries".

== Transportation ==
The town is the termination of China National Highway 556.
