= Wanding Border Economic Cooperation Zone =

Coordinates: 24°05′00″N 98°04′00″E

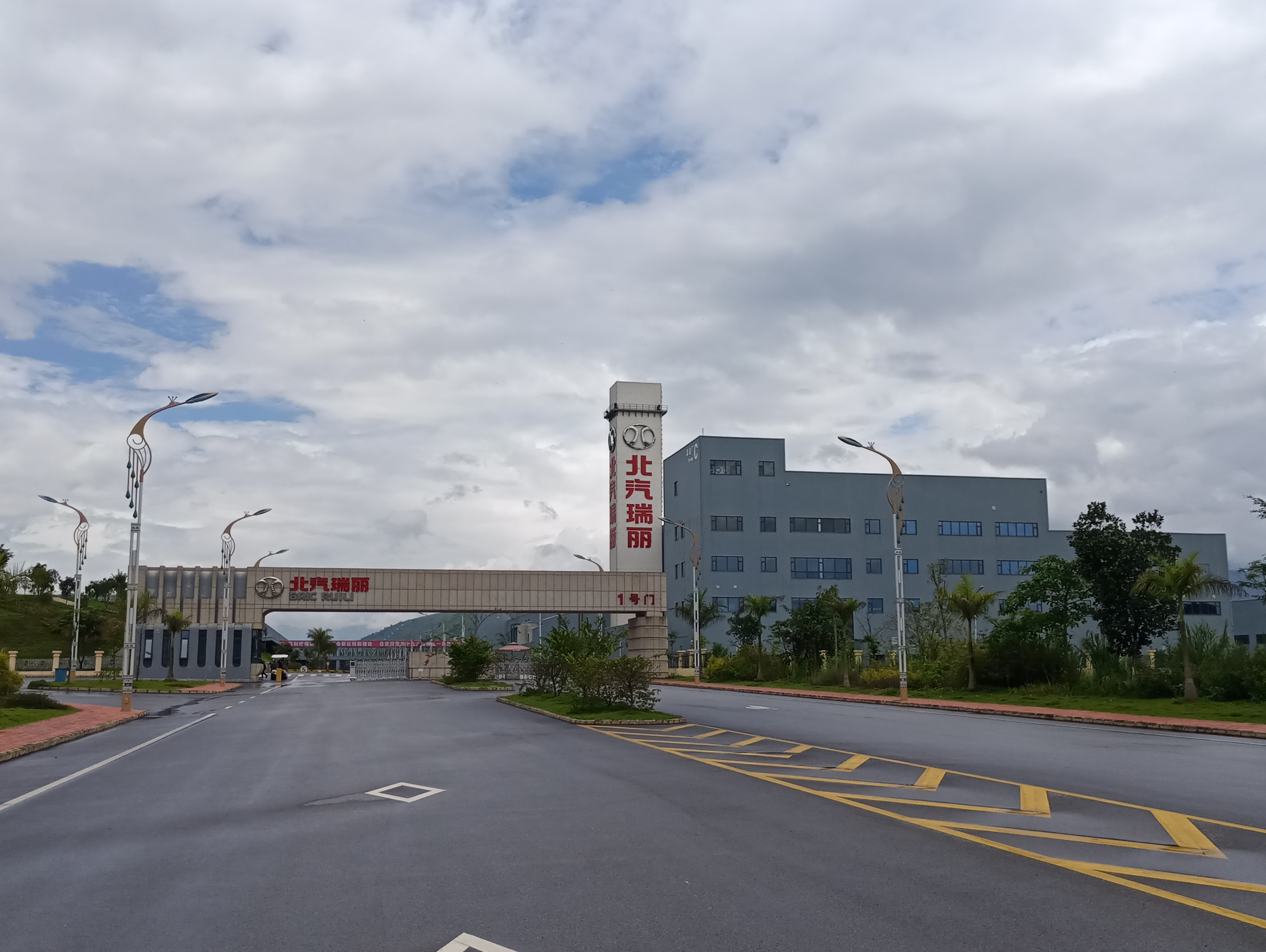
BAIC Ruili, A car factory in the cooperation zone

Wanding Border Economic Cooperation Zone (WTBECZ) is a Chinese State Council-approved Industrial Park based in Wanding Town, Ruili City, Dehong Prefecture, Yunnan, China, founded in 1992 and was established to promote trade between China and Myanmar. The zone spans 6 km sq. and is focused on developing trading, processing, agriculture resources and tourism.

== See also ==
- Sino-Burmese relations
- Kunming Economic and Technology Development Zone
- Kunming High-tech Industrial Development Zone
- Hekou Border Economic Cooperation Zone
- Ruili Border Economic Cooperation Zone
