= Ruili Border Economic Cooperation Zone =

Ruili Border Economic Cooperation Zone (RLBECZ) is a Chinese State Council-approved Industrial Park based in Ruili City, Dehong Prefecture, Yunnan, China, founded in 1992 and was established to promote trade between China and Myanmar.

The cooperation zone was located between Ruili urban and Jiegao, with a planning area of 13.45 km^{2}. But in 2013, the Ruili city government moved the cooperation zone to Nongdao town, and expand the planning area to 51.45 km^{2}.

== See also ==
- Sino-Burmese relations
- Kunming Economic and Technology Development Zone
- Kunming High-tech Industrial Development Zone
- Hekou Border Economic Cooperation Zone
- Wanding Border Economic Cooperation Zone
