= Golden Monkey (disambiguation) =

Golden Monkey may refer to:

- Golden monkey, a species of Old World monkey found in the Virunga volcanic mountains of Central Africa.
- Golden snub-nosed monkey, an Old World monkey in the Colobinae subfamily, endemic to a small area in temperate, mountainous forests of central and south-western China. The Chinese name is Sichuan Golden Hair Monkey (川金丝猴).
- Golden Monkey Tea, the name of a black tea originating from the Fujian and Yunnan provinces in China.
