= Jiegao =

Border trade zone in southern China near the border with Myanmar

Coordinates: 23°58′50″N 97°53′20″E

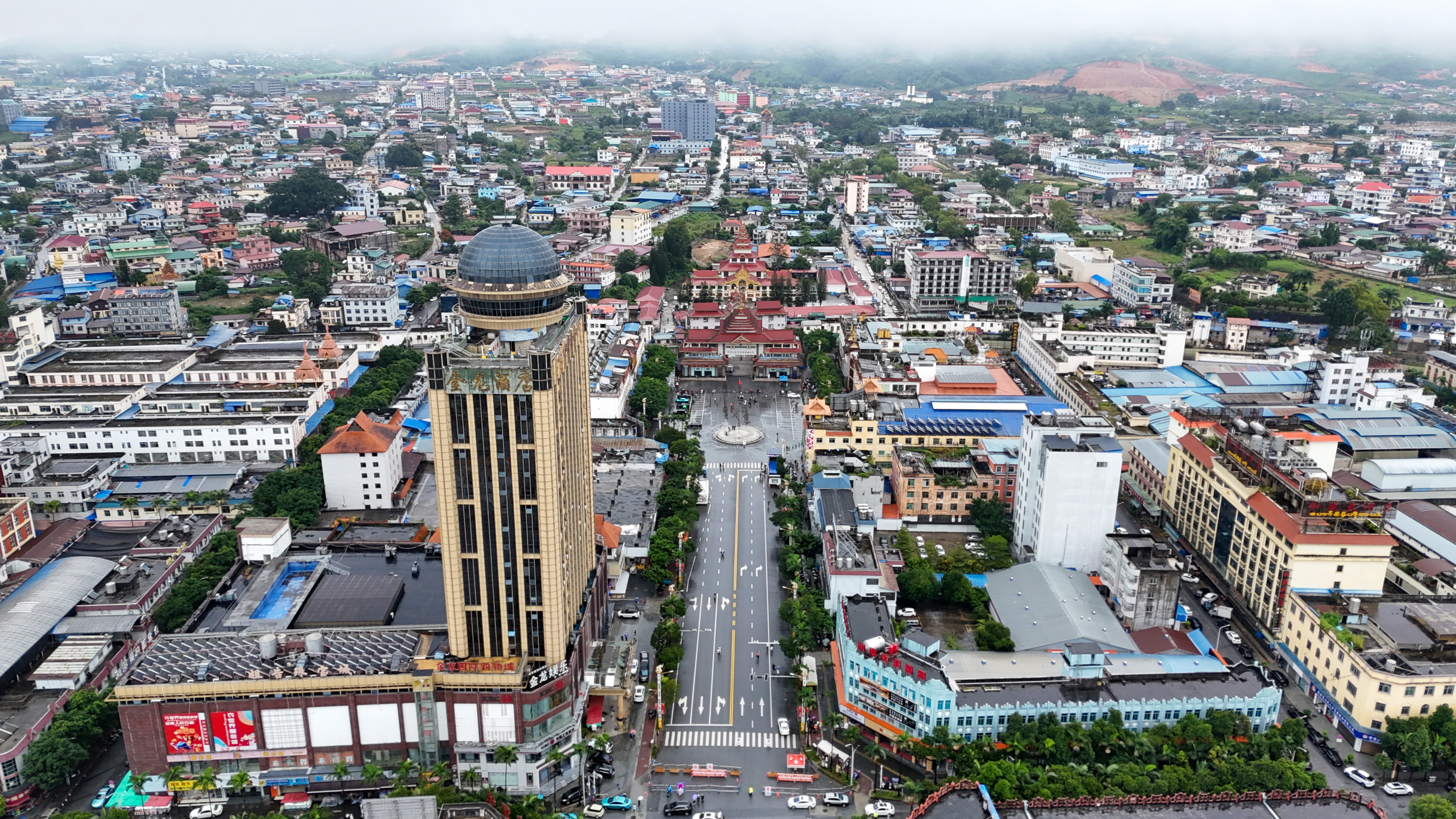
Aerial view of Jiegao

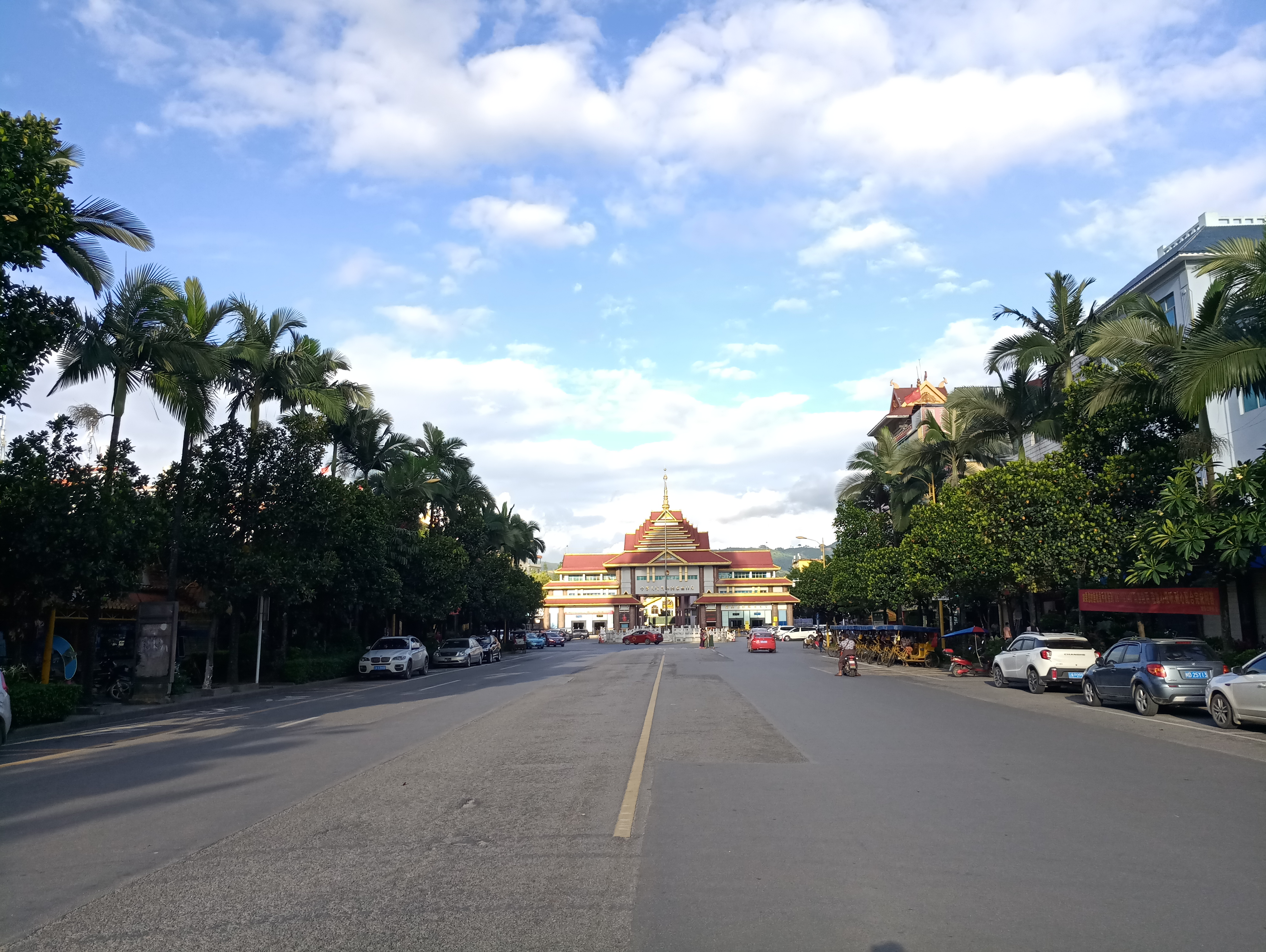
The "national gate avenue" in Jiegao

Jiegao (Chinese: 姐告; pinyin: Jiěgào; Tai Nüa: ᥓᥥ ᥐᥝᥱ) is a border trade zone in southern China near the border with Myanmar. It is located 6 kilometres (3.7 mi) southeast of Ruili and is part of Yunnan province.

== Geography ==
Jiegao is located on the east bank of the Shweli River, surrounded by Burmese land.

The Jiegao border trade zone has a total area of 2.4 square kilometers and a land area of 1.92 square kilometers. Across the river is the city of Ruili and adjacent to Muse, Myanmar, from which it is less than 500 meters, being surrounded by Myanmar territory to the east, south and north. The Chinese national border is 4.18 kilometers long and has 9 boundary markers. It has four entry and exit routes (National Gate, Xiaoguo Gate, Yard Goods Gate and Binjiang).

== History ==
Jiegao was founded as a provincial-level border trade zone in 1991, and updated to a national-level border trade zone in 2000. The trade zone implements a special mode called "out of customs but in the border", which means the customs station is located at the west end of bridge, but the Jiegao is located at the east. Exporting goods that cross the customs station to Jiegao is an export, and imported goods are exempt from declaration to the customs in the Jiegao trade zone.

== Transport ==
Jiegao is the end of China National Highway 320.
