= Dian Hong Jin Luo =

Type of Chinese black tea

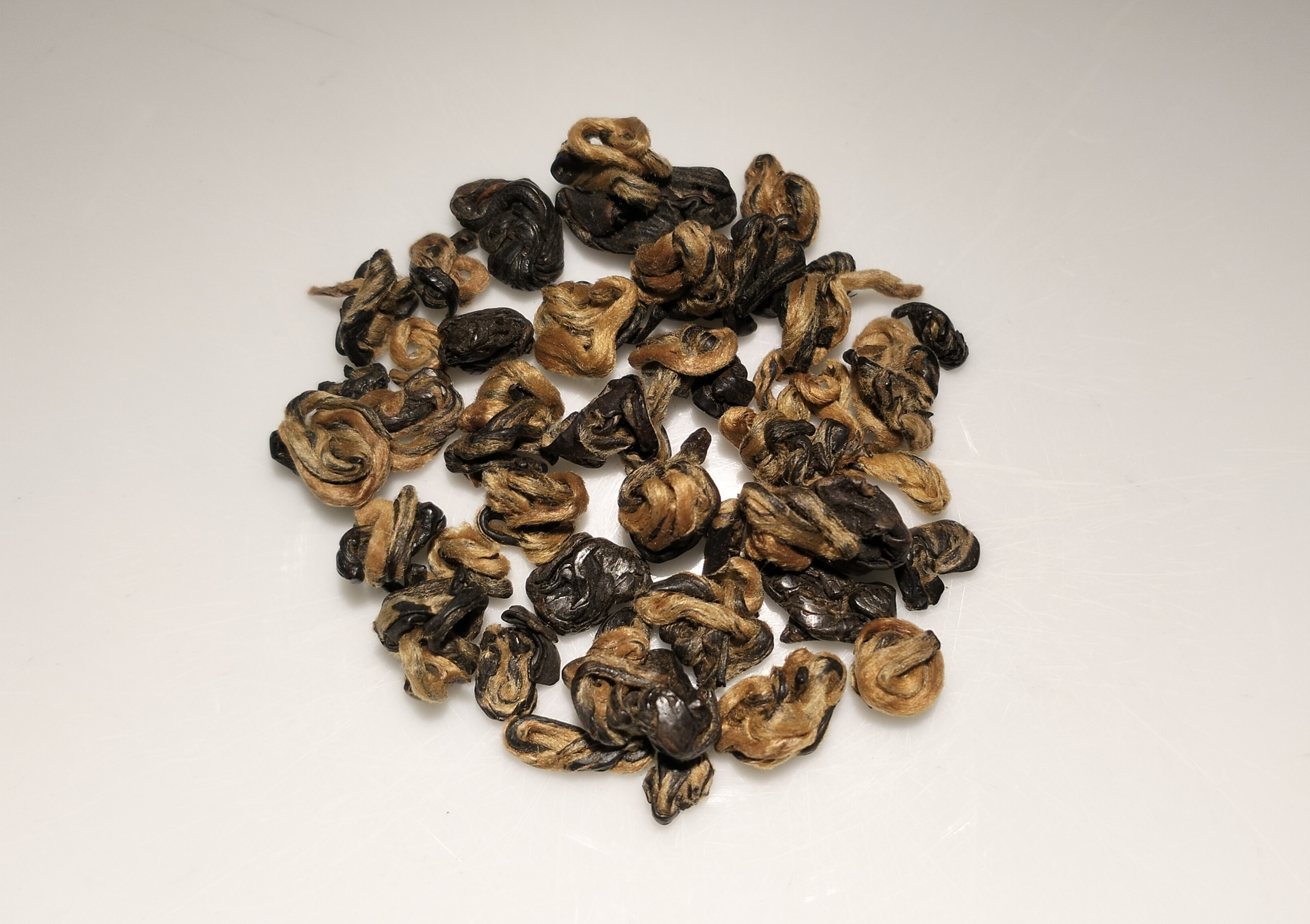
- Type: Black
- Origin: Yunnan, China
- Quick description: Sweet and fruity. Leaves rolled into coils are covered in golden bud hairs.
- Temperature: 95 to 100 °C (203 to 212 °F)
- Time: 3–5 minutes

Chinese name
- Traditional Chinese: 滇紅金螺
- Simplified Chinese: 滇红金螺
- Literal meaning: "Yunnan Golden Snail black tea"
Transcriptions
Standard Mandarin
- Hanyu Pinyin: diānhóng jīnluó

Dian Hong Jin Luo (Chinese: 滇红金螺) is a type of Dianhong black tea that is known for its distinctive flavor and aroma. This tea is baked in Yunnan, China.

== Origin ==
Dian Hong Jin Luo tea is produced in the Simao, Pu'er, located in the southwest of Yunnan province, which is famous for its high-quality tea products. The name "Jin Luo" means "Golden Snail" and it comes from the shape of the twisted tea leaves, which resembles a stiffened snail.

== Production ==
Dian Hong Jin Luo Golden Snail King is made from the hand-picked buds of the Yunnan Da Ye Large Leaf (雲南大叶) variety, which is also used to make numerous Pu'ers in the region. During the production process, the leaves are rolled by hand into small coils or snails. Since it is a pure bud tea, the snails have a golden color.

== Taste ==
After brewing, Dian Hong Jin Luo tea has an amber hue. It has a profile of sweet honey flavor with a smooth texture. The tea is balanced by a light fruity aroma that leaves a pleasant, long-lasting aftertaste.

== Brewing ==
Manufacturers recommend to use soft purified water heated to a temperature of 95–100 °C to make this tea. One teaspoon of dry tea is used (with a small slide) for every 250–300 ml of volume of a cup or other brewing vessel. Water is poured over the tea and left to steep for 3–5 minutes. Pouring the tea into another vessel after this time softens the astringency and bitterness.
