= Namwan River =

Namwan River 南宛河
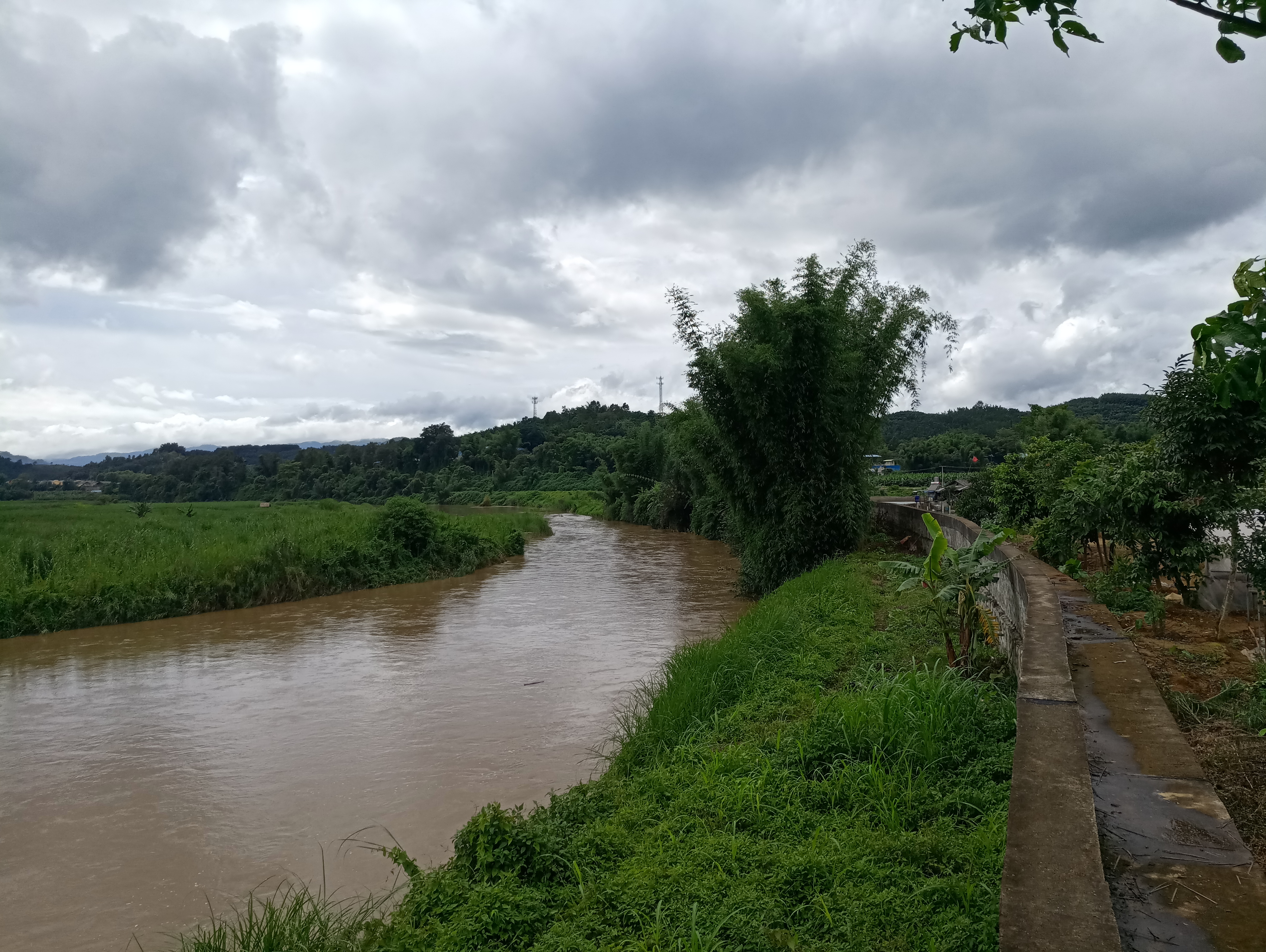
- Namwan River at Nongdao, Ruili. On the left bank is Myanmar.

Physical characteristics
- Source
  - location: Huguo Township, Longchuan County, Dehong
  - elevation: 2,520 m
- Mouth
  - location: Nongdao Town, Ruili City, Dehong
  - coordinates: 23°50′39″N 97°38′40″E
  - elevation: 743 m
- Length: 148.5 km
- Basin size: 1,439 km^{2}
- Discharge
  - average: 11.3 m^{3}/s (Maliba hydrological station at Chengzi, Longchuan)

Basin features
- River system: Irrawaddy River
- Population: 132,000 (2004)

Namwan River (Chinese: 南宛河; Tai Nüa: ᥘᥛᥳ ᥝᥢᥰ) is a river in China and Myanmar. Namwan River rises in the mountain called Ganya Liangzi at the northern section of Longchuan County, Yunnan. It travels through the Longchuan county, as the major irrigation water source of the fields in the basin, enters the valley at the southwest of Zhangfeng, the county town of Longchuan. It ends as it merges with the Shweli River at Nongdao, Ruili.. It serves as a boundary between Myanmar and China.

== See also ==
- Namwan Assigned Tract
