= Ruili Botanical Garden =

Botanical garden in China

- Interactive map of Ruili Botanical Garden
- Type: Botanical garden
- Location: Ruili, Yunnan, China
- Nearest city: Ruili
- Coordinates: 24.0736°N 97.8208°E
- Area: 5,000 acres (2,000 ha)
- Created: 2002
- Owner: Ruili Forestry Bureau
- Status: Open all year
- Species: 1,200

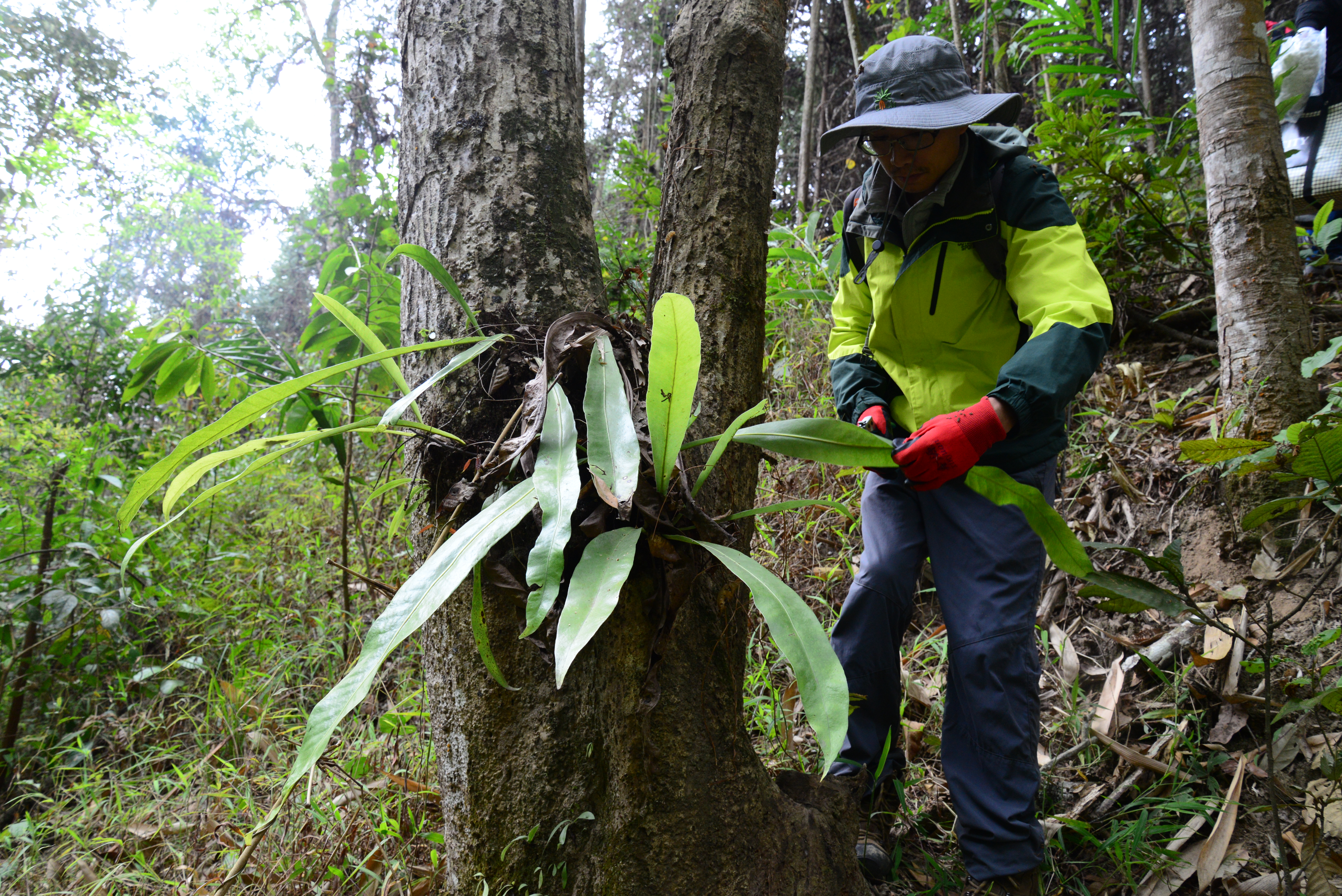
Dr Huan Liu collecting specimens in Ruili Botanical Garden for the genomic work going on at China National GeneBank.

Founded in 2002, Ruili Botanical Garden (Chinese: 瑞丽植物园) and Nanmaohu Park is a botanical garden in Ruili. Located 6 km from the city in Dehong Dai and Jingpo Autonomous Prefecture of Yunnan in the South-West of China near the Myanmar border. The park has more than 5,000 acres (2,000 ha) of well-preserved native vegetation, mainly monsoon evergreen broad-leaved forest, with more than 1,200 species of tropical and subtropical plants.

== Research ==
Working with China National GeneBank, BGI and the Forestry Bureau of Ruili, the Botanical Garden is carrying out the Digitalization of Ruili Botanic Garden project, committed to protecting endangered and Chinese endemic plants, by collection, long-term preservation and breeding of germplasm resources. Moreover, the project will carry out the world's very first comprehensive digitalization and in-depth bioinformatics analysis of a botanical garden. Providing insight into the feasibility and technical requirements for "planetary scale" sequencing projects such as the Earth BioGenome Project (EBP) and 10,000 Plant Genome (10KP) Projects. So far 689 species and 761 specimens have been sequenced with an average depth of 60X to produce 54 Tb of raw sequencing data, and analysis and further sampling is ongoing.
