= Zhefang =

Zhefang Town 遮放镇
- Town
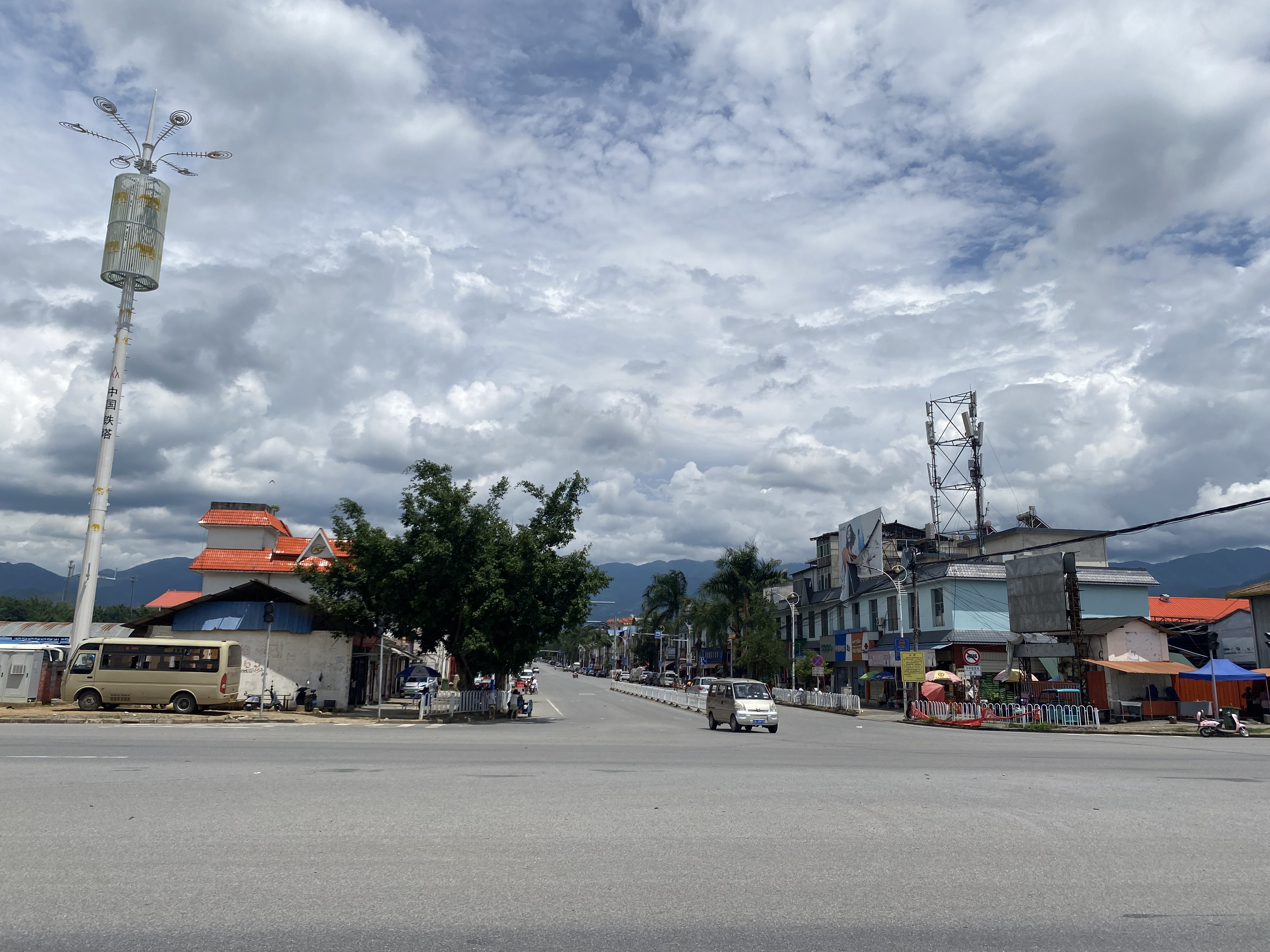
- Streets in Zhefang

- Location of the town region in Mangshi

- Location in Yunnan
- Coordinates: 24.259082°N 98.282611°E
- Country: People's Republic of China
- Province: Yunnan
- Prefecture-level city: Dehong Dai and Jingpo Autonomous Prefecture
- County-level city: Mangshi

Area
  - Total: 422 km^{2} (163 sq mi)

Population (2017)
  - Total: 49,000
  - Density: 120/km^{2} (300/sq mi)
- Time zone: UTC+08:00 (China Standard)
- Postal code: 678411
- Area code: 0692

Zhefang (simplified Chinese: 遮放镇; traditional Chinese: 遮放鎮; pinyin: Zhēfàng Zhèn) is a town in Mangshi, Yunnan, China. As of the 2017 census it had a population of 49,000 and an area of 422 square kilometres (163 sq mi). The town is bordered to the north by Xishan Township, to the east by Santaishan Town and Mengga Town, to the south by Manghai Town and Myanmar, and to the west by Ruili.

== Administrative divisions ==
As of December 2015, the town is divided into 13 villages:

- Jiedao (街道村)
- Humen (户闷村)
- Hunong (户弄村)
- Nongxi (弄喜村)
- Hula (户拉村)
- Zhemao (遮冒村)
- Nongkan (弄坎村)
- Gazhong (戛中村)
- Hebianzhai (河边寨村)
- Nongqiu (弄丘村)
- Wengjiao (翁角村)
- Gongling (拱岭村)
- Bangda (邦达村)

== History ==
During the Republic of China (1912-1949), it was known as "Qinglong Town" (青龙镇; 'Green Dragon Town').

After the founding of the Communist State in 1953, "Zhefang District" was set up.

In 1958 it was renamed "Zhefang Commune" and then "Qianwei Commune" (前卫公社) in the following year.

In 1988, it was upgraded to a town.

In 2005, former Dongshan Township (东山乡) was merged into the town.

== Geography ==
The Longchuan River (龙川江) and Mangshi River (芒市大河) flow through the town.

The average elevation of the town is 1,160-metre (3,810 ft).

It belongs to the south subtropical monsoon climate, with an average annual temperature of 19.8 °C (67.6 °F), annual sunshine of 2000 to 2452 hours, frost-free period of more than 300 days, and annual average rainfall of 1,300-millimetre (51 in) to 1,653-millimetre (65.1 in).

== Economy ==
The economy is supported primarily by agriculture and tourism.

The rice in the town is very famous. It used to be a royal tribute.

== Education ==
- Zhefang Central Primary School

== Transport ==
The National Highway G320 passes across the town.

== Attractions ==
Mangbang Yaochi Hot Spring (芒棒瑶池温泉) is a famous tourist and leisure attraction.

Dongshangyun (洞尚允), also known as "Mangbing Pagoda" (芒丙佛塔), was originally built in early 17th-century and completely destroyed in the Cultural Revolution. The present version was rebuilt in 1985.
