= Golden Monkey tea =

Chinese black tea

Golden Monkey tea (Chinese: 金猴茶; pinyin: jīn hóu chá) is a black tea originating from the Fujian and Yunnan provinces in China. Only the bud and first leaf are picked, and the tea leaves are characterized by the pale gold threading. Golden Monkey tea is a black tea counterpart of Silver Needle white tea. The flavor profile of golden monkey tea is characterized by light, honeyed peach notes, and its lack of astringency. The name "Golden Monkey" can be used for many black teas. For determining particular flavour components, it is suggested to observe the leaf and try a sample. This tea is highly prized, as evidenced by its second-place finish in the Signature Famous Teas – Hot Tea Class of the 2009 World Tea Championship.

This tea is hand-processed each spring by carefully plucking its leaves and buds. It is considered one of the finest black teas available. The name of the tea comes from the leaves that resemble monkey claws. Golden Monkey leaves are grown at the altitudes of 1200 metres. This tea comes from the Yunnan province; a mountainous, cloudy and misty province. It has grown tea for 1700 years. During ancient times, Golden Monkey was consumed by local landlords and Taipans. Due to the rarity of the tea, the Taipans believed that it had special powers. The Taipans claimed that it provided them with agility and sexual powers.

Despite the fact that tea has been grown in Yunnan for 1700 years, Golden Monkey is a relatively new tea, about 300 years old. It has only been produced for export in the last 13–18 years.
