= Shweli River =

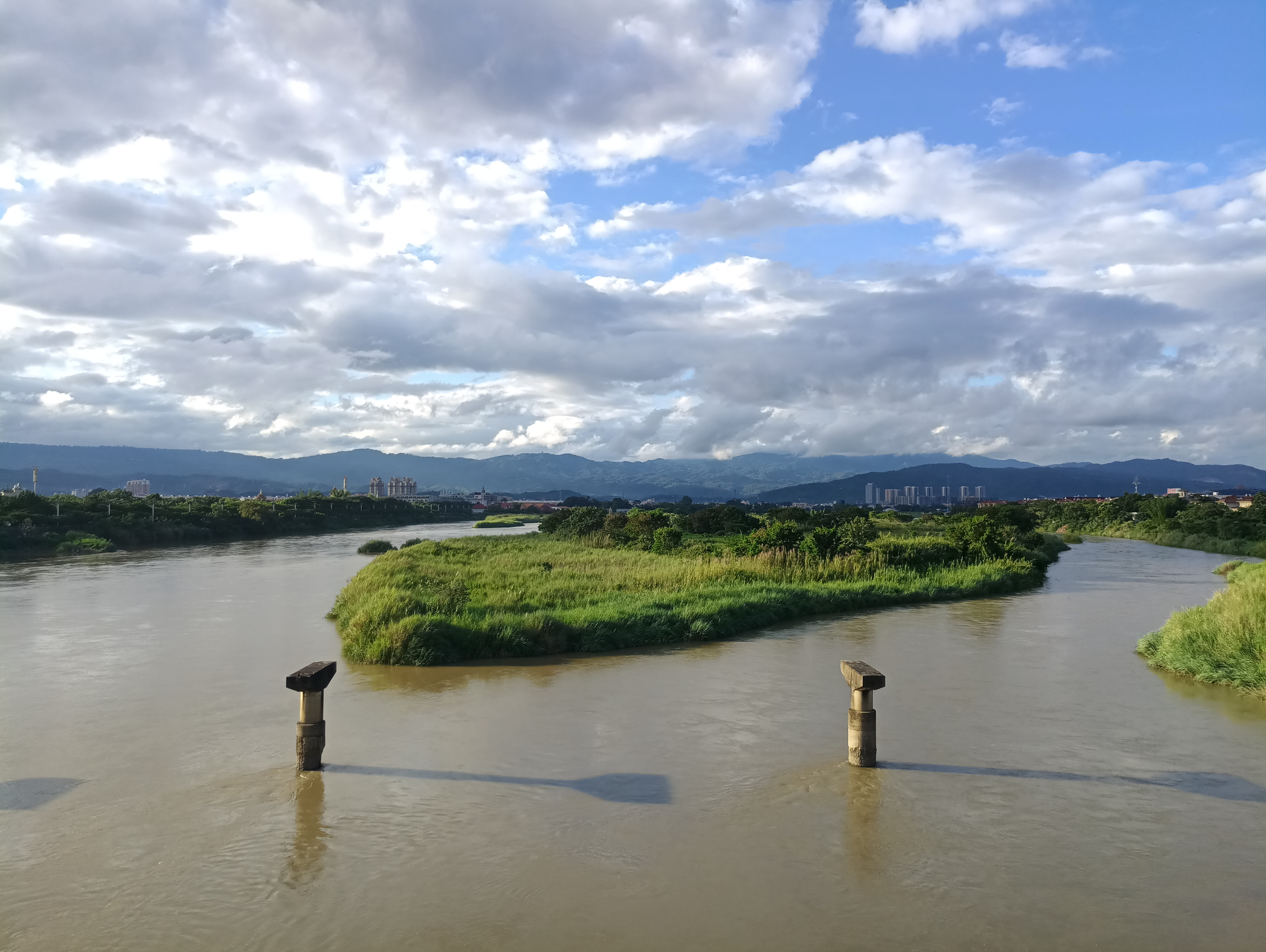
- Shweli River at Jiegao, Ruili, China

- Shweli river and tributary, with major towns in basin and hydroelectric power stations in China & Myanmar and the hydrological stations in China.
- Native name: 瑞丽江 (Chinese); ရွှေလီမြစ် (Burmese); ၼမ်ႉမၢဝ်း (Shan); ᥘᥛᥳ ᥛᥣᥝᥰ (Tai Nüa)

Location
- Country: China, Myanmar

Physical characteristics
- Source
  - location: Gaoligong Mountains at Mingguang Town, Tengchong
  - elevation: 2,520 m (8,270 ft)
- Mouth
  - location: Ayeyarwady River by Inywa
  - coordinates: 23°56′49″N 96°17′0″E
  - elevation: 89 m (292 ft)
- Length: 630 km (390 mi)
- Basin size: 22,908.3 km^{2} (8,844.9 sq mi)
- Discharge
  - location: Near mouth
  - average: 1,020.2 m^{3}/s (36,030 cu ft/s)

Basin features
- Tributaries
  - left: Mangshi River, Wanding River, Namba River
  - right: Luoboba River, Namwan River

Shweli River (Burmese: ရွှေလီမြစ်; Chinese: 瑞丽江) is a river in China and Myanmar (Burma), also known as the Nam Mao (Shan: ၼမ်ႉမၢဝ်း; Tai Nüa: ᥘᥛᥳ ᥛᥣᥝᥰ) in Shan or Dai, and Ruili River in Chinese. The middle and upper reaches of the river are called the Longchuan River (龙川江) or Long River (龙江) in Chinese, or the Nam Yang (Tai Nüa: ᥘᥛᥳ ᥕᥣᥒᥰ) in Dai. The river forms 26 km of the boundary between Burma and China, and it is one of the tributaries of Myanmar's chief river, the Ayeyarwady, and originates in Yunnan Province of China. It flows through northern Shan state and Sagaing Division, and enters the Ayeyarwady at Inywa, 60 kilometres (37 mi) north of Tagaung and south of Katha.

== History ==
Dai people, known as Shan in Burma, migrated from Yunnan into Burma along the Shweli. Maw Shans from Mong Mao settled in the Shweli valley, and raided and invaded the Bamar heartlands down the Shweli, some people believe that King Anawrahta of Bagan (1044–1077) reduced Mong Mao to a vassal state. But the event is that when the Anawrahta visited Nanzhao in quest of the Buddha's tooth while returning, married Sao-Môn-la, a daughter of the Mong Mao king. But there is nothing to show that the Mong Mao king ever had to acknowledge the overlordship of the Pagan monarch. The fall of the kingdom of Bagan in the 13th century, however, saw a resurgence of Shan power, although King Bayinnaung (1551–1581) of the Taungoo Dynasty succeeded in pacifying them to establish Burmese suzerainty once and for all. King Hsinbyushin (1763–1776) of the Konbaung Dynasty also successfully resisted Chinese army in Sino-Burmese War (1765-9) that advanced down the Shweli and Myitnge river valleys.

The territory south of the Shweli, about 500–600 square kilometres (190–230 sq mi), north of Namtu and from Namkham to the west, was under the control of the Communist Party of Burma (CPB) from 1968 to 1986. The Kachin Independence Army (KIA) controlled the area north of the Shweli, and the Shan State Army (SSA) and the Palaung State Liberation Army (PSLA) farther south. The Shweli river valley and the hills around Momeik (Mong Mit) and Mogok with its ruby mines had been old CPB strongholds since the 1950s. Momeik itself was captured by the Communists in 1977. The Burmese Army recaptured the territory in early 1987, and subsequently opened up border trade with China.

The Shweli River is often used by Burmese drug traffickers to evade Chinese border patrols.

== Population ==
The region is inhabited mainly by Shan people, some Kachin and Palaung and a few Chinese.

== Flora and fauna ==
There are extensive marshes along both banks of the Shweli at the confluence with the Ayeyarwady. Hills are covered with broad-leaved species of Terminalia and Shorea trees. Rhododendron edgeworthii, of the finest foliage and flowers ranging in colour from white to white flushed pink or pink, sometimes with a yellow blotch, was part of a collection made in 1997 on the Shweli – Salween divide on the Yunnan border with Burma.

White-winged wood duck (Cairina scutulata), an endangered species of forest duck, and the sarus crane (Grus antigone) are native to the Shweli river. The gharial (Gavialis gangeticus), a crocodilian, was last spotted in 1927. The Irrawaddy dolphin has been known to reach the upper tributaries of the Ayeyarwady including the Shweli.

Based on surveys in 2003 and 2006, a total of 49 species of fish were collected in Shweli river and tributaries in China. By the combination of the investigated species and specimens in the museum of Kunming Institute of Zoology, there are a total of 60 species belonging to 8 orders, 19 families, and 44 genera in Shweli river drainage, among which 16 species are endemic to Irrawaddy drainage and 9 species are alien species. On composition, the species of Cyprinidae are dominant, which have 26 species accounting for 43.3% of the total number of species. In the next place, Sisoridae has 11 species, accounting for 18.3% of the total.

== Towns ==
1. Ruili (Shweli)
2. Muse
3. Namhkam
4. Momeik
5. Mabein

== Trade and commerce ==
Muse is connected to Ruili on the Chinese side, there is a roaring trade in goods and services across the "Gun Bridge", so called because of the armaments transported from China to the military government of Burma. The old bridge was replaced by a new wider one in 2005. Gems especially jade and produce, and illicit heroin, are exported in exchange for cheap motorcycles and household goods from China.

More recently, Chinese hybrid rice called sinn shweli has been introduced by the military authorities to the local farmers as part of the opium eradication drive, most of the crop is to be exported back to China.

The Shweli I Dam was put into operation on the river in 2008. It is the first of three planned dams on the main stem in Myanmar. The upper river in China has abundant hydropower reserves; 18 hydroelectric power stations have been built, mostly in Tengchong. The biggest one in China is Longjiang Dam at Zhefang, Mangshi which became operational in 2010.
