= Ruili =

Ruili 瑞丽市
- County-level city

Other transcription(s)
  - Hanyu pinyin: Ruìlì Shì
  - Tai Nuea: ᥛᥫᥒᥰ ᥛᥣᥝᥰ
  - Jingpho: Shuili Myu
  - Burmese: ရွှေလီမြို့
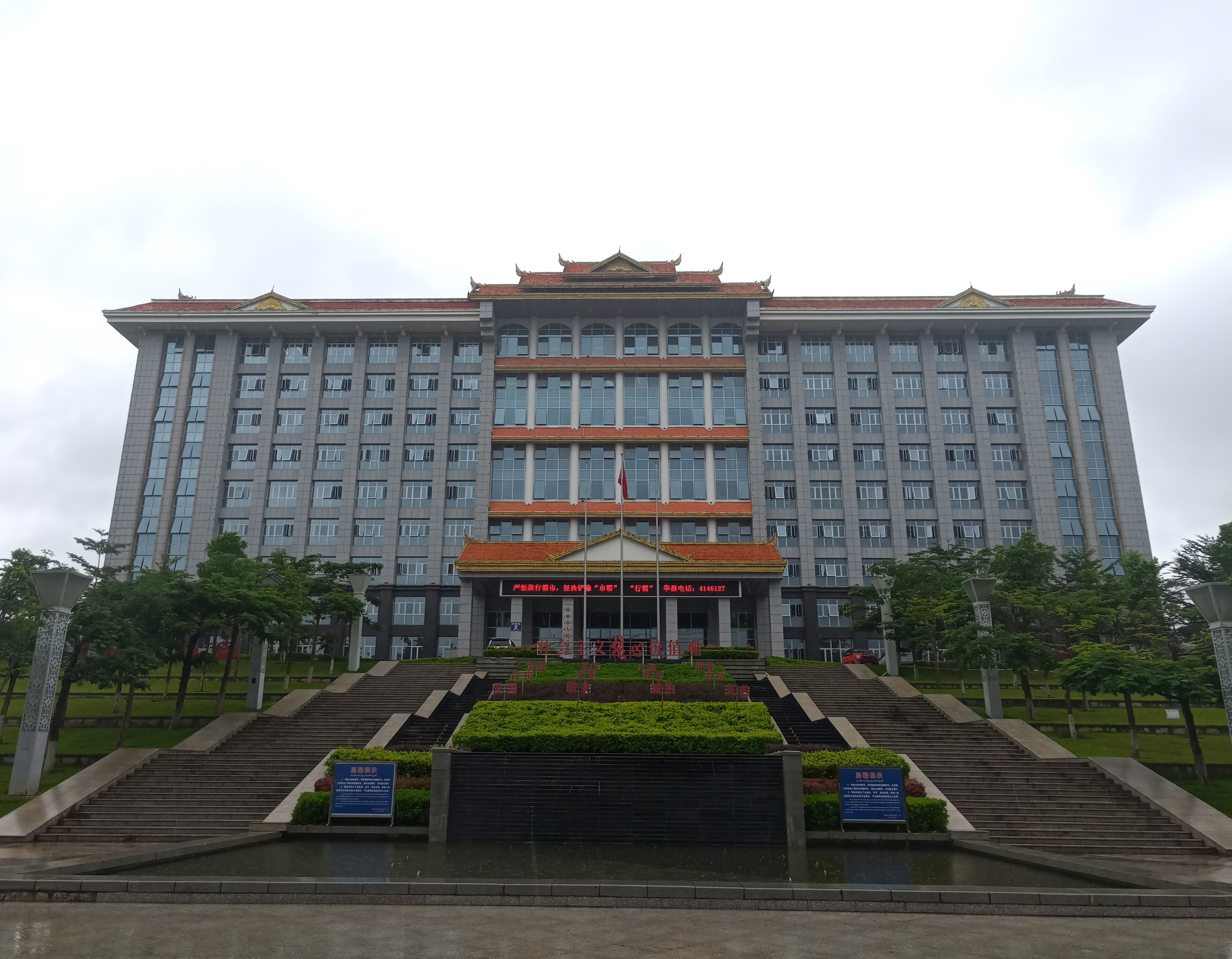
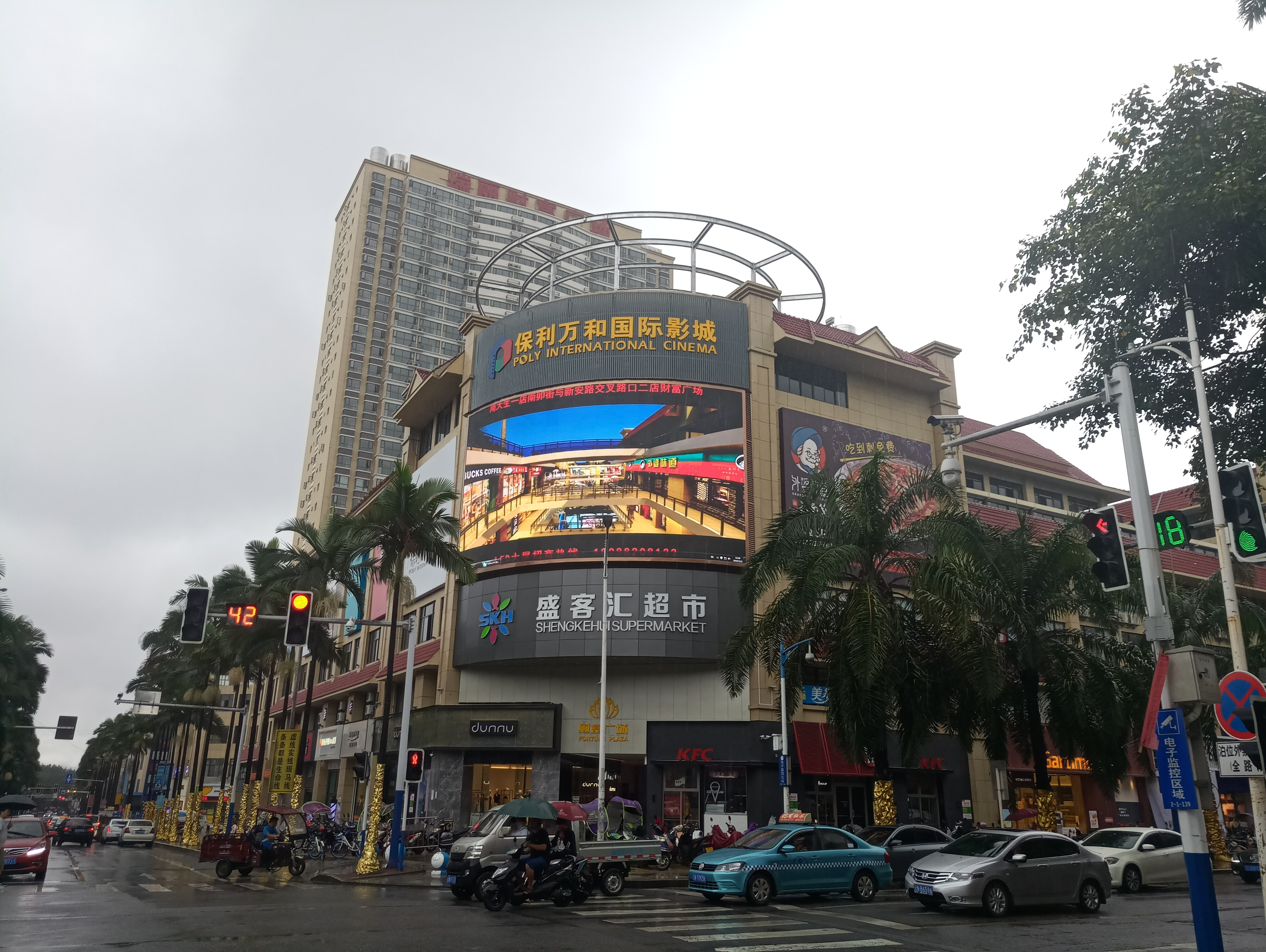
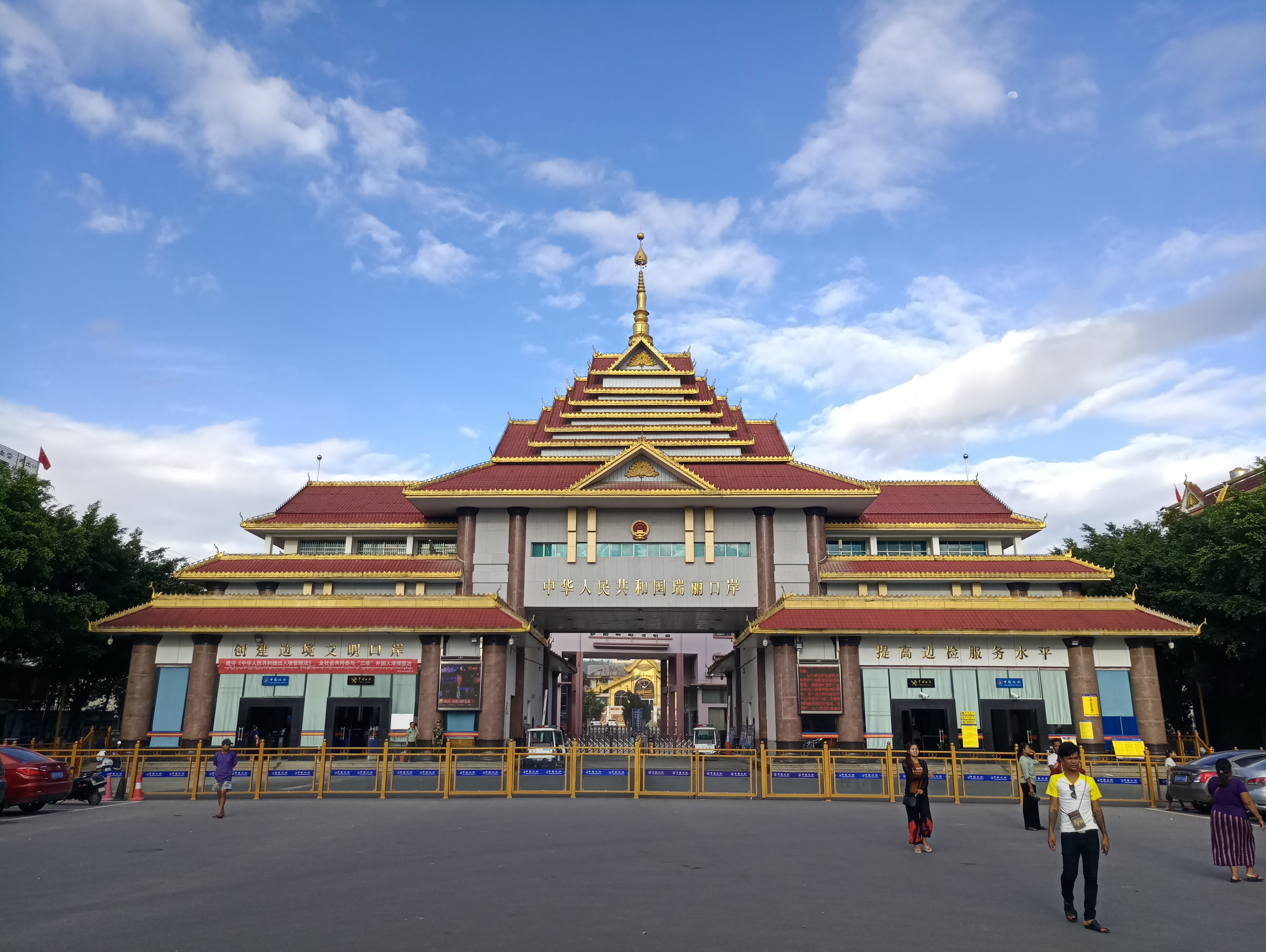
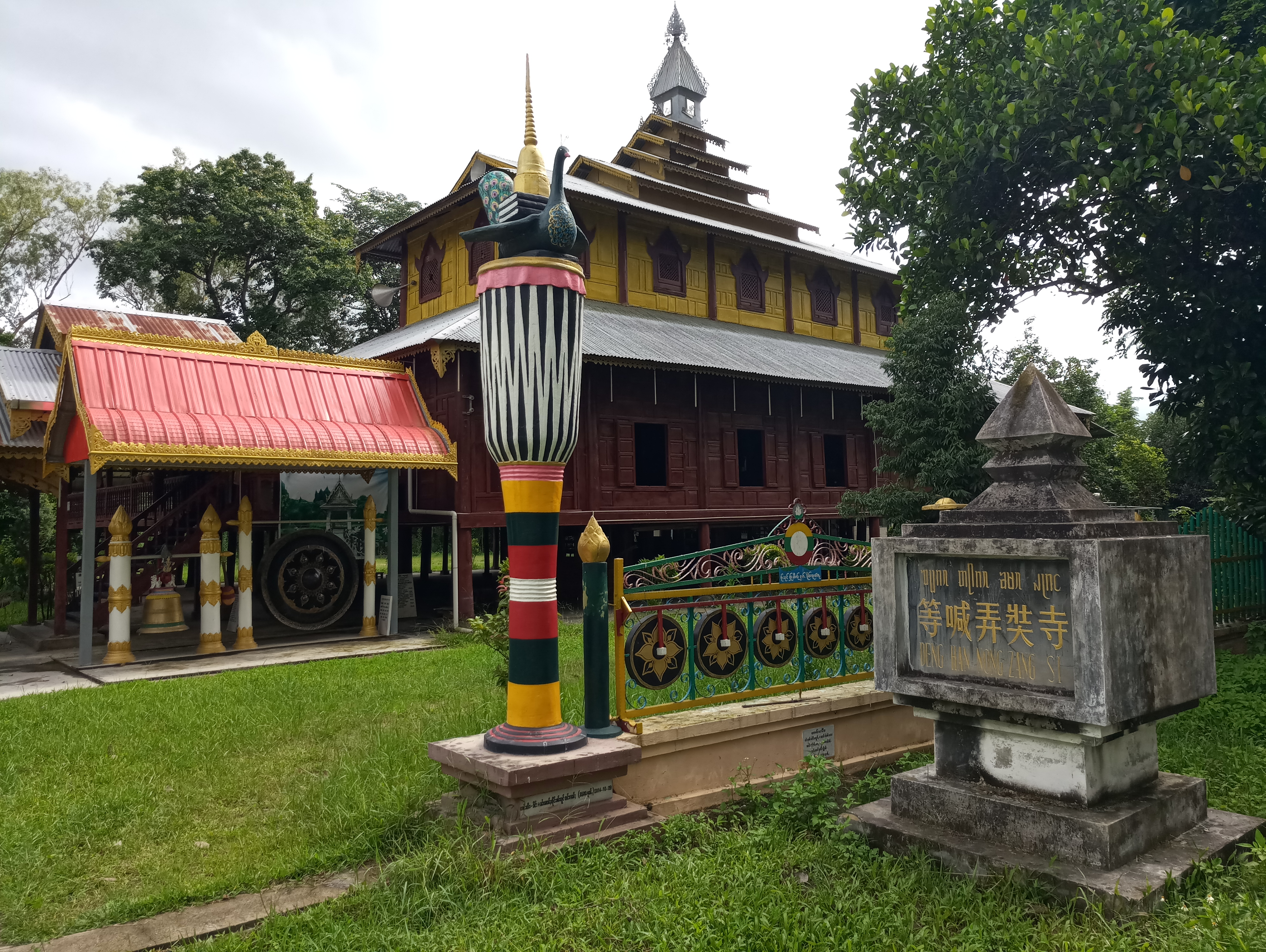
- Ruili City Hall Fortune Center Plaza Border port of Ruili Kyaung of Tëng Xäm Lóong

- Location of Ruili City in Dehong Prefecture within Yunnan province

- Location in Yunnan Ruili (China)
- Coordinates: 24°01′05″N 97°51′22″E
- Country: China
- Province: Yunnan
- Autonomous prefecture: Dehong
- Municipal seat: Mengmao Subdistrict

Area
  - Total: 1,020 km^{2} (390 sq mi)
- Elevation: 777 m (2,549 ft)

Population (2020 census)
  - Total: 267,638
  - Density: 262/km^{2} (680/sq mi)
- Time zone: UTC+8 (China Standard)
- Postal code: 678600
- Area code: 0692
- Website: www.ruili.gov.cn

Ruili (simplified Chinese: 瑞丽; traditional Chinese: 瑞麗; pinyin: Ruìlì; Tai Nüa: ᥛᥫᥒᥰ ᥛᥣᥝᥰ; Shan: မိူင်းမၢဝ်း; Thai: เมืองมาว; Burmese: ရွှေလီ), called Möng Mao in Tai, is a county-level city of Dehong Prefecture, in the west of Yunnan province, China. It is a major border crossing between China and Myanmar, with the town of Muse located across the border.

== Name ==
The city is named after the Shweli River. 瑞 ruì means "auspicious", and 丽 lì means "beautiful". An older name of Ruili is Mengmao (勐卯), derived from the Tai Nuea language "Mong Mao" (ᥝᥥᥒᥰ ᥛᥫᥒᥰ), meaning "foggy place".

== Geography and climate ==
Ruili is on the border with Myanmar. 64% of the population of Ruili are members of five highland and lowland ethnic minorities, including Dai, Jingpo, Deang, Lisu, and Achang. It is an important location for trade with Myanmar, in both legal and illegal goods and services. Prostitution and drug trade in the city are not uncommon.

Ruili has a warm humid subtropical climate (Köppen Cwa), and is generally humid. Summer is long and there is virtually no "winter" as such. Instead, there is a dry season (December through April) and wet season (May through October). A drier heat prevails from February till early May before the onset of the monsoon from the Indian Ocean. The monthly 24-hour average temperature ranges from 14.0 °C (57.2 °F) in January to 25.0 °C (77.0 °F) in June, while the annual mean is 21.0 °C (69.8 °F). Rainfall totals about 1,385 mm (55 in) annually, with nearly 70% of it occurring from June to September.

Bordered by monsoon evergreen broad-leaved forest, Ruili Botanical Garden is just north of the City and covers 5,000 acres (2,000 ha) of well-preserved native vegetation.

Climate data for Ruili, elevation 763 m (2,503 ft), (1991–2020 normals, extremes 1971–present)
Month	Jan	Feb	Mar	Apr	May	Jun	Jul	Aug	Sep	Oct	Nov	Dec	Year
Record high °C (°F)	26.9 (80.4)	31.3 (88.3)	33.8 (92.8)	36.3 (97.3)	36.4 (97.5)	36.3 (97.3)	33.8 (92.8)	34.4 (93.9)	36.8 (98.2)	32.9 (91.2)	31.1 (88.0)	27.3 (81.1)	36.8 (98.2)
Mean daily maximum °C (°F)	23.0 (73.4)	25.6 (78.1)	28.9 (84.0)	30.8 (87.4)	30.6 (87.1)	29.7 (85.5)	28.8 (83.8)	29.5 (85.1)	29.9 (85.8)	28.6 (83.5)	26.0 (78.8)	23.0 (73.4)	27.9 (82.2)
Daily mean °C (°F)	14.0 (57.2)	16.4 (61.5)	19.9 (67.8)	22.8 (73.0)	24.3 (75.7)	25.0 (77.0)	24.7 (76.5)	24.9 (76.8)	24.4 (75.9)	22.6 (72.7)	18.6 (65.5)	14.9 (58.8)	21.0 (69.9)
Mean daily minimum °C (°F)	8.2 (46.8)	9.9 (49.8)	13.2 (55.8)	16.9 (62.4)	20.0 (68.0)	22.2 (72.0)	22.4 (72.3)	22.4 (72.3)	21.5 (70.7)	19.2 (66.6)	14.4 (57.9)	10.3 (50.5)	16.7 (62.1)
Record low °C (°F)	1.4 (34.5)	2.2 (36.0)	5.5 (41.9)	9.7 (49.5)	13.6 (56.5)	16.3 (61.3)	16.5 (61.7)	15.8 (60.4)	15.4 (59.7)	9.5 (49.1)	5.2 (41.4)	2.2 (36.0)	1.4 (34.5)
Average precipitation mm (inches)	15.3 (0.60)	13.8 (0.54)	19.3 (0.76)	53.4 (2.10)	148.7 (5.85)	260.9 (10.27)	310.7 (12.23)	250.4 (9.86)	146.1 (5.75)	117.8 (4.64)	37.2 (1.46)	11.1 (0.44)	1,384.7 (54.5)
Average precipitation days (≥ 0.1 mm)	2.8	3.2	4.6	10.0	17.2	24.0	26.6	23.2	17.2	13.7	4.8	2.3	149.6
Average relative humidity (%)	76	67	61	63	72	80	84	83	81	80	80	81	76
Mean monthly sunshine hours	221.9	236.9	262.3	247.2	218.1	150.1	109.4	139.7	163.8	176.8	198.1	194.4	2,318.7
Percentage possible sunshine	66	74	70	65	53	37	26	35	45	50	61	59	53
Source 1: China Meteorological Administration all-time extreme temperature all-time Nov high
Source 2: Weather China

== Economy ==
Dehong is one of the three primary coffee cultivating regions in Yunnan. The main coffee planter and processor is Hogood Coffee, which operates a contracting scheme with local farmers. Hogood contracts farmland from smallholders, on which it plants seedlings, and then re-contracts with farmers to purchase the coffee beans at harvest.

Because of its position near the border with Myanmar, Ruili is an important hub of cross-border trade, including the new oil and gas pipeline coming up from Kyaukphyu, which is being expanded as part of the Belt and Road Initiative's Maritime Silk Road.

== Administrative divisions ==
Ruili City has 1 subdistrict, 3 towns and 2 townships.

1 subdistrict

- Mengmao Subdistrict (勐卯街道, ᥛᥫᥒᥰ ᥛᥣᥝᥰ ᥐᥣᥭ ᥖᥣᥝᥱ)

3 towns

- Wanding Town (畹町镇, ᥝᥢᥰ ᥖᥥᥒ ᥓᥫᥢᥱ)
- Nongdao Town (弄岛镇, ᥘᥩᥒᥴ ᥖᥝᥰ ᥓᥫᥢᥱ)
- Jiexiang Town (姐相镇, ᥓᥥ ᥔᥦᥒᥴ ᥓᥫᥢᥱ)

3 townships

- Huyu Township (户育乡, Hu yup Ning hton)
- Mengxiu Township (勐秀乡, ᥛᥫᥒᥰ ᥞᥥᥝᥰ ᥔᥦᥒ)

== Demography ==
Han Chinese and Dai mostly live in the valley. In the city, Jingpo and Deang live mostly in the outskirts in the surrounding hills. There is also a sizeable community of Burmese immigrants and their descendants (mostly Muslims), numbering around 50,000 in the city, with their livelihoods centred around Zhubao Street (known locally as "Myanmar Town").

== Industrial parks ==
- Wanding Border Economic Cooperation Zone

Wanding Border Economic Cooperation Zone (WTBECZ) is a Chinese State Council-approved Industrial Park based in Wanding Town of Ruili City, founded in 1992, and was established to promote Sino–Burmese trade. The zone spans 6 km^{2} (2.3 sq mi) and is focused on developing trading, processing, agriculture resources, and tourism.

- Ruili Border Economic Cooperation Zone

Ruili Border Economic Cooperation Zone (RLBECZ) is a Chinese State Council-approved Industrial Park based in Ruili, founded in 1992, and was established to promote trade between China and Myanmar. The area's import and export trade include the processing industry, local agriculture, and biological resources, which are very promising. Sino-Myanmar business is growing fast. Myanmar is now one of Yunnan's biggest foreign trade partners. In 1999, Sino-Myanmar trade accounted for 77.4% of Yunnan's foreign trade. In the same year, exports for electromechanical equipment came up to US$55.28 million. Main exports here include fiber cloth, cotton yarn, ceresin wax, mechanical equipment, fruits, rice seeds, fiber yarn, and tobacco.

== Transportation ==
The Dali–Ruili Railway, which will connect Ruili with China's national railway network, is under construction.

A feasibility study for a standard gauge line from Kunming, China to Kyaukphyu port started in 2021.
