= Möng Mao =

Historical polity in Asia

Möng Mao Lông ᥛᥫᥒᥰ ᥛᥣᥝᥰ ᥘᥨᥒᥴ (Tai Nüa) မိူင်းမၢဝ်းလူင် (Shan)
- 1276 (Note: The establishment of Möng Mao can differ based on interpretation. If Hkun Hpang Hkam becoming the ruler of Möng Mao is taken as the starting point, the date is 1256; if the establishment of Luchuan Route by the Yuan dynasty is taken as the starting point, the date is 1276; if the succession of Si Kefa is taken as the starting point, the date is 1335. If the legendary stories of its founding are taken as the starting point, dates such as 568, 835 and others could be suggested. If the tribal alliances hypothesized by historians are taken as the starting point, dates such as the 6th–7th centuries or the 10th–11th centuries are possible.)–1444 (Note: If the defeat of Si Renfa and the loss of the seal of the Luchuan Pacification Commission is taken as the ending point, the date is 1441; if the defeat of Si Jifa, the loss of Möng Mao’s former territory, and the retreat to Möng Yang is taken as the ending point, the date is 1444; if the defeat of Si Jifa in Möng Yang and the peace negotiations between Si Lufa and the Ming dynasty is taken as the ending point, the date is 1449. If the extinction of the Si family in Möng Yang at the hands of Burma is taken as the ending point, the date is 1604.)
- Core territory of Möng Mao Greatest extent of Möng Mao during the reign of Si Kefa (c. 1360)
- Status: Pacification commissioner of Pingmian under Yuan dynasty (1355-1384); Luchuan-Pingmian pacification commission under Ming dynasty (1384-1441)
- Capital: Selan (Note: The exact administrative center of the Si family has shifted around the Nam Mao valley until 1444. It is also rendered into English as "Zhelan", "Seilant", or "Che Lant".)
- Common languages: Old Shan (lingua franca and administrative language) Regional: Achang; Jiexie; Nu; Wa; Bulang; Ta'ang; Burmese; Pyu
- Religion: Tai folk religion Mahayana Buddhism; Theravada Buddhism
- Demonym: Tai Mao
- Government: Mandala kingdom
- Saopha
  - 1335–1369: Si Kefa (Hsö Hkan Hpa)
  - 1382–1399: Si Lunfa (Hsö Hom Hpa)
  - 1413–1442: Si Renfa (Hsö Ngan Hpa)
  - 1442–1444: Si Jifa
- Historical era: Late Middle Ages
  - Establishment of the Luchuan Route: 1276 (Note: The establishment of Möng Mao can differ based on interpretation. If Hkun Hpang Hkam becoming the ruler of Möng Mao is taken as the starting point, the date is 1256; if the establishment of Luchuan Route by the Yuan dynasty is taken as the starting point, the date is 1276; if the succession of Si Kefa is taken as the starting point, the date is 1335. If the legendary stories of its founding are taken as the starting point, dates such as 568, 835 and others could be suggested. If the tribal alliances hypothesized by historians are taken as the starting point, dates such as the 6th–7th centuries or the 10th–11th centuries are possible.)
  - Hsö Hkan Hpa becomes ruler of Möng Mao: c. 1335
  - Destruction of Pinya and Sagaing: 1364
  - Ming-Mong Mao War: 1380 –1388
  - Dao Ganmeng rebellion: 1397–1398
  - Luchuan–Pingmian campaigns: 1436–1449
  - Disestablished: 1444 (Note: If the defeat of Si Renfa and the loss of the seal of the Luchuan Pacification Commission is taken as the ending point, the date is 1441; if the defeat of Si Jifa, the loss of Möng Mao’s former territory, and the retreat to Möng Yang is taken as the ending point, the date is 1444; if the defeat of Si Jifa in Möng Yang and the peace negotiations between Si Lufa and the Ming dynasty is taken as the ending point, the date is 1449. If the extinction of the Si family in Möng Yang at the hands of Burma is taken as the ending point, the date is 1604.)
- Currency: Native silver and bronze ingots
Preceded by
Yuan dynasty
Succeeded by
Möng Yang
Ming dynasty
Shan states
Ahom kingdom
- Today part of: China; India; Myanmar

Möng Mao (Note: Shan: မိူင်းမၢဝ်း; Tai Nüa: ᥛᥫᥒᥰ ᥛᥣᥝᥰ; Ahom: 𑜉𑜢𑜤𑜂𑜫𑜉𑜨𑜰𑜧, Burmese: မိုင်းမော; Chinese: 勐卯; Also rendered into English as Moeng Mao, Mengmao, Mäng Maaw, Mong Mau, etc.) or Möng Mao Lông (Note: Tai Nüa: ᥛᥫᥒᥰ ᥛᥣᥝᥰ ᥘᥨᥒᥴ; Shan: မိူင်းမၢဝ်းလူင်; Ahom: 𑜉𑜢𑜤𑜂𑜫𑜉𑜨𑜰𑜧𑜊𑜤𑜂𑜫; Burmese: မိုင်းမောလုံ; Thai: อาณาจักรเมาหลวง) (lit. 'Great Möng Mao'), also known as Luchuan (Chinese: 麓川), was a Tai state that flourished from the 14th to 15th centuries, and consolidated dominance over the frontier regions of modern-day Myanmar, China, and India. The core territory was centered on the Nam Mao (Ruili) river basin.

Möng Mao was originally a Tai principality located on the Nam Mao (Ruili) and Longchuan regions, where it had historically managed tributary relations and political conflicts with larger states. Towards the end of the Yuan dynasty, Si Kefa became ruler of Möng Mao. During his reign, he conquered vast territories extending from Assam in Northeast India, the majority of Tai states in upper Burma, to the Red River in central Yunnan, and then marched south to destroy the kingdoms of Sagaing and Pinya.

When the Ming dynasty conquered Yunnan, Möng Mao’s ruler Si Lunfa chose to submit to Ming authority and accepted imperial investiture. But shortly after, he attacked Jingdong and Moshale, which were states under Möng Mao that had defected to the Ming, leading to several wars between the two countries. At that time, the Ming government still lacked the capacity to control Yunnan’s western frontier deeply and eventually accepted Möng Mao’s surrender.

After Si Lunfa’s death, the Ming took the opportunity to dismantle Möng Mao, dividing its territory into numerous smaller native chieftaincies. His later successor, Si Renfa, attempted to restore Möng Mao’s former domains, waging campaigns to annex neighboring tusi states. This ultimately prompted the Luchuan-Pingmian campaigns, in which the Si family was defeated and retreated to Möng Yang.

Following the weakening of Möng Mao, no single ethnic power dominated China’s southwestern frontier. The various tusi regimes remained in a state of rivalry and balance, creating favorable conditions for the rise of the Toungoo Empire in Myanmar.

== Names ==
The Tai name is Möng Mao (Tai Nüa: ᥛᥫᥒᥰ ᥛᥣᥝᥰ; Shan: မိူင်းမၢဝ်း). In Tai history, the polity is often called Möng Mao Lông, which means "Great Möng Mao" or "Great Mao kingdom", or sometimes Mok Khao Mao Luang, meaning "White Flower Great Mao". The Möng means country or place. The Mao (ᥛᥣᥝᥰ), derived from "dizzy" (ᥛᥝᥰ), is because the mother of legendary king Chao U Ting felt dizzy when she was brought to the sky by a bird. The name Möng Mao is still used currently, as the official Tai Nuea name of Ruili City (ᥝᥥᥒᥰ ᥛᥫᥒᥰ ᥛᥣᥝᥰ). Alternatively, Mao derives from the Shan name of the Nam Mao (Ruili River).

Möng Mao also adopted Kawsampi (ကောသမ္ဗိ) as its Buddhist classical name, named after Kosambi, an ancient Indian kingdom. The name was approximated into Burmese as "Koshanpyi" (ကိုးရှမ်းပြည်, lit. 'nine Shan States'). Kosambi is also called Guozhanbi (Tai Nüa: ᥐᥨᥝᥰ ᥓᥛᥱ ᥙᥤᥱ, Chinese: 果占璧) in Ruili, modern Dai people give a new explanation of Guozhanbi, which is "place that produces fragrant soft rice".

In Chinese literature, Möng Mao was called Luchuan (Chinese: 麓川), first recorded in Yuanshi as the name of the administrative division "Luchuan Circuit" (Chinese: 麓川路). Some of literature also called Mong Mao as Baiyi (Chinese: 百夷), but most of the time this is a collective name of all the ethnic groups in south west of Yunnan, or specifically refers to Dai people. The Tai name of Luchuan first appears in the Baiyi Guan laiwen 百夷館來文 (“Incoming correspondence of the Baiyi College”), included in the Huayi yiyu 華夷譯語 of the fifteenth century, as Mäng Maaw which gives Luchuan 麓川 as the Chinese equivalent.

In English literature, the earliest mention of Möng Mao appears in Robert Boileau Pemberton's account, who discovered and translated an ancient Shan manuscript. In it, he describes a kingdom whose capital the Shans refer to as Mongmaorong.

In Burmese literature, Möng Mao was called Maw or Maw Shan. In the Manipur literature, such as Cheitharol Kumbaba use the name Pong refer to Mong Mao.

== History ==
=== Early history ===
Little is known about the history of Möng Mao before the 13th century. Although Tai chronicles date its founding to as early is the 6th century, the differing details and dates in various local chronicles, the inclusion of mythological features, and a lack of corroborating evidence from external sources mean that these accounts are often regarded as legendary history. Many of these chronicles begin with the story of Hkun Lu (Hkun Lung) and Hkun Lai, who descended from heaven and established Möng Mao (or Kawsampi) in 568 (or 835 in some chronicles) and sent their children to rule over Tai chieftainships in the Nam Mao valley. Some chronicles instead begin with Chao U Ting. Jiang Yingliang believes that the Tai developed a stratified society in the Dehong area around the 10th century, consisting of four states, Möng Mao, Möng Yang, Möng Hsen Se, and Hsenwi, and that the center of power frequently shifted between these states and they were sometimes unified into a single state named Kawsambi.

Modern scholars and historians disagree on the early history, some believe that Möng Mao may have begun to emerge in the 6th century based on the legends of Hkun Lu and Hkun Lai, while others believe that there were no significant Tai polities in Yunnan and northern Myanmar before the Mongol invasions of Burma. According to the research of Jiang Yingliang, the lineage of the rulers of Möng Mao commenced in 1256, and this may have been when the polity emerged after the fall of Dali to the Mongol Empire.

=== Connection with Ahom history ===
The records of the Buranji in Tai-Ahom language tells the story of a Mao prince, Chaolung Sukaphaa who left Möng Mao Lung with his 9000 Tai Mao followers in 1215 AD, and established the Ahom kingdom in 1228 AD in modern day Assam. They were identified as the Mao section of Tai and were later called the Tai-Ahom. However, modern scholars disagree with the date of this history, and believes the founding of the Ahom kingdom should happen in the 14th century.

=== Relations with the Yuan dynasty ===
During this time, a patchwork of quarrelsome Tai polities existed in the land between Yongchang and Tagaung. They pledged allegiance to the Yuan dynasty as early as 1260. Multiple administrative divisions were set up in the region in 1276, and Möng Mao was designated as Luchuan Route.

From 1277–1303, the region was plagued with intense conflict and competition between the Pagan kingdom and Yuan dynasty. The Mongol-Yuan wanted to secure access to the Bay of Bengal, and waged two bloody wars in the region, the First Mongol invasion of Burma which toppled the Pagan kingdom, and the Second Mongol invasion of Burma which drove the Mongols out. The expulsion of Burmese power in 1286 and the shrinkage of Mongol-Yuan influence after the withdrawal of troops in 1303 afforded Tai leaders with the opportunity to reorganise and expand their power, and were now able to build new polities with less outside interference. Mongol authority diminished even further in 1330 when a succession crisis erupted in the Yuan court. The conflict spread to Yunnan, and rebel princes sought the military power of local leaders in exchange for titles and rewards. The rogue nobles were eventually suppressed, but Yunnan had now increasingly come under the control of local leaders, the Prince of Liang in Kunming and the Duan family in Dali increasingly overshadowed the central government.

=== Rise ===
Hsö Hkan Hpa (Chinese: Si Kefa) began the expansion of Möng Mao's territory in the 1330s–1340s, taking advantage of the good economic conditions and power vacuum in the region. Although chronicles disagree on the exact date of his accession to the throne, the most plausible date given is 1335. In Tai chronicles, Hsö Hkan Hpa gained the submission of neighbouring Tai states, including Hsenwi and Möng Mit, then gathered a large army to march against the governor of Yunnan. The Yuan court ordered local Yunnan authorities to subdue him and four military expeditions were sent in 1342, 1346, 1347 and 1348, but they ended in failure. Fearing further attacks, Hsö Hkan Hpa sent his son, the heir apparent (mansan 滿三 (Note: Mansan 滿三 is a Chinese transliteration of the Tai term maang saa ᥛᥣᥒᥰ ᥘᥣᥰ, meaning prince or heir apparent, a Burmese loanword used frequently in Tai literature.)), to the Yuan court to nominally recognize their authority. With the outbreak of the Red Turban Rebellions, there was little else the Yuan could do to subdue him, so he was appointed as the "Pingmian Pacification Commissioner", a title which recognized his control over new territories and further bolstered his prestige and legitimacy.

After the war with China, Hsö Hkan Hpa turned his attention west. He sent his brother Hkun Sam Lông west to conquer Assam, which surrendered without resistance and began paying tribute. However, believing his brother was conspiring against him, he poisoned and killed him on his return. The Sagaing kingdom sent an expedition against Möng Mao in 1356, possibly as a response to Möng Mao's expansion into Kale. Hsö Hkan Hpa then ordered expeditions against the Burmese kingdoms of Sagaing and Pinya. Shan raids were reported in 1359 and 1362, and finally the two kingdoms fell in 1364 and were completely devastated, leading to the rise of the Ava kingdom.

Hsö Hkan Hpa died in 1369. He was succeeded by his eldest son Si Bingfa (called Hsö Pem Hpa in Tai). In 1371, the subordinate states of Möng Yang and Kale went to war with each other. Si Bingfa ruled for 8 years and was succeeded by his son Tai Bian (Hkun Tai Pem Hpa). Tai Bian was a tyrant, and was killed by his uncle Zhao Xiaofa (Hkun Ngok Chyo Hpa) who established himself as ruler. A year later, Zhao Xiaofa was killed by bandits, and the people established his younger brother Si Wafa (Hsö Wan Hpa) as ruler.

=== Conflicts with the Ming dynasty ===
In 1374, the newly founded Ming dynasty sent a diplomatic mission to Burma, hoping to win over the states in the region. However, due to the roads being blocked in Annam, the envoys were recalled. When the Ming dynasty entered Yunnan in 1380, it quickly defeated the Mongol prince Basalawarmi and the Duan family in Dali, reaching the border of Möng Mao in 1382.

Initially, Möng Mao did not submit to the Ming dynasty and the Ming court did not recognize Möng Mao's control over neighbouring areas. Si Wafa attacked the Ming garrison at Jinchi (Baoshan) in 1382, but he was soon assassinated by one of his subordinates and Si Lunfa (Hsö Hom Hpa) became ruler of Möng Mao in his place. In 1382, Si Lunfa decided to submit to Ming authority, and was granted the tusi title of Pacification Commissioner of Pingmian. In August 1384 Si Lunfa sent a tribute mission to the Ming court surrendering the Yuan seal of commission. As a result he was promoted to Luchuan-Pingmian Pacification Commission with authority over military and civilian affairs.

The Tai ruler in Jingdong, E Tao, who was previously subordinate to Möng Mao, separately surrendered to the Ming court and was appointed as the "Native Prefect" of the region in 1384. Si Lunfa attacked Jingdong the following year to chastise him for his unfaithfulness, and E Tao fled for his life. A Ming expedition was sent against Si Lunfa in 1387, but they were defeated by Tai forces. The Ming believed that the Tai could not be trusted, and prepared military defenses all across the border regions, and diplomatically isolated Möng Mao. In 1388, Tai forces attacked the stockade at Moshale, but were defeated. Further Tai attacks were made on the Dingbian stockade, but these were also defeated. These attacks on Ming frontier outposts led to a large-scale Ming punitive expedition against Si Lunfa, resulting in another Ming victory. Si Lunfa surrendered in 1388, and was made to pay war reparations to the Ming forces.

=== Dao Ganmeng rebellion ===
In 1393 Si Lunfa invaded Ava. Despite the fact that he was ultimately defeated, Ava sent an envoy to the Ming seeking their help in deterring Mong Mao aggression. Acknowledging their position, the Hongwu Emperor sent a letter to Si Lunfa in 1396 warning him of retaliation if further acts of aggression were committed. Si Lunfa acquiesced to Ming demands. After Mong Mao stopped their military expansion, Si Lunfa began to welcome foreigners such as Buddhists and former Chinese soldiers into his people's traditional territory. Si Lunfa converted to Buddhism and gave gifts to the Chinese for bringing with them the technology of gunpowder and cannons. This greatly angered the traditional elements in his court and in 1397 Si Lunfa was deposed by the leader of an anti-foreigner faction, Dao Ganmeng, and fled to the Ming government for protection. After reaching the Ming capital, Si Lunfa enlisted the Hongwu Emperor's aid in returning him to power. The emperor, desiring peace in the southwest, agreed to his petition and allocated 100 taels of gold, 150 taels of silver, and 500 ding of paper money to his cause. The Marquis of Xiping, Mu Chun, was assigned to provide Si Lunfa military support and retake Möng Mao.

They returned to Yunnan and stayed in Baoshan while Mu Chun sent the commanders He Fu and Qu Neng with 5,000 troops to oust Dao Ganmeng. The expedition was met with initial success in battle, killing a Mong Mao chieftain, and routing his army, but arrived at an impasse when they failed to take a mountain stockade due to unfavorable terrain. He Fu relayed his situation to Mu Chun, who came to his aid with 500 cavalrymen, and in the midst of night advanced on the enemy position taking them by surprise. While they successfully took the stockade, Mu Chun died soon after from an illness and was replaced by He Fu, who captured Dao Ganmeng and installed Si Lunfa as ruler of Möng Mao once again in 1398.

Si Lunfa died in 1399, and was succeeded by his son Si Hangfa. The strength of Möng Mao waned, and principalities previously under its rule became independent. The Ming court took advantage of this situation by establishing 13 new states under its own rule, including Möng Yang (Mengyang), Hsenwi (Mubang), and Möng Ting (Mengding).

=== Luchuan–Pingmian campaigns ===
Si Hangfa was succeeded by his brother Si Renfa in 1413. Under Si Renfa, Möng Mao began a period of expansion into neighbouring regions to reassert control over previously owned territory. Si Renfa expanded west into Möng Yang in 1426, and made incursions into territory north of Möng Mao as far as Yongchang in 1428, but the Ming dynasty did not take any harsh measures against him yet. In the 1430s, conflicts between Möng Mao, Hsenwi, Ava, and various other states in the region intensified. The Ming planned a campaign against Möng Mao in 1434, but it was abandoned when Emperor Yingzong, an 8 year old, ascended the throne.

Si Renfa continued to expand, invading Nandian in 1437 and made further incursions into Ganyai, Tengchong, Lujiang, and Jinchi. Si Renfa appointed subordinate leaders to these neighbouring regions without asking the permission of the Ming court. At this point, the Ming considered Si Renfa unable to be reasoned with, and prepared a campaign, ordering Hsenwi to join the war against Möng Mao.

The first campaign was sent in 1438. One army pursued Si Renfa deep into his own territory, and was ambushed and destroyed by Si Renfa. After his victory, he became bolder and began expanding deeper into Ming territory, marching across the Salween river to invade places as far as and Jingdong and Menglian.

A second campaign was sent against Möng Mao in 1441. After an eight month long stalemate, Ming forces advanced deeper into Si Renfa's territory, and his capital was besieged. Möng Mao's capital fell in 1442, and Si Renfa fled to Möng Yang with his family. Imperial orders were given to Hsenwi and Ava to capture Si Renfa, with territory as a reward. Si Renfa was captured by the Burmese king, but the Ming hesitated to keep their promise of territory, so they did not hand him over to the Chinese. Si Renfa's son, Si Jifa, continued operations in southwestern Yunnan and tried to beg for pardon from the Ming court for his father and himself. He was defeated in Mangshi, but, seeing the Ming troops leave the region, he reoccupied Möng Mao and began invading neighbouring principalities again.

A third campaign was sent in 1443. Möng Mao's capital was captured again in 1444, and its core region was partitioned into a new state, Möng Wan (Longchuan), with a new ruling dynasty. Si Renfa again retreated to Möng Yang, but the Ming did not immediately pursue him as they were not sure which side Hsenwi and Ava would take.

A fourth campaign was sent to oust Si Jifa in Möng Yang in 1449. Ming armies crossed the Irrawaddy river into Möng Yang, and defeated Si Jifa's strongholds. Though Si Jifa and his brother Si Bufa escaped, the Ming armies considered it a victory and left the capture of Si Jifa to the Burmese. Silu, a younger son of Si Renfa, became the new leader of Möng Yang, the Ming general, realizing he could not defeat Silu and his supporters, made a peace treaty with him. A stone tablet was erected on the Irrawaddy river which marked the boundary, it stated: "Not before the stone is rotten and the river has dried up are you allowed to cross [the Irrawaddy]." Silu agreed, and the Ming troops left.

== Territorial extent ==
According to the Ming dynasty account in the Baiyi Zhuan (1396), the territory of Möng Mao extends for 10,000 li. The text defines its boundaries as Jingdong to the east, Xitian Gula (India) to the west, Babai Xifu (Lan Na) to the south, and Tibet to the north. It was also bounded by Cheli (Sipsongpanna) in the southeast, Mian (Ava) in the southwest, Ailao (Baoshan) in the northeast, and to the northwest lies Xifan and Huihe (Northwestern Yunnan).

Tai chronicles describes a significantly broader extant, particularly during the expansion period of Hsö Hkan Hpa (Si Kefa). Military expeditions led by the general Sam Lông Hpa are credited with receiving the submission of territories across Burma right up to Arakan, annexing many important cities on the banks of the Chindwin valley and conquering a great portion of eastern Assam. The annals also claim Mao influence reached as far as into northern and central Siam, as well as territories on the Mekong river.

In Burmese records, there is a stone tablet inscription which describes Möng Mao's territory in 1442, during the reign of Thonganbwa (Si Renfa), and lists 21 states under his domain: Möng Mao (မိုင်မော), Möng Yang (မိုင်ညင်), Dimasa kingdom (သမုတ္တရာနာ ကုလာတိမသာ ခြေချင်ဝတ်), Kale (မိုင်ကာလေ), Manipur (ကသည်), Northern Kachin state (ကခြင်), Möng Ting (မိုင်တိန်), Möng Ti (မိုင်တီ), Möng Na (မိုင်နာ), Möng Myen (မိုင်မျည်), Möng Yo (မိုင်ညိုဝ်), Moeng Lü (မိုင်လိုဝ်), Möng Saw (မိုင်သော်), Möng Ya (မိုင်ယာ), Möng Cheng (မိုင်ခြိုင်), Möng Hkwan (မိုင်ခုန်), Möng Yue (မိုင်ယိုဝ်), Linxiang (မိုင်ထုန်), Xuangang Township (မိုင်ခြေည်), Ning'er (မိုင်မေည်). Two locations (မိုင်ပြင်) and (ခြအိုဝ်) are unidentified.

== Government ==
=== Political structure ===
The political organization of the kingdom consisted of hierarchical officials who controlled units of people. This form of administration also bore a resemblance to the governing systems used in other Tai kingdoms such as Sipsongpanna (Moeng Lü), Lan Na, and Lan Xang. The Baiyi Zhuan, compiled by two Ming envoys who visited the polity in 1396, offers an elaborate contemporary description of the socialpolitical structure, as scholar Chris Baker observes:

The earliest account of [Tai] political structure, in the Bai-yi zhuan, suggests a complex of military, administrative, legal and cultural techniques to manage a varied population. The Bai-yi zhuan also hints at the famous capacity of the Tai muang to absorb others by emulation.

— Chris Baker

According to the account, the paramount ruler of Möng Mao was referred to as "Zhao" (ᥓᥝᥲ). In Tai literature, this title is also written as "Saopha" (ᥓᥝᥲ ᥜᥣᥳ), meaning "Lord of Heaven". Under him stood the "Zhao Meng" (ᥗᥣᥝᥳ ᥛᥫᥒᥰ) who exercises general control over administrative affairs. The subsequent ranks below the Zhao Meng are the "Zhao Lu" (ᥓᥝᥲ ᥘᥧᥰ), who controls over 10,000 people, the "Zhao Gang" (ᥓᥝᥲ ᥐᥣᥒᥰ), who controls over 1,000 people, the "Zhao Bo" (ᥓᥝᥲ ᥙᥣᥐᥱ), who controls 100 people, the "Zhao Ha-si" (ᥓᥝᥲ ᥔᥤᥙᥴ), who controls 50 people, and the "Zhao Zhun" (ᥓᥝᥲ ᥓᥧᥛᥲ), who controls 10 people. In the event of war and military deployments, a separate official called the "Zhao Lu-ling" is appointed to command troops in conjunction with the Zhao Meng. All officials, regardless of rank, are allocated territory in which they are permitted to levy corvee labour and taxes.

Modern scholars believe the Tai adopted much of their political structure from Yuan-Chinese administration. Additionally, Möng Mao's state organization has also been analyzed within the framework of the mandala political model, though with varying interpretations. In Jon Fernquest's research of the state-integration level of Möng Mao, due to the endemic warfares, fluctuating degree of control, and cyclical patterns of unity within its domain, he models the polity as a network of chieftainships that joined together occasionally for a common purpose in tenuous and changing confederations. Using Fernquest's conclusion, Ken Kirigaya compares Möng Mao with other mandala states of Sukhothai and Lan Na. Some scholars prefer to describe it as the Shan federation, Mao Shan federation or the Tai federation of Moeng Mao.

Others believe the Tai Mao rulers practiced a system of feudal land grants, dividing and redistributing conquered territories to loyal subordinates. For example, during Si Kefa's (Hsö Hkan Hpa) reign, he appointed Sao Tao Hkai to govern Möng Mit with the requirement of sending annual tribute to Möng Mao, appointed Dao Ganmeng (Tao Kang Mong) as ruler of Möng Tu in Hsenwi, and ordered Da Menfa to manage Linmadian village (Zhenkang). In the reign of Si Lunfa (Hsö Hom Hpa), Han Nuan was appointed Zhao Lu of Möng Ting, and his position was later transferred to govern Hsenwi, while Dao Suandang became Zhao Lu of Möng Bò (Weiyuan). Dao Jingfa, originally the Zhao Gang of Möng Ting, was promoted by Si Lunfa to Zhao Meng of Möng Tong (Wandian).

=== Military ===
According to the Baiyi Zhuan, Möng Mao maintained no formal distinction between military and civilian populations. When assembled, people became troops, and when dispersed, they return to being civilians. During wartime, every three to five persons will provide one soldier. The strongest individuals are selected as principal soldiers, called the "Xi-la" (锡剌), who controlled troops and defend against the enemy, while the others served as supply carriers. For this reason, while a military force may comprise 50,000-60,000 personnel, the fighters would number less than 20,000.

The military primarily utilizes war elephants as their main force, in which during combat, soldiers would secure themselves on to the top of elephants. Tactical formation were limited, with military columns lacking formal marshaling and coordination between front and rear units. For protection, the troops wore leather headwear and armours of bronze or iron. For weapons, they used long spears and crossbows, but are generally not proficient with bow and arrows.

=== Legal enforcement ===
Möng Mao did not have written legal statutes, and instead relied on customary law. For minor crimes, a fine is imposed, while serious crimes resulted in the death penalty. The various methods of execution were lynching, elephant trampling, drowning, or strangulation by cords, though the practice of whipping were absent. Engaging in adultery and theft also had punishments severe enough that the Ming observers noted the people would not dare to commit such offenses.

== Capital city ==
Möng Mao had various capitals located around the Nam Mao valley (modern Ruili and its adjacent border regions in Myanmar), and Selan was the capital which was most often adopted. According to the Hsenwi Chronicle, Selan had been built by Hsö Hkan Hpa (c. 1335), and was fortified with strong walls and deep moats.

The remains of these old capitals were described by James George Scott in the early 20th century:

The modern Sè Lan is a village of no great size. It stands on the highest point of an irregular four-sided plateau, which rises to a height of 260 or 300 feet above the valley level and is about a square mile in area. This plateau is completely surrounded by an entrenched ditch, which is in many places 40 or 50 feet deep. There no doubt was once also a wall, but this has completely mouldered away. A few miles off is Pang Hkam, also an old Mao capital, and also with the remains of an earthen parapet and ditch enclosing an even larger area. In the neighbourhood are a number of bare detached hills surrounded by formidable entrenchments.

— James George Scott

== List of Monarchs ==
The various versions of the Möng Mao Chronicle provide the lineage of Möng Mao rulers. The Shan chronicle tradition, recorded very early by Elias (1876), provides a long list with the first ruler of Möng Mao dating from 568 A.D. The dates in Elias for later rulers of Möng Mao do not match very well the dates in Ming dynasty sources such as Ming Shilu (Wade, 2005) and Baiyi Zhuan (Wade, 1996) which are considered more reliable from the time of the ruler Si Kefa. Bian-zhang-ga (1990), translated into Thai by Witthayasakphan and Zhao Hongyun (2001), also provides a fairly detailed local chronicle of Möng Mao.

Chinese name	Years	Length	Succession	Death	Tai Lông (Shan) Name	Tai Nua Name	Burmese name	Other names
Si Kefa 思可法	1335–1369	34 years		natural	Sua-Khān-Fā သိူဝ်ၶၢၼ်ႇၾႃႉ	Se-Xaan-Faa ᥔᥫᥴ ᥑᥣᥢᥱ ᥜᥣᥳ	Tho Chi Bwa (Note: (Maha Yazawin Vol. 1 2006: 272) and (Hmannan Vol. 1 2003: 392): Tho Chi Bwa was a brother of Lord Tho Han Bwa. (Yazawin Thit Vol. 1 2012: 170): Tho Chi Bwa was a son of Tho Khin Bwa, Lord of Maw.) သိုချည်ဘွား	Hsö-Khan-Pha
Zhao Bingfa 昭併發	1369–1378	8 years	son	natural				
Tai Bian 臺扁	1378/79	1 year	son	murdered				
Zhao Xiaofa 昭肖發	1379/80	1 year	brother of Zhao Bingfa	murdered				
Si Wafa 思瓦發	?	?	brother	murdered	Sua-Wak-Fā သိူဝ်ဝၵ်ႉၾႃႉ	Se-Vak-Faa ᥔᥫᥴ ᥝᥐᥳ ᥜᥣᥳ		Hsö-Wak-Pha
Si Lunfa 思倫發	1382–1399	17 years	grandson of Si Kefa		Sua-Lông-Fā သိူဝ်လူင်ၾႃႉ	Se-Loong-Faa ᥔᥫᥴ ᥘᥨᥒᥴ ᥜᥣᥳ	Tho Ngan Bwa I (Note: All the main Burmese chronicles—(Maha Yazawin Vol. 1 2006: 297) (Yazawin Thit Vol. 1 2012: 200) and (Hmannan Vol. 1 2003: 424)—give the name as Tho Ngan Bwa, the same name as the sawbwa in the 15th century.) သိုငံဘွား	Hsö-Long-Hpa
Si Hangfa 思行發	1404–1413	9 years	son	abdicated				
Si Renfa 思任發	1413–1445/6	29 years	brother	executed	Sua-Wen-Fā သိူဝ်ဝဵၼ်းၾႃႉ	Se-Ween-Faa ᥔᥫᥴ ᥝᥥᥢᥰ ᥜᥣᥳ	Tho Ngan Bwa II (Note: (Hmannan Vol. 2 2003: 82, 88): Great grandson of Tho Chi Bwa) သိုငံဘွား	Hso Ngan Pha; Sa Ngam Pha; Hsö-Wen-Pha
Si Jifa 思機發	1445/6–?		son	executed			Tho Kyein Bwa (Note: (Yazawin Thit Vol. 1 2012: 291) and (Hmannan Vol. 2 2003: 91): Both Tho Kyein Bwa and Tho Bok Bwa were still alive in 1451.) သိုကျိန်ဘွား	Sa Ki Pha, Chau Si Pha
Si Bufa 思卜發	1449–1461			natural			Tho Bok Bwa (Note: (Yazawin Thit Vol. 1 2012: 291) and (Hmannan Vol. 2 2003: 91): Both Tho Kyein Bwa and Tho Bok Bwa were still alive in 1451. Tho Bok Bwa was appointed sawbwa of Mohnyin by King Narapati I of Ava.) သိုပုတ်ဘွား	
Si Hongfa	1465?–1479?						Tho Han Bwa သိုဟန်ဘွား	
Si Lufa?	1482?–?							
Si Lun	1500s?–1533			murdered			Sawlon စလုံ	

== Bibliography ==
- Aung Tun, Sai (2009). History of the Shan State: From Its Origins to 1962. Chiang Mai: Silk Worm Books. ISBN 978-974-9511-43-5.
- Bian-zhang-ga. (1990). "Hemeng gumeng: Meng Mao gudai zhuwang shi [A History of the Kings of Meng Mao]." In Meng Guozhanbi ji Meng Mao gudai zhuwang shi [History of Kosampi and the kings of Meng Mao]. Gong Xiao Zheng. (tr.) Kunming, Yunnan, Yunnan Minzu Chubanshe.
- Cadchumsang, Jaggapan (2011). People at the Rim: A Study of Tai Ethnicity and Nationalism in a Thai Border Village.
- Daniels, Christian (2006). "Historical memories of a Chinese adventurer in a Tay chronicle; Usurpation of the throne of a Tay polity in Yunnan, 1573-1584". International Journal of Asian Studies. 3 (1): 21–48. doi:10.1017/S1479591405000203.
- Daniels, Christian (2018-11-28). "The Mongol-Yuan in Yunnan and ProtoTai/Tai Polities during the 13th-14th Centuries". The Journal of the Siam Society. 106. ISSN 2651-1851.
- Elias, N. (1876) Introductory Sketch of the History of the Shans in Upper Burma and Western Yunnan. Calcutta: Foreign Department Press. (Recent facsimile Reprint by Thai government in Chiang Mai University library).
- Fernquest, Jon (Autumn 2006). "Crucible of War: Burma and the Ming in the Tai Frontier Zone (1382–1454)". SOAS Bulletin of Burma Research. 4 (2).
- Translated by 龚肃政 (Gong Suzheng); Explained by 杨永生 (Yang Yongsheng) (1988). "银云瑞雾的勐果占璧简史 (Yin yun rui wu de meng guo zhan bi jian shi)" [Chronicle of Guo-zhan-bi]. 勐果占璧及勐卯古代诸王史 (Meng guo zhan bi ji meng mao gu dai zhu wang shi) (in Chinese). Kunming: Yunnan Nationalities Publishing House. pp. 1–51. ISBN 7-5367-0352-X.
- G. E. Harvey (1925). History of Burma: From the Earliest Times to 10 March 1824. London: Frank Cass & Co. Ltd.
- 胡绍华 (Hu Shaohua) (1984). "试述"百夷"含义的历史演变" [A discuss of the historical evolution of the meaning of "Baiyi"]. 中央民族学院学报 (Journal of Minzu University of China) (in Chinese) (3): 85–89. doi:10.15970/j.cnki.1005-8575.1984.03.022.
- Jiang Yingliang (1983) Daizu Shi [History of the Dai ethnicity], Chengdu: Sichuan Renmin Chubanshe.
- Kala, U (2006) [1724]. Maha Yazawin (in Burmese). Vol. 1–3 (4th printing ed.). Yangon: Ya-Pyei Publishing.
- Kam Mong, Sai (2004) The History and Development of the Shan Scripts, Chiang Mai; Silkworm Books.
- Kirigaya, Ken (2015). "The Early Syām and Rise of Mäng Mao: Western Mainland Southeast Asia in the "Tai Century"". The Journal of the Siam Society. 103: 235–268. ISSN 2651-1851.
- Liew, Foon Ming (1996), The Luchuan-Pingmian Campaigns (1436-1449) in the Light of Official Chinese Historiography
- Maha Sithu (2012) [1798]. Myint Swe; Kyaw Win; Thein Hlaing (eds.). Yazawin Thit (in Burmese). Vol. 1–3 (2nd printing ed.). Yangon: Ya-Pyei Publishing.
- 孟尊贤 (Meng Zunxian) (2007). 傣汉词典 (Dai han ci dian) [Tai Nuea - Chinese Dictionary] (in Chinese). Kunming: Yunnan Nationalities Publishing House. ISBN 978-7-5367-3790-7.
- Robinson, David M. (2020). In the Shadow of the Mongol Empire: Ming China and Eurasia. Cambridge University Press. ISBN 978-1-108-48244-8.
- Royal Historical Commission of Burma (2003) [1832]. Hmannan Yazawin (in Burmese). Vol. 1–3. Yangon: Ministry of Information, Myanmar.
- Saroj Nalini Arambam Parratt (2005). The Court Chronicle of the Kings of Manipur: The Cheitharon Kumpapa. London: Routledge. ISBN 0-203-44427-2.
- Scott, J.G (1900), Gazetteer of Upper Burma and the Shan States.
- Saimong Mangrai, Sao (1965). The Shan States and the British Annexation. Ithaca, New York: Cornell University. ISBN 978-0877270577.
- Sun, Laichen (2000), Ming-Southeast Asian overland interactions, 1368-1644
- Taw Sein Ko (1899). Inscriptions of Pagan, Pinya and Ava: Translation, with Notes. Rangoon: Government Printing, Burma.
- Wade, Geoff (1996), The Bai Yi Zhuan: A Chinese Account of Tai Society in the 14th Century. 14th Conference of the International Association of Historians of Asia (IAHA), Chulalongkorn University, Bangkok, Thailand. (Includes translation of (Jiangliang, 1980), a copy can be found at the Thailand Information Center at Chulalongkorn Central Library)
- Wade, Geoff. tr. (2005) Southeast Asia in the Ming Shi-lu: an open access resource, Singapore: Asia Research Institute and the Singapore E-Press, National University of Singapore, https://epress.nus.edu.sg/msl/
- Witthayasakphan, Sompong and Zhao Hongyun (translators and editors) (2001) Phongsawadan Muang Tai (Khreua Muang ku muang), Chiang Mai: Silkworm. (Translation of Mong Mao chronicle into the Thai language)
- Santasombat, Yos (2008-12-01). Lak Chang: A Reconstruction of Tai Identity in Daikong. ANU E Press. ISBN 978-1-921536-39-7.
- 尤中 (You Zhong) (1987). "明朝"三征麓川"叙论" [Introduction of Three Conquests Luchuan by Ming]. 思想战线 (Thinking) (in Chinese) (4): 58–64+57.
- 龚肃政译; 杨永生注 (1988). "银云瑞雾的勐果占璧简史". 勐果占璧及勐卯古代诸王史. 昆明: 云南民族出版社. pp. 1–51. ISBN 7-5367-0352-X.
- 方国瑜 (2001). "麓川思氏谱牒笺证". 方国瑜文集 第三辑. 昆明: 云南教育出版社. pp. 532–559. ISBN 7-5415-1942-1.
- 毕奥南 (2005). "洪武年间明朝与麓川王国关系考察". 中国边疆史地研究. 15 (2): 102–111+148–149. doi:10.3969/j.issn.1002-6800.2005.02.012.
- 段红云 (2011). "明代中缅边疆的变迁及其影响". 云南民族大学学报(哲学社会科学版). 28 (5): 150–155. doi:10.13727/j.cnki.53-1191/c.2011.05.013.
- Baker, Chris (2002). "From Yue To Tai" (PDF). Journal of the Siam Society. 90 (1–2): 16.
- Grabowsky, Volker (2004). "The Northern Tai Polity of Lan Na (Babai-Dadian) Between the Late 13th to Mid-16th Centuries: Internal Dynamics and Relations with Her Neighbours". ARI Working Paper Series (17). Asia Research Institute, National University of Singapore: 41–44.
- Zhou, Hanli (2024). The Survival Politics of Three Tai Nüa Polities in the Upper Mekong Basin During the Eighteenth and Nineteenth Centuries. Department of Southeast Asian History (PhD dissertation). University of Hamburg. pp. 46–50.
- 曹, 成章 (1982). "傣族封建社会的形成". 民族学研究 第三辑 (in Chinese). 北京: 民族出版社. pp. 220–239. CSBN 3049·108.
- Scott, J.G (1967). Hsenwi State Chronicle (PDF). Translated by J.G Scott. The Guardian.
- 土官底簿 [Register of native officials] (翻印 ed.). 上海: 商务印书馆. 1935.
- ဝေါင်းမိူင်းခမ်း (Waaw Muong Kham) (2022). မိုင်းမောဆေအနွယ်တို့၏ခေတ်နှင့်စစ် [The Era and War of the Mong Mao-Se Lineage] (in Burmese) (1st ed.). Yangon: လပြည့်လင်းပုံနှိပ်တိုက် (La Pyae Linn printing house). ဆန်းစသော်တာ (၀၀၁၀၃).
- Gogoi, Padmeswar (1956). "The Political Expansion of the Mao Shans" (PDF). Journal of the Siam Society. 44 (2).
- Narada, Phra Nawkham (2015). A Study of Features of Tai Grammar (Master of Arts thesis). Mahachulalongkornrajavidyalaya University.
- Elias, Ney (1876). Introductory Sketch of the History of the Shans in Upper Burma and Western Yunnan. Printed at the Foreign Department Press.
- Ferguson, Jane (2021). Repossessing Shanland: Myanmar, Thailand, and a Nation-State Deferred. University of Wisconsin Press. doi:10.2307/j.ctv2175gx5. ISBN 978-0-299-33300-3. JSTOR j.ctv2175gx5.
