= Here to There =

Studio album by DJ Spinna
- Released: February 3, 2003
- Recorded: 2001–02
- Studio: Freedom Soundz, London; Thingamijig Lab, Brooklyn, New York City
- Genre: Blues; hip hop; house; jazz; R&B
- Length: 75:58
- Label: BBE, Rapster Records
- Producer: DJ Spinna

DJ Spinna chronology
Heavy Beats Volume 1 (1999)	Here to There (2003)	Intergalactic Soul (2006)

Professional ratings
Review scores
Source	Rating
AllMusic	4/5 stars
Pitchfork	7.5/10

Here to There is the second studio album by hip hop producer DJ Spinna. It is the eighth installment of BBE Beat Generation series, after releases by Pete Rock, J Dilla, DJ Jazzy Jeff, will.i.am and many others. It was released on February 3, 2003 on BBE Records. The album features appearances by various artists who sang, rapped or played musical instruments.

== Track listing ==
No.	Title	Writer(s)	Length
1.	"Alfonso's Thang" (featuring Alfonso Greer and Ticklah)	Tom McIntosh; Victor Axelrod; Vince Williams	6:00
2.	"Drive" (featuring Shadowman from OldWorldDisorder)	Gernard Barr; Williams	3:56
3.	"Hold" (featuring Apani B and Jean Grae)	Apani Smith; Tsidi Ibrahim; Williams	4:05
4.	"Tune You Out" (featuring Rise)	Jean Myrthil; Williams	4:11
5.	"Galactic Soul"	Williams	4:27
6.	"Idols" (featuring Vinia Mojica)	Williams; Vinia Mojica	5:10
7.	"All Up in It"	Eric Krasno; Neal Evans; Williams	4:10
8.	"You Got to Live" (featuring Jigmastas and Mr. Akil)	Delano Ogbourne; Preston Bolt; Williams	4:23
9.	"Surely" (featuring Ovasoul7)	Delano Grimes; Mark de Clive-Lowe; Williams	4:52
10.	"Rock (Unplugged)" (featuring Tortured Soul)	Williams	4:34
11.	"Fly or Burn" (featuring the Bedouin)	Darren Hymes; Williams	5:26
12.	"Glad You're Mine" (featuring Angela Johnson)	Angela Johnson; Williams	5:04
13.	"Love Is Sold" (featuring Abdul Shyllon)	Abdul Shyllon; Clive-Lowe; Williams	6:38
14.	"Music in Me (Interlude)"	Selan Lerner; Williams	1:39
15.	"Music in Me (Come Alive)" (featuring Shaun Escoffery)	Clive-Lowe; Shaun Escoffery; Williams	5:25
16.	"The Originator"	James Hurt; Williams	5:07
Total length:			75:58

== Personnel ==
- DJ Spinna – producer on all tracks, bass on "Alfonso's Thang", vocals on "Drive", scratching on "Galactic Soul", "All Up in It", "Rock (Unplugged)" and "Fly or Burn", tambourine on "Rock (Unplugged)"
- Mark de Clive-Lowe – keyboards on "Surely", bass, keyboards and co-producer on "Love Is Sold" and "Music in Me (Come Alive)"
- Eric "BLB" Coomes – bass on "Glad You're Mine" and "The Originator"
- Godfrey Danchimah – vocals on "The Originator"
- Shaun Escoffery – vocals on "Music in Me (Come Alive)"
- Neal Evans – Hammond B-3 organ on "All Up in It"
- Apani B. Fly – vocals on "Hold"
- Jean Grae – vocals on "Hold"
- Alfonso Greer – vocals on "Alfonso's Thang"
- James Hurt – keyboards on "The Originator"
- Angela Johnson – vocals, clavinet and bass on "Glad You're Mine"
- Ronny Jordan – guitar on "Surely" and "Music in Me (Come Alive)"
- Eric Krasno – guitar on "All Up in It"
- Jason Kriveloff – bass on "Rock (Unplugged)"
- Jordan McLean – trumpet on "The Originator"
- Vinia Mojica – vocals on "Idols"
- Ovasoul7 – vocals on "Surely"
- Jay Rodriguez – flute, alto saxophone and baritone saxophone on "Rock (Unplugged)"
- Selan – ARP string ensemble, bass and synthesizer on "Galactic Soul", keyboards on "Music in Me (Interlude)"
- Mark Sherman – vibraphone on "Idols"
- Abdul Shyllon – vocals on "Love Is Sold"
- Mike T – percussion on "The Originator"
- Kaidi Tatham – Moog Prodigy synthesizer on "Love Is Sold"
- Mark Tewarson – guitar on "Rock (Unplugged)"
- Ticklah – keyboards and co-producer on "Alfonso's Thang", organ and keyboards on "Idols", keyboards on "Surely"
- Christian Urich – drums on "Rock (Unplugged)"
