= Si Kefa =

Si Kefa Hsö Hkan Hpa

Ruler of Möng Mao
- Reign: 1335–1369
- Successor: Si Bingfa (Hsö Pem Hpa)
- Born: 1294
- Died: 1369 (aged 75)

Si Kefa (1296–1369; Chinese: 思可法; Tai Nüa: ᥔᥫᥴ ᥑᥣᥢᥱ ᥜᥣᥳ; Shan: သိူဝ်ၶၢၼ်ႇၾႃႉ), also known as Hsö Hkan Hpa or Thohanbwa, was the ruler of Möng Mao from 1335 to 1369. He sacked the Burmese kingdoms of Sagaing and Pinya in 1364.

Territory of Möng Mao at its greatest extent under Si Kefa

== Name ==
At birth, Si Kefa was named Chao Yi or Hkun Yi Kang Hkam, meaning "Second Lord" in Tai Nüa.

On his coronation he obtained the name Hsö Hkan Hpa (Tai Nüa: ᥔᥫᥴ ᥑᥣᥢᥱ ᥜᥣᥳ, Soe Khan Fa), meaning "Tiger Clawed Lord", and Tai chronicles attribute its origin to the claw marks left on his back by a tiger. Other romanizations of this name include Hso Khan Pha, Säkhanpha, Sä Khaan Faa, Soe Khan Fa, Surkhanfa, Chau-Kwam-Pha, and Sukampha.

His name was translated into Chinese as Si Kefa (Chinese: 思可法 or 死可伐; pinyin: Sī Kěfǎ or Sǐ Kěfá), and into Burmese as Thohanbwa (Burmese: သိုဟန်ဘွား).

== Rise to power ==
The exact date of Si Kefa's accession to the throne is unknown. In 1330, a native official of the Yuan dynasty was appointed to Luchuan Route (Möng Mao), but it's unclear if this official was Si Kefa. At the time, Luchuan was just one of many minor Tai polities in southwestern Yunnan. Luchuan was not mentioned again until 1342, by which point Si Kefa had already transformed his kingdom into the region's dominant power, and the Yuan were sending a punitive expedition against him.

Tai chronicles are also unclear about the exact date of his accession, sometimes differing considerably from one chronicle to another. The most plausible date given is 1335, the year of his accession in a local chronicle of Möng Mao.

== Reign ==
In Tai chronicles, after gaining the throne Hsö Hkan Hpa first built a new capital at Selan, fortifying it with strong walls and deep moats. He then gained the submission of neighbouring Tai states, including Hsenwi, Möng Mit and Küngma, and gathered a large army to march into Yunnan.

The Yuan court ordered local Yunnan authorities to subdue him and four military expeditions were sent in 1342, 1346, 1347 and 1348, but they ended in failure. Fearing further attacks, Hsö Hkan Hpa sent his son, the heir apparent (mansan 滿三 (Note: Mansan 滿三 is a Chinese transliteration of the Tai term maang saa ᥛᥣᥒᥰ ᥘᥣᥰ, meaning prince or heir apparent, a Burmese loanword used frequently in Tai literature.)), to the Yuan court to nominally recognize their authority. With the outbreak of the Red Turban Rebellions, there was little else the Yuan could do to subdue him, so he was appointed as the "Pingmian Pacification Commissioner", a title which recognized his control over new territories and further bolstered his prestige and legitimacy.

After the war with China, Hsö Hkan Hpa turned his attention west. He sent his brother Hkun Sam Long west to conquer Assam, which surrendered without resistance and began paying tribute. However, believing his brother was conspiring against him, he poisoned and killed him on his return. The Sagaing kingdom sent an expedition against Möng Mao in 1356, possibly as a response to Möng Mao's expansion into Kale. Hsö Hkan Hpa then ordered expeditions against the Burmese kingdoms of Sagaing and Pinya. Shan raids were reported in 1359 and 1362, and finally the two kingdoms fell in 1364 and were completely devastated, leading to the rise of the Ava kingdom.

Hsö Hkan Hpa died in 1369. He was succeeded by his eldest son Si Bingfa (Hsö Pem Hpa).

Both the Möng Mao and Hsenwi chronicles provide lists of the far-flung domains he is said to have controlled, reaching to the border of the Kingdom of Dali in the north, Xishuangbanna to the south, Central Myanmar to the southwest, and Yongchang to the west.

In the Burmese chronicles, he is remembered as the leader of the 'Maw' forces that sacked the kingdoms of Sagaing and Pinya in 1364. He brought back King Narathu of Pinya and the loot to the Maw country. In the wake of the attacks, a Sagaing prince named Thado Minbya founded the Ava Kingdom in 1365.

Si Kefa has a privileged position in Möng Mao chronicle history as defining "an age when the Tay [Tai] lived in an expansive independent kingdom ruled by their own kings and use it as a point of departure for their accounts of post-fifteenth century history"

== Bibliography ==
- Daniels, Christian (2006). "Historical memories of a Chinese adventurer in a Tay chronicle; Usurpation of the throne of a Tay polity in Yunnan, 1573-1584". International Journal of Asian Studies. 3 (1): 21–48.
- Elias, N. (1876) Introductory Sketch of the History of the Shans in Upper Burma and Western Yunnan. Calcutta: Foreign Department Press. (Recent facsimile Reprint by Thai government in Chiang Mai University library).
- Fang Guoyu (2001). "Annotations on the genealogy of the Luchuan Si family". 麓川思氏谱牒笺证 [Collected Works of Fang Guoyu] (in Chinese). Vol. 3. Kunming: Yunnan Education Press. pp. 532–559. ISBN 7-5415-1942-1.
- Fernquest, Jon (Autumn 2006). "Crucible of War: Burma and the Ming in the Tai Frontier Zone (1382–1454)". SOAS Bulletin of Burma Research. 4 (2).
- Liew, Foon Ming. (1996) "The Luchuan-Pingmian Campaigns (1436-1449): In the Light of Official Chinese Historiography". Oriens Extremus 39/2, pp. 162–203.
- Maha Sithu (2012) [1798]. Myint Swe; Kyaw Win; Thein Hlaing (eds.). Yazawin Thit (in Burmese). Vol. 1–3 (2nd printing ed.). Yangon: Ya-Pyei Publishing.
- Kala, U (2006) [1724]. Maha Yazawin (in Burmese). Vol. 1–3 (4th printing ed.). Yangon: Ya-Pyei Publishing.
- Royal Historical Commission of Burma (2003) [1832]. Hmannan Yazawin (in Burmese). Vol. 1–3. Yangon: Ministry of Information, Myanmar.
- Wade, Geoff (1996), The Bai Yi Zhuan: A Chinese Account of Tai Society in the 14th Century. 14th Conference of the International Association of Historians of Asia (IAHA), Chulalongkorn University, Bangkok, Thailand. (Includes translation of (Jiangliang, 1980), a copy can be found at the Thailand Information Center at Chulalongkorn Central Library)
- Kirigaya, Ken (2015). "The Early Syām and Rise of Mäng Mao: Western Mainland Southeast Asia in the "Tai Century"". The Journal of the Siam Society. 103: 235–268. ISSN 2651-1851.
- Daniels, Christian (2018-11-28). "The Mongol-Yuan in Yunnan and ProtoTai/Tai Polities during the 13th-14th Centuries". The Journal of the Siam Society. 106. ISSN 2651-1851.
- 召帕雅坦玛铁・卡章戛 (1988). 勐果占壁及勐卯古代诸王史: 汉傣文对照 (in Chinese). 云南民族出版社. ISBN 978-7-5367-0352-0.
- Scott, J.G (1900), Gazetteer of Upper Burma and the Shan States. In five volumes.
  - Part 1 Volume 1
  - Part 1 Volume 2
  - Part 2 Volume 1
  - Part 2 Volume 2
  - Part 2 Volume 3
