= Ray Avery =

Ray Avery may refer to:

- Ray Avery (scientist) (born 1947), New Zealand scientist and inventor
- Ray Avery (photographer) (1920–2002), American photographer
