= Jazz Scene USA =

Jazz Scene USA was an American television program of 26 30-minute episodes recorded in 1962, which featured performances by leading jazz musicians of the time. It was produced by Jimmie Baker, directed by Steve Binder, and (except for the first episode) was presented by Oscar Brown Jr.

== History ==
Jazz Scene USA was initiated by jazz fan and television personality Steve Allen, who had regularly introduced and promoted jazz performers on The Tonight Show. Allen and his company, Meadowlane Productions, provided the financing for Jazz Scene USA. An independent production, it was recorded at the CBS Television City studios in Hollywood. Allen invited Jimmie Baker to produce the show. Baker had previously produced the show Stars of Jazz, which had run between 1956 and 1958. The shows were directed by Steve Binder, who had also worked on Stars of Jazz.

The first show was filmed on April 21, 1962, featured the Jazz Crusaders, and was hosted by KMLA radio DJ Vern Stevenson. Subsequent shows were hosted by jazz singer Oscar Brown Jr.. In all, 26 shows were recorded. The series was shown on selected TV stations, including KOGO-TV in San Diego, who started running the series in December 1962. It was sold on a syndication basis to stations and CATV operators. Allen had hoped to produce a second series of 26 episodes, but these were never made because of a lack of funding.

Eight of the programs were subsequently issued on VHS and DVD.

== Episodes ==
1. The Jazz Crusaders
2. Les McCann
3. Shelly Manne *
4. Teddy Edwards *
5. Paul Horn
6. Frank Rosolino *
7. Joe Pass
8. Harold Land / Red Mitchell
9. Teddy Buckner
10. Pete Fountain
11. Nancy Wilson
12. Barney Kessel
13. Stan Kenton *
14. Shorty Rogers *
15. Cal Tjader
16. Phineas Newborn Jr. *
17. Lou Rawls
18. Cannonball Adderley *
19. Oscar Brown Jr.
20. Curtis Amy / Paul Bryant Quintet
21. Mark Murphy
22. Firehouse Five Plus Two
23. Big Miller
24. Vi Redd
25. Ben Pollack
26. Jimmy Smith *
* indicates those subsequently issued on VHS.
