= James Hurt =

American jazz musician

James Maurice Hurt Jr is an American jazz pianist.

== Early life ==
Hurt had early training as a drummer.

== Career ==
Hurt was a member of Sherman Irby's quartet that played regularly at Smalls Jazz Club in New York City in the late 1990s. Gregory Tardy wrote a song after him, entitled "Mr. Hurt"; the pair played with Rashied Ali in 1999.

In the 1990s, Hurt played on albums with Antonio Hart (Here I Stand), Abbey Lincoln (Wholly Earth), and Russell Gunn.

His own first album was Dark Grooves – Mystical Rhythms on Blue Note Records in 1999. In a review of the album, James Lien of CMJ New Music Report called Hurt "one of the more adventurous young pianists to recently emerge on the New York scene." Calvin Wilson of The Kansas City Star described the album as "at once boldly experimental and totally accessible."

James has played with Elizabeth Kontomanou, Graham Haynes, DJ Logic, and composer, percussionist, and conductor Adam Rudolph (as a percussionist),

Hurt has made guest appearances with Donald Edwards, Stacy Dillard, and Rudresh Mahanthappa.

Hurt has been a piano tutor at the New School for Jazz and Contemporary Music.

== Discography ==
As leader

- Dark Grooves, Mystical Rhythms (Blue Note, 1999)

As sideman

- Russell Gunn, Gunn Fu (HighNote, 1997)
- Antonio Hart, Here I Stand (Impulse!/GRP, 1997)
- Sherman Irby, Full Circle (Blue Note, 1997)
- Sherman Irby, Big Mama's Biscuits (Blue Note, 1998)
- Abbey Lincoln, Wholly Earth (Verve/Gitanes Jazz, 1998 [1999])
- Russell Gunn, Love Requiem (HighNote, 1999)
- Jeffery Smith, Down Here Below (Verve, 1999)
- DJ Spinna, Here to There (Rapster, 2002)
- DJ Spinna, Outta Time featuring the Free Radikalz (Papa, 2004)
- DJ Spinna, Intergalactic Soul (Wonderwax, 2006)
