= Santaishan Palaung Ethnic Township =

Santaishan Palaung Ethnic Township 三台山德昂族乡
- Ethnic Township
- Location of the township region in Mangshi

- Location in Yunnan
- Coordinates: 24.337238°N 98.398963°E
- Country: People's Republic of China
- Province: Yunnan
- Prefecture-level city: Dehong Dai and Jingpo Autonomous Prefecture
- County-level city: Mangshi

Area
  - Total: 158 km^{2} (61 sq mi)

Population (2017)
  - Total: 7,410
  - Density: 46.9/km^{2} (121/sq mi)
- Time zone: UTC+08:00 (China Standard)
- Postal code: 678407
- Area code: 0692

Santaishan Palaung Ethnic Township (simplified Chinese: 三台山德昂族乡; traditional Chinese: 三臺山德昂族鄉; pinyin: Sāntáishān Dé'ángzú Xiāng) is an ethnic township in Mangshi, Yunnan, China. At the 2017 census it had a population of 7,410 and an area of 158 square kilometres (61 sq mi). It is bordered to the north by Xuangang Township, to the east by the towns of Mengga and Fengping, to the south by Zhefang Town, to the west by Wuchalu Township, and to the northwest by Town.

== Administrative divisions ==
As of December 2015, the township is divided into 4 villages:

- Bangwai (帮外村)
- Mengdan (勐丹村)
- Chudonggua (出冬瓜村)
- Yunqian (允欠村)

== History ==
The township was set up in January 1988.

== Geography ==
The highest elevation is 1,473-metre (4,833 ft) and the lowest is 800.5-metre (2,626 ft).

The township is in the low-heat hilly climate in South Asia tropic zone, with an average annual temperature of 16.9 °C (62.4 °F), total annual rainfall of 1,700-millimetre (67 in), and annual average sunshine hours in 2000 to 4000 hours. The highest temperature is 31 °C (88 °F), and the lowest temperature is 0 °C (32 °F).

== Economy ==
The local economy is primarily based upon agriculture and animal husbandry.

== Transport ==
The town is connected to two highways: the National Highway G56, which heads southwest to Ruili City and G320, which heads northeast to the Dehong Mangshi Airport and the down Mangshi City.
