= Tortured Soul (band) =

American jazz fusion band

- Origin: Brooklyn, New York, United States
- Genres: Electronica, New York house, classic disco
- Years active: 2001–present
- Members: John-Christian Urich, Jordan Scanella, Isamu MacGregor
- Past members: Ethan White, Jason JKriv Kriveloff
- Website: www.torturedsoulmusic.com

Tortured Soul is a music group from Brooklyn, New York, United States, comprising composer, singer and drummer John-Christian Urich, bass player Jordan Scannella and keyboard player Isamu MacGregor.

== History ==
Tortured Soul's origins date back to 2001 while Urich was steering Cooly's Hot Box, an acid jazz outfit also featuring indie soul vocalist Angela Johnson. After putting Cooly's Hot Box on hiatus, Urich composed Might Do Something Wrong which was picked up by New York-based deep house label Central Park Recordings. A mix of the track by Osunlade was used at Club Shelter and became the first piece of a full-length disc.

Urich began playing his compositions "Might Do Something Wrong", "When You Find Your Love Hold On", "Fall In Love" and "How's Your Life" with his bandmates from the rhythm section of NYC's acid-jazz band Topaz: bassist Jason "JKriv" Kriveloff and keyboardist Ethan White. Eventually they broke away to form the trio Tortured Soul. They began touring in 2003. They played the Montreal Jazz Festival, Zouk Singapore, Bonnaroo in Tennessee, Fabric in London, and the Cape Town International Jazz Festival in South Africa. They performed with Chaka Khan, The Wailers, The Brand New Heavies, and Pharcyde.

A succession of 12-inch singles followed Might Do Something Wrong, including Alix Alvarez's mix of How's Your Life, and Fall in Love. The band's 2006 Introducing Tortured Soul was a compilation of previously released singles and a few new studio recordings. The follow-up album, 2009's Did You Miss Me, was released on the band's own label, TSTC Records. Home to You, In My Fantasy and Your Dream Is My Dream were released as 12″ and 7″ singles. Mixes were contributed by Mark de Clive-Lowe, Quentin Harris, Jon Cutler, DJ Spinna, Dimitri From Paris and Tom Moulton. In 2015 the band released a third album, Hot For Your Love Tonight, with a music video for the single "Don't Lead Me On". Most recently two new singles, "Makin' Me Better" and "U Live 2 Far Away", along with remixes of both by JKriv, Lounge Lizards, Ron Trent and more.

In 2010, Kriveloff departed the group to focus on his new record label. Ethan White died unexpectedly in 2015.

Urich continues to compose and tour as Tortured Soul with the help of bassist Jordan Scanella and keyboardist Isamu MacGregor.

Tortured Soul have played at the Cape Town Jazz Festival (South Africa), Java Jazz Festival (Indonesia), Detroit Electronic Music Festival (USA), Pukkelpop (Belgium), Big Chill Festival (UK) and Montreal International Jazz Festival (Canada). Within the US, they've played at Bonnaroo, Milwaukee's Summerfest and at live venues such as Hollywood's Vanguard, Chicago's Double Door, Atlanta's Center Stage and Washington D.C.’s 930 Club.

AllMusicGuide wrote that Tortured Soul's songs are unapologetically poppy, explaining why their music has appeared on All My Children, A&E's The Glades, Showtime's Huff and Canada's version of So You Think You Can Dance. Over the years Tortured Soul’s music has been documented on a range of dance compilations and has been licensed to Universal Japan, Defected, BMG Ariola, and Dome, among others.

== Personnel ==
- John-Christian Urich - drums and vocals
- Ethan White - keyboards
- Jordan Scannella - bass

== Discography ==
=== Albums ===
- Introducing Tortured Soul (TSTC Records, Purpose Records, 2004)
- Tortured Soul (TSTC Records, 2008)
- Choice Cuts (TSTC Records, 2011)
- Did You Miss Me (TSTC Records, 2013)
- Undercover Remixes (Mixed by Jask) (TSTC Records, 2013)
- Hot for Your Love Tonight (TSTC Records, 2015)
- Take the Day Off (TSTC Records, 2022)

=== Singles and EPs ===
- Can't Keep Rhythm From A Dancer (TSTC Records)
- Home to You, The Remixes: Part I (TSTC Records)
- Home to You, The Remixes: Part IU (TSTC Records)
- I Might Do Something Wrong (TSTC Records)
- I Know What's On Your Mind (TSTC Records)
- Home (feat Tortured Soul Remixes) (TSTC Records)
- Single: Dirty (Original Mixes) (TSTC Records)
- Dirty - The Remixes (TSTC Records)
- In My Fantasy, incl. DJ Spinna Mix (TSTC Records)
- Did You Miss Me: feat Mark de Clive-Lowe Mix (TSTC Records)
- Another Lover (Incl. Dimitri from Paris Mixes) (TSTC Records)
- "Makin' Me Better" (remixes by Malachi, Cryosis, Lea) (TSTC Records)
- "U Live 2 Far Away" (remixes by JCU, Ron Trent, Cryosis, Cornelius Mashilane, Lounge Lizards, JKriv) (TSTC Records)
