= A Roller Skating Jam Named "Saturdays" =

Single by De La Soul

from the album De La Soul Is Dead
- B-side: "What Yo Life Can Truly Be"
- Released: July 23, 1991
- Genre: Hip hop
- Length: 4:02 (album version); 3:59 (radio edit)
- Label: Tommy Boy
- Songwriters: Kelvin Mercer; Paul Huston; David Jolicoeur; Vincent Mason; Kamal Fareed; Robert Lamm; Barry Gibb; Rodney Mathews
- Producer: Prince Paul

De La Soul singles chronology
"Ring Ring Ring (Ha Ha Hey)" (1991)	"A Roller Skating Jam Named "Saturdays"" (1991)	"Millie Pulled a Pistol on Santa/Keepin' the Faith" (1991)

Music video
- "A Roller Skating Jam Named 'Saturdays''" on YouTube

"A Roller Skating Jam Named 'Saturdays'" is a song by American hip hop trio De La Soul, released on July 23, 1991 by Tommy Boy Records as the second single from their second studio album, De La Soul Is Dead (1991). The track includes vocal contributions from rapper Q-Tip, R&B singer Vinia Mojica and entrepreneur Russell Simmons. The track's composition is built around many samples. The song was generally well-received by critics. The song peaked at number twenty-two on the UK Singles Chart and at numbers six and forty three on the US Billboard Hot Dance Club Play and Hot R&B/Hip Hop Songs charts respectively.

== Conception and composition ==
The song's lyrics were written by Paul "Prince Paul" Huston, Kelvin "Posdnuos" Mercer, David "Dave" Jude Jolicoeur, Vincent "Maseo" Mason and Jonathan "Q-Tip" Davis, and produced by Prince Paul. The title of the song derives from the roller skating fad of the 1970s.

Posdnuos and Dave of the group rap verses on the track, and other musical contributions are made by rapper Q-Tip, who raps the first verse of the track and vocalist Vinia Mojica, who sings the chorus. The intro of the song features Def Jam co-founder Russell Simmons - in non-musical capacity - as a DJ from fictional radio station "WRMS". The song is considered a collaboration from the Native Tongues posse, as De La Soul, Q-Tip and Mojica are all members.

The themes of the song's lyrics revolve around roller skating and the joy of weekends, compared to darker themes explored throughout De La Soul Is Dead to try to debunk their "daisy-age" image caused by the themes of their previous album 3 Feet High and Rising. Because of this, the track has been described as one of the more light-hearted tracks on the album.

== Critical reception ==
Sally Margaret Joy from Melody Maker named "A Roller Skating Jam Named 'Saturdays'" Single of the Week, writing, "De La Soul return to their natural home, Cartoonland, on this homage to disco pubescence. Here, everything is temperate, smooth and depthless. All is visible, the trees and houses are all regular, the lawns all manicured and there are no snags in the road to ruin your skating, which is cool. This is the sunniest track on De La Soul Is Dead and though there's the occasional jagged tear in the strip—Erection brings bad boys joys—it's safe to roam in its world, where even the washing up sings to you." Pan-European magazine Music & Media felt it has "a relaxing lazy beat", adding, "Guest singer Vinija Mojica plays the leading role. "Grease" by Frankie Valli is the most prominent sample they use this time." Love LX Paterson from NME said, "Try it on roller skates with skunk at the weekend."

== Track listing ==
- 12" single/cassette single

A1. "What Yo Life Can Truly Be" (featuring A Tribe Called Quest, Chosen Few, and Dres) - 4:58
A2. "Who's Skatin' Promo" (featuring Big Daddy Kane, Dres and Russell Simmons) - 2:48
A3. "A Roller Skating Jam Named 'Saturdays'" (Ladies Nite Decision) (featuring Q-Tip) - 4:11
A4. "A Roller Skating Jam Named 'Saturdays'" (LP Version) (featuring Q-Tip) - 4:02
B1. "A Roller Skating Jam Named 'Saturdays'" (Radio Home Mix) (featuring Q-Tip) - 3:42
B2. "A Roller Skating Jam Named 'Saturdays'" (Dave's Home Mix) (featuring Q-Tip) - 6:23
B3. "A Roller Skating Jam Named 'Saturdays'" (6:00 AM Mix) (featuring Q-Tip) - 6:07
B4. "A Roller Skating Jam Named "Saturdays" (Mo Mo Dub) (featuring Q-Tip) - 6:03

- 7" single

A. "A Roller Skating Jam Named 'Saturdays'" (Disco Fever Edit) - 4:04
B. "A Roller Skating Jam Named 'Saturdays'" (Radio Home Mix) 3:42

- CD single
1. "A Roller Skating Jam Named 'Saturdays'" (LP Version) (featuring Q-Tip) - 4:02
2. "A Roller Skating Jam Named 'Saturdays'" (Radio Home Mix) (featuring Q-Tip) - 3:42
3. "A Roller Skating Jam Named "Saturdays" (Ladies Nite Decision) (featuring Q-Tip) - 4:11
4. "A Roller Skating Jam Named 'Saturdays'" (6:00 AM Mix) (featuring Q-Tip) - 6:07
5. "Who's Skatin' Promo" (featuring Big Daddy Kane, Dres and Russell Simmons) - 2:48
6. "A Roller Skating Jam Named 'Saturdays'" (Dave's Home Mix) (featuring Q-Tip) - 6:23
7. "What Yo Life Can Truly Be" (featuring A Tribe Called Quest and Dres) - 4:58
8. "A Roller Skating Jam Named "Saturdays" (Mo Mo Dub) (featuring Q-Tip) - 6:03

== Charts ==
=== Weekly charts ===
Chart (1991)	Peak Position
Australia (ARIA)	54
Belgium (Ultratop 50 Flanders)	25
Denmark (IFPI)	6
Europe (European Dance Radio)	3
Germany (GfK)	37
Netherlands (Single Top 100)	22
Netherlands (Dutch Top 40)	23
New Zealand (Recorded Music NZ)	4
Switzerland (Schweizer Hitparade)	17
UK Singles (OCC)	22
UK Airplay (Music Week)	20
UK Dance (Music Week)	5
UK Club Chart (Record Mirror)	5
US Hot R&B/Hip-Hop Songs (Billboard)	43
US Hot Dance Club Play (Billboard)	6

=== Year-end charts ===
Chart (1991)	Position
UK Club Chart (Record Mirror)	81

Chart (1992)	Position
Brazil (Crowley)	95
