= Alvester Garnett =

American jazz musician

- Born: July 17, 1970 (age 54); Richmond, Virginia, U.S.
- Genres: Jazz
- Instruments: Drums

Alvester Garnett (born July 17, 1970) is an American jazz drummer who, among many other productions, has appeared on Great Performances on PBS in a tribute to Kurt Weill. Garnett has played with Abbey Lincoln, Betty Carter, Regina Carter, Clark Terry, Pharoah Sanders, Dee Dee Bridgewater, Teddy Edwards, James Carter, Cyrus Chestnut, Charenee Wade, Lou Donaldson, Benny Golson, Al Grey, Rodney Jones, and Sherman Irby, and others.

== Discography ==
=== As sideman ===
With Regina Carter

- 2000 Motor City Moments
- 2003 Paganini: After a Dream
- 2006 I'll Be Seeing You: A Sentimental Journey
- 2010 Reverse Thread
- 2014 Southern Comfort
- 2017 Ella: Accentuate the Positive

With Abbey Lincoln

- 1996 Who Used to Dance
- 1999 Wholly Earth

With others

- 1996 Earth Stories, Cyrus Chestnut
- 1998 A Cloud of Red Dust, Stefon Harris
- 1998 In Carterian Fashion, James Carter (Atlantic)
- 1999 Rhapsody, Paul Kendall
- 2000 Shades of Blue, Anna-Lisa
- 2003 Timeless, Loston Harris
- 2006 Organ Starter, Sherman Irby
- 2009 In My Life, Rondi Charleston
- 2010 Three's Company, Bill Cunliffe/Holly Hofmann
