= Wholly Earth =

Studio album by Abbey Lincoln
- Released: 1999
- Recorded: June 3–5, 1998
- Studio: Avatar Studios, New York City
- Genre: Jazz
- Length: 1:08:29
- Label: Verve, Gitanes Jazz; 559 538-2
- Producer: Jean-Philippe Allard

Abbey Lincoln chronology
Who Used to Dance (1997)	Wholly Earth (1999)	Over the Years (2000)

Wholly Earth is an album by jazz vocalist Abbey Lincoln. Featuring seven original songs, it was recorded during June 3–5, 1998, at Avatar Studios in New York City, and was released in 1999 by Verve Records and Gitanes Jazz Productions. On the album, Lincoln is joined by a core group consisting of vibraphonist Bobby Hutcherson, pianist Marc Cary, double bassist John Ormond, and drummer Alvester Garnett, plus guests Nicholas Payton (trumpet and flugelhorn), James Hurt (piano), Michael Bowie (double bass), Daniel Moreno (percussion), and Maggie Brown (vocals).

== Reception ==
Professional ratings
Review scores
Source	Rating
AllMusic	3/5 stars
The Austin Chronicle	4/5 stars
The Penguin Guide to Jazz	3.5/4 stars
The Virgin Encyclopedia of Jazz	4/5 stars

In a review for AllMusic, Tim Sheridan noted that although "the ravages of time have taken their toll" on Lincoln's voice, "the album has many fine moments" and "her band is particularly fine."

The authors of The Penguin Guide to Jazz Recordings praised Lincoln's "ability to make large harmonic shifts and reshuffle the tempo," and wrote: "The voice is now so confidently intimate, so easily conversational, that it becomes difficult to think of Lincoln in terms of 'performance'."

Geoffrey Himes of The Washington Post stated: "her writing proves every bit as impressive as her singing... her words prove fresh and clever without ever losing their conversational flow or their comfortable fit with the insinuating melodies... Lincoln proves that gifted singers can evolve into gifted songwriters in jazz as well as in pop."

Writing for Time, Bruce Handy commented: "Lincoln may be jazz's most prolific singer-songwriter... But the voice is why you should care. Lincoln's phrasing can sound eccentric, even perverse, yet few vocalists can rival her ability to convey pure emotion–by turns rueful, reflective and exultant. She has been on a roll in the '90s and shows no signs of stopping."

In an article for The Atlantic, Bob Blumenthal called the album "another lesson in how to mesmerize and instruct," and remarked: "To a gritty voice that recalls Billy Holiday in texture and emotional commitment, Lincoln adds personal magnetism and a knack for fashioning programs as surely paced as they are eccentric."

A reviewer for CMJ New Music Report described the album as "one of those truly special releases that comes along only once in a great while," and wrote: "Every time [Lincoln] takes on a new tune, she imbues it with depth, resonance and shades of meaning that often go beyond simple performance into the realm of the sublime. And what adjective can one use to describe Wholly Earth other than sublime?"

The Austin Chronicle's Raoul Hernandez called the recording "a deep, rich, ultimately sublime work that's sure to stand among the 69-year-old singer's finest albums," and stated: "her songs, lyrics, and voice -- cured by age like an antique mahogany armoire -- channel Wholly Mother Earth herself."

Jim Santella of All About Jazz commented: "Pronouncing the words slowly and deliberately, phrasing with a natural conversational style, slurring some syllables for effect, and remaining slightly off the beat, Lincoln captures your mind and heart with her performance... Lincoln continues to impress with her unique easy-to-love ballad style and lucid storytelling manner."

== Track listing ==
1. "And It's Supposed to Be Love" (Abbey Lincoln) – 5:13
2. "Midnight Sun" (Lionel Hampton, Sonny Burke, Johnny Mercer) – 7:23
3. "Wholly Earth" (Abbey Lincoln) – 6:01
4. "Look to the Star" (Abbey Lincoln) – 6:42
5. "Another World" (Abbey Lincoln) – 9:13
6. "Conversations With a Baby" (Abbey Lincoln) – 6:37
7. "If I Only Had a Brain" (Harold Arlen, Yip Harburg) – 5:32
8. "Another Time, Another Place" (Benny Carter) – 7:16
9. "Caged Bird" (Abbey Lincoln) – 7:02
10. "Learning How to Listen" (Abbey Lincoln) – 6:29

== Personnel ==
- Abbey Lincoln – vocals
- Bobby Hutcherson – vibraphone, marimba
- Marc Cary – piano (tracks 2–8, 10)
- John Ormond – double bass (tracks 2–8, 10)
- Alvester Garnett – drums

Guests

- Nicholas Payton – trumpet, flugelhorn
- James Hurt – piano (tracks 1, 9)
- Michael Bowie – double bass (tracks 1, 9)
- Daniel Moreno – percussion (tracks 1, 3, 5, 6, 9)
- Maggie Brown – vocals (tracks 1, 9)
