= Stars of Jazz =

Stars of Jazz is an American television program that ran between 1956 and 1958 and features performances and interviews with many leading jazz performers of the time. The innovative program started on KABC-TV in Los Angeles in June 1956. It was produced by Jimmie Baker, and presented by pianist and songwriter Bobby Troup.

The show features top California-based jazz musicians, and those visiting the area, in performance and conversation. It also includes experimental films by Charles and Ray Eames, and visual effects such as the use of a cucoloris, artists creating works on camera inspired by the music, and views of oscilloscope waveforms.

The program proved popular, and won critical praise and awards, including an Emmy. Troup said of the show: "We present the musicians as men of stature. We try to enlighten our audience about the history and techniques of jazz. If we take the music of a certain period or a certain performer, we do our best to show all sides of it." The show's success led to it being networked nationally by ABC between April and November 1958.

Musicians who appeared on the show included Oscar Peterson, Billie Holiday, Art Blakey, Dave Brubeck, Stan Getz, Art Pepper, Chico Hamilton, Mel Torme, Anita O'Day, Kid Ory, Chet Baker, and Troup's wife Julie London. All 130 shows were filmed as kinescopes, but all but 45 were later lost. The remaining films were donated to the UCLA Film and Television Archive, where they are gradually being restored. Audio performances from some of the shows were released as Sessions, Live on the Calliope Records label in the late 1970s.

A book of photographs from the show, Stars of Jazz, identifying all the musicians and songs performed on the show, was published in 1997. The photographs were taken by Ray Avery.
