= Oscar Brown =

American singer-songwriter, actor, civil rights activist (1926–2005)

Oscar Brown Jr.
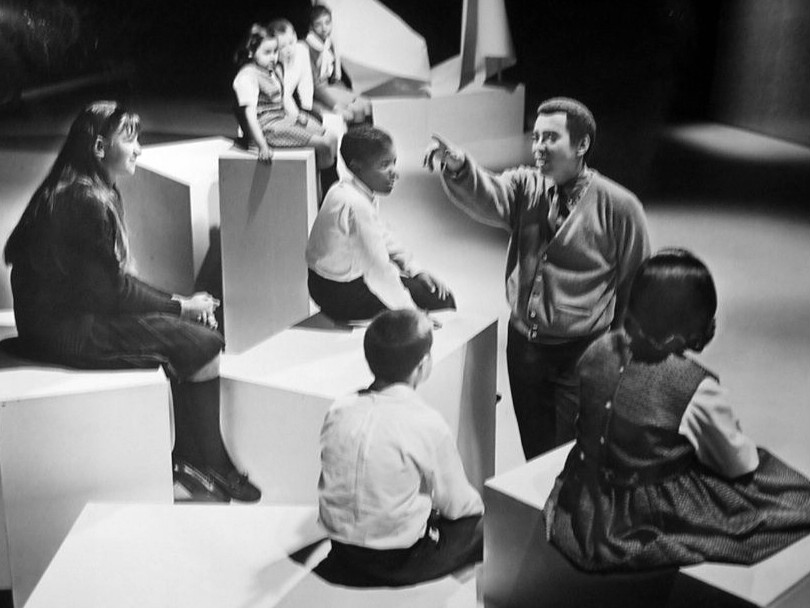
- Brown performing on the CBS public affairs TV show Look Up and Live, 1965
- Born: October 10, 1926; Chicago, Illinois, U.S.
- Died: May 29, 2005 (aged 78); Chicago, Illinois, U.S.
- Occupations: Singer; songwriter; actor; playwright; poet; activist
- Years active: 1960–2005
- Children: Oscar "BoBo" Brown III; Maggie Brown; Africa Pace Brown
- Parent: Oscar Brown Sr.
- Family: Grant Wilson Baker (musician)
- Musical career
- Genres: Jazz
- Instrument: Vocals
- Labels: Columbia; Fontana; RCA Victor; Atlantic

Oscar Brown Jr. (October 10, 1926 – May 29, 2005) was an American singer, songwriter, playwright, poet, actor, and civil rights activist (Brown was African-American). Aside from his career, Brown ran unsuccessfully for office in both the Illinois state legislature and the U.S. Congress. Brown wrote many songs (125 have been published), 12 albums, and more than a dozen musical plays.

== Early life and education ==
Brown was born in Chicago, Illinois, to Helen (née Clark) and Oscar Brown Sr., an attorney and real estate broker. His acting debut came on the Chicago radio show Secret City at the age of 15. After graduating from Englewood High School, Brown attended first the University of Wisconsin–Madison and then Lincoln University in Pennsylvania, but he dropped out of college and never returned.

During Brown's twenties, he worked as the "world's first Black newscaster" for Negro Newsfront, a Chicago radio program that he co-produced with Vernon Jarrett. He worked briefly in real estate and public relations before running for political offices: for the Illinois Legislature in 1948 through the Progressive Party, and for the U. S. House of Representatives as a Republican in 1952. During this period, 1946 to 1956, he was a member of the Communist Party USA; he quit when he decided that he was "just too black to be red". Later he served two years in the U. S. Army.

== Career ==
=== Radio ===
Brown was a contributor to the weekly WMAQ Chicago radio series Destination Freedom (written by Richard Durham) both during its early years (1948–1949) and in the 1950 revival.

=== Music ===
Brown's father intended for him to follow in his footsteps and become a practicing lawyer. While Brown did help his father at his practice, he ventured off into other careers such as advertising and served in the US Army in the mid-1950s. He also wrote songs.

In the early 1950s, Brown was hired as a copy-writer by a small Chicago advertising company on Rush Street, Gershuny and Associates, owned by Sam Gershuny and Sheldon Sosna. At that time, Rush Street was totally segregated, and Sam and Shelly took him to Adolf's, an upscale Italian restaurant. As soon as they walked in, the owner sent a busboy to inform that the boss "did not want to serve Negroes in his restaurant". However, they refused to leave until he finally decided to serve them. They repeated this activity in many restaurants on Rush Street. A fraternity brother of Gershuny and Sosna owned a string of hotels and approached them about advertising his hotels, by sponsoring two hours of the news in the morning on a black radio station. They decided to make Oscar Brown Jr. the disc jockey for the segment, from 5:30 to 7:30 in the morning. Unfortunately, they discovered Oscar not arriving on time. Also, Brown would make politically controversial comments about the on-going Korean War. As a result, he was released from the job.

When Mahalia Jackson recorded one of his songs, "Brown Baby", he began to focus on a career as a songwriter. His first major contribution to a recorded work was a collaboration with Max Roach, We Insist! (1960), which was an early record celebrating the black freedom movement in the United States. Columbia Records signed Brown as a solo artist, who was by now in his mid-thirties and married with five children.

In January 1961, Brown released his first LP, Sin & Soul, recorded from June 20 to October 23, 1960. Printed on the cover of the album were personal reviews by well-known celebrities and jazz musicians of the time, including Steve Allen, Lorraine Hansberry, Nat Hentoff, Dorothy Killgallen, Max Roach and Nina Simone (Simone would later cover his "Work Song" and Steve Allen would later hire him for his Jazz Scene USA television program). The album is regarded as a "true classic" for openly tackling the experiences of African Americans with songs such as "Bid 'Em In" and "Afro Blue". Sin & Soul is also significant because Brown took several popular jazz instrumentals and combined them with self-penned lyrics on songs such as "Dat Dere", "Afro Blue" and "Work Song". This began a trend that would continue with several other major jazz vocalists. Several of the tracks from Sin & Soul were embraced by the 1960s Mod movement, such as "Humdrum Blues", and "Work Song". Sin & Soul was followed by Between Heaven and Hell (1962). The success of Sin & Soul meant that much more money was spent on production, and Quincy Jones and Ralph Burns were bought in to handle the arrangements.

However, Brown was soon to fall down the pecking order at Columbia following a rearrangement of the management at the company. His third album was notable for the lack of any self-composed songs, and Columbia was having a hard time packaging him as an artist. They were unsure whether Brown was suited to middle-of-the-road/easy listening nightclubs or alternatively should be presented as a jazz artist. Brown was given much more creative freedom for his fourth album, Tells It Like It Is (1963), and he was back to his creative best, composing songs such as "The Snake", which became a Northern soul classic when it was covered by Al Wilson, and has featured on several adverts. Despite this return to form, and having been told by the new head of Columbia, that he was high on the company's priorities, his contract at Columbia was not renewed.

=== Stage and television ===
Brown attempted to mount a major musical stage show in New York City called Kicks & Co. in 1961. Host Dave Garroway turned over an entire broadcast of the Today show to Brown to perform numbers from the show and try to raise the necessary funds to launch it on the stage. Kicks & Co. is set on an all-African-American college campus in the American South during the early days of attempted desegregation. The character Mr. Kicks is an emissary of Satan, sent to try to derail these efforts in which the play's protagonist, Ernest Black, has become involved. This was the first of several theatrical endeavors by Brown, and like all of them, the public was not won over sufficiently to allow financial success, despite acclaim by some critics. His longest-running relative success, thanks to the participation of Muhammad Ali, was Buck White. Another notable musical show, Joy, saw two incarnations (in 1966 and 1969) and again addressed social issues. Appearing with Brown were his wife, Jean Pace, and the Brazilian singer/accordionist Sivuca. RCA released the original cast recording around 1970; it is long out of print. In 1962, Brown worked on the Westinghouse syndicated television program Jazz Scene USA, produced by Steve Allen. Brown was the show's presenter and it featured a new musical guest each week. Brown sang the theme for the 1970 drama series Bird of the Iron Feather, the first all-Black television soap opera.

== Personal life ==
Brown was married to Jean Pace, the elder sister of actress Judy Pace. He was the father of seven children. His son Oscar "BoBo" Brown III was a bassist and musical arranger who died in a car crash in August 1996. His daughter, Maggie, is a singer. A Chicago musical review referred to the trio as "The First Family of Swing". They were joined by the youngest daughter, Africa Pace Brown, in an effort to popularize his music. Brown's first son, Napoleon "David" Brown, inspired the song "Brown Baby" and helped his father promotional appearances and business. The remaining family members consist of Donna Brown Kane, Joan Olivia Brown, and Iantha Brown Casen, who participated in some of her father's production.

On May 29, 2005, Oscar Brown died in his hometown of Chicago from osteomyelitis at the age of 78.

== Humanitarian work ==
Brown founded the Oscar Brown Jr. H.I.P. Legacy Foundation to continue his humanitarian work. He participated in an anti-apartheid protest rally in Compton College in 1976.

Brown wrote the vocalese lyrics to the Duke Pearson melody "Jeannine" as sung by Eddie Jefferson on the album The Main Man recorded in October 1974 and covered by The Manhattan Transfer on their 1984 album Bop Doo-Wopp. "Somebody Buy Me a Drink", a track from Sin & Soul, was covered by David Johansen and the Harry Smiths on their eponymous first album. "Hymn to Friday" from Between Heaven and Hell is played on jazz radio stations such as WDCB. Pianist Wynton Kelly recorded "Strongman" with his trio in the late 1950s. Nina Simone popularized Brown's lyrics to "Work Song".

Brown's lyrics to "Afro Blue" have been performed by Abbey Lincoln Dianne Reeves, Dee Dee Bridgewater, and Lizz Wright. Vocalist Karrin Allyson cited Brown as an inspiration and has performed his compositions on several of her albums. Brown was scheduled to contribute lyrics to Allyson's 2006 album Footprints before his death; instead, she recorded his songs "A Tree and Me" and "But I Was Cool" as a tribute.

Brown was the subject of a 2006 tribute album by cabaret singer Linda Kosut, entitled .Long As You're Living - The Songs & Poetry of Oscar Brown Jr.

== Published works ==
=== Books ===
- What It Is: Poems and Opinions of Oscar Brown Jr. This book includes lyrics to some of Brown's better-known songs, as well as lyrics to songs he never got to record.

=== Discography ===
- Sin & Soul (Columbia, January 1961)
- In a New Mood (Columbia, 1962)
- Between Heaven and Hell (Columbia, 1962)
- Tells It Like It Is! (Columbia, 1963)
- Mr. Oscar Brown Jr. Goes to Washington (Fontana, 1965)
- Finding a New Friend, with Luiz Henrique (Fontana, 1966)
- Joy, with Jean Pace, Sivuca (RCA Victor, 1970)
- Movin' On (Atlantic, 1972)
- Fresh (Atlantic, 1974)
- Brother Where Are You (Atlantic, 1974)
- Live Every Minute (Minor Music, 1998)

=== Musicals ===
- Kicks & Co.
- Oscar Brown Jr. Entertains (one-man show in London, England, 1963)
- Lyrics of Sunshine and Shadow
- Summer in the City
- Opportunity Please Knock
- Joy '66; Joy '69
- Big-Time Buck White (starring Muhammad Ali, featuring song "We Came in Chains")
- Slave Song
- Oscar Brown Jr.'s Back in Town

=== Songs ===
- "The Snake"
- "Work Song" (lyrics to Nat Adderley's music)
- "All Blues" (lyrics to Miles Davis' music)
- "Dat Dere" (lyrics to Bobby Timmons' music)
- "Afro Blue" (lyrics to Mongo Santamaría's music, sometimes recorded by others without crediting the lyricist)
- "The Lone Ranger" (Billboard, No. 69 – peaked on June 15, 1974)
- "Signifyin’ Monkey" (recorded on Sin & Soul)
- "Forty Acres and a Mule"
- "Brother Where Are You"
- "Brown Baby"
- "World Full of Gray"
- "But I Was Cool"
- "The Tree and Me"
- "A Ladiesman"
- "A Young Girl" (lyrics to French song "Une Enfant", by Charles Aznavour)
- "Long As You're Living" (lyrics to Julian Priester & Tommy Turrentine's music)

== Media appearances ==
- Negro Newsfront (1940s), radio show
- Tonight Starring Steve Allen (c. 1960)
- The Today Show with Dave Garroway (c. 1960)
- Jazz Scene USA (1962), television show – host
- The Dick Cavett Show (1970), with Jean Pace and Sivuca from the Broadway musical Joy
- Stony Island (1978 film) – actor
- From Jump Street: The Story of Black Music (early 1980s) – 13-part public TV series, USA [host]
- Def Poetry Season 2 (2002) [poet]
