= Maggie Brown (singer) =

American singer

- Born: February 10, 1963 (age 63); Chicago, Illinois, U.S.
- Education: Columbia College Chicago
- Occupations: Singer; spoken word artist; music producer
- Years active: 1995–present
- Parents: Oscar Brown Jr.; Maxine Fleming
- Relatives: Oscar Brown III (brother); Grant Wilson Baker (musician); Africa Pace Brown (sister)
- Musical career
- Genres: Jazz; blues; R&B; soul; spoken word
- Instruments: Vocals

Maggie Brown (born February 10, 1963) is an American singer, spoken word artist, and music producer. Brown sings in many genres: jazz, blues, R&B, soul, and spoken word. Her singing style has been described by James Walker as "transcend[ing] limitations and genres, while still maintaining her unique unmistakable voice." She is the daughter of Oscar Brown Jr., and was mentored by him and Abbey Lincoln. She uses music to educate, what she calls "edutainment", a word that she learned from her father. She gives talks and demonstrations on music and African American musical history. She performs with her sister, Africa Brown. They perform their work and their father's work.

== Early life ==
Born in Chicago, Illinois and raised in the Hyde Park neighborhood, Brown grew up in a musical household, experiencing rehearsals and jam sessions. Brown is the daughter of Oscar Brown Jr. and Maxine Fleming. She studied music, theater and voice at Columbia College Chicago. Brown was 15 when she had her professional debut. Her professional debut was at the Body Politic Theatre in Chicago.

== Career ==
In 1995, Brown established her own independent record label Mag Pie Records. Brown published her first album From My Window in 1995. It was nominated for a Chicago Music Award for Best Jazz CD in 1995. In 1996 she was nominated for another Chicago Music Award for Best Jazz Performer. In 1998, Brown performed at the Schomburg Center in Harlem, New York City with her father Oscar Brown Jr. That same year, she did a vocal duet with Abby Lincoln on the album Wholly Earth, released in 1999 by the Verve label. She has performed duets with Jonathan Butler, on Urban Knights album, Urban Knights II. Brown has a traveling one-woman show called 'Legacy'. Her one-woman show chronicles the history and evolution of African American music. The show encompasses a wide range of musical forms and genres. She has toured for over 19 years with her one-woman show, Legacy: Our Wealth of Music. She uses art to educate the young and the old about life, history, and music. In 2015 the Brown family, and Maggie and Africa Brown performed at the naming of Harper Street, between 52nd and 53rd as Oscar Brown Jr. Way.

In 2016, Brown and her sister Africa Brown worked together to revive the Blue Gargoyle; a Hyde Park community center. The community center closed in 2009. It provided job training, social services, family counseling, music and art training. The art center dates back to 1965. The Brown sisters have developed community-based shows. Which is similar to the work that their father did giving exposure to young talent. In 1967 Oscar Brown Jr. collaborated with members of the Blackstone Rangers. The Blackstone Rangers a Gang in Chicago. They collaborated and created a musical called "Opportunity Please Knock". The first weeks of the show about 8,000 people attended which was performed at The First Presbyterian Church of Chicago.

== Personal life ==
Brown's aunt is actress Judy Pace.

Brown's recording of "The Snake", written by her father and recorded with her siblings Africa and Oscar III, was used by Donald Trump at rallies during his presidential campaign. The Brown family asked him not to use their father's song, which is about a woman who takes in an ailing snake that turns on her. Maggie Africa Brown stated that when Donald Trump read "The Snake" he was referring to the snakes as refugees and the caring woman as America. They disapproved of the analogy.

== Awards and nominations ==
- Chicago Music Awards nominated - Her first CD 'From My Window' was nominated for the Chicago Music Award.

== Affiliations ==
Eleven Jazzy Divas Studio Recordings with

- Kelan Phil Cohran
- Ramsey Lewis
- Stevie Wonder
- Abbey Lincoln
- Oscar Brown Jr (her father)
