= Jimmie Baker (television producer) =

James Hollan Baker (March 16, 1920 – February 3, 2003) was an American television producer and director, most noted for his work on jazz documentaries in the 1950s and 1960s.

== Biography ==
Born in Muskogee, Oklahoma, Baker appeared aged 15 as a tap dancer on CBS Radio's Major Bowes' Amateur Hour in New York City, winning a spot in a vaudeville touring company. He graduated from Central High School in Tulsa, and studied at Oklahoma State University, where he formed an eight-piece band, named by Down Beat magazine as the best college dance band in the U.S. During World War II, he led an Air Force band, Men of the Air, and prepared shows to entertain the troops, at one time working with Veronica Lake.

While at Oklahoma State University he was a member of The Pi Kappa Alpha Fraternity.

Following the war, he graduated from university, worked for some time as a high school teacher, and assembled a touring band, the Collegians. After the band split up, Baker moved to Hollywood, and found work with ABC. He initially worked in radio production, but by 1950 had started working in television. In 1956, he developed and produced the innovative show Stars of Jazz which won a local Emmy award and was networked nationally in 1958; and in 1962 he produced Steve Allen's Jazz Scene USA. His other productions included a 1962 documentary profile, The Duke Ellington Story, narrated by Raymond Burr, as well as other jazz documentaries; a jazz series, Music Is My Beat; a regular talk show in the late 1960s hosted by football star Roosevelt Grier; a documentary on Errol Flynn; the pilot for Laugh-In; and work on That's Entertainment!. He won five Emmys, an ACE Award for his work in cable television, and several Angel Awards "for television production advancing high ethical principles and constructive behavior."

Baker co-founded the Hollywood Motion Picture and Television Museum. In 1978, he was elected to the Oklahoma Journalism Hall of Fame. He was active in charitable foundations, both in California and Oklahoma, and volunteered as producer of the Oklahoma Hall of Fame Induction Ceremony for ten years.

In 2003 he died in hospital in Santa Monica, aged 82, from a heart attack following two earlier strokes.
