= Jigmastas =

American hip-hop group

- Origin: Brooklyn, New York, United States
- Genres: Underground hip-hop Hardcore hip-hop East Coast hip-hop Jazz rap
- Years active: 1996-present
- Labels: Beyond Real, Tommy Boy Black Label, Landspeed
- Members: DJ Spinna; Kriminul
- Website: www.beyondreal.org

Jigmastas are an East Coast underground hip-hop group based in Brooklyn. The group consists of DJ Spinna and MC Kriminul.

== History ==
DJ Spinna, was already renowned throughout the 1990s, and as well already knew Kriminul from the mid-1980s. Jigmastas' recording debut was in Rude Rydims' "Everybody Bounce" on Freeze Records in 1995. The duo released their first single "Beyond Real" which became an underground rap hit, and inspired the name of their self-funded record label, "Beyond Real Recordings," in 1996. To please their fans, Jigmastas released another single, "Last Will and Testimony" released by Tommy Boy Black Label and finally the debut LP album Grass Roots: Lyrical Fluctuation in 2000. In May 2001, the highly anticipated debut album Infectious featuring the former guitarist of Living Colour, Vernon Reid and rapper Sadat X.

== Discography ==
Title	Release date	Label
Grass Roots: Lyrical Fluctuations	2000	Beyond Real
Infectious	2001	Beyond Real/Landspeed
