= Shaun Escoffery =

British soul and R&B singer and actor

- Born: November 20, 1974 (age 50)
- Genres: British soul and R&B
- Instrument: Vocals

Shaun Escoffery is a British soul and R&B singer and actor.

His first major release was the single "Space Rider", released by Oyster Music in March 2001. It was played regularly by the BBC Radio 1 DJ Trevor Nelson and the Dreem Teem. It peaked at No. 52 in the UK Singles Chart, and was followed by the UK No. 53 hit "Days Like This" in 2002. After releasing several other singles on the same label, Escoffery became more noticed for his voice - being noticed by Lennox Lewis, who invited him to Memphis, Tennessee, to sing the national anthem before his boxing match with Mike Tyson.

In 2007, Escoffery released an album entitled Move into Soul, which included cover versions of "A Change Is Gonna Come" and "I Heard It Through the Grapevine". Also that year, he received a Laurence Olivier Award nomination for his work in the stage musical Parade, and the following year played Mufasa in a London production of The Lion King. Escoffery's other West End credits include Les Misérables, Smokey Joe's Café, Tommy and Mama I Want to Sing.

In 2014, Escoffery returned to the recording studio to release a new album, In the Red Room for Dome Records. The album is co-written and produced by Gil Cang, whose credits include writing "Whatever Happens" for Michael Jackson. The first single from the album, "Nature's Call", was released in August 2014 and entered the UK Airplay Top 30. Three further singles, "People", "Nobody Knows" and "Perfect Love Affair", also entered the UK Airplay chart. In September 2015 Escoffery appeared at BBC Radio 2's Live in Hyde Park festival, alongside Rod Stewart and Bryan Adams.

His album "Evergreen" – again co-written and produced by Gil Cang – was released in September 2016 on Dome/MVKA. The first two singles "When The Love is Gone" and "Love Shine Down" both entered the UK Airplay chart.

== Discography ==
- Shaun Escoffery (Oyster, 2002)
- Soulonica (Oyster, 2003)
- Move into Soul (Absolute, 2007)
- In the Red Room (Dome, 2014)
- Evergreen (G&S Music Shack/Dome, 2016)
- Strong Enough (Decca/Universal, 2020)

== Personal life ==
- Shaun enjoys training Gracie Jiujitsu, a martial art in which he holds the rank of black belt.
