= Linxiang =

Linxiang may refer to the following locations in China:

- Linxiang (臨湘), a former name of Changsha, a city in Hunan
- Linxiang, Hunan (临湘市), county-level city of Yueyang, Hunan
- Linxiang District (临翔区), Lincang, Yunnan

== See also ==
- Lin Xiang (林翔, born 1991), Chinese footballer
- Akira Hayashi (swimmer) (林 享, born 1974), Japanese breaststroke swimmer
