= Yingjiang =

Yingjiang may refer to:

- Yingjiang District, a district of Anqing, Anhui, Sichuan
- Yingjiang County, a county in Dehong Dai and Jingpo Autonomous Prefecture, Yunnan, China
