= Yun County =

Yun County could refer to the following locations in China:

- Yun County, Hubei (郧县)
- Yun County, Yunnan (云县)
