= Baiyi Zhuan =

The Baiyi Zhuan (simplified Chinese: 百夷传; traditional Chinese: 百夷傳; pinyin: Bǎiyí Zhuàn; lit. 'Account of One Hundred Barbarians') is a description of the Dai polity of Mong Mao in 1396 written by two envoys, Qian Guxun and Li Sicong, sent by the Ming court in China to resolve conflicts between the Ava Kingdom in Burma and Mong Mao, also known as Luchuan-Pingmian. The description includes the history, geography, political and social organization, customs, music, food, and products of the region (Sun Laichen, 1997). Ming Shilu describes the work:

The Messengers Li Si-cong and Qian Gu-xun were sent as envoys to the country of Burma and to the Bai-yi [Tai]...When Si-cong and the others returned, they memorialized the events. They also wrote Account of the Bai-yi, which recorded in detail the area's mountains and rivers, the people, the customs and the roads, and presented it. The Emperor was impressed that they had not neglected the duties of envoys and said that their talents were useful. He was very pleased and conferred upon each of them a set of clothing.

— Ming Shi-lu 11 Mar 1396
