= Lianghe County =

Lianghe County 梁河县
- County

Other transcription(s)
  - Pinyin: Liánghé Xiàn
  - Tai Nuea: ᥔᥦᥢᥱ ᥛᥫᥒᥰ ᥖᥤᥰ
  - Jingpho: Lengho Ginwang
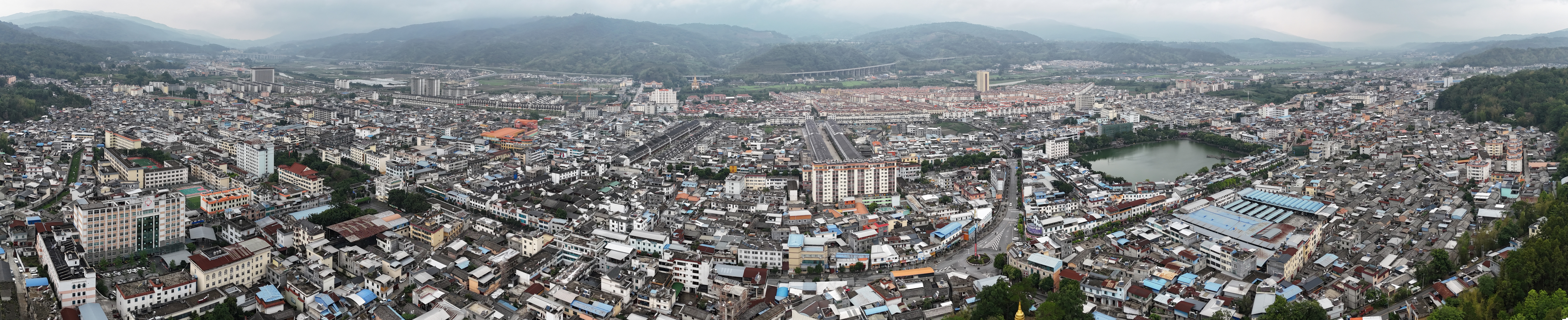
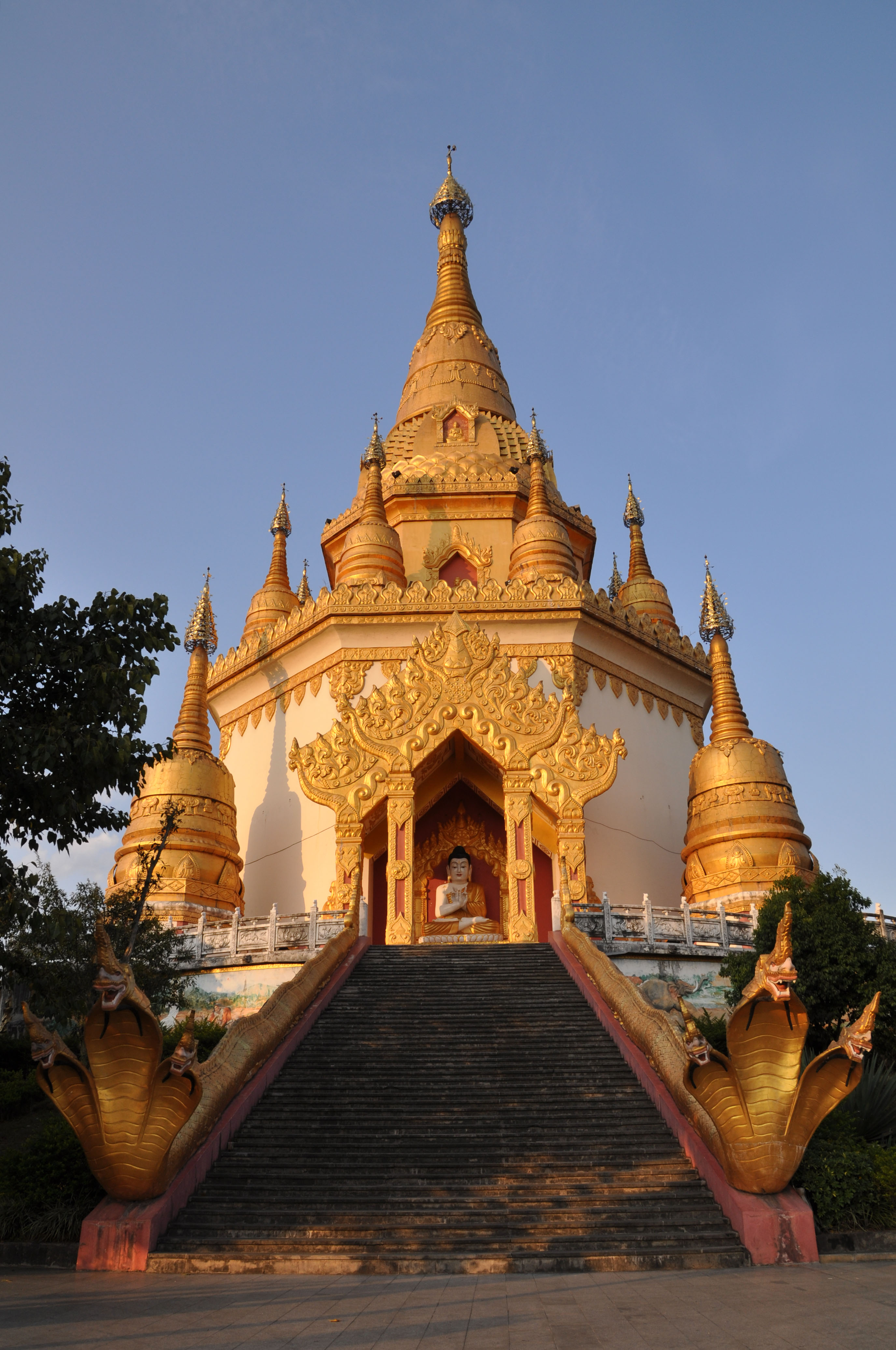
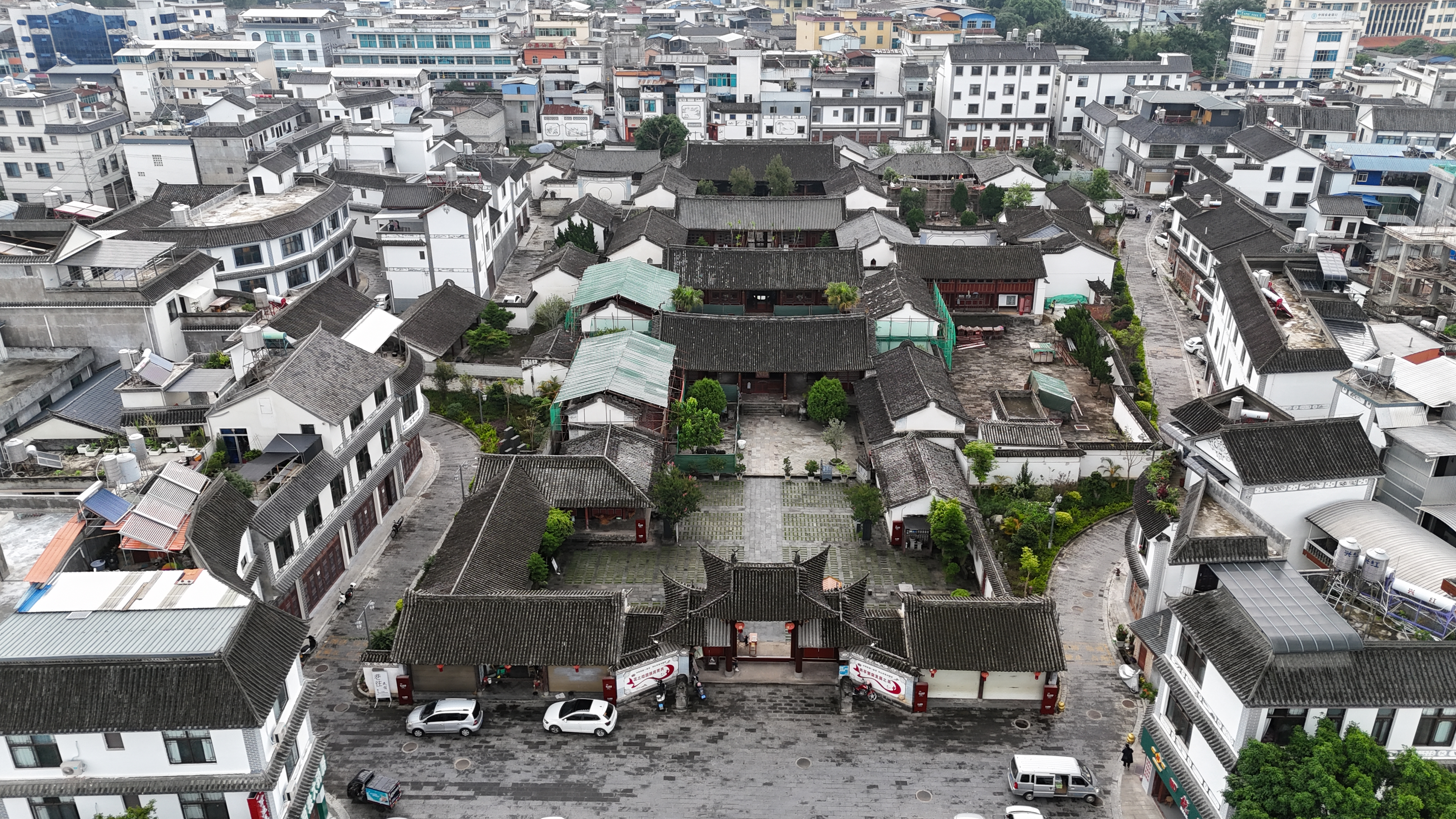
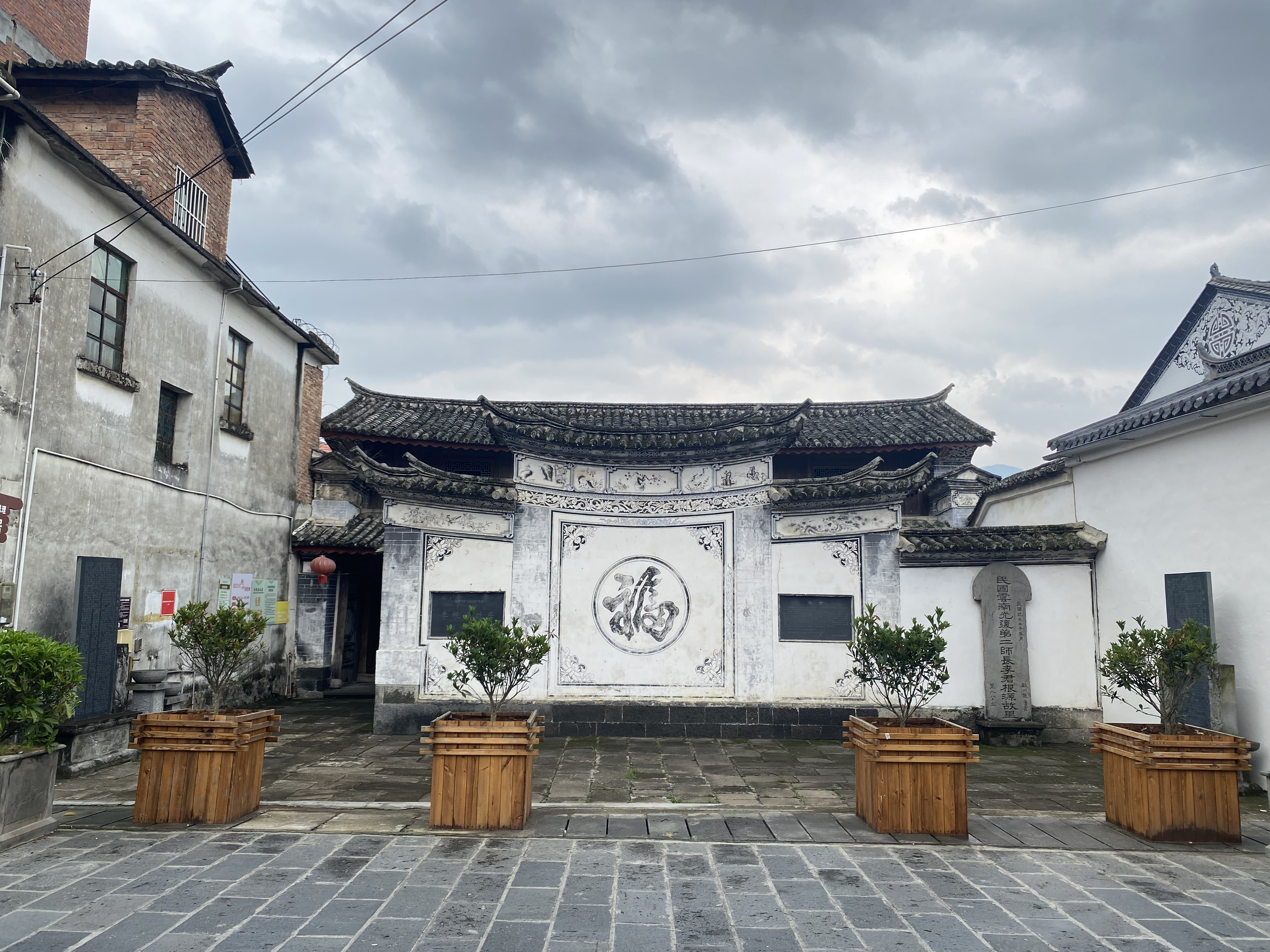
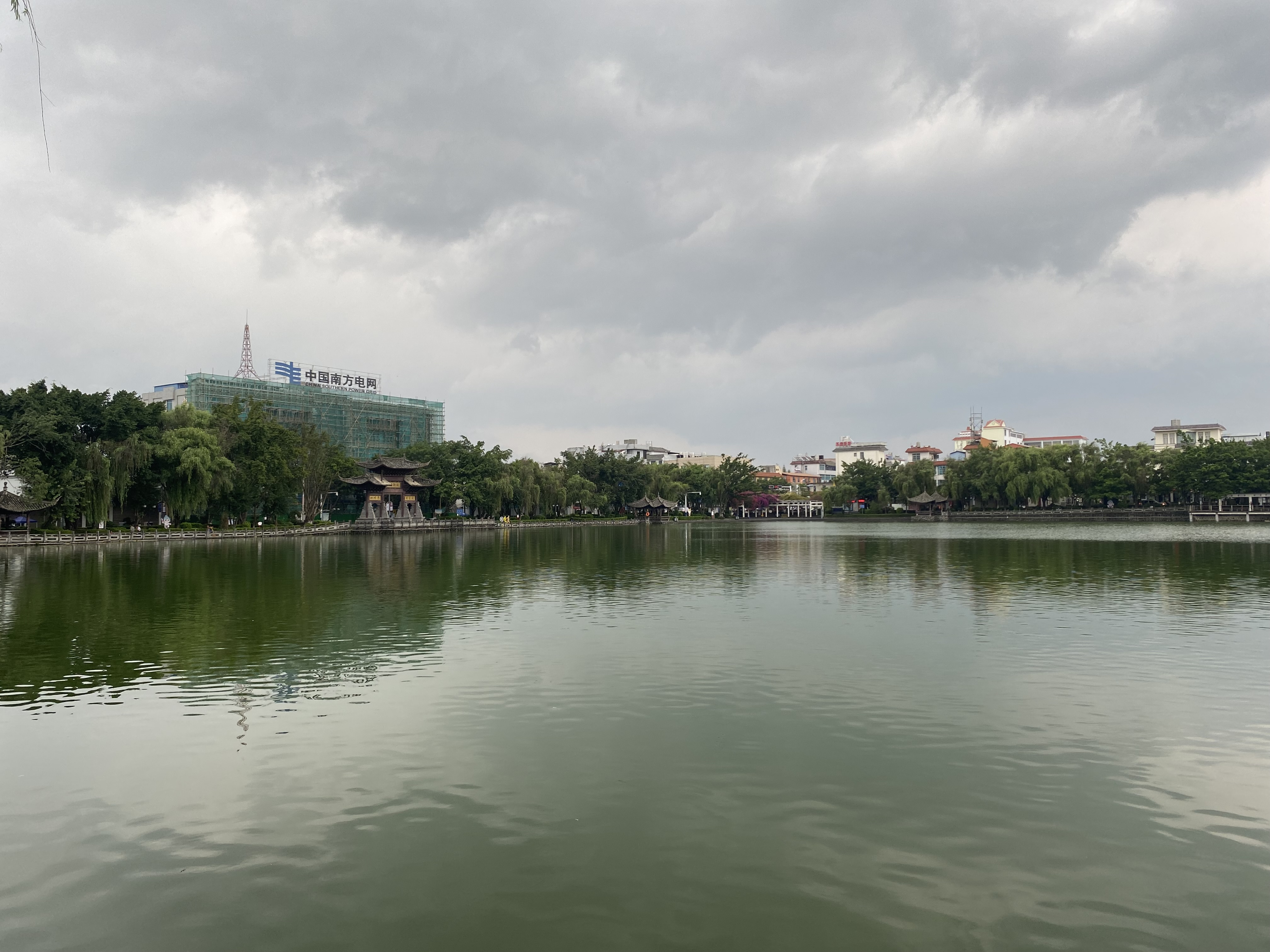
- Cityscape of county town Mengdi Great Stupa Nandian Tusi Chiefdom Office Former residence of Li Genyuan Longtan Park

- Location of Lianghe County in Dehong Prefecture within Yunnan

- Location of the seat in Yunnan
- Coordinates: 24°45′02″N 98°18′11″E
- Country: China
- Province: Yunnan
- Autonomous prefecture: Dehong
- County seat: Zhedao

Area
  - Total: 1,159 km^{2} (447 sq mi)

Population (2020 census)
  - Total: 134,268
  - Density: 115.8/km^{2} (300.0/sq mi)
- Time zone: UTC+8 (CST)
- Postal code: 679200
- Area code: 0692
- Website: www.dhlh.gov.cn

Lianghe County (Chinese: 梁河县; pinyin: Liánghé Xiàn; Tai Nüa: ᥔᥦᥢᥱ ᥛᥫᥒᥰ ᥖᥤᥰ; Jingpho: Lengho Ginwang; Thai: เมืองตี) is located in Dehong Prefecture, Yunnan province, southwest China.

== Administrative divisions ==
Lianghe County has 3 towns, 4 townships and 2 ethnic townships.

3 towns

- Zhedao (遮岛镇)
- Mangdong (芒东镇)
- Mengyang (勐养镇)

4 townships

- Pingshan (平山乡)
- Xiaochang (小厂乡)
- Dachang (大厂乡)
- Hexi (河西乡)

2 ethnic townships

- Jiubao Achang Ethnic Township (九保阿昌族乡)
- Nangsong Achang Ethnic Township (曩宋阿昌族乡)

== History ==
Lianghe County was home to one of the Koshanpye Chinese Shan States. It was annexed into China in the early 20th century.

== Climate ==
Climate data for Lianghe, elevation 1,013 m (3,323 ft), (1991–2020 normals, extremes 1981–present)
Month	Jan	Feb	Mar	Apr	May	Jun	Jul	Aug	Sep	Oct	Nov	Dec	Year
Record high °C (°F)	24.6 (76.3)	29.3 (84.7)	31.3 (88.3)	33.8 (92.8)	34.1 (93.4)	33.1 (91.6)	35.5 (95.9)	34.8 (94.6)	35.1 (95.2)	33.9 (93.0)	29.7 (85.5)	25.8 (78.4)	35.5 (95.9)
Mean daily maximum °C (°F)	20.6 (69.1)	22.5 (72.5)	25.9 (78.6)	27.9 (82.2)	27.9 (82.2)	27.4 (81.3)	26.7 (80.1)	27.7 (81.9)	28.0 (82.4)	26.9 (80.4)	24.2 (75.6)	21.5 (70.7)	25.6 (78.1)
Daily mean °C (°F)	11.3 (52.3)	13.3 (55.9)	16.6 (61.9)	19.7 (67.5)	21.8 (71.2)	23.2 (73.8)	23.1 (73.6)	23.3 (73.9)	22.6 (72.7)	20.3 (68.5)	15.8 (60.4)	12.3 (54.1)	18.6 (65.5)
Mean daily minimum °C (°F)	4.1 (39.4)	5.9 (42.6)	9.2 (48.6)	13.3 (55.9)	17.4 (63.3)	20.6 (69.1)	21.0 (69.8)	20.9 (69.6)	19.7 (67.5)	16.3 (61.3)	10.2 (50.4)	5.9 (42.6)	13.7 (56.7)
Record low °C (°F)	−1.4 (29.5)	0.4 (32.7)	2.2 (36.0)	6.3 (43.3)	11.6 (52.9)	16.1 (61.0)	15.7 (60.3)	15.4 (59.7)	12.3 (54.1)	7.6 (45.7)	2.9 (37.2)	−0.4 (31.3)	−1.4 (29.5)
Average precipitation mm (inches)	21.9 (0.86)	21.8 (0.86)	28.8 (1.13)	65.8 (2.59)	164.1 (6.46)	236.5 (9.31)	261.2 (10.28)	237.7 (9.36)	160.6 (6.32)	128.3 (5.05)	29.9 (1.18)	9.5 (0.37)	1,366.1 (53.77)
Average precipitation days (≥ 0.1 mm)	3.4	4.6	6.6	10.9	16.2	21.0	25.5	22.8	17.3	12.5	4.9	2.6	148.3
Average relative humidity (%)	75	70	67	70	77	84	87	86	85	82	79	78	78
Mean monthly sunshine hours	249.3	228.8	240.1	219.5	189.5	123.2	101.1	135.3	157.7	190.4	230.1	240.9	2,305.9
Percentage possible sunshine	74	71	64	57	46	30	24	34	43	54	71	74	54
Source: China Meteorological Administration
