= Xuangang Township =

- Township

Chinese transcription(s)
  - Simplified: 轩岗乡
  - Traditional: 軒崗鄉
  - Pinyin: Xuāngǎng Xiāng
- Location of the township region in Mangshi

- Location in Yunnan
- Coordinates: 24.449409°N 98.442866°E
- Country: China
- Province: Yunnan
- Prefecture: Dehong Dai and Jingpo Autonomous Prefecture
- County-level city: Mangshi

Area
  - Total: 163.7 km^{2} (63.2 sq mi)

Population (2017)
  - Total: 23,871
  - Density: 145.8/km^{2} (377.7/sq mi)
- Time zone: UTC+8 (China Standard)
- Postal code: 678402
- Area code: 0692

Xuangang Township (Chinese: 轩岗乡) is a township in Mangshi, Yunnan, China. As of the 2017 census it had a population of 23,871 and an area of 163.7 square kilometres (63.2 sq mi). The town is bordered to the north by Mangshi Town and Longshan Town, to the east by Fengping Town and Mangshi Town, to the south by Santaishan Township and Fengping Town, and to the west by Wuchalu Township and Jiangdong Township.

== Administrative divisions ==
As of December 2015, the township is divided into five villages and one community:

- Zhexiang Overseas Chinese Community (遮相华侨社区)
- Mangguang (芒广村)
- Bingmao (丙茂村)
- Mangbang (芒棒村)
- Yunzhuyuan (筠竹园村)
- Qincaitang (芹菜塘村)

== History ==
After the establishment of the Communist State in 1953, Xuangang District was set up.

It was renamed "Tuanjie Commune" (团结公社) in 1958 and "Xuangang Commune" in 1971.

In 1988 it was upgraded to a township.

== Geography ==
The township is high in the northwest and low in the southeast, with the highest altitude of 2,224 metres (7,297 ft) and the lowest altitude of 810 metres (2,660 ft).

The Mangshi River (芒市大河) flows through the town.

It belongs to the monsoon climate in the south subtropical mountainous region, with annual rainfall of 1,650 millimetres (65 in), annual average temperature of 19.6 °C (67.3 °F), abundant sunshine and distinct dry and wet seasons.

== Economy ==
The township is rich in silica and iron ore.

== Education ==
- Xuangang Township Central Primary School

== Transport ==
The Provincial Highway S318 passes across the township.
