= DJ Spinna =

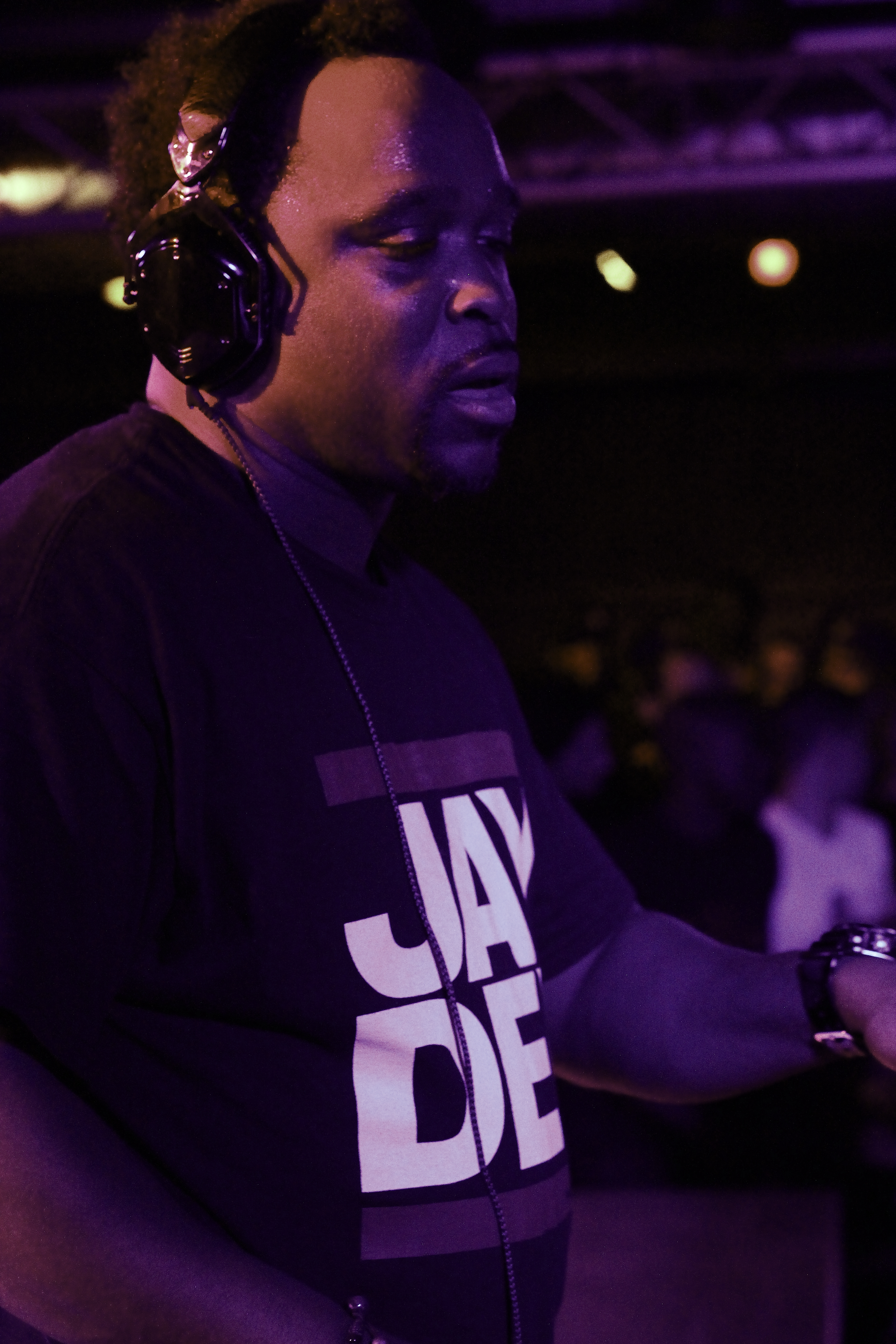
- DJ Spinna in 2014

Background information
- Born: Vincent Williams
- Origin: Brooklyn, New York
- Genres: Electro-funk; hip hop; soul; house
- Occupations: Producer; DJ
- Years active: 1994-present
- Labels: BBE; Rawkus Records; Wonderwax; High Water Music; Redefinition; Correct Technique
- Website: djspinna.com

Vincent E. Williams (born January 30, 1971) better known by his stage name DJ Spinna, is an American hip hop and deep house producer from Brooklyn. According to AllMusic, he has "remained strictly an underground artist despite his astonishing talent."

== Life and career ==
Spinna, who is of Panamanian background, began experimenting with turntables at age 11 and is known for combining dance music with hip hop, funk, and soul. He remixed artists such as De La Soul, Mary J. Blige, and Stevie Wonder. He also collaborated with Eminem on songs such as "Three Six Five," "Watch Deez", and "5-Star Generals", before the latter went on to superstardom. His first group, the Jigmastas, was with the emcee Kriminul. He is also a member of Polyrhythm Addicts, an underground hip-hop 'supergroup' composed of him, Apani B. Fly, Mr. Complex, and Shabaam Sahdeeq. The group's album Rhyme-Related was released in 1999 on Wreck/Nervous Records and featured a song with Pharoahe Monch. Apani B Fly MC was replaced by Tiye Phoenix when the group reunited and recorded the 2007 release Break Glass, which featured the single "Reachin'", released on April 24, 2007. He also worked with New York-based live house-music group Tortured Soul as well as being a member of the group Domecrackers with DJ-Producer Joc Max from Kansas City, and Grap Luva, whose brother is legendary hip hop producer Pete Rock.

== Discography ==
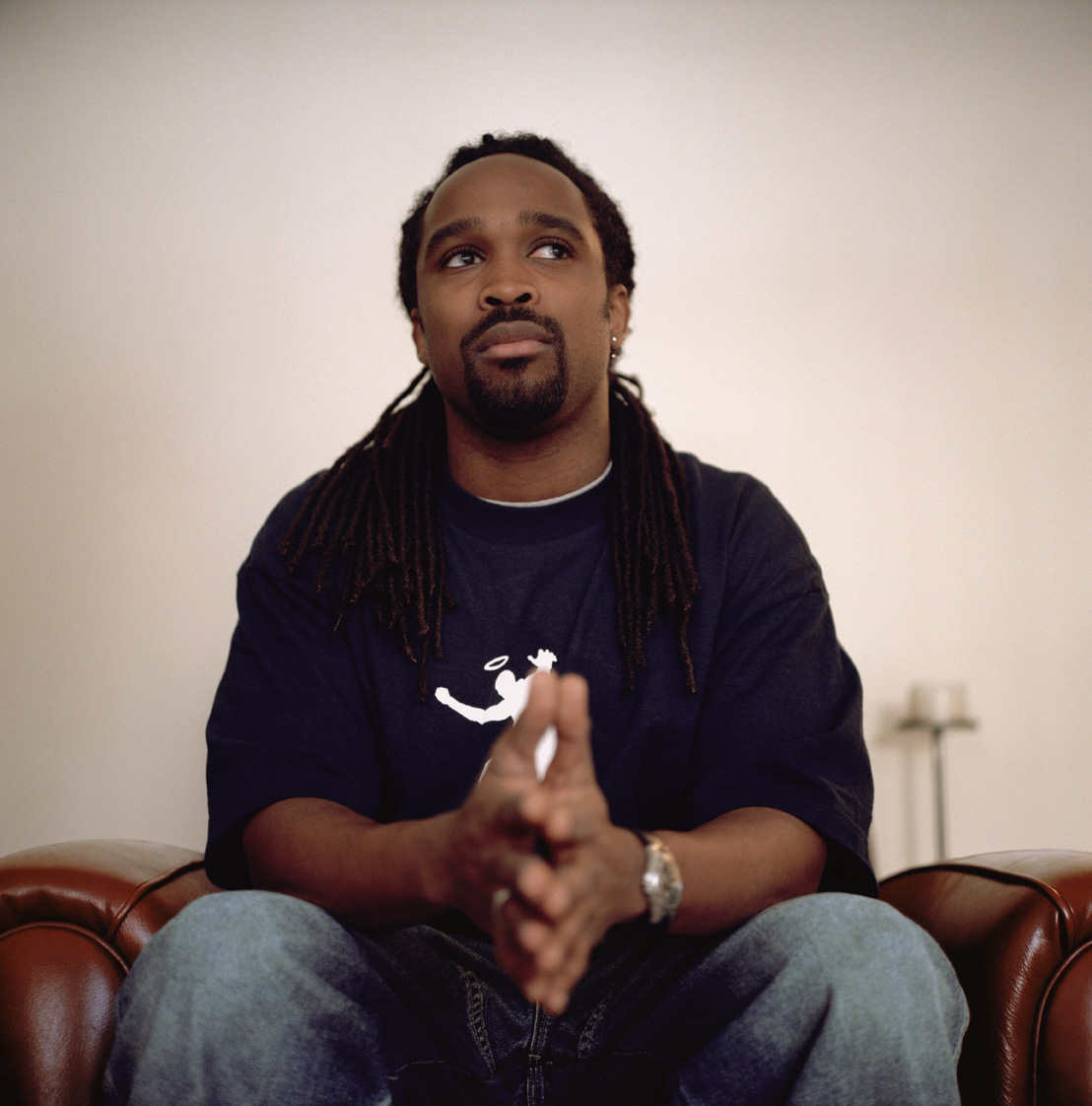
DJ Spinna in 2003.

=== Studio albums ===
- Heavy Beats Volume 1 (1999)
- Here to There (2003)
- Intergalactic Soul (2006)
- Sonic Smash (2009)
- Compositions4 (2015)
- 1996 Beat Tape, Vol 1 (2017)
- Unpicked Treats Volume One (2018)
- Unpicked Treats Volume Two (2018)
- 1997 Beat Tape (2019)

=== Compilation albums ===
- Beyond Real Experience Volume 1 (1998)
- Beat Suite (2000)
- Strange Games and Things (2001)
- Mix the Vibe: Eclectic Mindset (2002)
- Beyond Real Experience Volume 2 (2002)
- Raiding the Crates (2002)
- Fueled for the Future (2003)
- The Wonder of Stevie: Melody Man (2004) (with Bobbito)
- The West End New York City Classics Mix (2008)
- The Boogie Back: Post Disco Club Jams (2009)
- Strange Games & Funky Things Volume 5 (2010)
- Underground Forever (2010)
- The Beat Generation 10th Anniversary Collection (2011) (with Mr. Thing)

=== EPs ===
- Jiggy Breaks (1996)
- Compositions (1996)
- Compositions 2 (2004)
- Compositions 3 (2005)
- Compositions 4 (2015)

=== Singles ===
- "Rock" b/w "Watch Dees" (2000)
- "DJ Song" (2000)
- "Deep-Rooted" (2001)
- "Fall in Love" (2002) (with Tortured Soul)
- "Drive" b/w "Rock (Unplugged)" (2002)
- "Music in Me" (2003)
- "Rock (The Grand Finale)" (2003)
- "Reality" (2003) (with Rich Medina)
- "Outta Time" (2004)
- "We Can Change This World" (2006)
- "Back 2 U" (2006)
- "Living My Life" (2007)
- "You Should Be Loving Me" (2007) (with Ovasoul7)
- "Dillagence" b/w "The Spirit of '94" (2008)
- "Motion Picture" (2013) (with Shabaam Sahdeeq)
- "Chalk on Asphalt" (2014)

=== Productions ===
- 7L & Esoteric - "The Soul Purpose” from The Soul Purpose (2000)
- J-Live - "R.A.G.E." and "True School Anthem" from The Best Part (2001)
- Thirstin Howl III - "Watch Deez" from Skilligan's Island (2002)
- Sadat X - "Still on Deck" from Wild Cowboys II (2010)
- Homeboy Sandman - "Being Haved" from The Good Sun (2010)
- Homeboy Sandman - "1,2,3" from Hallways (2014)
- Aesop Rock & Homeboy Sandman - "Vertigo" from Lice (2015)
