= Ray Avery (photographer) =

American photographer (1920–2002)

Murray "Ray" Bertrand Avery (28 September 1920 – 17 November 2002) was a jazz photographer and jazz record collector. He began collecting jazz recordings as a student at Big Bear Lake High School in Big Bear Lake, California. He continued to collect records while attending UCLA and during his enlistment in the Air Force during World War II where he piloted supply planes over “The Hump”. After the war, he married Kathryn “Kay” Karr. They had two children, Alison and Jeffery. Together, Ray and Kay opened Ray Avery's Rare Records in Glendale, California.

After his death, part of his collection, approximately 63,300 78 rpm, 10-inch sound discs, were donated to the Los Angeles Jazz Society who then collaborated to archive the collection at the University of California Long Beach.

Ray was also known for his jazz photography business, Ray Avery Jazz Archives. His photographs adorn more than one hundred and fifty album covers, and have appeared on over one hundred and twenty-five CDs. His most famous photos of well known jazz artists continue to be used in Hollywood movies. His subjects included Art Blakey, Wardell Gray, Thelonious Monk, Chico Hamilton, Billie Holiday, Lord Buckley and Sonny Rollins.
