= Selan =

Selan Seilant
- Village
- Location in Myanmar (Burma)
- Coordinates: 23°56′00″N 97°50′00″E
- Country: Myanmar
- State: Shan State
- District: Mu Se District
- Township: Namhkam Township
- Time zone: UTC+6.30 (MMT)

Selan or Seilant is a village in northern Shan State, Myanmar (Burma). It was one of the capitals of the ancient state of Möng Mao.
