= Hmong: History of a People =

Book by H.Keith Quincy

- Author: H. Keith Quincy
- Language: English
- Subject: Hmong people
- Publication place: United States
- Media type: Print

Hmong: History of a People is a book by H. Keith Quincy, PhD, published by the Eastern Washington University Press. It was initially published in 1988 with a revised edition published in 1995.

It chronicles the history of the Hmong people in China; it also documents the modern Hmong with main focus on Hmong in Laos and also some focus on Hmong in Vietnam. In 2005 Robert Entenmann, Ph.D. of St. Olaf College wrote that the book was "the only easily available English-language study of Hmong history." The sources used in the work include historical events and eyewitness interviews. The author, who was an Eastern Washington University (EWU) professor in the Department of Government, received his doctoral degree from Claremont Colleges and specialized in American politics, political theory, and Vietnam. Quincy described himself as a "political philosopher".

== Content ==
There are eleven chapters in the book. The history of the Hmong people is discussed in Chapters 1 through 3. The traditional culture of the Hmong, the 19th Century migration of Hmong into Southeast Asia, and the opium-producing role of the Hmong and that effect on global politics and international trade are all chronicled in Chapters 4 through 6. Chapters 7 through 10 discuss the involvement of Hmong in Laos with the French colonial governments, the Laotian government, and the U.S. military.; this included intra-Hmong feuds. Chapter 11 discusses the Communist victory in Laos in 1975.

There are not very many direct attributions to material, and the book does not have footnotes, nor does it have any other formal references to sources. Entenmann stated that the absence of footnotes was "a remarkable omission for a monograph published by a university press". Bruce Downing, who wrote a review for the Journal of Refugee Studies, stated "This is not a highly scholarly work".

This book cites François Marie Savina's Histoire des Miao, and The History of the Hmong (Meo) by Jean Mottin in its bibliography.

=== Historical statements ===
==== Sonom ====
Entenmann states that even though the book identifies Sonom as a Hmong king, Sonom in fact was not Hmong. Entenmann argued that the use of the word "Miao" was imprecise during the time when Jean Joseph Marie Amiot wrote an account of the Jinchuan Wars, since the Qing government under the Qianlong Emperor referred to all ethnic minorities as "Miao people" (Chinese: 苗民; pinyin: Miáomín; Wade–Giles: Miao-min). Amiot uses "Miao-tsée" (苗子; Miáozi; Miao-tzu) to refer to the Gyalrong people, of which Sonom was a part. This is distinct from the word "Miaozu" (苗族; Miáozú; Miao-tsu).

Savina reprinted the account by Amiot. Entenmann stated that Savina made the error confusing the Gyalrong for the Hmong because he "was unfamiliar with Chinese history and the subtleties of Chinese vocabulary" even though he had studied Chinese. The word "Miao" in general was also used to refer to Hmong people. Entenmann stated that the book Hmong: History of a People "does not offer a reliable history of the Hmong in China" because Quincy was "evidently not trained as a historian" and did not read Chinese, so he introduced the error made by Savina. Mottin also included the Savina account.

==== Siberian theory ====
Mark E. Pfeifer, PhD of the Hmong Cultural and Resource Center (HCRC) of Saint Paul, Minnesota stated that the book "strongly suggested" that in a period between 3000 B.C. and 2500 B.C. the Hmong people had migrated to China from Siberia, but that there was no "firm evidence" behind the theory. Quincy cited some missionary beliefs stating that blue eyes and blonde hair proved the Siberian origins. Nicholas Tapp, author of "The State of Hmong Studies," stated that the missionary beliefs were myths and they had been discredited a long time prior to 2005. Tapp stated that there were other possible reasons for the blonde hair and blue eyes, such as relations with Westerners and albinism. Downing stated that the Siberian/Caucasian origin theory was an "ill-supported notion" and that Chapters 1-3 give "perhaps too much attention" to the theory.

=== Other statements ===
Tapp also stated that the book presented the existence and details of a year 400-900 Hmong Kingdom with no evidence, arguing that the Chinese never kept such records of the Hmong.

Downing stated "One suspects that myths, legends and self-serving accounts of events have sometimes been given undue credence."

== Reception ==
In 2005 Pfeifer, referring to statements by Tapp and Entenmann, stated "In recent years, Quincy’s Hmong History of People has been strongly critiqued by key scholars of Hmong and Asian Studies". Tapp described Hmong: History of a People as "extraordinarily inaccurate and utterly misleading", a "wretched paperback", and a "sorry publication". Entenmann concluded that Tapp's assessments were "fully justified."

In his 1989 review Downing concluded that "Quincy is to be congratulated for making a comprehensive, ideologically neutral, and readable overview of Hmong history available in English of the first time." Downing stated that Quincy "has created a narrative that makes easy and interesting reading". Downing argued that the book should have explained the name "Miao" as it was used in China, since there are many different ethnic groups that speak the Miao languages, which Downing compares to the situations of the German people, Anglo-Saxons, and Vikings as being a part of a larger group. Downing added that there were "minor errors of fact and typography".

== Legacy ==
Pfeifer stated that many academics and students who read Hmong: History of a People circulated Quincy's theory on the Hmong coming from Siberia. Anne Fadiman used this book as a source for the sections on Hmong history in her book, The Spirit Catches You and You Fall Down. She stated "Were I citing the source of each detail, Quincy's name would attach itself to nearly every sentence in the pages on the Hmong in China." Fadiman's book cited the Quincy Siberian theory. Entenmann wrote that because of the reliance on Quincy's book, Fadiman's book propagated the mistaken idea that Sonom was a Hmong king.
