= Sonom =

lord-lama of Chuchen (Greater Jinchuan)
- Reign: c. 1766 – 1776
- Predecessor: Langkya
- Successor: annexed by Qing China
- Born: Unknown; Chuchen
- Died: c. June 13–14, 1776 (executed); Beijing, Qing China
- Father: Langkya
- Mother: Atsang

- Sonom

Tibetan name
- Tibetan: བསོད་ནམས
Transcriptions
- Wylie: bSod-nams

Chinese name
- Traditional Chinese: 索諾木
- Simplified Chinese: 索诺木
Transcriptions
Standard Mandarin
- Hanyu Pinyin: Suǒnuòmù

Sonom (died c. June 13–14, 1776) was a chieftain of the Gyalrong people in China. He was the lord-lama of Greater Jinchuan. He was executed after his January 1776 defeat in the Jinchuan campaigns.

== Family ==
Sonom was the fourth son of Langkya (Note: Langkya: Chinese: 郎卡; pinyin: Lángkǎ; Wade–Giles: Lang-k'a), who was the previous ruler of Greater Jinchuan. Sonom's mother was Atsang (Note: Atsang: 阿倉; Ācāng; A-ts'ang), and his eldest brother was Slob dpon rgyal bdak (Note: Slob dpon rgyal bdak or Shaloben Gangdak: 莎羅奔岡達克; 莎罗奔冈达克; Shāluóbēn Gāngdákè; Sha-lo-pen Kang-ta-k'o).

According to the Jinchuan suoji ("Petty Notes on Jinchuan") (Note: Jinchuan suoji: 金川瑣記; 金川琐记; Jīnchuān Suǒjì; Chin-ch'uan So-chi - It is within Congshu jicheng (叢書集成; 丛书集成; Cóngshū Jíchéng; Ts'ung-shu Chi-ch'eng) Volume 3199) 3 by Li Xinheng (Note: Li Xinheng: 李心衡; Lǐ Xīnhéng; Li Hsin-heng), a paternal aunt of Sonom was the wife of Skal bzang (Note: Skal bzang or Senggesang: 僧格桑; Sēnggésāng; Seng-ko-sang). Langkya's daughter married Skal bzang. Therefore, Langkya is also Sonom's great-uncle.

Sonom's grandfather was Leržirhi (Note: Leržirhi 勒爾日爾習; 勒尔日尔习; Lèěrrìěrxí; Le-erh-jih-erh-hsi). One of Sonom's aunts was Atsing (Note: Atsing: 阿青; Āqīng; A-ch'ing). He had a nephew, Dundju Wangdjar (Note: Dundju Wangdjar 敦珠汪札爾; 敦珠汪札尔; Dūnzhū Wāngzháěr; Tun-chu Wang-cha-erh).

== Career ==
Sonom, along with Langyka, supported Skal bzang's military campaigns. They argued in favor of their actions in reports they sent to the Chinese government. At 19 sui Sonom became the leader of Greater Jichuan after Langkya's death. At the beginning of his rule, Atsang and Atsing assisted him. Ulrich Theobald, author of "The Second Jinchuan Campaign (1771 – 1776) Economic, Social and Political Aspects of an Important Qing Period Border War", wrote that Sonom "hesitated a long time before promising his support to Lesser Jinchuan during the second Jinchuan war."

=== Death ===
In January 1776 his forces were defeated in the Jinchuan wars of the Ten Great Campaigns. He and his family were presented to the Emperor of China.

Circa June 13–14, 1776, Sonom and other rebel leaders were executed by lingchi. His skull was made into a kapala, his tibia was made into a kangling, both were preserved and kept in a royal Buddhist temple in Beijing. Of his family, some of the women were enslaved and given to lords of the Ölöd Mongol and Solun. Other women and the children were sentenced to life imprisonment (永遠監禁; 永远监禁; Yǒngyuǎn jiānjìn; Yung-yüan Chien-chin).

== Misidentification as a Hmong king ==
The 1988 book Hmong: History of a People by H. Keith Quincy stated that Sonom was a Hmong king. The book by Quincy, cited by others, stated that in 1772 Sonom had defeated a Chinese army and that Sonom had held the Chinese government forces at bay for four years. According to the Quincy account, ultimately Sonom surrendered when the Chinese promised that his family would survive if he did so. Instead he and his family were executed. Paul Hillmer, the author of the A People’s History of the Hmong, wrote that "This compelling story helps set a dramatic tone for discussing the Hmong's life of hardship in China".

Robert Entenmann, author of "The Myth of Sonom, the Hmong King," stated that Sonom in fact was not Hmong. Entenmann argued that the use of the word "Miao" was imprecise during the time when Jean Joseph Marie Amiot wrote an account of the Jinchuan Wars, since the Qing government under the Qianlong Emperor referred to all ethnic minorities in Southwest China as "Miao people" (苗民; Miáomín; Miao-min). Amiot uses "Miao-tsée" (苗子; Miáozi; Miao-tzu) to refer to the Gyalrong people, of which Sonom was a part. This is distinct from the word "Miaozu" (苗族; Miáozú; Miao-tsu).

François Marie Savina, in Histoire des Miao, reprinted the account by Amiot. Entenmann stated that Savina made the error confusing the Gyalrong for the Hmong because he "was unfamiliar with Chinese history and the subtleties of Chinese vocabulary" even though he had studied Chinese. The word "Miao" in general was also used to refer to Hmong people. Entenmann stated that the book Hmong: History of a People "does not offer a reliable history of the Hmong in China" because Quincy was "evidently not trained as a historian" and did not read Chinese, so he introduced the error made by Savina. Jean Mottin also included the Savina account in The History of the Hmong (Meo).

Anne Fadiman in her book The Spirit Catches You and You Fall Down cited Quincy and stated that Sonom was Hmong. Entenmann wrote that because of the reliance on Quincy's book, Fadiman's book propagated the mistaken idea that Sonom was a Hmong king.

Hillmer wrote that Entenmann's article "has largely proved[...]that Sonom was not Hmong".
