= Chiefdom of Tsanlha =

Tibetan Tusi chiefdom (1650–1776)

Chiefdom of Tsanlha བཙན་ལྷ་
- 1650–1776
- Status: Chiefdom under the Chinese Tusi system
- Capital: Tsanlha (in present day Xiaojin County)
- Common languages: Gyarung
- Government: Monarchy
- Tsanlha Gyalpo
  - 17??–17??: Tse dbang
  - 17??–1776: Skal bzang (last)
- History
  - Established: 1650
  - Disestablished: 1776
Succeeded by
Qing dynasty
- Today part of: China

Chiefdom of Tsanlha (Tibetan: བཙན་ལྷ་, Wylie: btsan lha; Chinese: 贊拉土司; pinyin: Zànlā Tǔsī), also known as Chiefdom of Lesser Jinchuan (Chinese: 小金川土司; pinyin: Xiǎo Jīnchuān Tǔsī; Tibetan: གསོའུ་ཀྱིན་ཆྭན་གཡེན་ཧྭ་ཐོའུ་སི), was an autonomous Gyalrong chiefdom that ruled Lesser Jinchuan (present day Xiaojin County, Sichuan) during Qing dynasty. The rulers of Tsanlha used the royal title Tsanlha Gyalpo (Tibetan: བཙན་ལྷ་རྒྱལ་པོ, Wylie: btsan lha rgyal po).

The chieftains of Tsanla were descendants of a Bon lama. He established the chiefdom in the end of the Ming dynasty. By the time of the Ming-Qing transition, he swore allegiance to Qing emperor, and was appointed Native Chieftain (Tusi).

Later, Tsanla came into conflict with Chiefdom of Chuchen (Greater Jinchuan). After Jinchuan campaigns, it was annexed by the Qing dynasty.
