= Meow (disambiguation) =

Meow is an imitative word for a sound made in cat communication.

Meow or Miaow may also refer to:

== Film and television ==
- Meow (2017 film), a 2017 Hong Kong science fantasy comedy film
- Meow (2021 film), a 2021 Indian Malayalam-language family drama film
- Meow (Dark Angel), an episode in the TV series Dark Angel
- Meow, a cat-like alien character in the anime Space Dandy
- Meeow!, a 2000-2003 British animated series, called Meusaidh in Gaelic

== Music ==
- Miaow (band), an English band
- Miaow (album), a 1994 album by The Beautiful South
- Mew (band), a band from Denmark
- Meovv, a South Korean girl group
- "Meow", a song from the Anamanaguchi album Endless Fantasy
- "Me-ow", a 1918 ragtime song by Mel B. Kaufman
- "Meow Meow" (song), a song from the Tamil film Kanthaswamy
- "Meow", a song from the South Korean girl group STAYC

== Other uses ==
- Meow 104.8 FM, an FM Radio Channel in India
- Meow (cat), once the world's heaviest cat
- Miaow, or miaow miaow, a supposed slang name for the stimulant drug mephedrone
- Meow (Pillow Pal), a cat Pillow Pal plush toy made by Ty
- MEOW, a sarcastic initialism for the phrase Moral Equivalent of War
- .meow, a proposed generic top-level domain

== See also ==
- Colonel Meow, an individual cat with this name noted for its fur length
- Meow Wars, a series of flame wars on Usenet in the 1990s
- Meow Meow (disambiguation)
- Meowy (disambiguation)
- Miao (disambiguation)
- Miou-Miou, French actress
- Cat's meow (disambiguation)
