= Jinchuan campaigns =

Two wars in Jinchuan, now Sichuan, China

- Part of Ten Great Campaigns
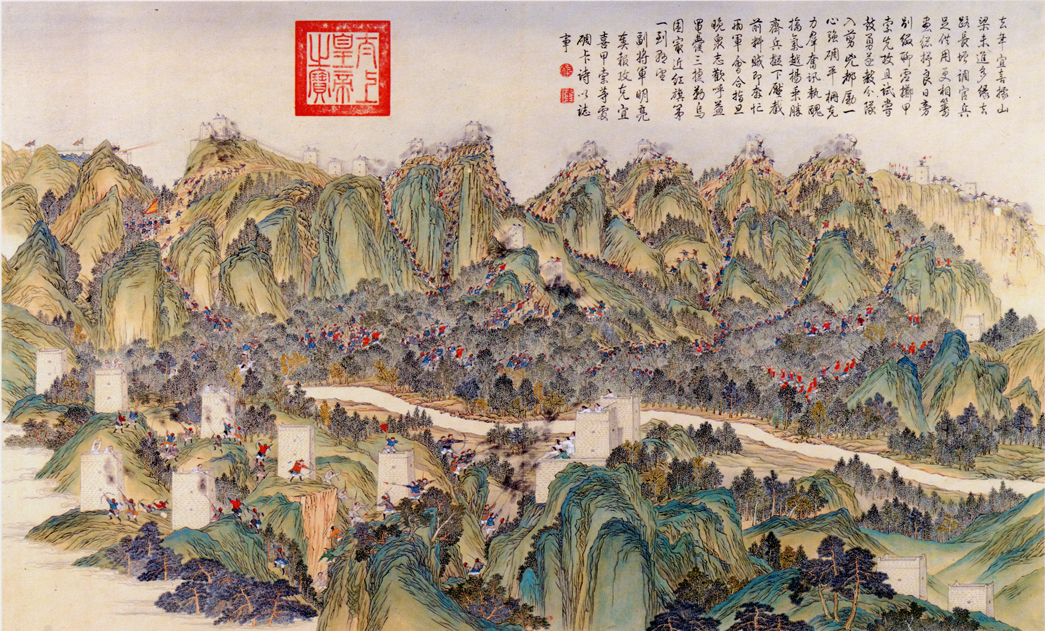
- Court painting of the Campaign Against Jinchuan
Date	First Campaign: 1747–1749 (3 years) Second Campaign: 1771–1776 (6 years)
Location	Chuchen (Greater Jinchuan) and Tsanlha (Lesser Jinchuan) (now Jinchuan and Xiaojin counties, Sichuan, China) 31.476°N 102.067°E
Result	Qing Victory: Tusi system was abolished

Belligerents
Qing Empire; Gyalrong chiefdoms: Tsanlha (1st campaign); Chakla; Geshitsa; Ogshi; Tsenpa; Bawam; Trokyap; Somang; Dzonggag; Jotse; Lungu; Muchi	Chuchen; Tsanlha (2nd campaign)

Commanders and leaders
Qianlong Emperor; First Campaign: Zhang Guangsi (executed); Necin (executed); Fuheng; Yue Zhongqi; Second Campaign: Guilin; Artai; Wenfu †; Šucang; Agui; Fuk'anggan; Ha Guoxing; Hailanca	First Campaign: Slob Dpon (surrendered); Second Campaign: Sonom (executed); Skal bzang (executed)

Strength
600,000 infantry	30,000 militia

Casualties and losses
50,000 casualties	30,000 casualties
- Jinchuan's location on the map of China

The Jinchuan campaigns (Chinese: 大小金川之役), also known as the Suppression of the Jinchuan Hill Peoples (Chinese: 平定兩金川), were two wars between Qing Empire and the rebel forces of Gyalrong chieftains ("Tusi") from the Jinchuan region. The first campaign against Chiefdom of Chuchen (Da Jinchuan or Greater Jinchuan in Chinese) happened in 1747 when the Tusi of Greater Jinchuan Slob Dpon attacked the Chiefdom of Chakla (Mingzheng). The Qianlong Emperor decided to mobilize forces and suppress Slob Dpon, who surrendered to the central government in 1749. The second campaign against Chiefdom of Tsanlha (Xiao Jinchuan or Lesser Jinchuan) took place in 1771, when the Jinchuan Tusi Sonom killed Geshitsa Tusi of Ngawa County in Sichuan Province. After Sonom killed Geshitsa Tusi, he helped Tusi of Lesser Jinchuan, Skal bzang, to occupy the lands belonging to the other Tusi in the region. The provincial government ordered Sonom to return lands and accept the trial at the Ministry of Justice immediately. Sonom refused to retreat his rebels. The Qianlong Emperor was furious and gathered 80,000 troops and entered Jinchuan. In 1776, Qing troops sieged the castle of Sonom to force his surrender.

The Jinchuan campaigns were two of the Ten Great Campaigns of Qianlong. Compare to his other eight campaigns, the cost of fighting Jinchuan was extraordinary. Jinchuan, a small county of Sichuan, cost the Qing Empire 50,000 people and 70 million silver taels to conquer, a cost that was more devastating than any other Great Campaigns accomplished by Qianlong.

== Background ==
=== The History of Jinchuan ===
The name Jinchuan (Chinese: 金川; Tibetan: ཆུ་ཆེན་) means "Golden Stream" in Chinese and "Big River" in Tibetan. The name refers to two rivers in Northwest Sichuan, the Greater Jinchuan and the Lesser Jinchuan, both of which are tributaries of Dadu River. The literary meaning of the name in Chinese stems from ancient tales which described a giant gold mine between Greater Jinchuan and Lesser Jinchuan. The majority people who lived in Jinchuan were rGyalrong People, who were ruled under the name of Buddha by hereditary Tusi.

=== The History of Tusi ===
The Gyalrong (Chinese: 嘉绒人; Tibetan: རྒྱལ་རོང་; Wylie: rgyal rong) are a Qiangic people who live in the Northwest Sichuan, China. They speak rGyalrong languages and practice Tibetan Buddhism. The Ming dynasty set up the Tusi system in Sichuan and Tibet to stabilize cultural conflicts between Confucian central government and Buddhist tribes. Tusi was the prime leader of his designated tribe, of which there were eighteen in Sichuan. Tusi ruled the Gyalrong tribes for decades as a puppet ruler of the government.

By the end of the Ming dynasty, the Tusi system was unable to adapt to the rapid changes of society. Tusi promoted the slavery system in Jinchuan, and they had the rights of a chieftain in their tribes. There were minor armed conflicts between the eighteen Tusi. Some of those conflicts evolved into armed rebellions. Officials of Qing realized that the Tusi system was a problem after they took over China from Ming. The viceroy of Yun-Gui Ortai suggested Yongzheng emperor to start the Bureaucratization of Tusi in Sichuan to replace the Tusi system, then retake the land and people for the empire. In 1726, the emperor had Ortai supervise the bureaucratization. The reform was successful in Guizhou and Yunnan. But it saw resistance in Sichuan when the Tusi started a major rebellion.

== The Two Campaigns ==
=== First Campaign Against Jinchuan ===
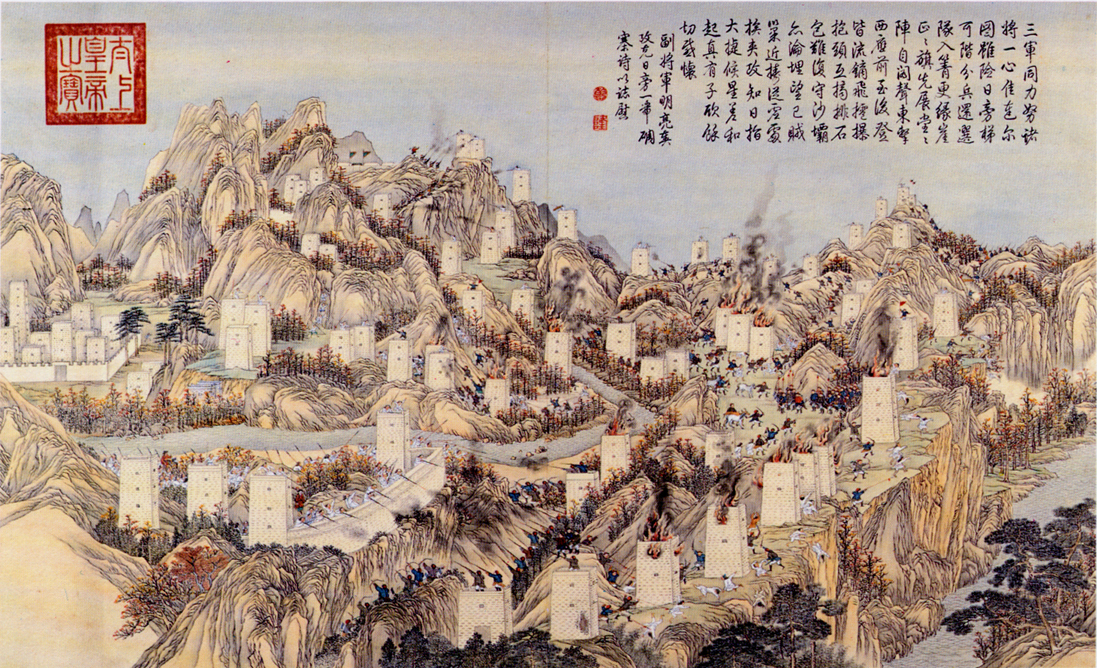
Attack on mountain Raipang. Most battles in Jinchuan took place in the mountains.

Slob Dpon (Chinese: 莎羅奔) was the Tusi of Greater Jinchuan. He was trying to unite tribes in Sichuan to fight the bureaucratization of Tusi. He kidnapped the Tusi of Lesser Jinchuan Tsewang (Chinese: 澤旺) in 1746 to force an alliance between Greater Jinchuan and minor Jinchuan. People in Lesser Jichuan were not satisfied with Slob Dpon. They sent a messenger to Chengdu to notify the Sichuan governor Ji Shan. Slob Dpon heard about this, one might as well be hanged for a sheep as a lamb. In 1747, Slob Dpon ordered an assault against the Kingdom of Chakla (Mingzheng Tusi). Ji Shan sent a few garrisons to attack Slob Dpon. The garrisons were defeated quickly and unexpectedly. Ji Shan realized the emergence of this sudden event and Slob Dpon's ambitions. He reported the rebellion and asked for help from the imperial court.

The Grand Council was angered by Slob Dpon's action. Qianlong mobilized 30,000 troops to suppress Slob Dpon's tribe. He appointed Zhang Guangsi as the overall commander to capture Greater Jinchuan. The corrupt Qing army failed to defeat Slob Dpon's untrained tribe warriors under highland climate. One year later, Qianlong ordered one of his Grand Secretariats Necin to reinforce Zhang's army with more than 40,000 soldiers. Slob Dpon fortified the mountains and waterways, and the rGyalrongs were more familiar with the landscape. Necin didn't cooperate well with Zhang due to court politics. Besides, Necin never had experience in commanding armed forces before. Slob Dpon placed a spy near in Qing's high command. Zhang did not find out about it. Greater Jinchuan was prepared for all its opponents military actions. Qing army was defeated again in April 1748. Qianlong executed Zhang in December under the charge of disadvantageous commanding Heaven's army. Necin committed suicide for shaming the emperor's name.

Fuheng became the commander in 1749. He was an experienced general. He slowed the attack and killed all the spies in the army. Fuheng separated the army to attack Slop Dpon from different directions. Qing army finally broke the walls of Slob Dpon's stronghold in 1749. Slob Dpon surrendered, and he agreed to pay as tribute thousands of silver taels and many golden Buddha statues to save his life. Qianlong emperor trusted him and kept him as the Tusi, and paused the bureaucratization in Sichuan province.

The First Campaign Against Jinchuan was considered one of Qianlong's Great Achievements. Ironically, it was extremely unsuccessful for the following reasons:

1. The Qing government mobilized more than 80,000 men in total from seven provinces to fight against a tribe that was not equipped with cannons nor firearms.
2. Qianlong did not execute Slob Dpon, which made other Tusi more fearful of Greater Jinchuan's force.
3. The central government did not take any step to limit Tusi's army size, which gave them opportunities to rebel again.

=== Second Campaign Against Jinchuan ===
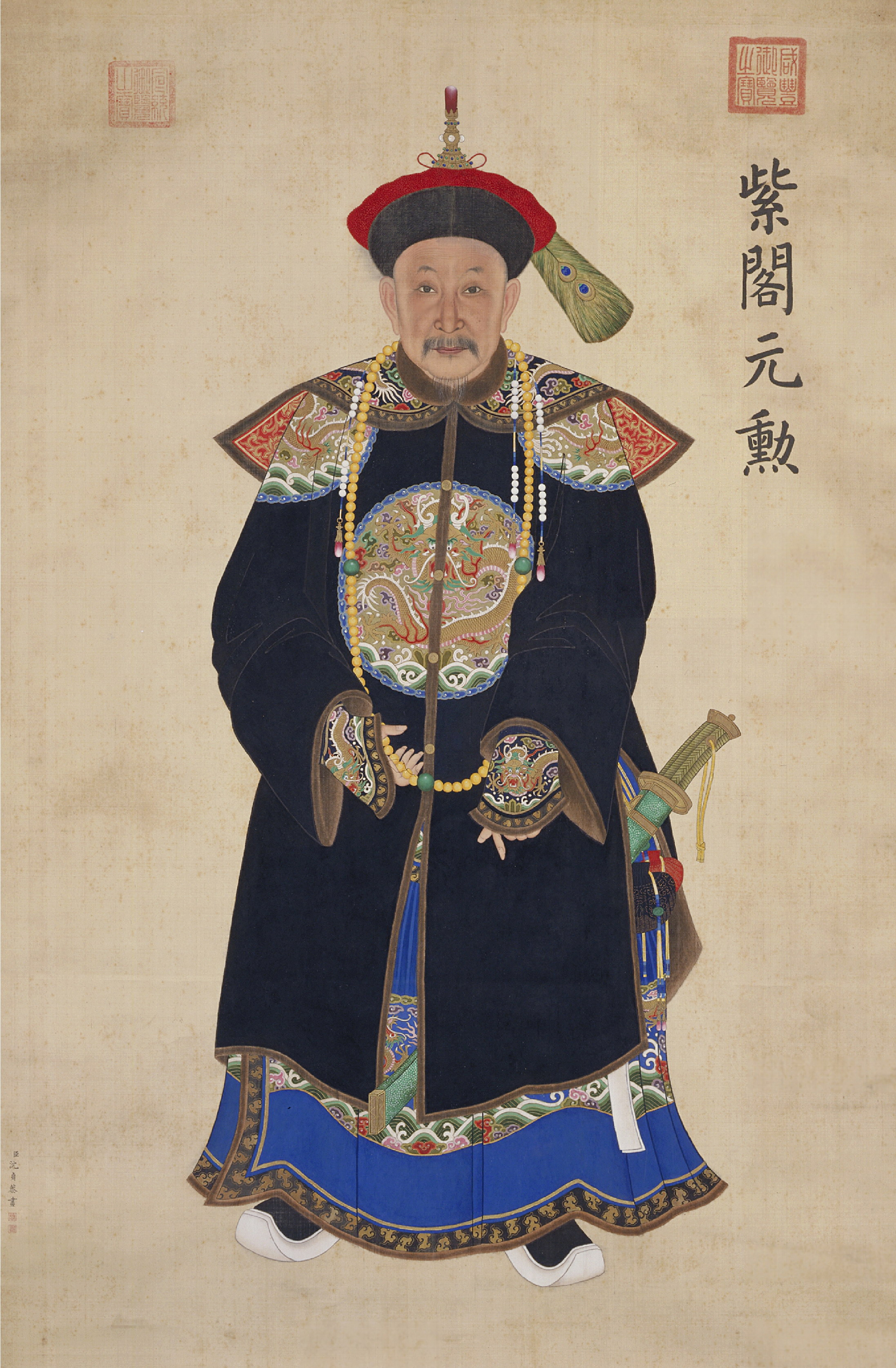
Agui's portrait

Slob Dpon died in 1760. His nephew Lang Kashi inherited the throne as the new Tusi of Greater Jinchuan. Lang Kashi wanted to fulfill his uncle's legacy and wishes of becoming the new Tibetan King. He united some Tusi, recruited warriors, built defenses and implemented anti-Qing education in Jinchuan. After Lang Kashi passed away a few years later, his son Sonom took the Tusi's name. Skal bzang (Chinese: 僧格桑) was a friend of Sonom, they dropped the family hatred and formed a military alliance.

Sonom launched a sudden strike against Geshitsa Tusi (革什咱土司) in 1771. Skal bzang attacked other Tusi. Qianlong announced a second campaign against Jinchuan. This time Qianlong was determined to end the Tusi system in Sichuan. The governor of Sichuan Artai led 20,000 troops to attack Skal bzang. The conquest made no progress in six months. Qianlong dismissed him as the governor. Later on, Wenfu the Grand Secretariat was appointed as the overall commander. Guilin became the governor of Sichuan and the vice overall commander. Wenfu led the west front to attack Lesser Jinchuan, and Guilin struck from the south. Wenfu was unstoppable, but Guilin's general Xue Zong was surrounded by the enemy at Heilong Valley in Kangding. 30,000 troops were killed. Guilin did not reinforce Xue Zong's army and then was executed by Qianlong. The emperor needed a general to secure the victory, so he appointed the "Iron General" who just returned from conquering Burma, Agui, as the overall commander.

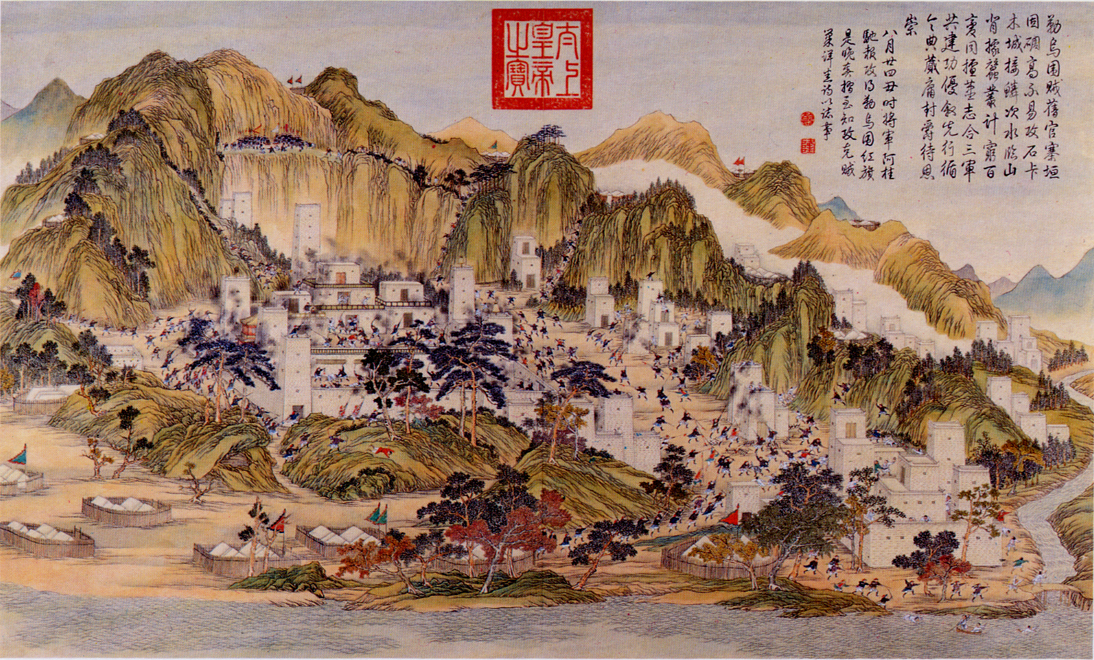
The Conquest of Geer Cliff

Agui was a smart and brave general. In November 1772, Agui realized that Skal bzang's command post was located in Meidu Lama Temple, north of the Lesser Jinchuan Stream. He took 4,000 soldiers with him and crossed the stream under the moonlight. They captured the temple, but Skal bzang escaped to Greater Jinchuan. Agui sent a message to Sonom promising that if he handed over Skal bzang, the Qing army would retreat and admit his role as the Tibet King. Sonom refused his request.

Wenfu and Agui joined forces in Lesser Jinchuan in 1773. They stationed the army near Meidu and were waiting for spring to launch the second wave of offense. Unexpectedly, Greater Jinchuan gathered elite forces and struck during a snow storm. They occupied the military granary of the Qing army. Wenfu's force fought without supplies, and Wenfu was killed during the battle. Agui retreated, and Gyalrongs retook the Lesser Jinchuan.

Qianlong was surprised by how long this campaign went on. He ordered an immediate reinforcement with stockpiles of firearms and imported heavy cannons for Agui's army. Qianlong wanted to end the war at any cost. Agui executed the high orders. The Qing army started to massacre Gyalrong people to cut the army resource of Jinchuan. Agui conquered many fortresses, then reached Geer Cliff, Sonom's stronghold, in 1775. Agui started a siege and cut off the water supply of Geer Cliff. Sonom accepted Agui's terms of surrender. He poisoned Skal bzang and sent his corpse to Agui. Agui refused to accept the surrender because Qianlong did not want to see a third campaign against Jinchuan. In 1775, Agui commanded an assault. The Qing army occupied the outskirts of Geer Cliff. Sonom retreated into the fort. In 1776, the Qing army launched its final attack on Geer Cliff with cannons. Sonom gave up the hopeless resistance. The second campaign against Jinchuan had ended.

== Aftermath ==
=== Results ===
The Qing's decisive victory against Jinchuan rebel Tusi was documented by historical records. Qianlong was very happy about the fact that Jinchuan was defeated by his Army of Heaven. Later on, the Bureaucratization of Tusi proceeded in this region. The tribal administration was abolished, while Tusi were exiled or executed. The central government established states and counties in Sichuan, solidified control over the minorities and increased cultural exchange between Zhongyuan (Chinese: 中原) and border areas. This led to the foundation of Han domination in Southwest China. It ended the slavery societies in Sichuan, Guizhou and Yunnan. The campaigns against Jinchuan symbolized the absolute power of the Qing central government while confirming the centralization of the empire's territory and administration.

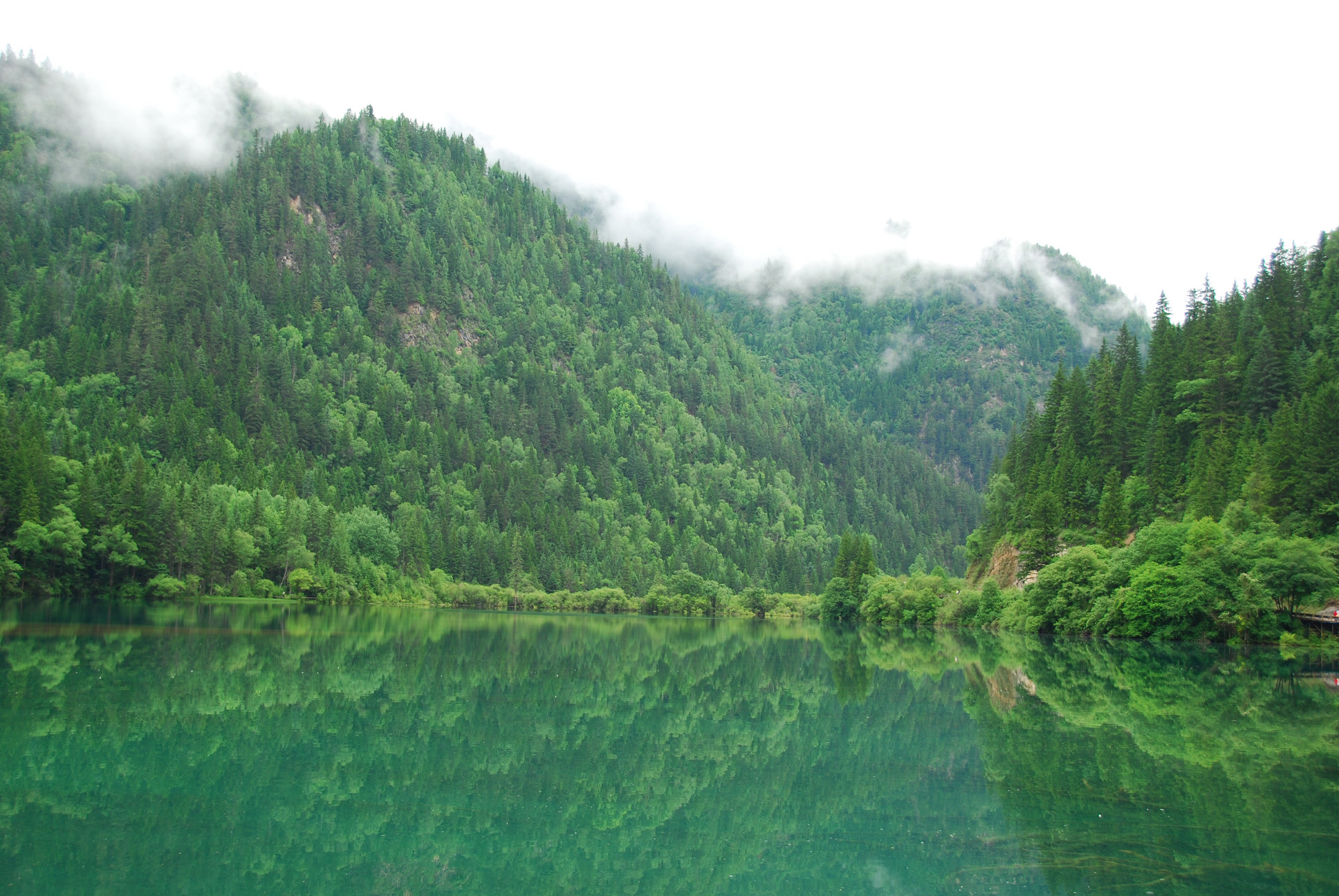
Aba County today

=== Significance ===
Among Qianlong's Ten Great Campaigns, the war against the Dzungars costed 23 million silver taels, and expanded the territory of the Qing by over 1,500,000km^{2}. The campaign in Burma made Burma a tributary state and only 70,000 troops fought in the war. But the Qing gained nothing from the two campaigns against Jinchuan. 180% of the nation's annual revenue was spent, and 600,000 troops fought in a 40,000km^{2} region for over 9 years. The second campaign could have been avoided by abolishing the Tusi system in 1749. Compared to the total cost of 130 million silver taels of Qianlong's Ten Great Campaigns, the tremendous relative cost of the Jinchuan campaigns accelerated the economic crisis of the Qing dynasty. This economic crisis would ultimately indirectly lead to the fall of the empire. However, the campaigns unified China proper and improved the stature of the imperial court and its policies.

== Gallery ==
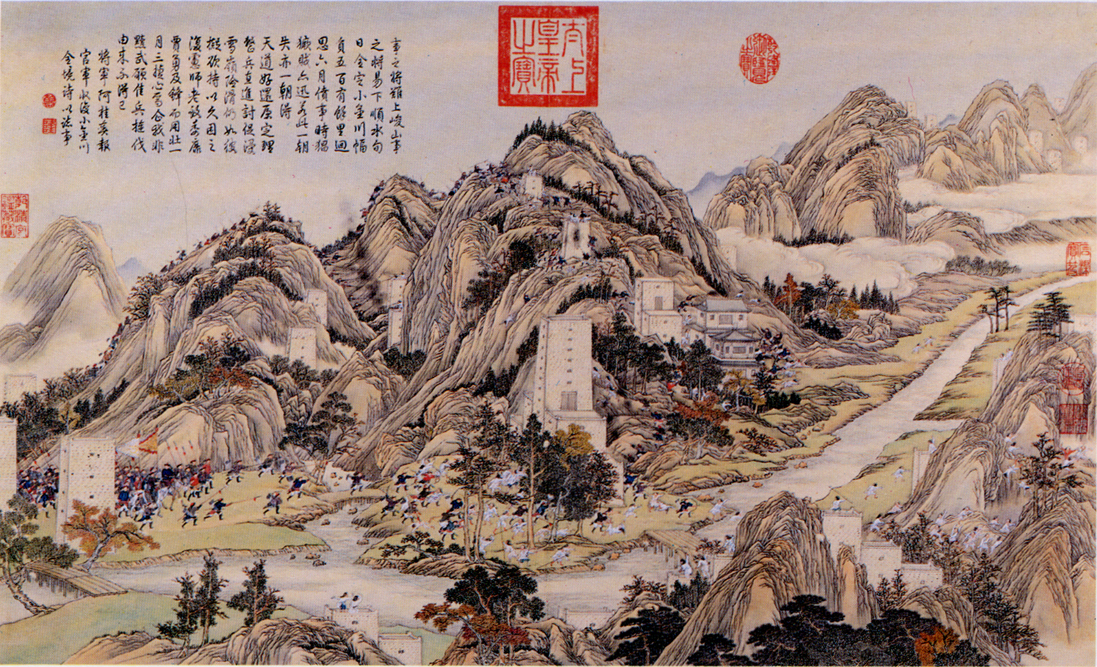
"Reconquer the little Goldstreamland", a scene of the Jinchuan Campaign 1771-1776

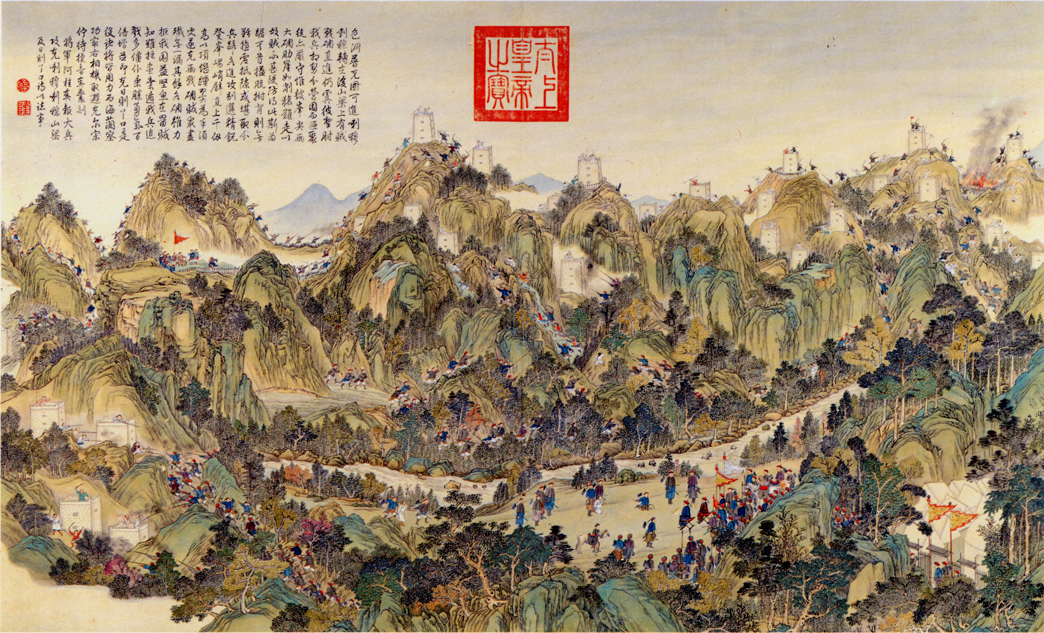
"Conquest of Lamu and Rizi"

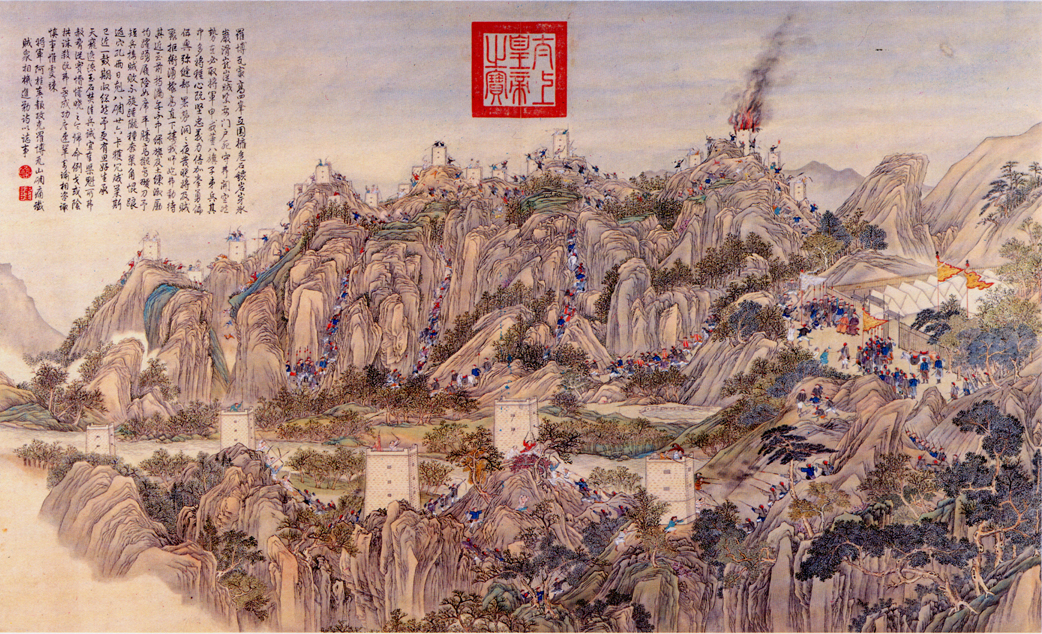
"Conquest of the defence tower at the Luobowa mountain"

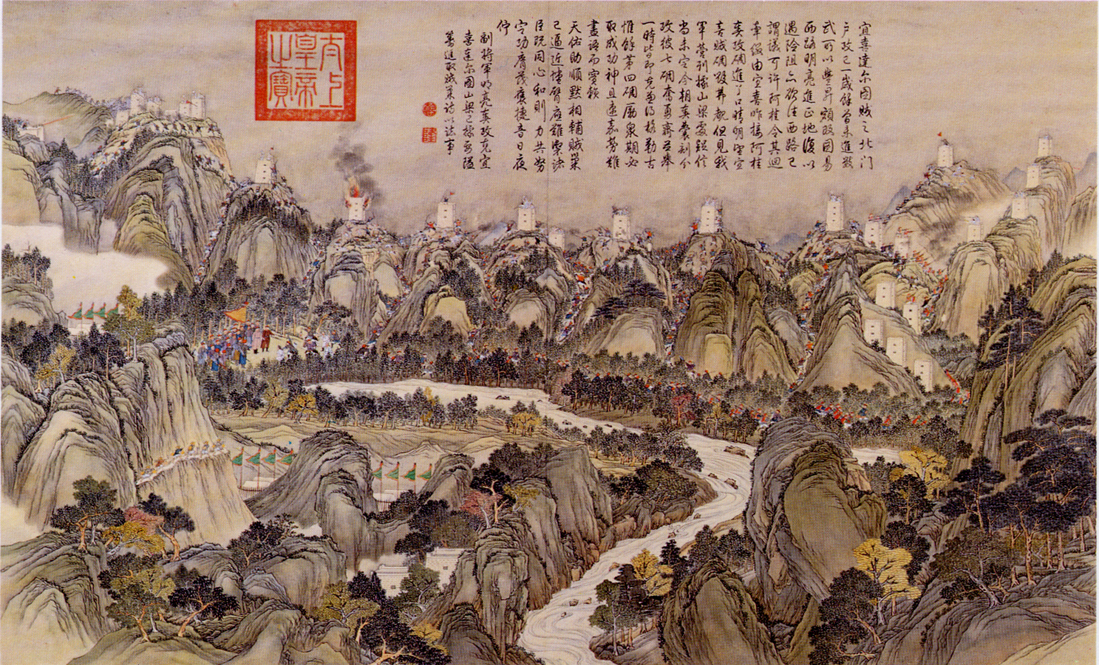
"Conquest of the mountain range at Yixi and Daertu"

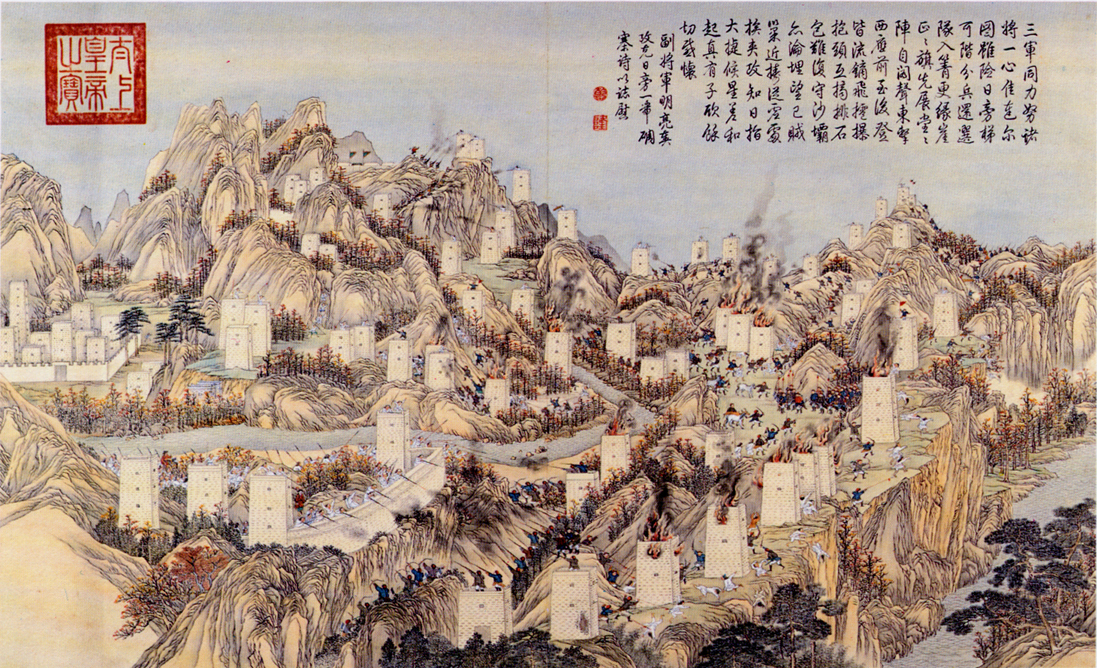
"Conquest of the mountain Ripang and others"

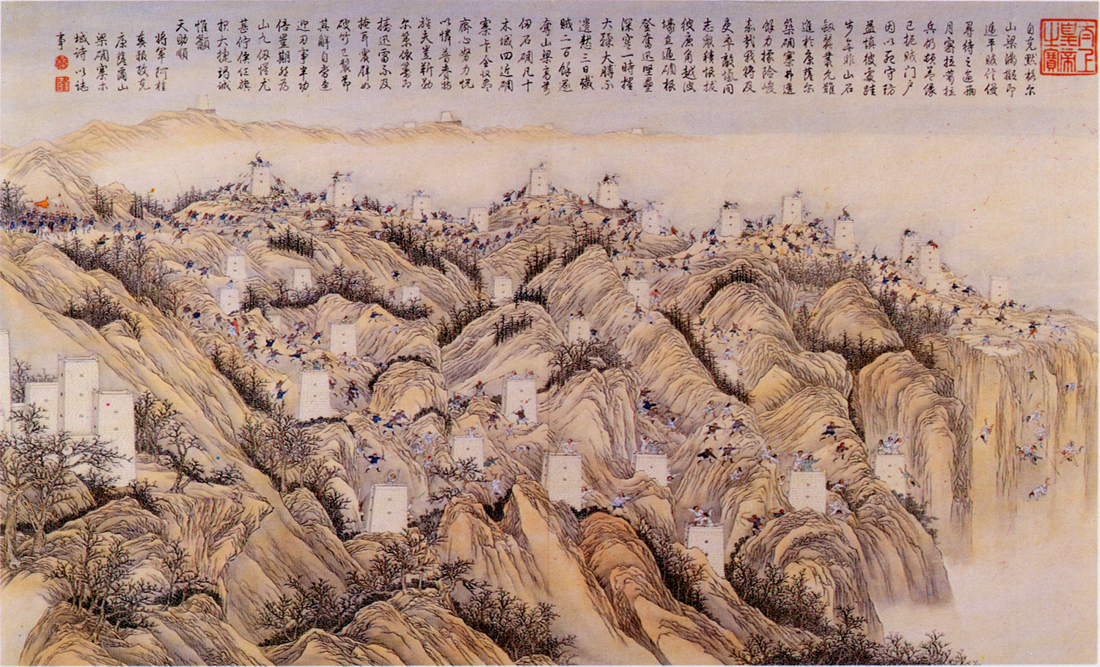
"Conquest of the Kangsaer mountain range"

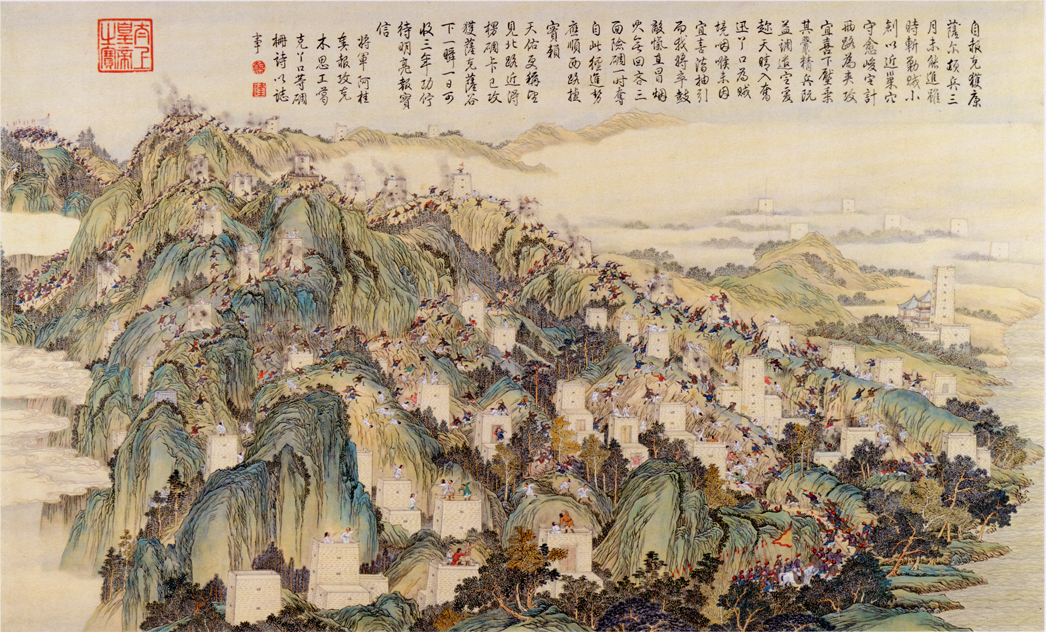
"Conquest of the Musigonggake valley"

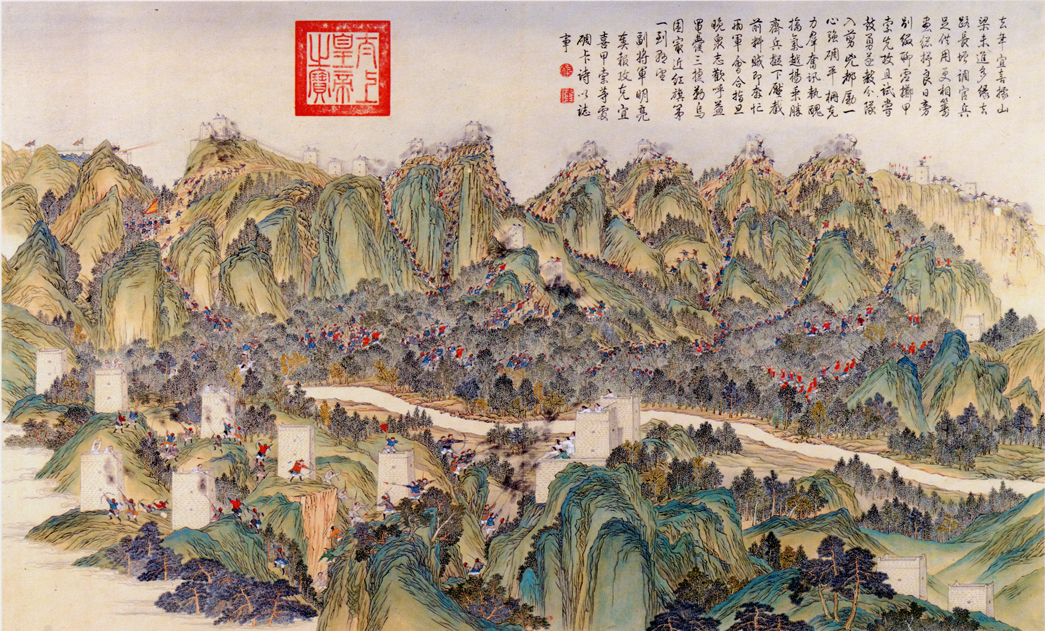
"Conquest of Yixi, Yiasuo and others"

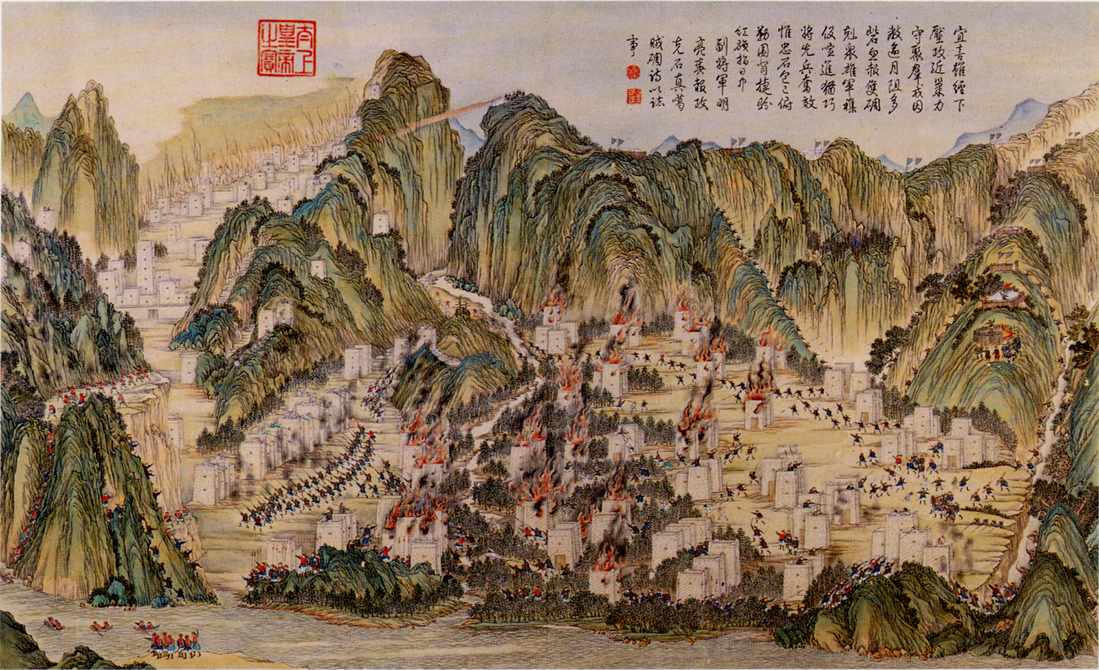
"Conquest of Shizhenga"

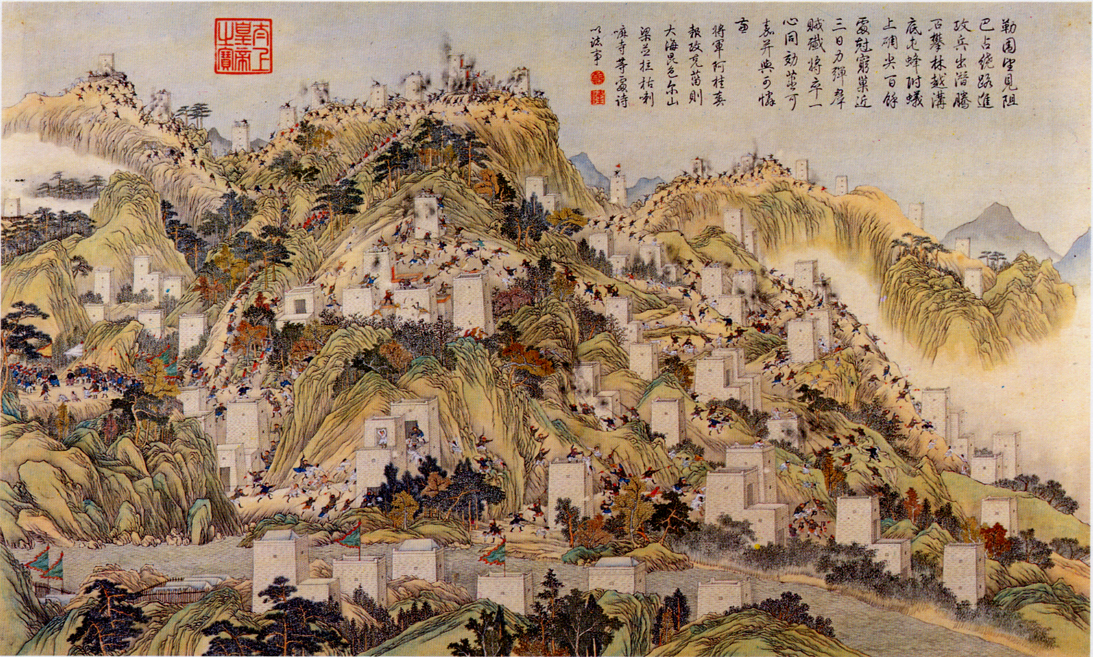
"Conquest of the Kunser mountain range at Zaizedahai and the lama temple Ragu"

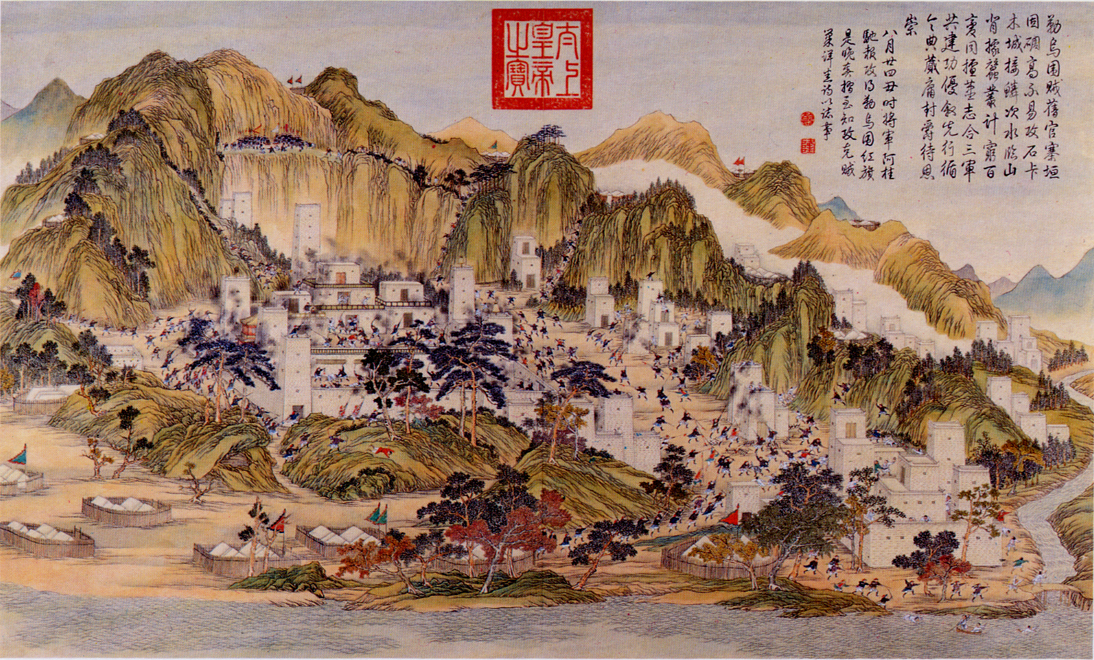
"Conquest of Zeichao"

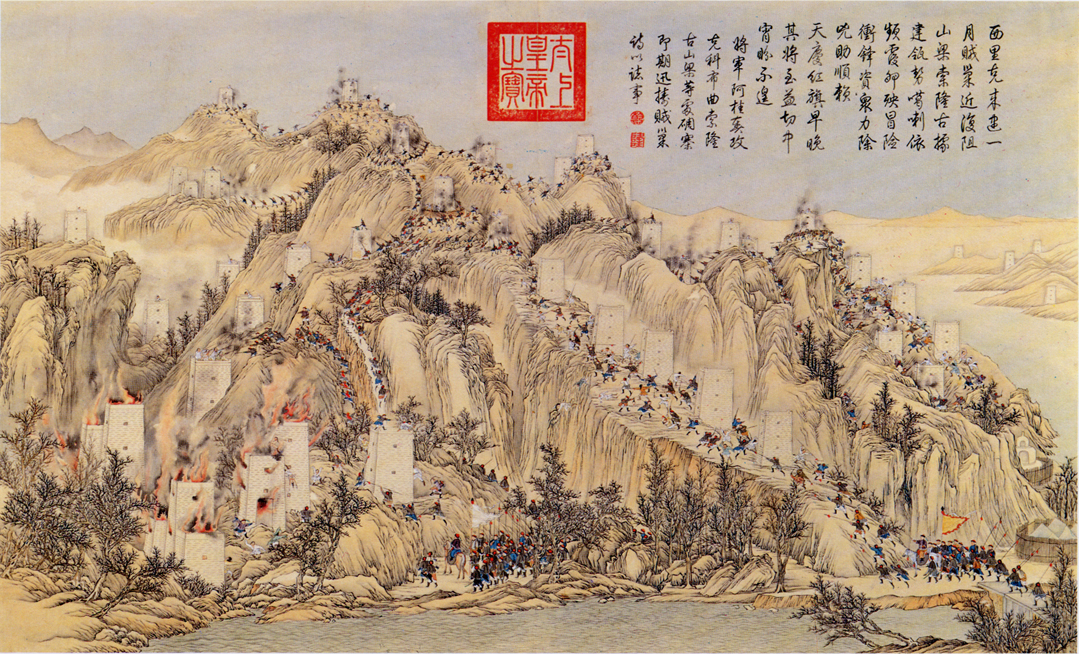
"Conquest of the mountain range Kebuqu and Suolonggu and others"

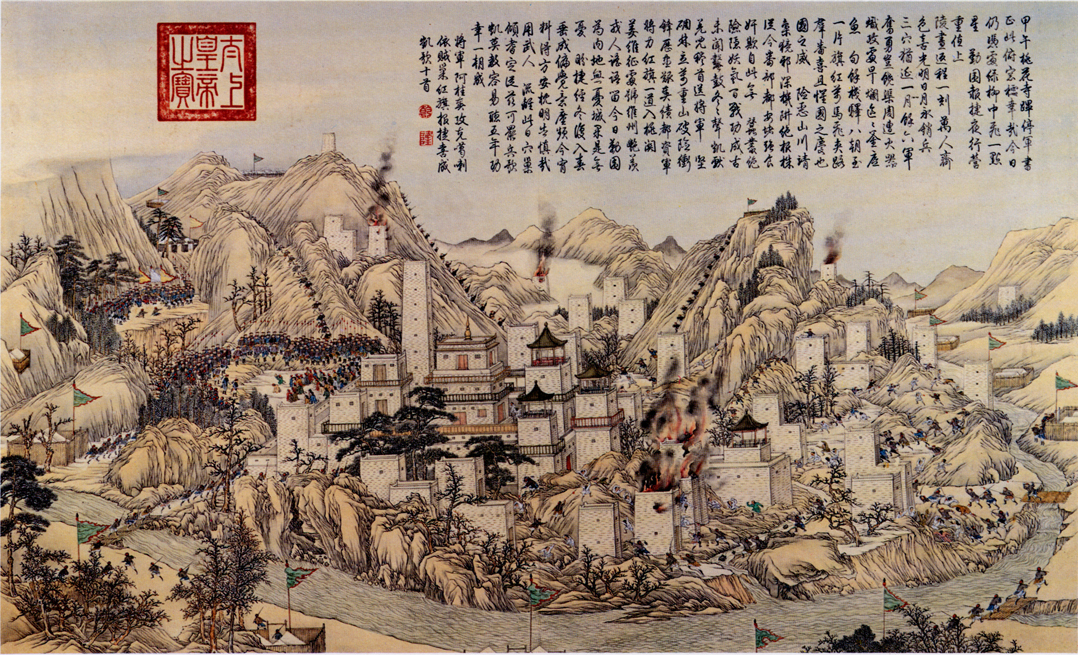
"Victory promulgation of the conquest of Gelayi"

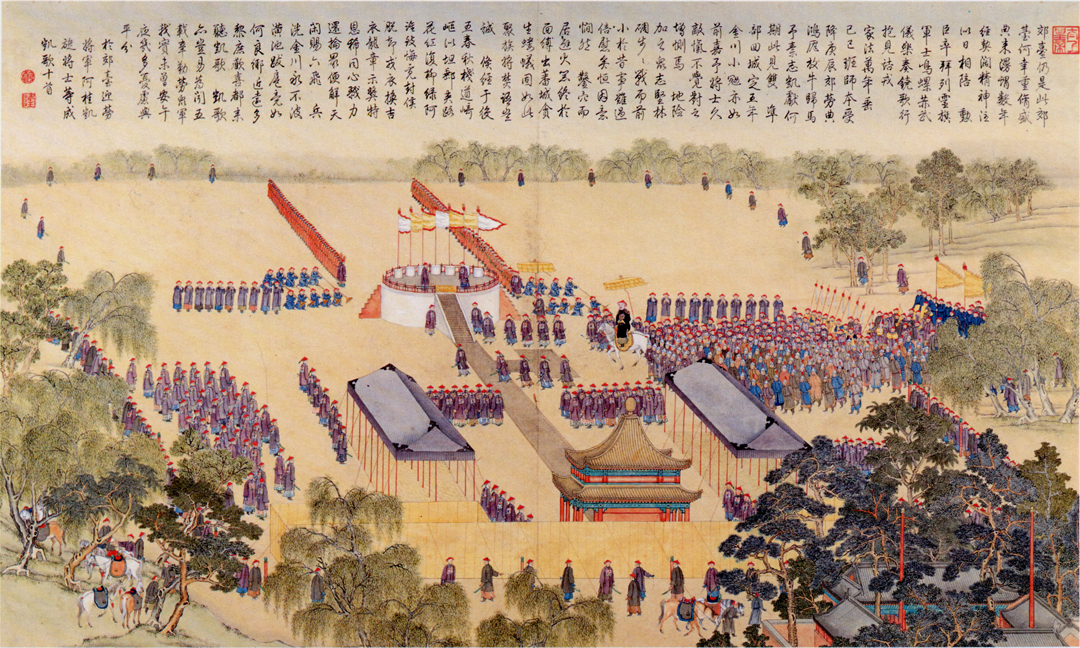
"Victorious Return"

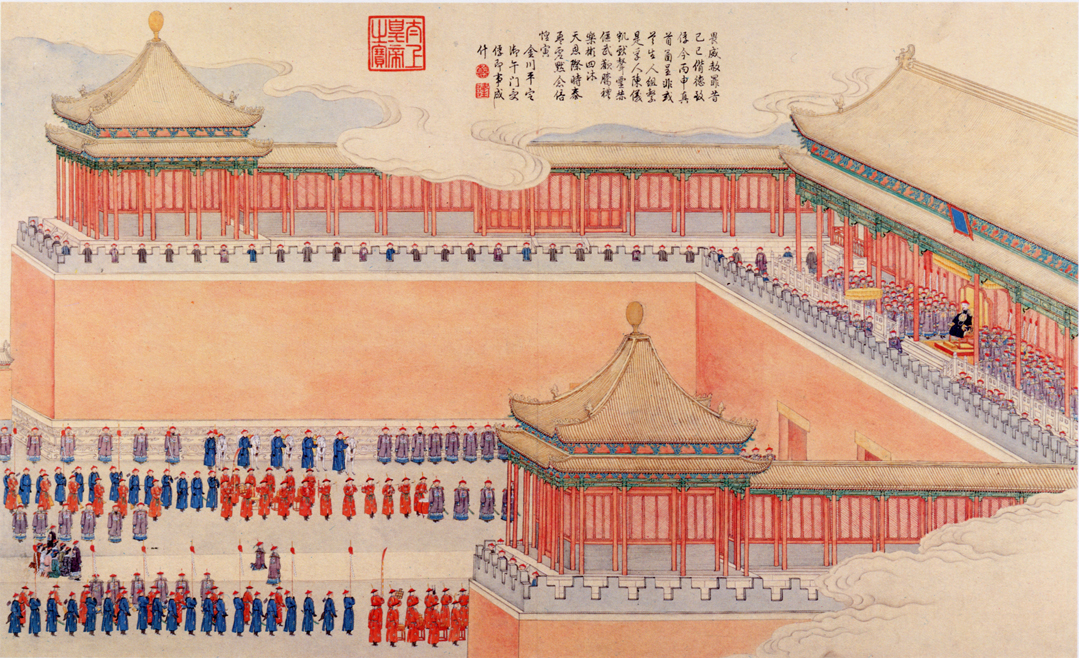
The Qianlong Emperor is presented with prisoners of the Jinchuan Campaign 1771-1776

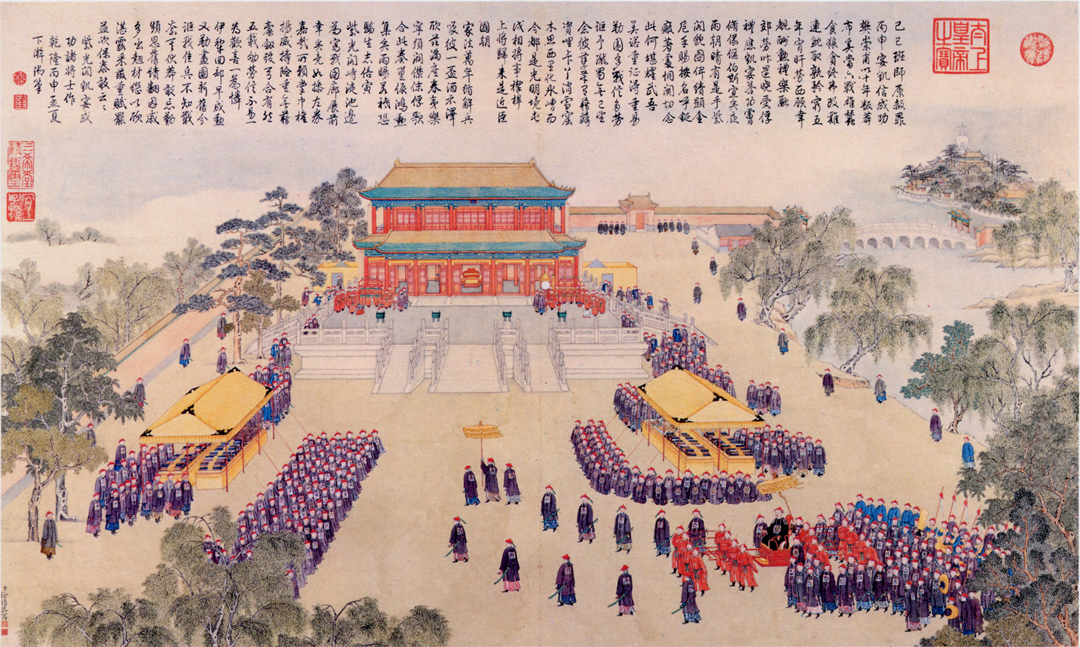
A banquet held at the Hall of Purple Glaze in honor of the victorious Chinese army of the Jinchuan Campaign 1771-1776

== See also ==
- Ten Great Campaigns
