= Ten Great Campaigns =

1755–1789 Chinese military campaigns

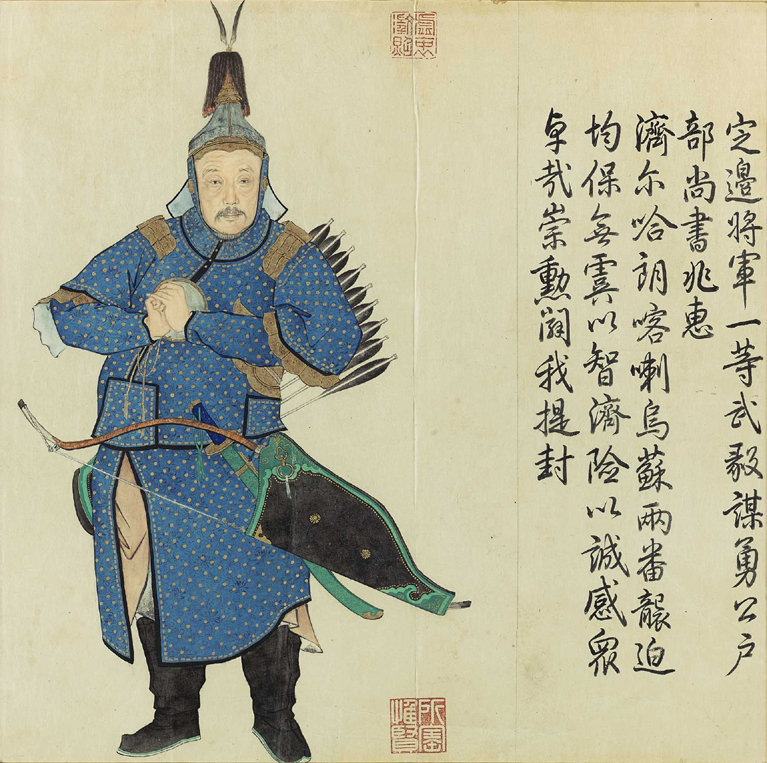
Qing general Zhaohui led the fight against the Dzungar Khanate

The Ten Great Campaigns (Chinese: 十全武功; pinyin: Shíquán Wǔgōng) were a series of military campaigns launched by the Qing dynasty of China in the mid–late 18th century during the reign of the Qianlong Emperor (r. 1735–1796). They included three to enlarge the area of Qing control in Inner Asia: two against the Dzungars (1755–1757) and the pacification of Xinjiang (1758–1759). The other seven campaigns were more in the nature of police actions on frontiers already established: two wars against the Gyalrong of Jinchuan, Sichuan, another against the Taiwanese aboriginals (1787–1788), and four expeditions abroad against the Burmese (1765–1769), the Vietnamese (1788–1789), and the Gurkhas on the border between Tibet and Nepal (1790–1792), with the last group having two campaigns waged against them.

== Campaigns ==
=== Three campaigns against the Dzungars and the pacification of Xinjiang (1755–1759) ===
Of the ten campaigns, the final destruction of the Dzungars (or Zunghars) was the most significant. The 1755 pacification of Dzungaria and the later suppression of the Revolt of the Altishahr Khojas secured the northern and western boundaries of Xinjiang, eliminated rivalry for control over the Dalai Lama in Tibet, and thereby eliminated any rival influence in Mongolia.

==== First campaign ====
First campaign against the Dzungars
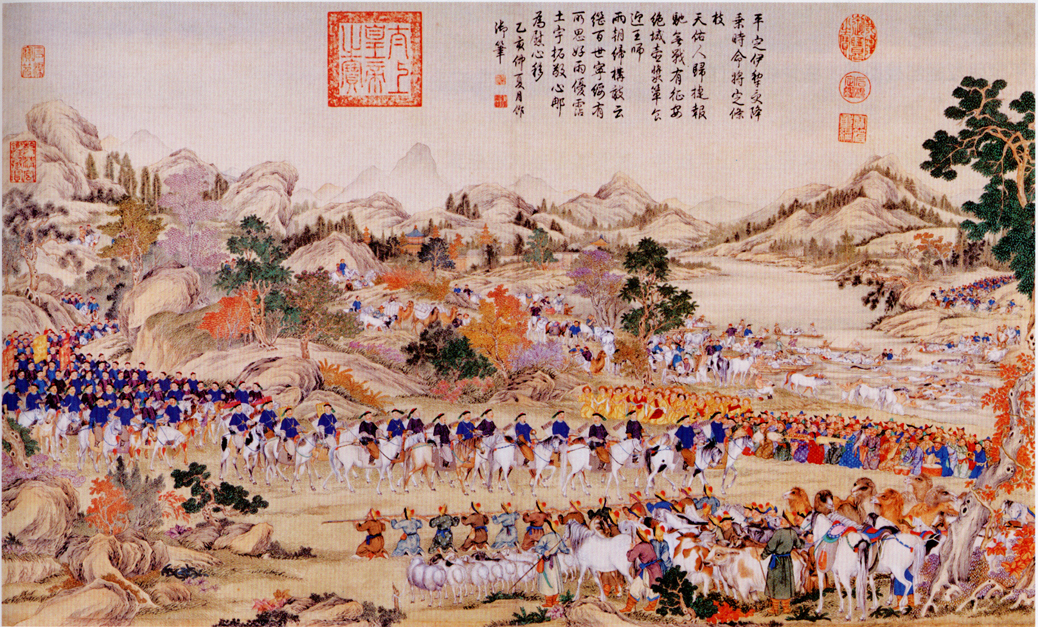
- Surrender of Dawachi Khan in 1755
Date	1755
Location	Xinjiang
Result	Qing victory
Territorial changes	Qing conquest of Xinjiang

Belligerents
Qing dynasty	Dzungar Khanate

Commanders and leaders
Qianlong Emperor; Bandi (Overall Command); Zhaohui (Assistant Commander); Emin Khoja; Amursana; Burhān al-Dīn; Khwāja-i Jahān	Dawachi (POW)

Strength
9,000 Manchu Eight Bannermen; 19,500 Inner Mongols; 6,500 Outer Mongols; 2,000 Zunghars; 5,000 Uyghurs from Hami and Turfan; 12,000 Chinese	7,000

Casualties and losses
Unknown	Unknown

In 1752, Dawachi and the Khoit-Oirat prince Amursana competed for the title of Khan of the Dzungars. Dawachi defeated Amursana various times and gave him no chance to recover. Amursana was thus forced to flee with his small army to the Qing imperial court. The Qianlong Emperor pledged to support Amursana since Amursana accepted Qing authority; among those who supported Amursana and the Chinese were the Khoja brothers Burhān al-Dīn and Khwāja-i Jahān. In 1755, Qianlong sent the Manchu general Zhaohui, who was aided by Amursana, Burhān al-Dīn and Khwāja-i Jahān, to lead a campaign against the Dzungars. After several skirmishes and small scale battles along the river Ili, the Qing army led by Zhaohui approached Ili (Gulja) and forced Dawachi to surrender. Qianlong appointed Amursana as the Khan of Khoit and one of four equal khans – much to the displeasure of Amursana, who wanted to be the Khan of the Dzungars.

==== Second campaign ====
Second campaign against the Dzungars
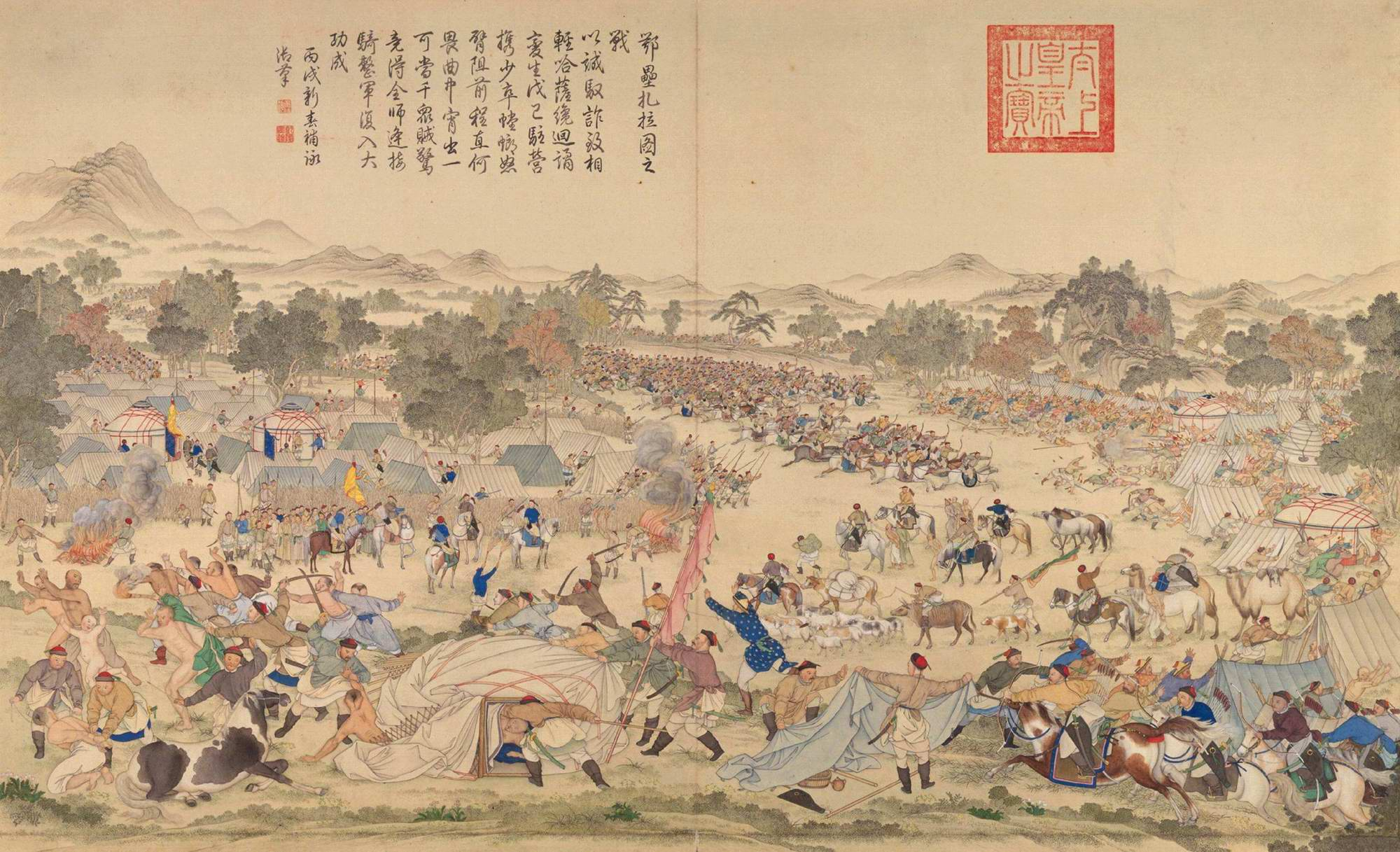
- The Battle of Oroi-Jalatu in 1758, Zhao Hui ambushes Amursana at night.
Date	1756–1758
Location	Xinjiang
Result	Qing victory

Belligerents
Qing dynasty	Dzungars loyal to Amursana

Commanders and leaders
Qianlong Emperor; Bandi †(1757) (Overall Command until death in battle); Cäbdan-jab (Overall Command); Zhaohui (Assistant Commander); Ayushi; Emin Khoja; Burhān al-Dīn; Khwāja-i Jahān	Amursana; Chingünjav †

Strength
10,000 Bannermen; 5,000 Uyghurs from Turfan and Hami; Plus Zunghars	20,000 Dzungars

Casualties and losses
Unknown	Everyone defeated except for 50 men of Chingünjav who fled 70%–80% of the Dzungar population

In the summer of 1756, Amursana started a Dzungar revolt against the Chinese with the help of Prince Chingünjav. The Qing dynasty reacted at the start of 1757 and sent General Zhaohui with support from Burhān al-Dīn and Khwāja-i Jahān. Among several battles, the most important ones were illustrated in Qianlong's paintings. The Dzungar leader Ayushi defected to the Qing side and attacked the Dzungar camp at Gadan-Ola (Battle of Gadan-Ola).

General Zhaohui defeated the Dzungars in two battles: the Battle of Oroi-Jalatu (1758) and the Battle of Khurungui (1758). In the first battle, Zhaohui attacked Amursana's camp at night; Amursana was able to fight on until Zhaohui received enough reinforcements to drive him away. Between the time of Oroi-Jalatu and Khurungui, the Chinese under Prince Cäbdan-jab defeated Amursana at the Battle of Khorgos (known in the Qianlong engravings as the "Victory of Khorgos"). At Mount Khurungui, Zhaohui defeated Amursana in a night attack on his camp after crossing a river and drove him back. To commemorate Zhaohui's two victories, Qianlong had the Puning Temple of Chengde constructed, home to the world's tallest wooden sculpture of the bodhisattva Avalokiteśvara and hence its alternate name, the "Big Buddha Temple". Afterwards, Khojis of Us-Turfan submitted to the Qing dynasty. After all of these battles, Amursana fled to Russia (where he died) while Chingünjav fled north to Darkhad but was captured at Wang Tolgoi and executed in Beijing.

==== Third campaign ====
Campaign in Altishahr (Pacification of Xinjiang)
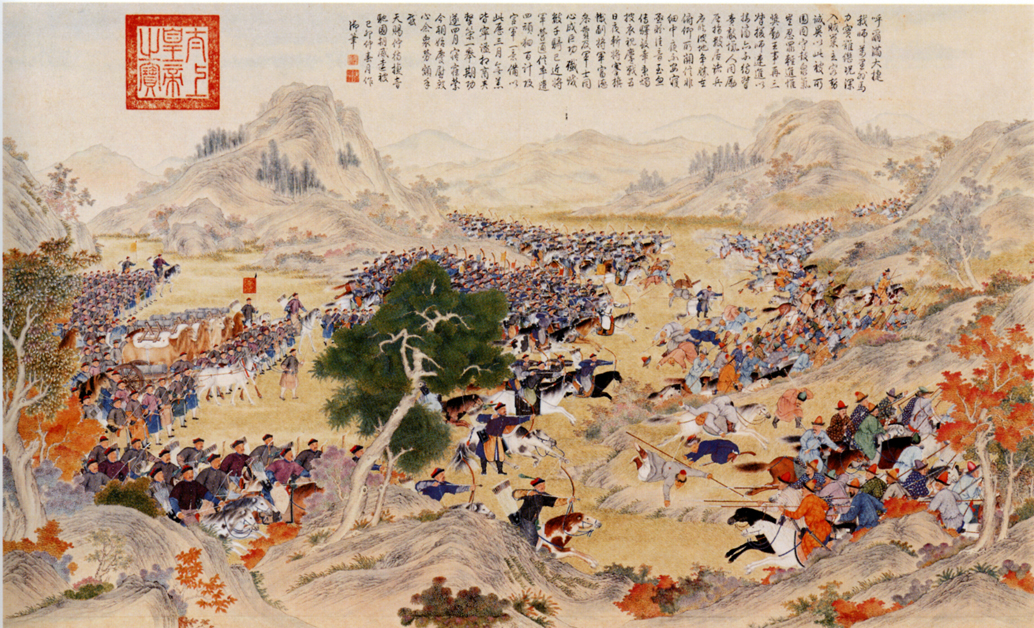
- The Battle of Qurman 1759, Fude and Machang bring 600 troops to relieve Zhaohui in the Black River.
Date	1758–1759
Location	Xinjiang
Result	Qing victory

Belligerents
Qing dynasty	Altishahri followers of the Khoja brothers Kyrgyzs; Dzungar rebels

Commanders and leaders
Qianlong Emperor; Zhaohui (Overall Command); Fude (Assistant Commander); Agui; Doubin; Rongbao; Zhanyinbao; Fulu; Shuhede; Mingrui; Arigun; Machang; Namjil †; Yan Xiangshi; Yisamu; Duanjibu; Khoja Emin; Khoja Si Bek; Sultan Shah of Badakhshan	Khwāja-i Jahān (POW); Burhān al-Dīn (POW)

Strength
10,000 Bannermen; Uyghurs from Hami, Turfan and Badakshan; Plus Zunghars	30,000 Altishahr (Tarim Basin) Uyghurs

Casualties and losses
Unknown	Unknown

==== Revolt of the Altishahr Khojas (1757–1759) ====
After the second campaign against the Dzungars in 1758, two Altishahr nobles, the Khoja brothers Burhān al-Dīn and Khwāja-i Jahān, started a revolt against the Qing dynasty. Apart from the remaining Dzungars, they were also joined by the Kyrgyz peoples and the Oases Turkic peoples (Uyghurs) in Altishahr (the Tarim Basin). After capturing several towns in Altishahr, there were still two rebel fortresses at Yarkand and Kashgar at the end of 1758. Uyghur Muslims from Turfan and Hami, including Emin Khoja and Khoja Si Bek, remained loyal to the Qing dynasty and helped the Qing regime fight the Altishahri Uyghurs under Burhān al-Dīn and Khwāja-i Jahān. Zhaohui unsuccessfully besieged Yarkand and fought an indecisive battle outside the city; this engagement is historically known as the Battle of Tonguzluq. Zhaohui instead took other towns east of Yarkand but was forced to retreat; the Dzungar and Uyghur rebels laid siege to him at the siege of Black River (Kara Usu). In 1759, Zhaohui asked for reinforcements and 600 troops were sent, under the overall command of generals Fude and Machang, with the 200 cavalry led by Namjil; other high-ranking officers included Arigun, Doubin, Duanjibu, Fulu, Yan Xiangshi, Janggimboo, Yisamu, Agui and Shuhede. On 3 February 1759, over 5,000 enemy cavalry led by Burhān al-Dīn ambushed the 600 relief troops at the Battle of Qurman. The Uyghur and Dzungar cavalry were stopped by the Qing zamburak artillery camels, musketry, and archers; Namjil and Machang led a cavalry charge on one of the flanks. Namjil was killed while Machang was unseated from horseback and was forced to fight on foot with his bow. After a hard-fought battle, the Qing forces emerged victorious and attacked the Dzungar camp, causing the Dzungars besieging the Black River to withdraw. After the victory at Qurman, the Qing army overran the remaining rebel towns. Mingrui led a detachment of cavalry and defeated Dzungar cavalry at the Battle of Qos-Qulaq. The Uyghurs retreated from Qos-Qulaq but were defeated by Zhaohui and Fude at the Battle of Arcul (Altishahr) on 1 September 1759. The rebels were defeated again at the Battle of Yesil Kol Nor. After these defeats, Burhān al-Dīn and Khwāja-i Jahān fled with their small army of supporters to Badakhshan. Sultan Shah of Badakhshan promised to protect them but he contacted the Qing dynasty and promised to turn them over. When the fleeing rebels came to the Sultan's capital, he attacked them and captured them. When the Qing army reached Sultan Shah's capital, he handed over the captured rebels to them and submitted to the Qing dynasty. In later years, Durrani Afghanistan and the Khanate of Bukhara invaded Badakhshan and killed Sultan Shah for betraying Khojas to the Qing, while the latter did not respond.

=== Suppression of the Jinchuan hill peoples (1747–1749, 1771–1776) ===
==== First campaign ====
First campaign against Jinchuan
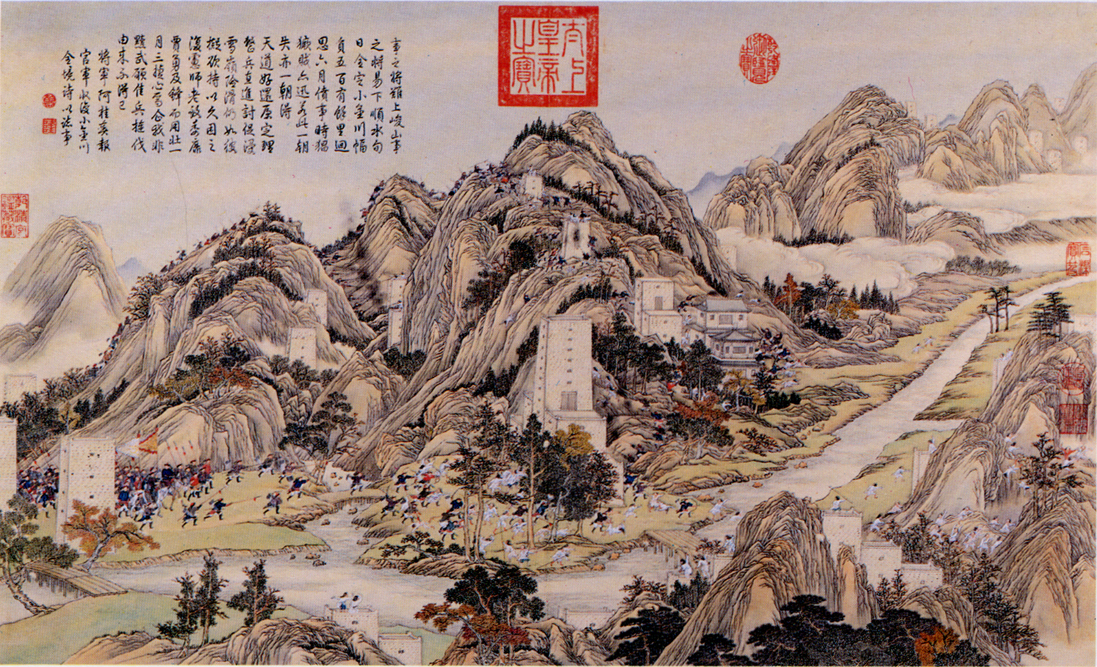
- Depiction of Qing troops on a campaign in Jinchuan ("Gold Stream")
Date	1747–1749
Location	Sichuan
Result	Qing victory

Belligerents
Qing dynasty	Jinchuan tribes

Commanders and leaders
Qianlong Emperor; Zhang Guangsi (Overall Command) (Executed by Qianlong); Necin (Assistant Commander) (Executed by Qianlong); Fuheng (Overall Command); Zhaohui (Assistant Commander)	Slob Dpon; Tshe Dbang

Strength
Unknown	Unknown

Casualties and losses
Unknown	Unknown

The suppression of Jinchuan was the costliest and most difficult, and also the most destructive of the Ten Great Campaigns. Jinchuan (lit. 'Golden Stream') was located northwest of Chengdu in western Sichuan. Its residents were the Gyalrong tribes, related to the Tibetans of Amdo. The first campaign in 1747–1749 was a simple affair; with little use of force the Qing army induced the native chieftains to accept a peace plan, and departed.

==== Second campaign ====
Second campaign against Jinchuan
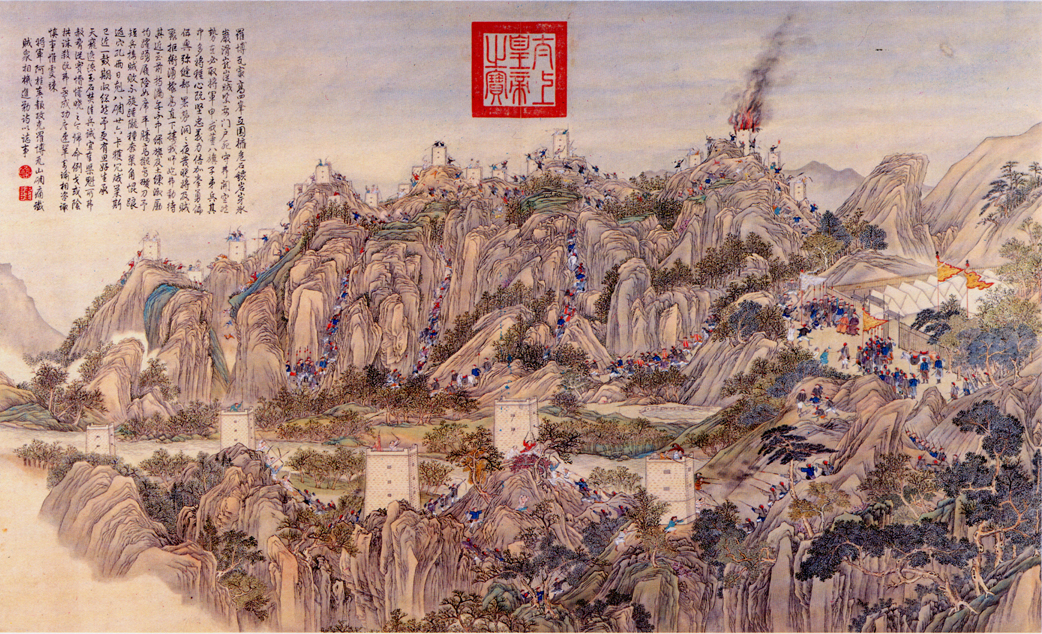
- Qing general Fuk'anggan assaults Luobowa mountain tower
Date	1771–1776
Location	Sichuan
Result	Qing victory

Belligerents
Qing dynasty	Jinchuan tribes

Commanders and leaders
Qianlong Emperor; Agui (Overall Command); Fuk'anggan (Assistant Commander); Fude (Executed by Qianlong in 1776); Wenfu †	Sonom; Senggesang

Strength
8,000	Unknown

Casualties and losses
Unknown	Unknown

Interethnic conflict brought Qing intervention back after 20 years. The result was the Qing forces being forced to fight a protracted war of attrition costing the Imperial Treasury several times the amounts expended on the earlier conquests of the Dzungars and Xinjiang. The resisting tribes retreated to their stone towers and forts in steep mountains and could only be dislodged by cannon fire. The Qing generals were ruthless in annihilating the local Gyalrong Tibetans, then reorganised the region in a military prefecture and repopulated it with more cooperative inhabitants. When victorious troops returned to Beijing, a celebratory hymn was sung in their honour. A Manchu version of the hymn was recorded by the French Jesuit Jean Joseph Marie Amiot and sent to Paris.

=== Campaigns in Burma (1765–1769) ===
The Qianlong Emperor launched four invasions of Burma between 1765 and 1769. The war claimed the lives of over 70,000 Qing soldiers and four commanders, and is sometimes described as "the most disastrous frontier war that the Qing dynasty had ever waged", and one that "assured Burmese independence and probably the independence of other states in Southeast Asia". The successful Burmese defence laid the foundation for the present-day boundary between Myanmar and China.

==== First and second invasion ====
At first, Qianlong envisaged an easy war, and sent in only the Green Standard troops stationed in Yunnan. The Qing invasion came as the majority of Burmese forces were deployed in the Burmese invasion of the Siamese Ayutthaya Kingdom. Nonetheless, battle-hardened Burmese troops defeated the first two invasions of 1765 and 1766 at the border. The regional conflict now escalated to a major war that involved military maneuvers nationwide in both countries.

==== Third invasion ====
The third invasion (1767–1768) led by the elite Manchu Bannermen nearly succeeded, penetrating deep into central Burma within a few days' march from the capital, Ava. However, the Bannermen of northern China could not cope with unfamiliar tropical terrains and lethal endemic diseases, and were driven back with heavy losses. After the close-call, King Hsinbyushin redeployed most of the Burmese armies from Siam to the Chinese border. The successful Burmese defence laid the foundation for the present-day boundary between Myanmar and China.

The Qing Qianlong Emperor ordered Manchu general Eledeng'e (also spelled E'erdeng'e (額爾登額) or possibly 額爾景額) to be sliced to death after his commander Mingrui was defeated at the Battle of Maymyo in the Sino-Burmese War in 1768 because Eledeng'i was not able to help flank Mingrui when he did not arrive at a rendezvous.

==== Fourth invasion ====
The fourth and largest invasion got bogged down at the frontier. With the Qing forces completely encircled, a truce was reached between the field commanders of the two sides in December 1769.

==== Aftermath ====
The Qing forces maintained a heavy military presence in the border areas of Yunnan for about a decade in an attempt to wage another war while imposing a ban on inter-border trade for two decades. The Burmese were also preoccupied with another impending invasion by the Qing dynasty, and kept a series of garrisons along the border. After twenty years, Burma and the Qing dynasty resumed a diplomatic relationship in 1790. To the Burmese, the resumption was on equal terms. However, the Qianlong Emperor unilaterally interpreted the act as Burmese submission, and claimed victory. Ironically, the main beneficiaries of this war were the Siamese. After having lost their capital Ayutthaya to the Burmese in 1767, they regrouped in the absence of large Burmese armies, and reclaimed their territories over the next two years.

=== Taiwan rebellion (1786–1788) ===
In 1786, the Qing-appointed Governor of Taiwan, Sun Jingsui, discovered and suppressed the anti-Qing Tiandihui (Heaven and Earth Society). The Tiandihui members gathered Ming loyalists, and their leader Lin Shuangwen proclaimed himself king. Many important people took part in this revolt and the insurgents quickly rose to 50,000 people. In less than a year, the rebels occupied almost all of southern Taiwan. Hearing that the rebels had occupied most of Taiwan, Qing troops were sent to suppress them in a hurry. The east insurgents defeated the poorly organised troops and had to resist falling to the enemy. Finally, the Qing imperial court sent Fuk'anggan while Hailancha, Counsellor of the Police, deployed nearly 3,000 people to fight the insurgents. These new troops were well equipped, disciplined and had combat experience which proved enough to rout the insurgents. The Ming loyalists had lost the war and their leaders and remaining rebels hid among the locals.

Lin Shuangwen, Zhuang Datian and other Tiandihui leaders had started a rebellion. The Qing general Fuk'anggan quelled the rebellion with a force of 20,000 soldiers and executed Lin Shuangwen.

=== Two campaigns against the Gurkhas (1788–1793) ===
The campaigns against the Gurkhas displayed the Qing imperial court's continuing sensitivity to conditions in Tibet.

==== First campaign ====
The late 1760s saw the creation of a strong centralised state in Nepal. The Gurkha rulers of Nepal decided to invade southern Tibet in 1788.

The two Manchu resident agents (ambans) in Lhasa made no attempt at defence or resistance. Instead, they took the child Panchen Lama to safety when the Nepalese troops came through and plundered the rich monastery at Shigatse on their way to Lhasa. Upon hearing of the first Nepalese incursions, the Qianlong Emperor ordered troops from Sichuan to proceed to Lhasa and restore order. By the time they reached southern Tibet, the Gurkhas had already withdrawn. This counted as the first of two wars with the Gurkhas.

==== Second campaign ====
In 1791, the Gurkhas returned in force. Qianlong urgently dispatched an army of 10,000. It was made up of around 6,000 Manchu and Mongol forces supplemented by tribal soldiers under the general Fuk'anggan, with Hailancha as his deputy. They entered Tibet from Xining in the north, shortening the march but making it in the dead of winter 1791–92, crossing high mountain passes in deep snow and cold. They reached central Tibet in the summer of 1792 and within two or three months could report that they had won a decisive series of encounters that pushed the Gurkha armies. The Nepalese then successfully used stretching tactics against the Chinese army, which was 3–4 times larger. The Nepalese began pull back, making the Chinese uncomfortably overstretched. At Nuwakot, the Chinese faced a strong counterattack with Khukuri. Since Nepal was expanding to the west and Fuk'anggan was keen to protect his army, both sides signed a peace treaty at Betrawati. The peace treaty was more favourable to the Qing, as the terms forced Nepal to pay tribute to the Qing dynasty every five years.

=== Campaign in Đại Việt (1788–1789) ===
Qing invasion of Đại Việt
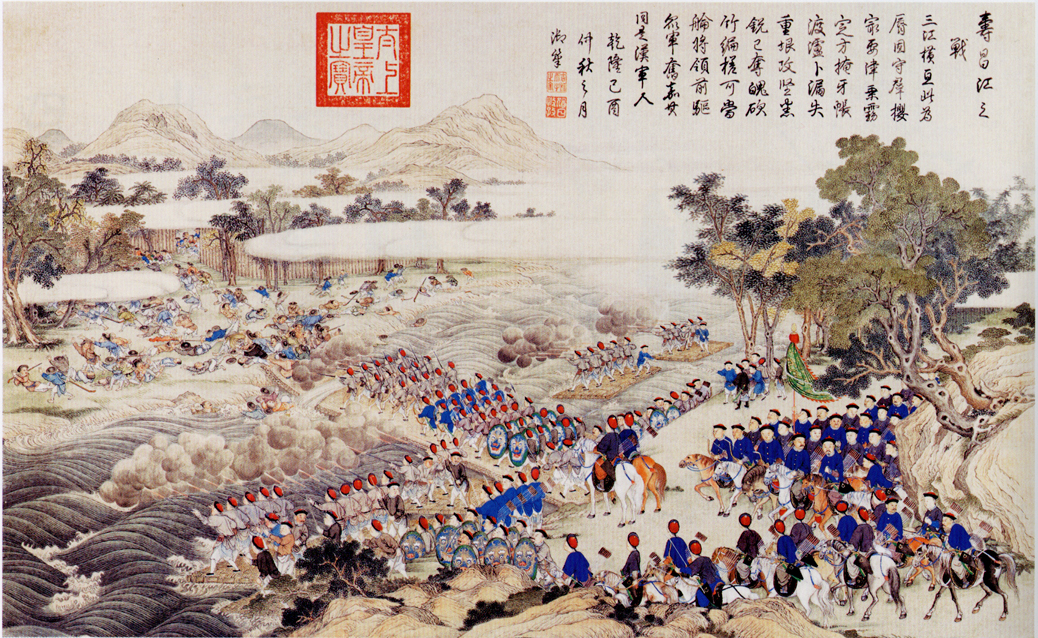
- A depiction of the Battle at the Thọ Xương river, 1788.
Date	1788–1789
Location	Northern Vietnam
Result	Tây Sơn victory: Lê dynasty ended; Qing China recognised the legitimacy of the Tây Sơn dynasty

Belligerents
Qing dynasty Lê dynasty	Tây Sơn dynasty

Commanders and leaders
Qianlong Emperor; Sun Shiyi; Xu Shiheng †; Shang Weisheng †; Zhang Chaolong †; Li Hualong †; Qingcheng; Wu Dajing; Cen Yidong †; Tang Hongye; Lê Chiêu Thống; Hoàng Phùng Nghĩa	Nguyễn Huệ; Phan Văn Lân; Ngô Văn Sở; Nguyễn Tăng Long; Đặng Xuân Bảo; Nguyễn Văn Lộc; Nguyễn Văn Tuyết; Đặng Tiến Đông; Phan Khải Đức (surrendered); Nguyễn Văn Diễm; Nguyễn Văn Hòa

Strength
20,000–200,000 Chinese troops (Note: The Chinese strength was disputed. Qing Shilu (Veritable Records of Qing) mentioned 20,000 Chinese troops. Đại Nam thực lục (Veritable Records of Đại Nam) mentioned 200,000 Chinese troops.); 20,000 Lê dynasty supporters	100,000 (50,000 regulars, 20,000 newly recruited militia)

Casualties and losses
20,000+ killed 3,400 captured	8,000+ killed

Since the 17th century, Vietnam was divided into two parts: the southern part was Đàng Trong or Cochinchina, ruled by the Nguyễn lords and the northern part was Đàng Ngoài or Tonkin, ruled by the Trịnh lords under the puppet Lê emperors. In 1771, the Tây Sơn rebellion broke out in southern Vietnam, led by the brothers Nguyễn Nhạc, Nguyễn Huệ and Nguyễn Lữ, who removed the local Nguyễn lord from power.

After the capture of Phú Xuân (modern Huế), Nguyễn Hữu Chỉnh, a traitor of Trịnh's general, encouraged Nguyễn Huệ to overthrow the Trịnh lord. Huệ took his advice, marched north and captured Đông Kinh (modern Hanoi). In 1788, Lê Chiêu Thống was installed the new Lê emperor by Huệ. Huệ then retreated to Phú Xuân.

Meanwhile, Lê Chiêu Thống never abandoned his attempt to regain the throne. Lê Quýnh, Empress Dowager Mẫn and the eldest son of Lê Chiêu Thống, fled to Longzhou, Guangxi, to seek support from Qing China. A large Qing army invaded Vietnam to restore Lê Chiêu Thống to the throne. However, the Chinese army was defeated by the Tây Sơn army and after subsequent reconciliation, Qianlong recognised Nguyễn Huệ (aka Quang Trung) as the ruler of Vietnam.

What motivated the Qing imperial government to interfere in Vietnam's domestic affairs has always been disputed. Chinese scholars claimed that the Qianlong Emperor simply wanted to restore the Lê emperor to the throne in order to end instability in Vietnam while not seeking any territorial gains. Vietnamese scholars on the other hand have argued, that Qianlong intended to make Vietnam a vassal. China would station troops in Vietnam and install Lê Chiêu Thống as its puppet king.

== In perspective ==
In his later years, the Qianlong Emperor referred to himself with the grandiose style name of "Old Man of the Ten Completed [Great Campaigns]" (十全老人). He also wrote an essay enumerating the victories in 1792, Record of Ten Completions (十全記).

However, the campaigns were a major financial drain on the Qing dynasty, costing more than 151 million silver taels. Nearly 1.5 million piculs (1 picul = 100 catties) of cargo were transported for the campaign in Taiwan.

The outcomes of the campaigns were also modest. Although the tribes at Jinchuan numbered less than 30,000 households, they took five years to pacify. The Qing campaigns in Burma, while nearly toppling the Ava regime at one point, failed to seriously destroy Burma and settled for continued tributary status from Burma and consolidated the political situation of a tripartite Mainland Southeast Asia (the three major states of Burma, Siam, and Vietnam). Instead of restoring Lê Chiêu Thống to the throne in Vietnam as the campaign had intended, the Qianlong Emperor ended up making peace with the new Tây Sơn dynasty and arranged for marriages between the imperial families of Qing and Tây Sơn.

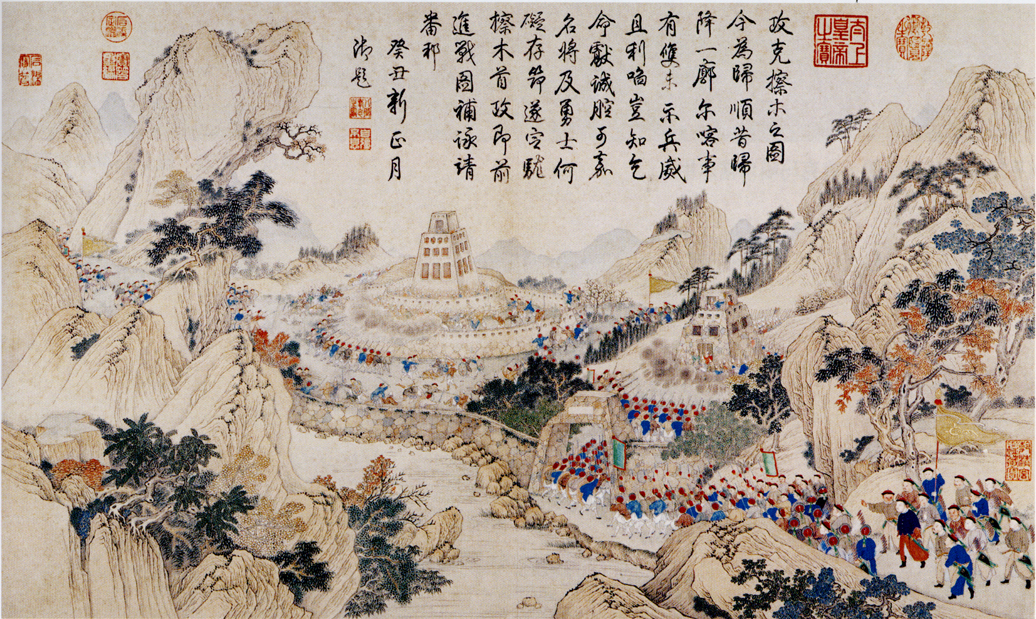
Fuk'anggan captures Camu from the Nepalese

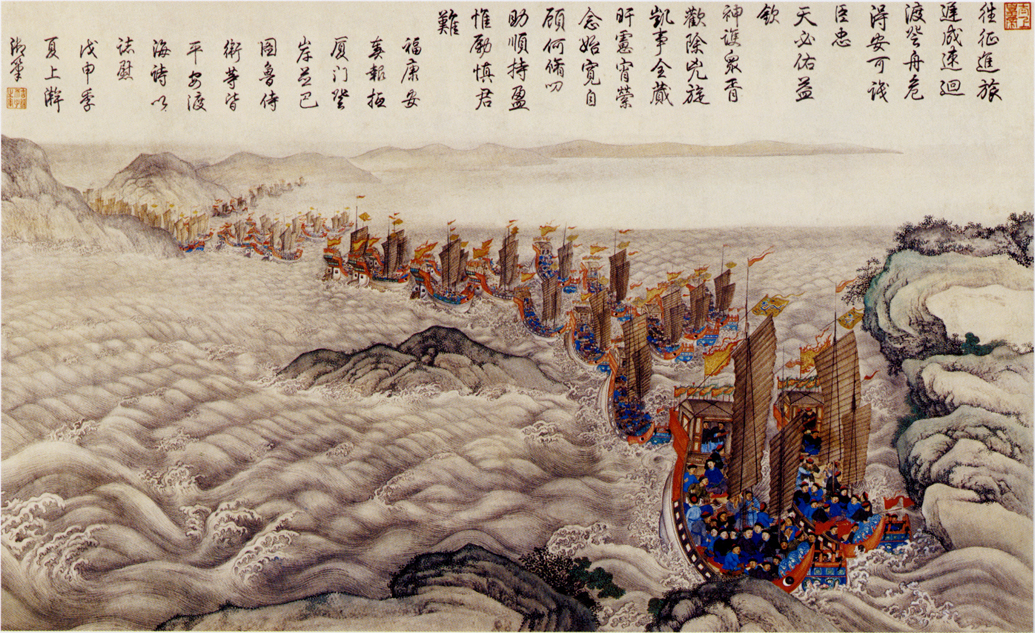
The Qing fleet returning from Taiwan

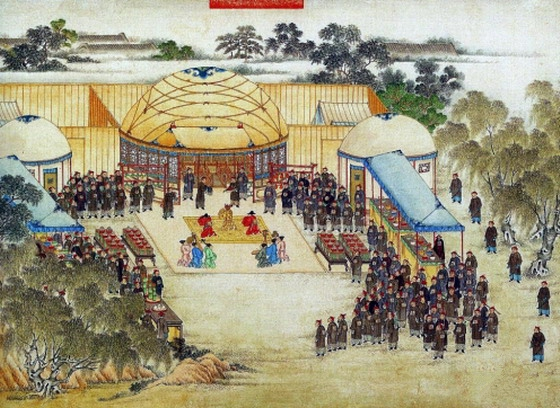
Chinese officials receiving Emperor Lê Chiêu Thống

== See also ==
- Qing dynasty in Inner Asia
- Dzungar–Qing Wars
