= Chiefdom of Chuchen =

Tibetan Tusi chiefdom (1723–1776)

Chiefdom of Chuchen ཆུ་ཆེན་
- 1723–1776
- Status: Chiefdom under the Chinese Tusi system
- Capital: Chuchen (in present day Jinchuan County)
- Common languages: Gyarung
- Government: Monarchy
- Namkha Gyalpo
  - 1723–1760: Slob Dpon (first)
  - 1760–17??: Lang Kashi
  - 17??–1776: Sonom (last)
- History
  - Established: 1723
  - Disestablished: 1776
| Succeeded by |
| Qing dynasty |
- Today part of: China

Chiefdom of Chuchen (Tibetan: ཆུ་ཆེན་, Wylie: chu chen; Chinese: 促侵土司; pinyin: Cùqīn Tǔsī), also known as Rabden or the Chiefdom of Greater Jinchuan (Chinese: 大金川土司; pinyin: Dà Jīnchuān Tǔsī; Tibetan: ཏ་གྱིན་ཆྭན་ཐུའུ་བསི), was an autonomous Gyalrong Tusi chiefdom that ruled Greater Jinchuan (present day Jinchuan County, Sichuan) during the Qing dynasty. The rulers of Chuchen used the royal title Namkha Gyalpo (Tibetan: ནམ་མཁའ་རྒྱལ་པོ, Wylie: nam mkhav rgyal po), literally "king of Namkha".

Chieftains of Chuchen had family relationship with chieftains of Tsanlha (Lesser Jinchuan). The first Chuchen chieftain was Slob Dpon, he was appointed by the Qing dynasty in 1723. Slob Dpon married a daughter to Tsewang, the chieftain of Tsanlha. Tsewang was cowardly. Slob Dpon deposed Tsewang and annexed Tsanlha in 1746; then, he invaded neighbouring chiefdoms. In 1747, the Qing dynasty launched the First Jinchuan campaign. Slob Dpon had to abdicated to his son Lang Kashi.

The Second Jinchuan campaign broke out in 1771. Two years later, chief Sonom surrendered. The Chiefdom of Chuchen was abolished, the Qing dynasty started to rule this area directly.
