= Meow Meow =

Meow Meow may refer to:

- Melissa Madden Gray, Australian cabaret performer, stage name Meow Meow
- "Meow Meow", song from the soundtrack of the 2009 Tamil film Kanthaswamy
- Mephedrone, a synthetic stimulant
- 3-Methylmethcathinone, a similar synthetic stimulant

== See also ==
- Meow (disambiguation)
