= Xiaojin County =

Xiaojin County 小金县 · བཙན་ལྷ་རྫོང་། Tsanlha, Xiaojinchuan, Maogong
- County
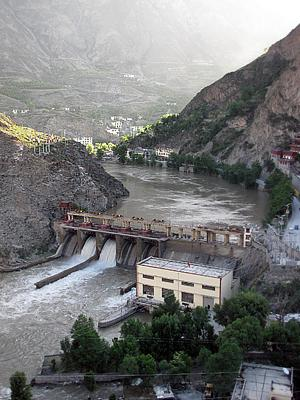
- A hydroelectric dam in Xiaojin County

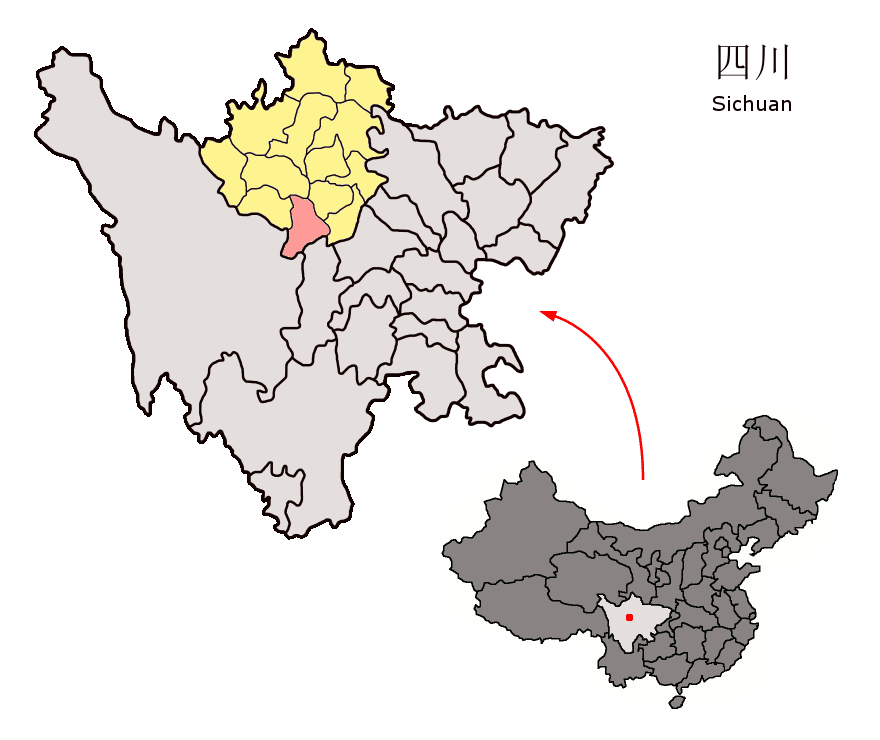
- Location of Xiaojin County (light red) in Ngawa Prefecture (yellow) and Sichuan

- Location in Sichuan Xiaojin (China)
- Coordinates: 30°59′56″N 102°21′50″E
- Country: China
- Province: Sichuan
- Autonomous prefecture: Ngawa
- Seat: Meixing (Mêxin)

Area
  - Total: 5,524 km^{2} (2,133 sq mi)

Population (2020)
  - Total: 64,813
  - Density: 11.73/km^{2} (30.39/sq mi)
- Time zone: UTC+8 (China Standard)
- Website: www.xiaojin.gov.cn

Xiaojin County

Chinese name
- Simplified Chinese: 小金县
- Traditional Chinese: 小金縣
Transcriptions
Standard Mandarin
- Hanyu Pinyin: Xiǎojīn Xiàn

Tibetan name
- Tibetan: བཙན་ལྷ་རྫོང་།
Transcriptions
- Wylie: btsan lha rdzong
- Tibetan Pinyin: Zainlha Zong

Xiaojin County (Chinese: 小金县), also known as Tsanlha from its Tibetan name (Tibetan: བཙན་ལྷ་རྫོང་།), is a county in the northwest of Sichuan Province, China. It is the southernmost county-level division of the Ngawa Tibetan and Qiang Autonomous Prefecture.

== History ==
Prior to the 18th century, Lesser Jinchuan was ruled by the Gyalrong Tibetan Chiefdom of Tsanlha. From 1747 to 1776, the Qing dynasty launched the Jinchuan campaigns to suppress the Jinchuan chiefdoms.

== Administrative divisions ==
Xiaojin County contains 7 towns and 11 townships:

Name	Simplified Chinese	Hanyu Pinyin	Tibetan	Wylie	Administrative division code
Towns
Meixing Town (Mêxin)	美兴镇	Měixīnɡ Zhèn	མེ་ཞིན་གྲོང་རྡལ།	me zhin grong rdal	513227100
Gularipo (Siguniangshan)	四姑娘山镇	Sìgūniángshān Zhèn	སྐུ་བླ་རི་བོ་གྲོང་རྡལ།	sku bla ri bo grong rdal	513227101
Qukar Town (Lianghekou)	两河口镇	Liǎnghékǒu Zhèn	ཆུ་གར་གྲོང་རྡལ།	chu gar grong rdal	513227102
Dayung Town (Dawei)	达维镇	Dáwéi Zhèn	ཏ་ཡུང་གྲོང་རྡལ།	ta yung grong rdal	513227103
Wangxing Town (Wori)	沃日镇	Wòrì Zhèn	དབང་ཞིང་གྲོང་རྡལ།	dbang zhing grong rdal	513227104
Qêlung Town (Zhailong)	宅垄镇	Zháilǒng Zhèn	ཆེ་ལུང་་གྲོང་རྡལ།	che lung grong rdal	513227106
Bajêo Town (Bajiao)	八角镇	Bājiǎo Zhèn	པ་ཅེའོ་གྲོང་རྡལ།	pa cevo grong rdal	513227107
Townships
Chongde Township (Chungdê)	崇德乡	Chóngdé Xiāng	ཁྲུང་ཏེ་ཡུལ་ཚོ།	khrung te yul tsho	513227201
Xinqiao Township (Xinqao)	新桥乡	Xīnqiáo Xiāng	ཞིན་ཆའོ་ཡུལ་ཚོ།	zhin chavo yul tsho	513227202
Meiwo Township (Mêyao)	美沃乡	Měiwò Xiāng	མེ་ཡའོ་ཡུལ་ཚོ།	me yavo yul tsho	513227203
Shalung Township (Shalong)	沙龙乡	Shālóng Xiāng	ཧྲ་ལུང་ཡུལ་ཚོ།	hra lung yul tsho	513227204
Sur Township (Ri'er)	日尔乡	Rì'ěr Xiāng	ཟུར་ཡུལ་ཚོ།	zur yul tsho	513227208
Gyomai Township (Jiesi)	结斯乡	Jiésī Xiāng	ཀྱོ་སྨད་ཡུལ་ཚོ།	kyo smad yul tsho	513227209
Mipam Township (Mupo)	木坡乡	Mùpō Xiāng	མི་ཕམ་ཡུལ་ཚོ།	mi pham yul tsho	513227211
Fubian Township (Fubên)	抚边乡	Fǔbiān Xiāng	ཧྥུ་པེན་ཡུལ་ཚོ།	hphu pen yul tsho	513227213
Ogdu Township (Wodi)	窝底乡	Wōdǐ Xiāng	འོག་ཏུ་ཡུལ་ཚོ།	vog tu yul tsho	513227216
Haxung Township (Hanniu)	汗牛乡	Hànniú Xiāng	ཧ་ཤུང་ཡུལ་ཚོ།	ha shung yul tsho	513227217
Parnga Township (Pan'an)	潘安乡	Pān'ān Xiāng	ཕར་རྔ་ཡུལ་ཚོ།	phar rnga yul tsho	513227218

== Climate ==
Climate data for Xiaojin, elevation 2,438 m (7,999 ft), (1991–2020 normals, extremes 1981–present)
Month	Jan	Feb	Mar	Apr	May	Jun	Jul	Aug	Sep	Oct	Nov	Dec	Year
Record high °C (°F)	20.8 (69.4)	25.8 (78.4)	31.5 (88.7)	32.5 (90.5)	36.3 (97.3)	35.5 (95.9)	35.5 (95.9)	35.6 (96.1)	33.8 (92.8)	30.6 (87.1)	23.5 (74.3)	18.6 (65.5)	36.3 (97.3)
Mean daily maximum °C (°F)	11.2 (52.2)	15.3 (59.5)	19.0 (66.2)	22.4 (72.3)	24.3 (75.7)	25.5 (77.9)	27.2 (81.0)	27.3 (81.1)	24.7 (76.5)	20.4 (68.7)	15.8 (60.4)	11.3 (52.3)	20.4 (68.6)
Daily mean °C (°F)	3.0 (37.4)	6.4 (43.5)	10.2 (50.4)	13.7 (56.7)	16.3 (61.3)	18.1 (64.6)	20.0 (68.0)	19.9 (67.8)	17.3 (63.1)	12.9 (55.2)	8.0 (46.4)	3.4 (38.1)	12.4 (54.4)
Mean daily minimum °C (°F)	−2.9 (26.8)	0.0 (32.0)	4.0 (39.2)	7.6 (45.7)	10.7 (51.3)	13.3 (55.9)	15.1 (59.2)	15.0 (59.0)	12.5 (54.5)	8.2 (46.8)	2.7 (36.9)	−2.1 (28.2)	7.0 (44.6)
Record low °C (°F)	−10.6 (12.9)	−7.9 (17.8)	−6.6 (20.1)	0.8 (33.4)	3.4 (38.1)	6.8 (44.2)	8.6 (47.5)	7.6 (45.7)	6.1 (43.0)	−0.2 (31.6)	−6.4 (20.5)	−10.2 (13.6)	−10.6 (12.9)
Average precipitation mm (inches)	2.0 (0.08)	6.8 (0.27)	22.4 (0.88)	55.2 (2.17)	88.7 (3.49)	136.9 (5.39)	95.2 (3.75)	74.5 (2.93)	93.6 (3.69)	55.5 (2.19)	8.4 (0.33)	1.6 (0.06)	640.8 (25.23)
Average precipitation days (≥ 0.1 mm)	2.2	3.9	9.1	14.9	18.7	22.2	17.5	15.0	17.3	14.2	4.3	1.3	140.6
Average snowy days	2.6	3.2	2.4	0	0	0	0	0	0	0	0.9	1.5	10.6
Average relative humidity (%)	39	38	42	47	53	63	63	60	63	60	49	43	52
Mean monthly sunshine hours	131.0	160.5	201.9	212.7	214.0	170.2	176.4	188.6	172.0	175.3	144.0	104.1	2,050.7
Percentage possible sunshine	41	51	54	55	50	40	41	46	47	50	46	33	46
Source: China Meteorological Administration All-time Nov Record low
