= Meowy =

Meowy may refer to:

- Holly Meowy, an American actress, TV personality, model, and professional wrestling manager
- Meowy Christmas, a 1993 album by Jingle Cats

== See also ==
- Meow (disambiguation)
