= Siguniangshan =

Siguniangshan Town
- Town

Tibetan transcription(s)
  - Tibetan: སྐུ་བླ་རི་བོ་གྲོང་རྡལ།
  - Wylie transliteration: sku bla ri bo grong rdal
  - Tibetan pinyin: Gularipo Chongdai

Chinese transcription(s)
  - Simplified: 四姑娘山镇
  - Traditional: 四姑娘山鎮
  - Pinyin: Sìgū niángshān Zhèn
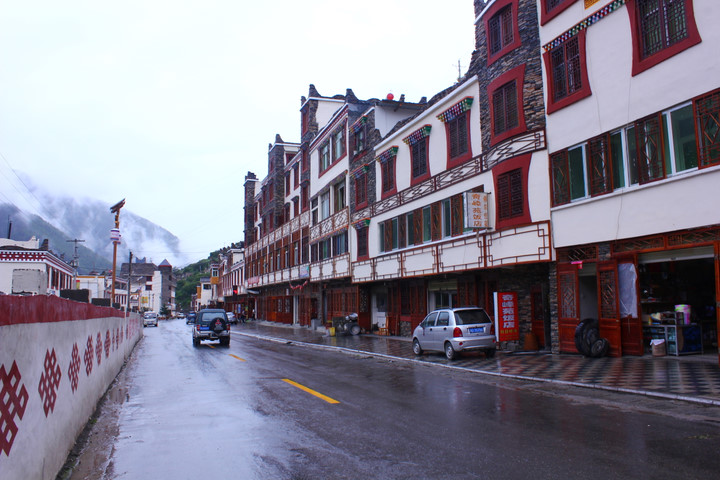

- Location in Sichuan
- Coordinates: 30°59′33″N 102°49′49″E
- Country: China
- Province: Sichuan
- Prefecture: Ngawa
- County: Xiaojin

Area
  - Total: 480 km^{2} (190 sq mi)
- Elevation: 3,160 m (10,370 ft)

Population
  - Total: 2,893
  - Density: 6.0/km^{2} (16/sq mi)
- Time zone: UTC+8 (China Standard)
- Postal code: 624207
- Area code: 0837

Siguniangshan Town (Chinese: 四姑娘山镇; pinyin: Sìgūniángshān zhèn; Tibetan: སྐུ་བླ་རི་བོ་གྲོང་རྡལ།, Wylie: sku bla ri bo grong rdal), formerly Rilong Town (Chinese: 日隆镇), is a town in Xiaojin County in the Ngawa Tibetan and Qiang Autonomous Prefecture of Sichuan, China. It is a main base for visiting Mount Siguniang. Rilong lies at roughly 3,160 meters above sea level, and the population are mainly Tibetan.

== Climate ==
Climate data for Siguniangshan Town (1991–2018 normals)
Month	Jan	Feb	Mar	Apr	May	Jun	Jul	Aug	Sep	Oct	Nov	Dec	Year
Mean daily maximum °C (°F)	1.5 (34.7)	4.1 (39.4)	6.7 (44.1)	9.8 (49.6)	12.7 (54.9)	14.3 (57.7)	16.6 (61.9)	16.6 (61.9)	13.7 (56.7)	9.1 (48.4)	5.7 (42.3)	2.4 (36.3)	9.4 (49.0)
Daily mean °C (°F)	−5.5 (22.1)	−3.0 (26.6)	0.1 (32.2)	3.7 (38.7)	6.9 (44.4)	9.3 (48.7)	11.5 (52.7)	11.1 (52.0)	8.5 (47.3)	4.0 (39.2)	−0.6 (30.9)	−4.0 (24.8)	3.5 (38.3)
Mean daily minimum °C (°F)	−12.4 (9.7)	−9.8 (14.4)	−6.2 (20.8)	−2.2 (28.0)	1.2 (34.2)	4.3 (39.7)	6.2 (43.2)	5.3 (41.5)	3.0 (37.4)	−1.4 (29.5)	−6.5 (20.3)	−11.2 (11.8)	−2.5 (27.5)
Average precipitation mm (inches)	3.4 (0.13)	6.2 (0.24)	22.4 (0.88)	52.4 (2.06)	100.9 (3.97)	140.1 (5.52)	115.6 (4.55)	97.8 (3.85)	113.3 (4.46)	57.4 (2.26)	11.4 (0.45)	2.0 (0.08)	722.9 (28.45)
Source: Baidu

== See also ==
- List of township-level divisions of Sichuan
