= Cat's meow =

Cat's meow may refer to:

- Meow (occasionally spelled miaow, miaou, etc.), an onomatopoeia for the voiced sound made by cats (Felis silvestris catus)
- "The cat's meow," an expression referring to something that is considered outstanding; coined by American cartoonist Thomas A. Dorgan (1877–1929)
- The Cat's Meow (1924 film), a 1924 lost silent short film starring Harry Langdon
- The Kat's Meow, a 1930 Krazy Kat animated film
- "The Cat's Meow", a 1966 episode of Batman TV series
- "The Cat's Meow", a 1986 episode of Mama's Family TV series
- The Cat's Meow, a 1987 painting by Willem de Kooning
- The Cat's Meow, a 2001 film
- The Cat's Miaow, an Australian band

== See also ==
- Meow (disambiguation)
- Purr, a different cat sound
- Cat body language
