= .meow =

Proposed generic top-level domain

.meow is a proposed generic top-level domain. The domain's application to ICANN is currently in the pre-evaluation stage. The domain is a project pursued by the dotMeow Foundation, a non-profit based in Belgium whose intention is to create a domain for use by the queer community.

The domain is intended to have stricter privacy and security requirements than other gTLDs, intending to collect only the absolute minimum of data from users and only sharing that data when absolutely necessary. To ensure privacy on all levels, the foundation intends to act as its own registry service provider in the future.

== History ==
The foundation raised €121,896 through a crowdfunding campaign on Kickstarter. The foundation submitted the application to ICANN in August of 2026. The team made use of ICANN's Applicant Support Program to reduce the necessary application fee by 75%. The Foundation has decided to use CORE as it's registry service provider.
