= Zhaohui =

Manchu Chinese politician and Military general

First Class Duke Wuyi Mouyong Zhaohui
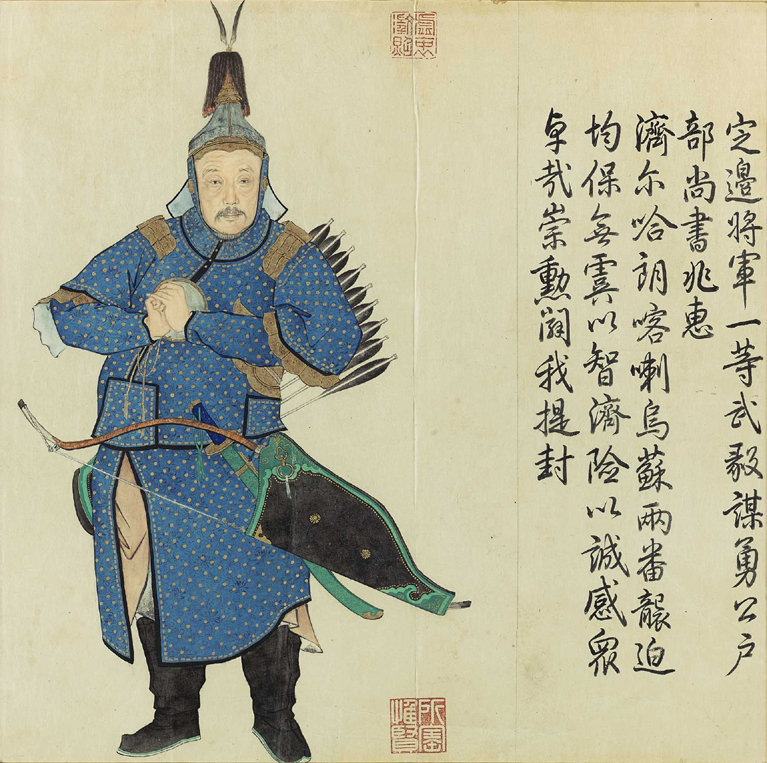

Assistant Grand Secretary
- In office 10 May 1761 – 10 December 1764

Grand Councillor
- In office 18 April 1750 – 3 November 1754

Minister of Revenue
- In office 14 May 1757 – 10 December 1764
- Preceded by: Arigūn
- Succeeded by: Arigūn

Personal details
- Born: 1708 Ganxian, Ganzhou, China
- Died: 10 December 1764 (aged 55–56) Beijing, China
- Relations: Princess Heke (daughter-in-law)
- Children: Jalantai (son)
- Occupation: politician, general
- Clan name: Uya
- Courtesy name: Hefu (和甫)
- Posthumous name: Wenxiang (文襄)

Military service
- Allegiance: Qing dynasty
- Branch/service: Manchu Plain Yellow Banner
- Rank: General
- Battles/wars: Dzungar–Qing War; Amursana rebellion First Sino–Kazakh War; Revolt of the Altishahr Khojas

Zhaohui (Chinese: 兆惠, Manchu: ᠵᠠᠣᡥᡡᡳ, 1708 – 10 December 1764) was a Qing dynasty general and Grand Secretary who was prominent in the conquest of what is now Xinjiang. He served under the Qianlong Emperor and was a member of the Plain Yellow Banner.
