= Trokyap =

Gyalrong Tibetan kingdom (abolished 1952)

Chiefdom of Trokyap ཁྲོ་སྐྱབས།
- 1700–1952
- Status: Chiefdom under the Chinese Tusi system
- Capital: Trokyap (in present day Guanyinqiao, Jinchuan County, Ngawa Prefecture, Sichuan)
- Common languages: Khroskyabs
- Religion: Bon
- Government: Monarchy
- Trokyapo
- History
  - Established: 1700
  - Disestablished: 1952
| Succeeded by |
| China |
- Today part of: China

Trokyap (Tibetan: ཁྲོ་སྐྱབས།, Wylie: khro skyabs, Chinese: 绰斯甲土司) or Chuosi was a Gyalrong Tibetan kingdom located in today's southern Zamthang County and north of Jinchuan County of Ngawa Tibetan and Qiang Autonomous Prefecture in western Sichuan Province of China. It was one of the 18 Gyalrong kingdoms. In 1700, it submitted to Qing rule and its leader, Solang Luobu, received the title "Pacification Commissioner" (Anfusi, 安抚司). It regained autonomy after the Xinhai Revolution in 1912. In the late 1930s, the nationalist Kuomintang government placed it under Xikang jurisdiction. The kingdom was abolished by the Chinese Government in 1952. Trokyap was a major supporter of the Bon religion in the area, alongside the Dajinchuan Tusi.

According to local folklore, long ago a god and a nymph gave birth to a flower egg, and the son hatched from the egg came to the Chuosjia area and became king. Huadan's son had three sons with the locals: the eldest became the ancestor of the Trokyap ruler, the second the ancestor of the Wori chieftain, and the second the ancestor of the Geshizan chieftain.

Trokyap still existed during the Republic of China period. In 1950, Li Fuxi, commander of the 134th Division of the Nationalist Army under Hu Zongnan, was defeated by the PLA and fled to Chuosijia, where he was received by the last Tusi Najian Zan (Sige Rongjia Mu Can). That same year, Zhou Xunyu, director of the Chengdu Inspection Office of the Central Bureau, fled to Ruchuosijia and appointed Najian Zan as the "Commander of the Column Directly Under the Headquarters of the Chuan-Kang Border Region People's Anti-Communist National Salvation Army." In early 1951, Najinzan sent the second-in-command Guo Fengchun (Elaja Zekesheng) and Red Army soldier Li Chunfang, who had been scattered in Chuosijia during the Long March, to go to western Sichuan to welcome the People's Liberation Army stationed in Chuosijia. In 1953, Nagyaltsen was elected director of the Chuosjia Executive Committee. During the land reform movement, Nagyan Tsan announced in September 1954 that the burden of 'official grain' on the Tusi would be reduced and exempted. In July 1955, he agreed to the decision of the Chuosijia Working Committee of the Communist Party to abolish the grain ration system for chieftains, voluntarily relinquishing the Tusi position, marking the end of Trokyap.
