= Miao =

Miao may refer to:

- Miao people, linguistically and culturally related group of people, recognized as such by the government of the People's Republic of China
- Miao script or Pollard script, writing system used for Miao languages
- Miao (Unicode block), a block of Unicode characters of the Pollard script
- Miao shrine (庙), a type of Chinese temple
- Miáo (surname), a Chinese surname written 苗
- Miào (surname), a Chinese surname written 繆
- Miao, Chongming County (庙镇), town in Chongming District, Shanghai, China
- Miao, Arunachal Pradesh, town in India
- Roman Catholic Diocese of Miao, in India
- "Mr. Miao", a short story by Pu Songling
- Miao..., 1998 album by Candy Lo

== See also ==
- Miao Rebellion (disambiguation)
- Miao Miao, Australian table tennis player
- Meow (disambiguation)
- Meo (disambiguation)
