= Histoire des Miao =

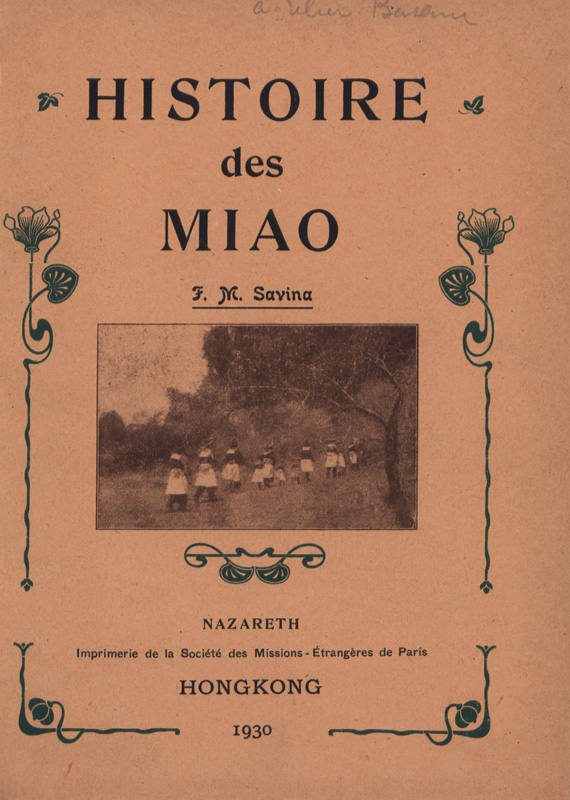
- Author: Francois Marie Savina
- Publication date: 1924

Histoire des Miao ("History of the Miao") is a 1924 ethnographic book of the Hmong people by François Marie Savina, published by the Société des Missions-Etrangères de Paris. As of 2006, of Savina's writings, it is the most well-known and the most often cited. The book includes Savina's theories and views of the Hmong. Savina argued that the Hmong had non-Asian origins because their legends had similarities to European stories.

Jean Michaud, author of Historical Dictionary of the Peoples of the Southeast Asian Massif, described the book as "highly original yet controversial work of applied ethnography and largely conjectural history". Mark Pfeifer of the Hmong Cultural and Resource Center wrote that the book is "Not supported by any available empirical evidence, not given credence by contemporary scholars". A statement Michaud, in a biography of Savina included to his 'Incidental' Ethnographers. French Catholic Missions on the Tonkin-Yunnan Frontier, 1880-1930, contributes to refine by showing the staggering extent of Savina's field experience and proficiency in several vernacular languages, including Hmong/Miao. Analyzing critically Histoire des Miao (pp. 186–203), Michaud shows that it is not so much Savina's ethnography that is lacking, but his critical sense as visible in unwarranted historical assumptions rendered partial by his Catholic faith.
