= Gyalrong people =

Gyalrong
Total population
- 120,000

Regions with significant populations
- Sichuan, China

Languages
- Gyalrongic (traditional), Amdo Tibetan, Khams Tibetan, Sichuanese, Mandarin Chinese (lingua franca)

Religion
- Tibetan Buddhism

Related ethnic groups
- Tibetan, Qiang, Tangut

Gyalrong (Chinese: 嘉绒; Tibetan: རྒྱལ་རོང) people, also called rGyalrong, Jiarong, or Gyarong, are ethnically native to parts of the Ngawa Tibetan and Qiang Autonomous Prefecture and the Garzê Tibetan Autonomous Prefecture of Sichuan, China. They speak a variety of languages. Gyalrong is an exo-ethnonym and loanword from Tibetan, namely rGyal-mo tsha-wa rong. Gyalrongs refer to themselves as Keru.

During the Ming and Qing dynasties, Gyalrong were ruled by local chieftains (Tusi). In 1746, Lopön (tib. slob dpon), the chieftain of Greater Jinchuan, was trying to unite tribes in Sichuan, forcing the Qing dynasty to launch campaigns to suppress them. The People's Republic of China subsequently lumped them together with Tibetans. Due to the intermixing of ethnicities, it is difficult to accurately count the Gyalrong people, but they probably number in the hundreds of thousands.

The dominant religion of Gyalrong was once Bon, but in the early 15th century the region received missionaries from central Tibet teaching the doctrine of the Gelug order of Tibetan Buddhism. Despite strenuous opposition from Bon priests, the Gelugpa succeeded in building many large monasteries in Gyalrong such as the Dhe-Tsang Monastery.

== Etymology ==
The name Gyalmo Rong (rgyal mo rong) can be translated as "valley of the queen", which hints at the region having been ruled by women.

== Language ==
Gyalrong people speak a variety of languages, including Qiangic Gyalrongic languages, Amdo Tibetan, Khams Tibetan, and Sichuan Chinese.

== Gyalrong region ==
The wider Gyalrong region encompasses neighboring places inhabited by Amdo and Kham Tibetans, Han Chinese, and the Qiang people. It contains a 120-mile long river basin at its core as well as steep, forested mountains and river valleys. Mount Murdo (dmu rdo) (4820 m) is a prominent destination for Bön and Buddhist pilgrims. Small and large rivers flow through the region from north to south and are known by many names. Historical Gyalrong kingdoms and current administrative divisions overlap with parts of Kham and Amdo.

The 18 Gyalrong kingdoms/chiefdoms (嘉绒十八土司) in this area were:

- Kingdom of Chakla (ལྕགས་ལ། Wylie: lcags la; Chinese: 明正土司)
- Chiefdom of Rapten/Chuchen (ཆུ་ཆེན། Wylie: chu chen, Chinese: 祈浸土司) aka Greater Jinchuan
- Chiefdom of Tsanlha (བཙན་ལྷ། Wylie: btsan lha, Chinese: 赞拉土司) aka Lesser Jinchuan
- Chiefdom of Trokyap (ཁྲོ་སྐྱབས་། Wylie: khro skyabs, Chinese: 绰斯甲土司)
- Chiefdom of Guthang (འགུ་ཐང་། Wylie: vgu thang, Chinese: 鱼通土司)
- Chiefdom of Gomai Damkala (མགོ་སྨད་དམ་ཀ་ལ། Wylie: mgo smad dam ka la, Chinese: 天全六番土司)
- Chiefdom of Gotod (མགོ་སྟོད། Wylie: mgo stod; Chinese: 冷边土司)
- Chiefdom of Trateng (བྲག་སྟེང་། Wylie: brag steng, Chinese: 巴底土司)
- Chiefdom of Bawam (པ་ཝམ། Wylie: pa wam, Chinese: 巴旺土司)
- Chiefdom of Geshitsa (དགེ་ཤིས་ཙ། Wylie: dge shis tsa, Chinese: 革什咱土司)
- Chiefdom of Gyalkha (རྒྱལ་ཁ། : Wylie: rgyal kha, Chinese: 杂谷脑土司)
- Chiefdom of Ogshi (འོག་གཞི། Wylie: vog gzhi, Chinese: 沃日土司)
- Chiefdom of Lunggu (Wylie: lung dgu) in what is today Wenchuan County
- Chiefdom of Muchi (མུ་ཕྱི།Wylie: mu phyi, Chinese: 穆坪土司)
- Chiefdom of Somang (སོ་མང་། Wylie: so mang, Chinese: 梭磨土司)
- Chiefdom of Jotse (ཅོག་ཙེ། Wylie: cog tse, Chinese: 卓克基土司)
- Chiefdom of Dzonggag (རྫོང་འགག Wylie: rdzong vgag, Chinese: 松岗土司)
- Chiefdom of Tsenpa (བསྟན་པ། Wylie: bstan pa, Chinese: 党坝土司)

Current administrative divisions that fall within eastern and southeastern parts of Ganzi Prefecture include Dartsendo, Tau, Nyakchukha, and Rongdrak, Chakzam (lcag zam, Luding) and Gyezur counties. Places in southern and eastern parts of Ngawa Prefecture include Rapten/Chuchen, Tsenlha, and Barkham counties, as well as parts of Lunggu/Tritsang, Trashiling (bkra shis gling, Li), and Trochu (khro chu, Heishui) counties. Chakzam has become heavily sinified, and Gyezur is now viewed more as a part of Kham.

== Notable Gyalrongwas ==
- Alan Dawa Dolma (born 1987), singer
- Sanggyai Yexe (1917–2008), communist official
- Sonom (died 1776), chieftain of the Gyalrong

== See also ==
- Quanrong
- Zhang Zhung
