= Kingdom of Chakla =

1407–1950 Tibetan kingdom in Kham

Kingdom of Chakla ལྕགས་ལ་
- 1407–1950
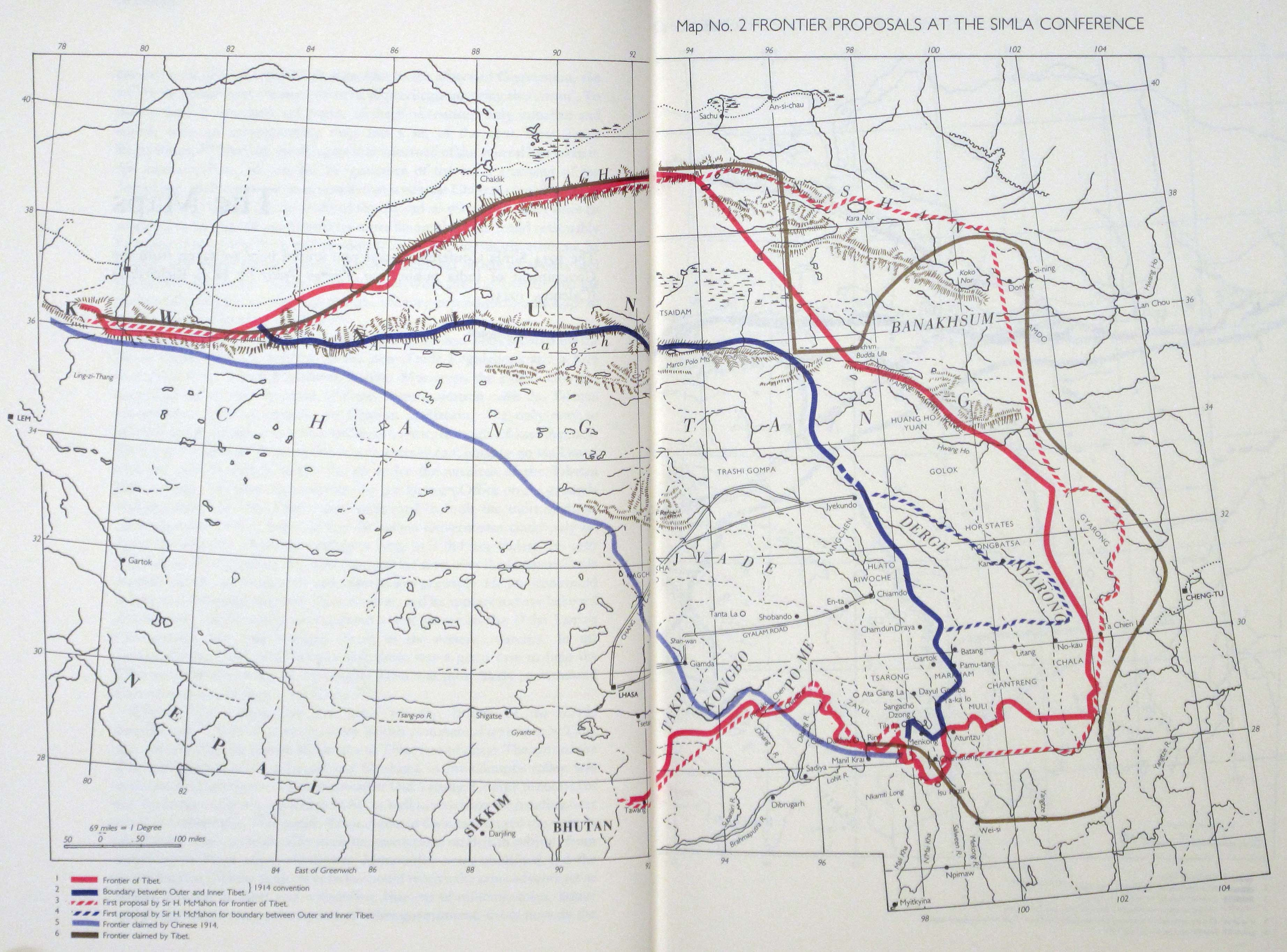
- Chala marked at the southeastern corner of Tibet (red boundary) (Note: Map from the 1914 Simla Convention: red line showing the frontier of Tibet as per the Convention and the blue line showing the boundary between the autonomous 'Outer Tibet' and the 'Inner Tibet' designated for Chinese administration.)
- Capital: Dartsedo (present day Kangding); 29.999°N 101.957°E
- Common languages: rGyalrong languages (including Muya, Zhaba, Choyo)
- History
  - Established: 1407
  - Disestablished: 1950
Succeeded by
China
- Today part of: China

Kingdom of Chakla (Tibetan: ལྕགས་ལ་, Wylie: lcags la, THL: chakla; Chinese: 明正土司; pinyin: Míngzhēng tǔsī) or Chala was a kingdom in the Tibetan region of Kham.

Chakla along with Bathang, Lithang, and Derge were called the "Four Great Native Chiefdoms in Kham" (康區四大土司). During the Qing dynasty it was a Tusi under the umbrella of the Qing Empire.

The kingdom was located in the eponymous Chakla region, near the historical border between Tibet and China proper. By the late 1200s, it had been founded around the city of Dartsedo, now known as Kangding. Due to its position, the town formed a trading centre for merchants from Tibet and China proper, who traded goods such as tea, traditional medicines, horses, and paper; for this reason the Ganden Phodrang government established a taxation regime in the kingdom, headed by a commissioner. The local kings resented the taxation coming from Lhasa, resulting in a rebellion in 1666, backed up by Chakla allying with the emerging Qing dynasty. Ganden Phodrang forces invaded five years later, followed by the murder of the king of Chakla by the commissioner in 1699. However, a year later, the commissioner was killed himself by Qing forces, who reorganised their Tibetan provinces in 1725, removing Chakla from Ganden Phodrang rule.

The Kingdom of Chakla was annexed by Qing dynasty in 1911; Zhao Erfeng forced the king to abdicate. However, ruler of Chakla had high prestige in Xikang and the Republican Chinese government had to allow them to restore him. Finally, the kingdom was annexed by the People's Republic of China in 1950.
