= Chinese expedition to Tibet (1910) =

Military expedition into Tibet by the Qing dynasty

Date	1910
Location	Tibet
Result	Qing victory

Belligerents
Qing dynasty	Tibet; Thirty-nine Hor tribes Kingdom of Powo

Commanders and leaders
(Qing dynasty) Lian Yu (Qing dynasty) Zhong Ying	13th Dalai Lama; Kelsang Gyaltsen; Tsarong Dazang Dramdul

The Chinese expedition to Tibet of 1910 resulted from Qing worries about its national interests after a 1903 British expedition. Qing China sent a military force of 2,000 troops to Tibet, then its protectorate, to increase its authority in the region. This led to turmoil in Tibet, causing the Dalai Lama to flee to British India and a rupture in Sino-Tibetan relations.

== Background ==
Since the early 18th century, Tibet was a self-governing protectorate under Qing China. From then till the end of the 19th century, Tibet did not have an adult Dalai Lama and China played an increasing role in the internal governance of Tibet. China placed resident officials called ambans in Tibet who supervised the local administration. (Note: There were two ambans, one consider the chief amban and the other the assistant.)

With the coming to age of the 13th Dalai Lama, the Tibetans started asserting their autonomy. They also expected to be consulted on all aspects of external affairs conducted by China on Tibet's behalf. The treaties signed with the British Empire in India regarding Tibet's border or trade relations were not recognised by the Tibetan officials, claiming that agreements signed without consultation were invalid. Sensing a power vacuum in Tibet, the British sent an expedition to Tibet in 1904, led by Francis Younghusband, and signed their own treaty with Tibet. The Dalai Lama fled Lhasa before the arrival of the expedition, wanting to avoid the signing of the agreement.

However, the British allowed China to salvage the situation. They loosened the terms of the Anglo-Tibetan treaty, allowing China to pay the war indemnity on Tibet's behalf in a shorter time frame, and giving recognition to China's authority over Tibet in a separate treaty with China. They also signed a bilateral treaty with Russia in which Chinese suzerainty over Tibet was explicitly recognised. The Chinese negotiators continued to maintain that China possessed sovereignty over Tibet, not merely suzerainty.

=== Reforms in Lhasa ===
The international developments caused a reduction in the status of Tibet and increased the assertion of power by China. The Dalai Lama, who left Lhasa in the wake of Younghusband expedition, spent time Buddhist monasteries in Amdo and Mongolia, and eventually went to Beijing to see the Chinese emperor, where he received an inferior treatment as a subordinate. During his absence, China implemented a variety of measures to increase its control over Tibet. Zhang Yintang, an official sent to negotiate with the British government in India, was appointed as the Imperial High Commissioner in Tibet. He introduced a variety of "new deal" reforms in the administration, vastly curtailed the British influence in Tibet, and managed to win over sections of Tibetan population. The amban, Lianyu, had his own reforms to implement, which were said to be considerably less popular. The tensions between them caused Zhang to leave in June 1907. After his departure, Lian Yu had an unobstructed run on the administration of Tibet.

=== Reforms in Kham ===
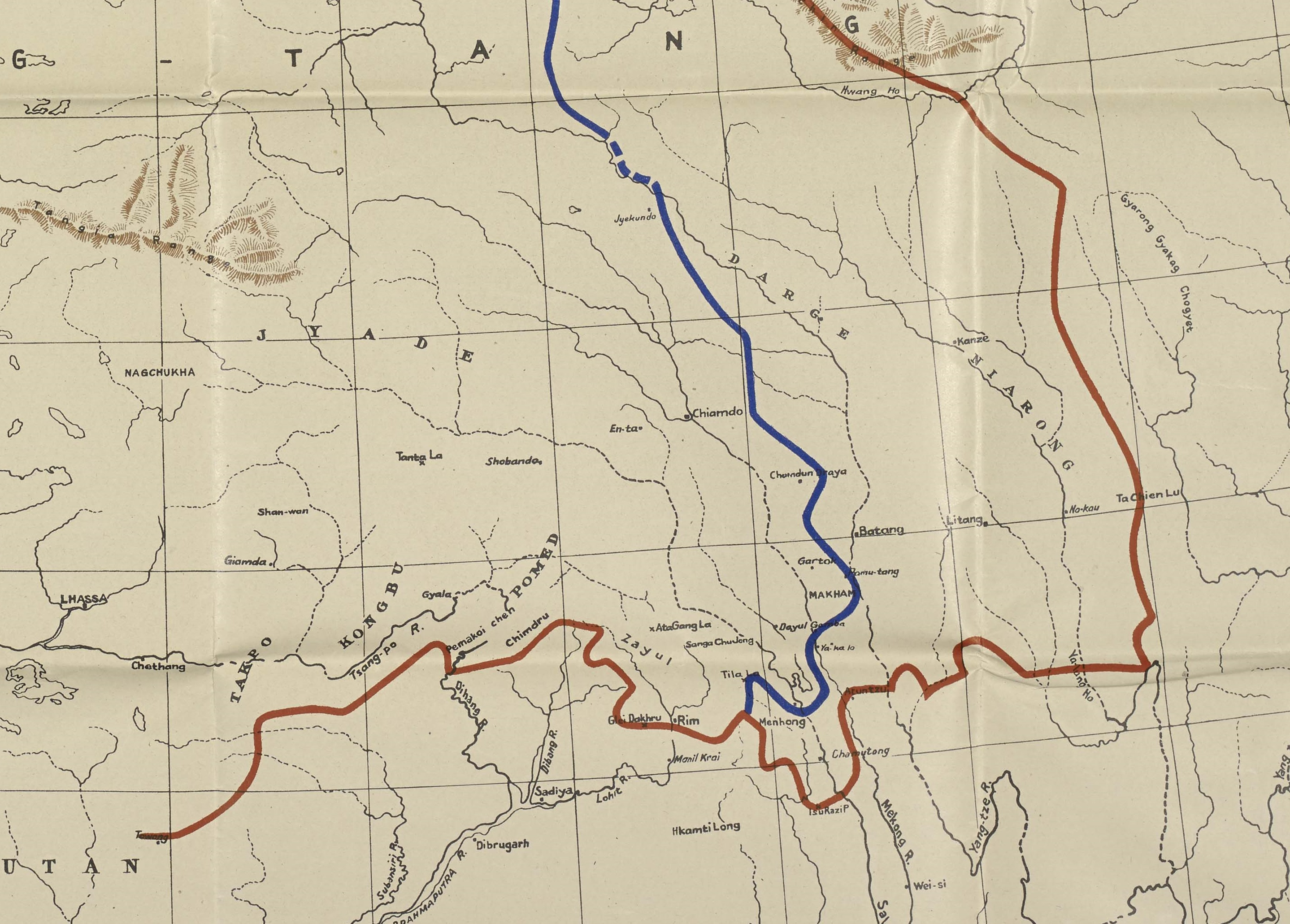
Border between western and eastern Kham shown as the dark blue line (Simla Convention, 1914)

Concurrently, China was also beginning to exercise increased control over eastern Kham region, which had been nominally under its control since 1728. (Note: Tibetologist Melvyn Goldstein states: "In 1728 three large ethnic Tibetan areas in Kham were placed under the jurisdiction of Sichuan and three others under the jurisdiction of Yunnan province.") China's route to Tibet passed through the region, giving rise to its nickname "march country" (through which the Chinese troops would need to march en route to Tibet). In 1903, the Chinese officials in Sichuan decided to develop agriculture and mining in the area and used the Younghusband expedition to provide a renewed sense of urgency to the plan. The objective was to strengthen Chinese state control in the frontier area.

The Qing court approved the plan in March 1904 and ordered the newly appointed assistant amban of Tibet, Feng Quan, to take his station at Chamdo. (Note: Chamdo is in western Kham under Lhasa's control. So theoretically, the new amban would be in Tibetan territory but would be able to look after the frontier affairs. The previous assistant amban Gui Lin declined to take up the task citing health reasons, leading to the appointment of Feng Quan.) Feng Quan decided to attempt the project at Batang (in eastern Kham, en route to Chamdo) and, within a hundred days, provoked the Batang uprising, in which he was murdered. The Qing court then appointed a new official Zhao Erfeng ("butcher Zhao"), who was already known for his tough methods, as the Imperial Commissioner for the Tibetan Marches. Zhao reduced all the autonomous native states in both the western and eastern Kham by 1910 and converted them into Chinese districts governed by magistrates. He signed an agreement with the Central Tibetan government setting the border between China and Tibet at Gyamda.

== Expedition ==
The Qing Government sent the 1910 expedition to Tibet to establish direct administration. According to scholar Dawa Norbu, the British expedition and Treaty of Lhasa prompted the Qing government to ensure that they could establish firmer control over Tibet. Afterwards, the Dalai Lama fled to India. Melvyn Goldstein, an American Tibetologist, writes that losing Tibet to British influence would also make Sichuan province more exposed. The Qing dynasty collapsed following the 1911 Revolution, and its forces withdrew from Tibet.

== See also ==
- Tibet under Qing rule
- Xinhai Lhasa turmoil
- Chinese expedition to Tibet (1720)
- Batang uprising
- Zhao Erfeng
- Tibet (1912–1951)

== Bibliography ==
- Chung, Chien-peng (2018). "Comparing China's frontier politics: how much difference did a century make?". Nationalities Papers. 46 (1): 158–176. doi:10.1080/00905992.2017.1350151.
- Coleman, William M. (2014), Making the State on the Sino-Tibetan Frontier: Chinese Expansion and Local Power in Batang, 1842-1939, Columbia University (PhD thesis)
- Goldstein, Melvyn C. (1989), A History of Modern Tibet, 1913-1951: The Demise of the Lamaist State, University of California Press, ISBN 978-0-520-91176-5
- Goldstein, Melvyn C. (1997), The Snow Lion and the Dragon: China, Tibet, and the Dalai Lama, University of California Press, ISBN 978-0-520-21951-9
- Ho, Dahpon David (April 2008), "The Men Who Would Not Be Amban and the One Who Would", Modern China, 34 (2): 210–246, doi:10.1177/0097700407312856
- Lamb, Alastair (1966), The McMahon Line: A Study in the Relations Between, India, China and Tibet, 1904 to 1914, Vol. 1: Morley, Minto and Non-Interference in Tibet, Routledge & K. Paul – via archive.org
- Lamb, Alastair (1989), Tibet, China & India, 1914-1950: a history of imperial diplomacy, Roxford Books, ISBN 978-0-907129-03-5
- McGranahan, Carole (Winter 2003), "From Simla to Rongbatsa: The British and the "Modern" Boundaries of Tibet", The Tibet Journal, 28 (4): 39–60, JSTOR 43302541
- Mehra, Parshotam (1974). The McMahon Line and After: A Study of the Triangular Contest on India's North-eastern Frontier Between Britain, China and Tibet, 1904-47. Macmillan. ISBN 9780333157374 – via archive.org.
- Mehra, Parshotam (1990), "The Elusive Triangle: Tibet in India-China Relations—A Brief Conspectus", China Report, 26 (2): 145–156, doi:10.1177/000944559002600202
- Norbu, Dawa (2001), China's Tibet Policy, Routledge, ISBN 978-1-136-79793-4
- Smith, Warren (1996), Tibetan Nation: A History Of Tibetan Nationalism And Sino-Tibetan Relations, Avalon Publishing, ISBN 978-0-8133-3155-3
  - Smith, Warren (2019), Tibetan Nation: A history of Tibetan nationalism and Sino-Tibetan relations, Taylor & Francis, ISBN 978-1-00-061228-8
- Van Praag, Michael C. Van Walt (1987), The Status of Tibet: History, Rights, And Prospects in International Law, Avalon Publishing, ISBN 978-0-8133-0394-9
