= Chiefdom of Lithang =

Tibetan Tusi chiefdom (1719–1906)

Chiefdom of Lithang ལི་ཐང་
- 1719–1906
- Status: Chiefdom under the Chinese Tusi system
- Capital: Lithang
- Common languages: Khams Tibetan
- chieftain
  - 1719–17??: Le An Bang (first)
  - 18??–1906: Sonam Dradul (last)
- vice chieftain
  - 1719-17??: Chokyi Gyatso (first)
  - 18??-1906: Atra (last)
- History
  - Established: 1719
  - Disestablished: 1906
Preceded by	Succeeded by
Khoshut Khanate	Qing dynasty
- Today part of: China

Chiefdom of Lithang (Tibetan: ལི་ཐང་, Wylie: li thang), or Chiefdom of Litang (Chinese: 理塘土司), was an autonomous Tusi chiefdom that ruled Litang (present day Litang County of Garzê Tibetan Autonomous Prefecture) during the Qing dynasty period. Lithang, Bathang, Chakla and Derge were called the "Four Great Native Chiefdoms in Kham" (康区四大土司) by the Chinese.

At first Lithang was ruled by the Khoshut Khanate. Lamas of Lithang Monastery were appointed the desi (governor) to govern the region. In 1719, a Chinese army under Yue Zhongqi marched to conquer Tibet, and the Lithang Lama surrendered to the Chinese. The 7th Dalai Lama's stepfather was appointed chieftain by China; Lithang Lama was appointed the vice chieftain. In 1725, Lithang was separated from Tibet. From then on, it was under the jurisdiction of Sichuan.

Lithang revolted against Qing China in 1905. However, the rebellion was soon put down by Zhao Erfeng.
