= Chiefdom of Bathang =

Tibetan Tusi chiefdom (1719–1906)

Chiefdom of Bathang འབའ་ཐང
- 1719–1906
- Status: Chiefdom under the Chinese Tusi system
- Capital: Bathang
- Common languages: Khams Tibetan
- chieftain
  - 1719–17??: Norbu Ngawang (first)
  - 18??–1906: Tashi Gyaltsen (last)
- vice chieftain
  - 1719-17??: Tashi Tsering (first)
  - 18??-1906: Drakpa Gyaltsen (last)
- History
  - Established: 1719
  - Disestablished: 1906
Preceded by	Succeeded by
Khoshut Khanate	Qing dynasty
- Today part of: China

Chiefdom of Bathang (Tibetan: འབའ་ཐང་, Wylie: vbav thang), or Chiefdom of Batang (Chinese: 巴塘土司), was an autonomous Tusi chiefdom that ruled Bathang (present day Batang County of Garzê Tibetan Autonomous Prefecture) during the Qing dynasty period.

Bathang belonged to the Chiefdom of Lijiang during the Ming dynasty period. Later, it was occupied by the Khoshut Khanate. In 1703, Lha-bzang Khan appointed two desi to govern the region. In 1719, a Chinese army under Yue Zhongqi marched to conquer Tibet, and the two desi surrendered to the Chinese. They were appointed chieftain and vice chieftain by the Chinese respectively.

Bathang, Lithang, Chakla and Derge were called the "Four Great Native Chiefdoms in Kham" (康区四大土司) by the Chinese. In 1725, Bathang was separated from Tibet. From then on, it was under the jurisdiction of Sichuan. Bathang chieftains were appointed by Chinese emperors directly.

Under the inspiration of Guangxu's expansion policy, many Chinese migrated to Kham. It irritated the local Tibetans. In 1905, Bathang murdered a Chinese official Fengquan (鳳全). Then Bathang revolted against Qing China. The rebellion was put down by Zhao Erfeng in the same year. The last chieftain and vice chieftain were captured by Zhao, and tortured to death. Bathang was annexed by China in the next year.
