= Dege =

Dege may refer to:

- Derge, a town in Dêgê County in Garzê Tibetan Autonomous Prefecture, Sichuan, China
- Dêgê County, in Garzê Tibetan Autonomous Prefecture, Sichuan, China
- Dege Kingdom, a former kingdom in Eastern Tibet
