= Tusi =

Indigenous chieftain regimes of China during Yuan, Ming and Qing dynasties

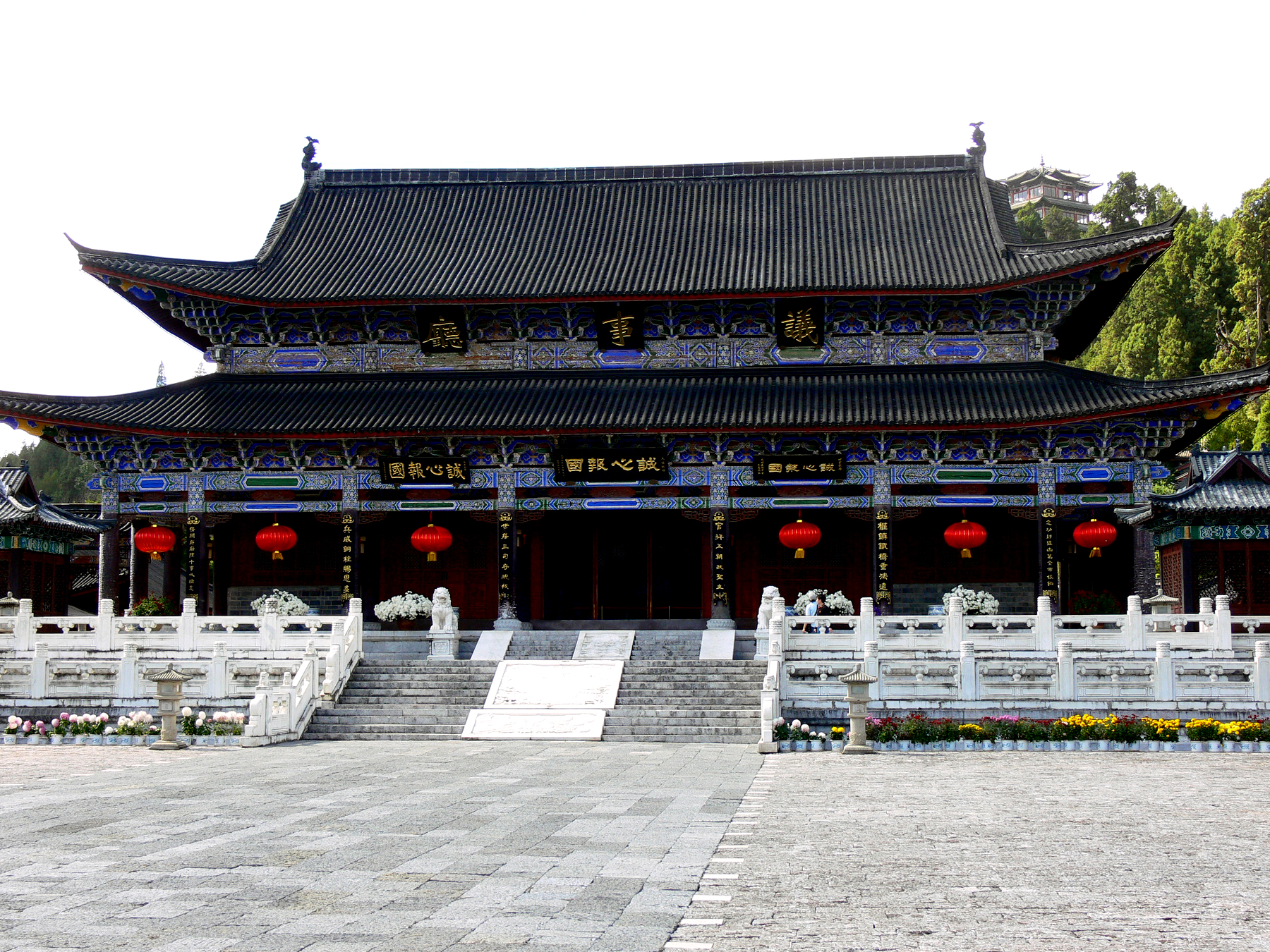
- Chiefdom of Lijiang's Palace Chamber

Chinese name
- Chinese: 土司
- Hanyu Pinyin: Tǔsī
Transcriptions
Standard Mandarin
- Hanyu Pinyin: Tǔsī
- Wade–Giles: t'u^{3}-szu^{1}

Tibetan name
- Tibetan: ཐོའུ་སི
Transcriptions
- Wylie: thovu si

Vietnamese name
- Vietnamese alphabet: Thổ ty
- Chữ Hán: 土司

Manchu name
- Manchu script: ᠠᡳᠮᠠᠨ ᡳ ᡥᠠᡶᠠᠨ
- Möllendorff: aiman i hafan

Tusi (Chinese: 土司; pinyin: Tǔsī; 'headmen, chieftains') were hereditary tribal leaders recognized as imperial officials by the Yuan, Ming, and Qing dynasties of China, and the Later Lê and Nguyễn dynasties of Vietnam. They ruled certain ethnic minorities in central China, western China, southwestern China, and the Indochinese peninsula nominally on behalf of the central government. As succession to the Tusi position was hereditary, these regimes effectively formed numerous autonomous petty dynasties under the suzerainty of the central court. This arrangement is known as the Tusi System or the Native Chieftain System (Chinese: 土司制度; pinyin: Tǔsī Zhìdù). It should not be confused with the Chinese tributary system or the Jimi system.

Tusi regimes were located primarily in Yunnan, Guizhou, Tibet, Sichuan, Chongqing, the Xiangxi Prefecture of Hunan, and the Enshi Prefecture of Hubei. Tusi entities were also established in the historical dependencies and frontier regions of China in what is today northern Myanmar, Laos, and northern Thailand. The Vietnamese Later Lê and Nguyễn dynasties also implemented the Tusi system.

In 2015, UNESCO designated three Tusi castles (Laosicheng, Tangya, and Hailongtun) as part of the "Tusi Sites" World Heritage Site in China, owing to the unique system of governance. It has been described on at least one occasion as sharing similarities with the "U.S. federal government's recognition of some Native American tribes as in some ways sovereign entities."

== History ==
=== Yuan dynasty ===
The tusi system was inspired by the Jimi system (Chinese: 羈縻制度) implemented in regions of ethnic minorities groups during the Tang dynasty. It was established as a specific political term during the Yuan dynasty and was used as a political institution to administer newly acquired territories following their conquest of the Dali Kingdom in 1253.

Members of the former Duan imperial clan of the Dali Kingdom were appointed as governors-general with nominal authority using the title "Dali chief steward" (Chinese: 大理總管, p Dàlǐ Zǒngguǎn), and local leaders were co-opted under a variety of titles as administrators of the region. Some credit the Turkoman governor Sayyid Ajjal Shams al-Din Omar with introducing the system into China. Duan Xingzhi, the last emperor of Dali, was appointed as the first local ruler, and he accepted the stationing of a pacification commissioner there. Duan Xingzhi offered the Yuan maps of Yunnan and led a considerable army to serve as guides for the Yuan army. By the end of 1256, Yunnan was considered to have been pacified.

Under the Yuan dynasty, the native officials, or tusi, were the clients of a patron-client relationship. The patron, the Yuan emperors, exercised jurisdictional control over the client, but not his/her territory itself.

The tusi chieftains and local tribe leaders and kingdoms in Yunnan, Guizhou and Sichuan submitted to Yuan rule and were allowed to keep their titles. The Han Chinese Yang family ruling the Chiefdom of Bozhou which was recognized by the Song and Tang dynasties also received recognition by the subsequent Yuan and Ming dynasties. The Luo clan in Shuixi led by Ahua were recognized by the Yuan emperors, as they were by the Song emperors when led by Pugui and Tang emperors when led by Apei. They descended from the Shu Han era king Huoji who helped Zhuge Liang against Meng Huo. They were also recognized by the Ming dynasty.

=== Ming dynasty ===
In 1364, Zhu Yuanzhang conquered Huguang. Rather than building a bureaucratic system of his own in Huguang, Zhu chose to keep the native chieftaincy system implemented by the Yuan dynasty. He reappointed many tusi to the same posts as they had during the Yuan dynasty. After reunifying China under the Ming dynasty and becoming the Hongwu Emperor, he brought this practice to the entire southern border zone of the empire.

In 1381, Hongwu sent a force against the last remnant of the forces of the Yuan dynasty, led by the Prince of Liang Basalawarmi, who committed suicide. This left Duan Gong, a successor of Duan Xingzhi, as the last representative of the remaining Yuan forces. He refused to surrender and attempted to have the former realm of the Dali Kingdom recognized as a tributary state. When he was defeated in battle, the surviving Duan brothers were taken captive and escorted to the capital. There they were given an insignificant office in the interior. From then on, "permanent chieftains were replaced by transferable officials," formally appointed by the Ming court.

Local leaders were obliged to provide troops, suppress local rebellions, and pay tribute to Beijing annually, biennially, or triennially according to their distance. The post was hereditary as opposed to the examination system in China proper, but succession, promotion, and demotion were all controlled by the Ming administration which required each tusi to use a seal and an official charter. To establish legitimate successions, tusi were ordered to list their sons and nephews in AD 1436, to redo the list in quadruplicate in 1441, and to renew the list triennially in 1441 and again in 1485. The Ming dynasty also took over regencies of children younger than 15 in 1489.

Tusi chiefs could sometimes be female according to local customs and had full authority over their own tribesmen, but were kept under supervision by the Ming Ministry of Personnel or the Ministry of War. Areas of tusi administration tended to explode into violence or turmoil intermittently and would invariably provoke Ming military intervention. However, these incidents are generally attributed to provocations by Chinese settlers or corrupt officials and not the fault of the tribes themselves.

The native chieftain system was a mutual-beneficial cooperation between the central government and native chieftains. For a quite long time after the foundation of Ming, the rulers knew that the central government could only use limited amount of resources. Having a large number of armies stationed in southern borderland, an area with harsh natural environment and large number of Non-Han people, was too costly for Ming rulers. Thus, they decided to transfer part of ruling power to those local political rulers in exchange for their defense of the border zone.

==== Civil and military tusis ====
The Ming tusi were categorized into civil and military ranks. The civilian tusi were given the titles of Tu Zhifu ("native prefecture"), Tu Zhizhou ("native department") and Tu Zhixian ("native county") according to the size and population of their domains. Nominally, they had the same rank as their counterparts in the regular administration system. The central government gave more autonomy to those military tusi who controlled areas with fewer Han Chinese people and had underdeveloped infrastructure. They pledged loyalty to the Ming emperor but had almost unfettered power within their domains.

All the native chieftains were nominally subordinate to Pacification Commissioners (Xuanfushi, Xuanweishi, Anfushi). The Pacification Commissioners were also native chieftains who received their title from the Ming court. As a way of checking their power, Pacification Commissioners were put under the supervision of the Ministry of War.

Throughout its 276-year history, the Ming dynasty bestowed a total of 1608 tusi titles, 960 of which were military-rank and 648 were civilian-rank, the majority of which were in Yunnan, Guizhou and Sichuan. In Tibet, Qinghai and Sichuan, the Ming court sometimes gave both tusi titles and religious titles to leaders. As a result, those tusi had double identities. They played both the role of political leaders and religious leaders within their domains. For example, during the reign of the Yongle Emperor, the leader of the Jinchuan monastery assisted the Ming army in a battle against the Mongols. The leader was later given the title Yanhua Chanshi (演化禅师), or "Evolved Chan Master", and the power to rule 15 villages as his domain as a reward.

==== Power and privileges of Tusi ====
After a chieftain was recognized by the central government as a tusi, he would receive a patent of appointment, a bronze official seal, a belt decorated with gold, and a formal attire as uniform. The title of tusi was hereditary and passed down to an heir.

The entire clan of a tusi enjoyed privileges within the domain. In Ming China, the clan of a tusi was called Guanzu ("official clan"). Members of the official clan had higher social ranks than commoners and slaves. Only members of official clan, Han Chinese, and descendants of former officials were allowed to receive education and take examinations.

Each tusi could build and live in a yamen. A yamen was the headquarter of local officials that contained infrastructures, such as the courtroom, sacrificial altar, ancestral hall, granary, offices, and the living quarters of official's family.

The structure of government and way of adjudication varied in each domain because of the diversity of tusi's cultural backgrounds. Normally, there were no statute law in the domain. The will of the tusi was the law. A tusi had court and jail in his yamen and could imprison or punish his subjects as long as he thought it was necessary. For instance, Li Depu, the native official of Anping subprefecture in Guangxi province, brutally punished a serf for wearing white stockings because according to his dress rule only official clans were allowed to do so. Commoners ruled by tusi often called them Tu Huangdi ("local emperor"). This analogy between tusi and emperors in some way reflected the almost unfettered judicial power of a tusi in his domain.

Tusi were given the power of collecting tax in their domain. For seasonal religious rituals or sacrifices, tusi had rights to collect rice and copper coins from each local household. As the head of clan, each tusi had right to disposal the property of his clan.

Apart from bodyguards, tusi were allowed to maintain a private military, the size of which depended on their domain's resources, to better defend the borderland and suppress rebellion.

==== Responsibilities of native chieftains during the Ming Dynasty ====
The tusi were considered vassals of the Ming emperor. They enjoyed autonomy or semi-autonomy in their domains, but were expected to maintain order and defend the border zones for the Ming dynasty. When the Ming court wanted to start any campaign near their domains, the chieftains were required to lead their private armies and assist the Ming army in the battle. Those soldiers supplied by tusi were called Tu Bing ("native soldier"). In the campaign against Annam, the Ming court recruited a large number of native soldiers from the southern provinces.

Also, tusi were required to pay tributes to the Ming court. The periodic tribute goods sent by native chieftains contained various goods:

1. animals, such as horses and elephants
2. products made from rare wild animals, such as elephant tusks and rhinoceros’ horns
3. medicinal herbs
4. incense
5. silver utensils
6. minerals, such as tin

==== Income of tusi ====
Tusi received no regular salary or stipend from the government but they were allowed to collect tax from their subjects. These taxes could be paid with crops, textiles and money. Some tusi required their subjects to pay them copper coin and chickens as gifts at some specific events of their clan. For example, in Anping of Guangxi, each household was required to donate 400 copper coins during weddings and funerals of members of the tusi's family.

Tusi could get paid by the government for their assistance in the battles, but this did not happen regularly.

==== Conflicts ====
In 1388 the Ming–Mong Mao War was fought between the general Mu Ying and the semi-independent tusi of Mong Mao, Si Lunfa, located in what is now Tengchong in southwestern Yunnan.

In 1397 the Ming intervened in a Mong Mao succession dispute, known as the Ming–Mong Mao Intervention.

In the late 1300s, Đại Việt attacked the tusis on the Guangxi border. This in conjunction with the overthrow of the Trần dynasty by the Hồ dynasty led to the Fourth Chinese domination of Vietnam.

In 1438 the Mong Mao rebelled again and their leader Si Renfa attacked local tusi along the Yunnan border. Si Renfa was defeated in 1442 and captured by the Ava king, who turned him over to Ming custody, where he died in 1446.

In 1621 the Yi people instigated the She-An Rebellion in Sichuan and Guizhou, which lasted until 1629 and took an astronomical toll on Ming resources before it was quelled.

=== Gaitu Guiliu ===
Gaitu guiliu (改土歸流) was a policy of abolishing the rule of local tusi (土司) and replace (gai 改) them by a "mainstream" (liu 流) direct administration. Gaitu guiliu was heavily enforced during the Ming and Qing periods.

During the Ming dynasty, there were 179 tusi and 255 tuguan (Chinese: 土官, "native civilian commanders") in Yunnan and titles were generally retained with the exception of punishment for severe crimes. The tusi were greatly reduced during the Ming-Qing era. By the time of the Yongzheng Emperor, there were only around 41 left in Yunnan, including Cheli, Gengma, Longchuan, Ganya (modern Yingjiang), Nandian, Menglian, Zhefang, Zhanda, Lujiang, Mangshi, Mengmao (Ruili), Nalou, Kuirong, Shierguan, Menghua, Jingdong, Mengding, Yongning, Fuzhou, Wandian, Zhenkang, and Beishengzhou.

Under Ming administration, the jurisdictional authority of tusi began to be replaced with state territorial authority. The tusi acted as stop gaps until enough Chinese settlers arrived for a "tipping point" to be reached, and they were then converted into official prefectures and counties to be fully annexed into the central bureaucratic system of the Ming dynasty. This process was known as gaitu guiliu (simplified Chinese: 改土归流; traditional Chinese: 改土歸流), or "turning native rule into regular administration". The most notable example of this was the consolidation of southwestern tusi chiefdoms into the province of Guizhou in 1413.

Building upon the Yuan precedent, the Ming began its colonization of the southwest in the 1370s, and though its military strength waxed and waned, it was able to eliminate the largest autonomous kingdoms in the southwest by the early decades of the seventeenth century. By the time of the Ming-Qing transition, what remained in the southwest were only a few small autonomous polities, and the Rebellion of the Three Feudatories (sanfan zhi luan; 1673-81) did much to erase these from the landscape. In short, the Yongzheng Emperor's appointment of his trusted Manchu official Ortai (1680-1745) and the aggressive campaign against tusi offices they initiated in the 1720s in the southwest should be seen as the end point, not the beginning, of China's colonization of the southwest.

— John E. Herman

In sum, gaitu guiliu was the process of replacing tusi with state-appointed officials, the transition from jurisdictional sovereignty to territorial sovereignty, and the start of formal empire rather than informal.

=== End ===
In Guangxi, the Qing Yongzheng Emperor took on a campaign to reform native Zhuang following which 87 out of 128 tusis were replaced by officials. At the start of the 20th century, there were eight tusis remaining, all within present-day Daxin County. In 1928, Xincheng, the last tusi in Guangxi was converted to a county, ending the gaitu guiliu reforms.

On 23 January 1953, the P.R. China (PRC) established the Xishuangbanna Dai Autonomous Region and ended the last Tusi system in Sipsongpanna.

== Native Chieftain titles ==
The native chieftain system also fit in the Nine Ranks system (Jiu Pin; "九品"). The Nine Ranks system is a system of gradations used by regimes from post-Han to Qing. Under this system, all the officials in the bureaucracy were put into nine major categories: upper-upper, upper-middle, upper-lower, middle-upper, middle-middle, middle-lower, lower-upper, lower-middle, and lower-lower. Each category was given a rank numbered from 1 to 9. The rank 1 is the highest rank and the rank 9 is the lowest. Each rank was divided into two grades: upper (正) and lower (從).

The central government gave different titles to native chieftains and these titles had different ranks in the Nine Ranks system:

	Official name	Rank
1	Junmin Xuanweishi(軍民宣慰使)	
2	Xuanweishi (宣慰使)	3b
3	Xuanfushi (宣撫使)	4b
4	Anfushi (安撫使)	5b
5	Zhaotaoshi (招討使)	5b
6	Xunjianshi (巡檢使)	9b
7	Tu Zhifu (土知府)	4a
8	Tu Zhizhou (土知州)	5b
9	Tu Zhixian (土知縣)	6b or 7b
10	Zhangguan(長官)	6a
11	Manyi Zhangguan(蠻夷長官)	

== List of tusi ==
=== Chongqing province tusi ===
- Chiefdom of Shizhu (Chinese: 石砫土司), ruled Shizhu, ended in 1761 when the final tusi became a local magistrate
- Chiefdom of Youyang (Chinese: 酉阳土司), ruled Youyang Tujia and Miao Autonomous County

=== Guangxi province tusi ===
- Chiefdom of Yongshun (Chinese: 永順土司), ruled Yizhou District, abolished in 1928 and merged into Yizhou District
- Anping
- Xincheng
- Wancheng

=== Guizhou province tusi ===
- Chiefdom of Bozhou (Chinese: 播州土司), ruled Bozhou (present day Zunyi), abolished after a failed rebellion in 1600
- Chiefdom of Caotang (Chinese: 草塘安抚司), in Houchang (猴场镇), Weng'an County
- Chiefdom of Huangping (Chinese: 黄平安抚司), ruled in Huangping County. Under the jurisdiction of Bozhou
- Chiefdom of Shuidong (Chinese: 水東土司), ruled Shuidong (present day Sinan County), abolished after a failed rebellion in 1630
- Chiefdom of Shuixi (Chinese: 水西土司), ruled Shuixi (present day Dafang County), abolished in 1698
- Chiefdom of Sinan (Chinese: 思南土司), ruled Sinan, abolished in 1414
- Chiefdom of Sizhou (Chinese: 思州土司), ruled Sizhou (present day Cengong County), abolished in 1414

=== Hubei province tusi ===
- Chiefdom of Dawang (Chinese: 大旺土司), ruled Jiusi (旧司镇) in Laifeng County
- Chiefdom of Gaoluo (Chinese: 高罗土司), ruled Gaoluo (高罗镇) in Xuan'en County
- Chiefdom of Jindong (Chinese: 金峒土司), ruled in Jindong Village (金洞司村), Huangjindong (黄金洞乡) in Xianfeng County
- Chiefdom of Longtan (Chinese: 龙潭土司), ruled Longtansi (龙潭司村) in Qingping town (清坪镇), Xianfeng County
- Chiefdom of Rongmei (Chinese: 容美土司), ruled Rongmei (容美镇) in Hefeng County
- Chiefdom of Sanmao (Chinese: 散毛土司), ruled in Laifeng County
- Chiefdom of Shinan (Chinese: 施南土司), ruled in Shuitianba (水田坝) in Xuan'en County
- Chiefdom of Zhongdong (Chinese: 忠峒安抚司), ruled in Shadaogou (沙道沟镇) in Xuan'en County
- Chiefdom of Zhongjian (Chinese: 忠建土司), ruled Lijiahe (李家河镇) in Xuan'en County
- Chiefdom of Zhonglu (Chinese: 忠路土司), ruled Zhonglu in Lichuan
- Chiefdom of Zhongxiao (Chinese: 忠孝土司), ruled in Yuanbaoxiang (元堡乡) in Lichuan

=== Sichuan province tusi ===
- Chiefdom of Bathang (Chinese: zh:巴塘土司), ruled Batang County
- Chiefdom of Canbolang (Chinese: 參卜郎千戶所), ruled Litang County
- Chiefdom of Chakla (Chinese: zh:明正土司), ruled Kangding County
- Chiefdom of Chuchen (Chinese: zh:促侵土司), ruled Jinchuan County
- Kingdom of Derge (Chinese: zh:德格王), ruled Dêgê County
- Chiefdom of Dongbohanhu (Chinese: 董卜韓胡宣慰使司), ruled Jinchuan County
- Chiefdom of Leipo (Chinese: 雷坡長官司), ruled Leibo County
- Chiefdom of Lengbian (Chinese: zh:冷边土司), ruled Luding County
- Chiefdom of Lithang (Chinese: zh:理塘土司), ruled Litang County
- Chiefdom of Mang'erzhe (Chinese: 芒儿者安抚司), ruled in Mao'ergai (毛儿盖镇) in Songpan County
- Chiefdom of Manyi (Chinese: 蠻夷長官司), ruled Pingshan County
- Chiefdom of Mingzheng (Chinese: zh:明正土司), ruled Kangding County
- Chiefdom of Mo'erkan (Chinese: 磨兒勘招討司), ruled Garzê Tibetan Autonomous Prefecture and Markam County
- Chiefdom of Muchuan (Chinese: 沐川長官司), ruled Pingshan County
- Kingdom of Muli (Chinese: zh:木里土司), ruled Muli Tibetan Autonomous County
- Chiefdom of Muping (Chinese: zh:穆坪土司), ruled Baoxing County
- Chiefdom of Nixi (Chinese: 泥溪長官司), ruled Pingshan County
- Chiefdom of Pingyi (Chinese: 平夷長官司), ruled Pingshan County and Suijiang County
- Chiefdom of Shenbian (Chinese: zh:沈边土司), ruled Luding County
- Chiefdom of Tianquan (Chinese: zh:天全土司), ruled Tianquan County
- Chiefdom of Yidu (Chinese: 夷都長官司), ruled Pingshan County

=== Yunnan province tusi ===
- Chiang Hung, ruled Sipsong Panna (present day Xishuangbanna Dai Autonomous Prefecture)
- Kokang - Chiefdom of Kokang
- Chiefdom of Heqing (Chinese: 鶴慶土司), ruled Heqing County, descendants of Gao Shengtai, became a local magistrate in 1683
- Chiefdom of Ganya (Chinese: 干崖土司), ruled Yingjiang County, abolished in 1949
- Chiefdom of Gengma (Chinese: 耿馬司), ruled Gengma Dai and Va Autonomous County, abolished in 1950
- Chiefdom of Jiantang (Gyelthang) (Tibetan: རྒྱལ་ཐང) (Chinese: 建塘土司), ruled Shangri-la
- Chiefdom of Lijiang (Chinese: 麗江土司), ruled Lijiang
- Chiefdom of Lujiang (Chinese: 潞江土司), ruled Lujiangzhen (潞江镇) in Longyang District
- Chiefdom of Luomeng (Chinese: 落蒙萬戶府), ruled Shilin Yi Autonomous County
- Meng Xon (ᥛᥫᥒᥰ ᥑᥩᥢᥴ), or Chiefdom of Mangshi (Chinese: 芒市土司), ruled Mangshi
- Chiefdom of Mengban (Chinese: 勐板土千總), ruled Mangshi
- Chiefdom of Menghai (Chinese: 勐海土司), ruled Menghai County
- Chiefdom of Menghan (Chinese: 勐罕土司), ruled Jinghong
- Chiefdom of Mengjiaodong (Chinese: 勐角董土司), ruled Cangyuan Va Autonomous County
- Chiefdom of Mong Mao (Chinese: 勐卯土司), ruled Ruili
- Chiefdom of Nandian (Chinese: 南甸土司), ruled Zhedao (遮岛镇), in Lianghe County
- Chiefdom of Wadian (Chinese: 瓦甸土司), ruled in Tengchong
- Chiefdom of Yao'an (Chinese: 姚安土司), ruled Yao'an County, descendants of Gao Shengtai
- Chiefdom of Yongning (Chinese: 永寧土司), ruled Yongning (present day Ninglang Yi Autonomous County)
- Chiefdom of Yongsheng (Chinese: 永勝土司), ruled Yongsheng County, descendants of Gao Shengtai
- Chiefdom of Zhefang (Chinese: 遮放土司), ruled Mangshi
- Chiefdom of Zhendao (Yangthang) (Tibetan: ཡང་ཐང་།) (Chinese: 鎮道土司), ruled Xiaozhongdian (小中甸镇) in Shangri-la

=== Tibetan tusi ===
- Chiefdom of Chuchen, or Chiefdom of Greater Jinchuan (Chinese: 大金川土司), ruled present day Jinchuan County, annexed by Qing China in Jinchuan campaigns
- Chiefdom of Tsanlha (Tibetan: བཙན་ལྷ་རྒྱལ་པོ, Wylie: btsan lha rgyal po), or Chiefdom of Lesser Jinchuan (Chinese: 小金川土司), ruled present day Xiaojin County, annexed by Qing China in Jinchuan campaigns
- Chiefdom of Bathang (Tibetan: འབའ་ཐང་རྒྱལ་པོ, Wylie: ʼbaʼ thang rgyal po, Chinese: 巴塘土司), ruled Batang County, revolted against Qing China in 1905 and was annexed in the next year
- Chiefdom of Lithang (Tibetan: ལི་ཐང་རྒྱལ་པོ, Wylie: li thang rgyal po, Chinese: 理塘土司), ruled Litang County, revolted against Qing China in 1905 and was annexed in the next year
- Chiefdom of Béri (Tibetan: བེ་རི་རྒྱལ་པོ, Wylie: be ri rgyal po) or Chiefdom of Baili (Chinese: 白利土司), ruled Béri (present day part of Garzê County)
- Kingdom of Chakla (Tibetan: ལྕགས་ལ་རྒྱལ་པོ, Wylie: lcags la rgyal po) or Chiefdom of Mingzheng (Chinese: 明正土司), ruled Dartsedo (present day Kangding)
- Kingdom of Derge (Tibetan: སྡེ་དགེ་རྒྱལ་པོ, Wylie: sde dge rgyal po; Chinese: 德格土司), ruled Dêgê County
- Chiefdom of Muli (Tibetan: སྨི་ལི་རྒྱལ་པོ, Wylie: smi li rgyal po; Chinese: 木里土司), ruled present day Muli Tibetan Autonomous County
- Kingdom of Powo (Tibetan: ཀཿགནམ་རྒྱ་པོ, Wylie: ka: gnam rgyal po; Chinese: 波密土王), ruled present day Bomê County, annexed by Tibet in 1928. Descendants of Drigum Tsenpo.
- Chiefdom of Zhuoni (Tibetan: ཅོ་ནེ་དཔོན་པོ, Wylie: co ne dpon po; Chinese: 卓尼土司), ruled Gannan Tibetan Autonomous Prefecture
- Chiefdom of Duogandan (Chinese: 朵甘丹招討司), ruled Garzê Tibetan Autonomous Prefecture and Yushu Tibetan Autonomous Prefecture
- Chiefdom of Duogancangtang (Chinese: 朵甘倉溏招討司), ruled Ngawa Tibetan and Qiang Autonomous Prefecture
- Chiefdom of Duogan (Chinese: 朵甘宣慰使司), ruled Garzê Tibetan Autonomous Prefecture
- Chiefdom of Duoganchuan (Chinese: 朵甘川招討司), ruled Garzê Tibetan Autonomous Prefecture
- Chiefdom of Duogansi (Chinese: 朵甘思千戶所), ruled Garzê Tibetan Autonomous Prefecture
- Chiefdom of Duoganlongda (Chinese: 朵甘隴答招討司), ruled Chamdo and Garzê Tibetan Autonomous Prefecture
- Kingdom of Lingtsang (Tibetan: གླིང་ཚང, Wylie: gling tshang; Chinese: 林蔥土司), ruled Garzê Tibetan Autonomous Prefecture
- Chiefdom of Changhexi (Chinese: 長河西千戶所), ruled Garzê Tibetan Autonomous Prefecture
- Chiefdom of Longda (Chinese: 隴答衛指揮使司), ruled Garzê Tibetan Autonomous Prefecture
- Chiefdom of Nangqên (Tibetan: ནང་ཆེན་རྒྱལ་པོ, Wylie: nang chen rgyal po; Chinese: 囊謙土司), ruled Nangqên County
- Chiefdom of Dasima (Chinese: 答思麻萬戶府), ruled Hainan Tibetan Autonomous Prefecture

== See also ==
- Chiefdom
- Jimi system
- Tributary system of China
- Mandala (political model)
- Saopha
- Mueang

== Bibliography ==
- Dardess, John (2012). Ming China 1368-1644 A Concise History of A Resilient Empire. Rowman & Littlefield Publishers, Inc.
- Herman, John E. (2007). Amid the Clouds and Mist China's Colonization of Guizhou, 1200-1700. Harvard University Asia Center.
- Shin, Leo Kwok-yueh (2006). The making of the Chinese state: ethnicity and expansion on the Ming borderlands. Cambridge University Press
- Took, Jennifer (2005). A Native Chieftaincy in Southwest China: Franchising a Tai Chieftaincy under Tusi System of Late Imperial China. Leiden: Brill.
- Hucker, Charles O. (1985). A dictionary of official titles in Imperial China. Stanford University Press.
