= House of Gao =

House of Gao may refer to:

- Rulers of Northern Qi (550–577)
- Rulers of Jingnan (924–963)
- Rulers of Chiefdom of Yao'an (1147–1729)
