= Chiefdom of Mangshi =

Asian state

Chiefdom of Mangshi ᥝᥥᥒᥰ ᥛᥫᥒᥰ 芒市土司
- 1443–1955
- Territory in modern Yunnan
- Status: Native Chiefdom of China
- Capital: Mangshi
- Common languages: Tai Nuea language
- Government: Monarchy
- Tusi
  - 1443–1459: Fang Dingzheng (first)
  - 1948–1955: Fang Yulong (last)
- History
  - Established: 1443
  - Disestablished: 1955
| Preceded by | Succeeded by |
| Mong Mao | People's Republic of China |
- Today part of: China

The Chiefdom of Mangshi, officially Mangshi Yuyi Zhangguansi and Mangshi Anfusi, was a Dai autonomous Tusi chiefdom in the west of Yunnan, China, from 1443 to 1955. In 1443, the Ming dynasty established Mangshi Yuyi Zhangguansi (芒市御夷長官司) because a Mangshi chief made a contribution in Luchuan–Pingmian campaigns, and then upgraded to Mangshi Anfusi (芒市安撫司) in 1640. Chiefdom of Mangshi has an absolute dictatorship in politics, military, economy at the territory, and use the rule of primogeniture.

In the Republic of China period, the central government used many methods try to abolish the Chiefdom of Mangshi, for example, established a direct control government "Luxi Administrate Bureau" (潞西設治局). But the Chiefdom of Mangshi allied with other chiefdoms to counteract the abolishment. At its worst, chiefdoms had a consideration for independence from China. Finally, the central government compromised with chiefdoms.

After People's Republic of China controlled this area, the central government launched the Chinese Land Reform Movement. The last Chief of Mangshi, Fang Yulong lost his power and land, finally abolished in 1955.

== Chaophas ==
Chiefdom of Mangshi contains 24 official Chaophas in history.

| Generation | Name in Chinese | Name in Pinyin | Period | Duration | Notes |
|---|---|---|---|---|---|
| 1 | 放定正 | Fang Ding-zheng | 1443－1459 | 16 | |
| 2 | 放貞 | Fang Zhen | 1465－1487 | 22 | Son |
| 3 | 放革 | Fang Ge | 1506－1518 | 12 | Son |
| 4 | 放輔 | Fang Fu | 1523－1542 | 19 | Son |
| 5 | 放福 | Fang Fu | 1543－1573 | 30 | Son |
| 6 | 放國忠 | Fang Guo-zhong | 1573－1591 | 18 | Son, marriage with Yue Feng's daughter, who betrayed Ming. He was killed by Ming in 1591 with his father Fang Fu. |
| 7 | 放緯 | Fang Wei | 1592－1595 | 4 | Fang family's relatives |
| 8 | 放珀 | Fang Po | 1596－1639 | 43 | Second son |
| 9 | 放廷臣 | Fang Ting-chen | 1640－1647 | 7 | Son |
| 10 | 放國璋 | Fang Guo-zhang | 1648－1658 | 10 | Son |
| 11 | 放愛眾 | Fang Ai-zhong | 1661－1664 | 3 | Son |
| Acting | 放廷弼 | Fang Ting-bi | 1668－1673 | 5 | Fang Ting-chen's little brother |
| 12 | 放彌高 | Fang Mi-gao | 1673－1685 | 12 | Fang Ai-zhong's son |
| Acting | 放彌合 | Fang Mi-he | 1685－1694 | 9 | Fang Mi-gao's little brother |
| 13 | 放天球 | Fang Tian-qiu | 1696－1713 | 17 | Fang Mi-gao's son |
| 14 | 放仁 | Fang Ren | 1716－1738 | 22 | Son |
| 15 | 放作藩 | Fang Zuo-fan | 1741－1770 | 29 | Son |
| 16 | 放愈彰 | Fang Yu-zhang | 1771－1772 | 1 | Son |
| Acting | 放作藩 | Fang Zuo-fan | 1772－1774 | 2 | |
| 17 | 放愈著 | Fang Yu-zhu | 1774－1796 | 22 | Fang Zuo-fan's second son |
| 18 | 放澤重 | Fang Ze-zhong | 1798－1816 | 18 | Son |
| Acting | 放愈新 | Fang Yu-xin | 1816－1821 | 5 | |
| Acting | 放澤浩 | Fang Ze-hao | 1821－? | ? | Fang Ze-zhong's elder cousin |
| 19 | 放承恩 | Fang Cheng-en | 1826－1849 | 23 | Son |
| Acting | 放世恩 | Fang Shi-en | 1851－1858 | 7 | Fang Cheng-en's little brother |
| 20 | 放慶祿 | Fang Qing-lu | 1875－1877 | 2 | Fang Cheng-en's step-son, Fang Shi-en's son |
| Acting | 放慶壽 | Fang Qing-shou | 1879－1889 | 10 | Fang Zheng-de's uncle |
| Acting | 放慶雍 | Fang Qing-yong | 1889－? | ? | Fang Zheng-de's uncle |
| 21 | 放正德 | Fang Zheng-de | 1889－1910 | 21 | Fang Qing-lu's son |
| 22 | 方克明 | Fang Ke-ming | 1910－1931 | 21 | Son |
| 23 | 方雲龍 | Fang Yun-long | 1933－1936 | 3 | Son |
| Acting | 方克光 | Fang Ke-guang | 1936－1953 | 17 | Fang Zheng-de's 3rd son |
| Acting | 方克勝 | Fang Ke-sheng | 1944－1948 | 4 | Fang Zheng-de's 4th son |
| 24 | 方御龍 | Fang Yu-long | 1948－1955 | 7 | Fang Ke-ming's 5th son |
| Acting | 方化龍 | Fang Hua-long | 1953－1955 | 2 | Fang Ke-guang's son |
