= Getse Mahapandita =

Tibetan Buddhist lama (1761–1829)

Getse Mahapandita (1761–1829) (Getse Mahāpaṇḍita Gyurme Tsewang Chokdrub; Wylie: dge rtse paN chen 'gyur med mchog grub) was an important Nyingma scholar affiliated with Kathok Monastery.

== Biography and work ==
Getse Mahapandita was instrumental in arranging the block printing of the 'Collection of Nyingma Tantras' (Tibetan: Nyingma Gyübum) gathered by Jigme Lingpa, and for which Getse Mahapandita wrote the catalogue. Getse Mahapandita solicited the carving of the blocks for the block printing of the Nyingma Gyübum through the patronage of the Derge Royal Family, who favoured and honoured Jigme Lingpa. Getse Mahapandita also arranged for the printing of texts by Jigme Lingpa and Longchenpa. Getse Mahapandita proof read all of these works.

He was the primary chaplain of Tsewang Lhamo, the queen of Derge. "Getse's Collected Works contain many writings that have a direct connection to Tsewang Lhamo and in the aggregate are the best source on her life and times. For instance, he composed a detailed commentary on Jigme Lingpa's epistle to Tsewang Lhamo."

He was said to be the reincarnation of Jampa Bum (kaH thog khri rabs 03 byams pa 'bum, 1179–1252), the third abbot of Katok Monastery.

== Teachers ==
- Dodrupchen Kunzang Shenpen
- Ngor Khenchen Palden Chökyong
- Changkya Rolpé Dorje
- Dzogchenpa Ati Tenpé Gyaltsen

== Students ==
- Ngedön Tendzin Zangpo (Wylie: nges don bstan 'dzin bzang po) (1759–1792), the Third Dzogchen Rinpoche
- Rigdzin Paljor Gyatso (Wylie: rig 'dzin dpal 'byor rgya mtsho) (1770–1809), the third Shechen Rabjam Rinpoche.
- He gave empowerments to Jigme Gyelwai Nyugu (Wylie: 'jigs med rgyal ba'i myu gu, 1765–1842).

== Variant forms of name ==
- Gyurme Tsewang Chokdrup (Wylie: 'gyur med tshe dbang mchog grub)
- Katok Getse Mahapandita
