= Batang, Sichuan =

Batang Town
- Town
- Xiaqiong Town

Tibetan transcription(s)
  - Tibetan: བྱ་ཁྱུང་ཀྲེན།
  - Wylie: bya khyung kren

Chinese transcription(s)
  - Chinese: 夏邛镇
  - Pinyin: Xiàqióng Zhèn
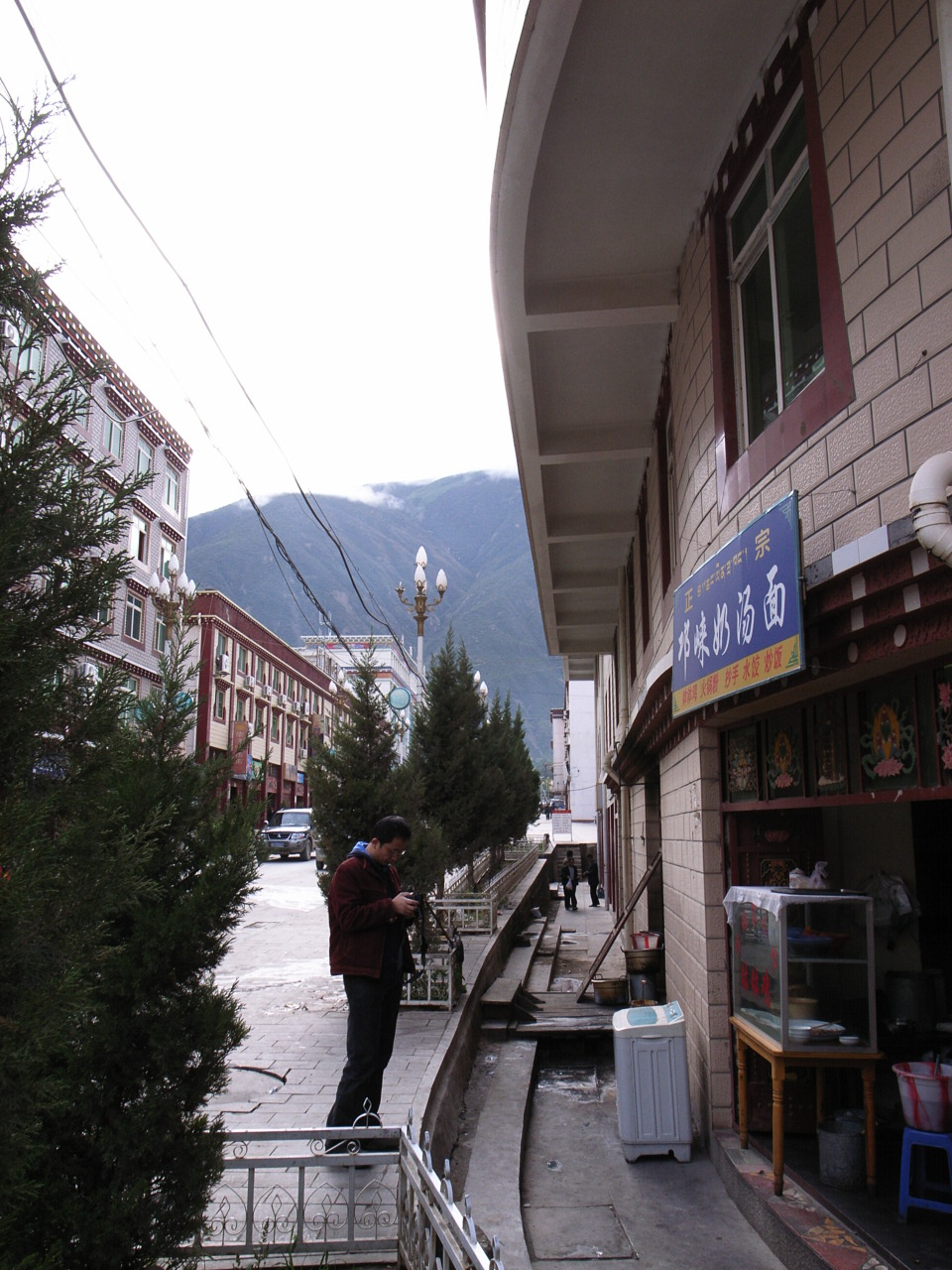
- Bistro in Batang

- Location within Sichuan
- Country: China
- Province: Sichuan
- Prefecture: Garzê Tibetan Autonomous Prefecture
- County: Batang County
- Time zone: UTC+8 (China Standard)

Batang Town (Tibetan: འབའ་ཐང; Chinese: 巴塘; pinyin: Bātáng), officially Xiaqiong Town (Tibetan: བྱ་ཁྱུང་ཀྲེན།, Wylie: bya khyung kren; Chinese: 夏邛镇; pinyin: Xiàqióng Zhèn), is a town in Batang County, Garzê Tibetan Autonomous Prefecture, Sichuan Province, in the China on the main route between Chengdu and Lhasa, Tibet, and just east of the Jinsha ('Golden Sands') River, or Upper Yangtze River. It is at an elevation of 2,700 metres (8,900 feet).

== Descriptions, geography and products ==
The name is a transliteration from Tibetan meaning a vast grassland where sheep can be heard everywhere (from ba – the sound made by the sheep + Tibetan tang which means a plain or steppe).

According to one source the name in Chinese is 八塘 (Pinyin: Bātáng), but, according to The Contemporary Atlas of China (1988), it should be written 巴塘, which also is rendered Bātáng in Pinyin. It is alternatively known as Xiaqiong.

'The plain of Batang, which runs east and west, is some 2 1/2 miles [4.0 km] in length, with a breadth of from three-quarters of a mile to a mile [1.2 to 1.6 km]. In the high mountains surrounding it there are three openings—the valley of the Hsiao-pa-chung River to the south-east by which we entered, and two valleys to the north-east and south-west by which the Batang River obtains ingress and egress. Three roads lead along these valleys—to Litang, to the State of Dergé, whose frontier is a couple of days' march distant, and to Tibet and Yunnan respectively."

Alexander Hosie, the British Consul at Chengdu, who visited Batang in September 1904, reported that there was a small lamasery and the industries consisted of making black leather and a barley beer (chang). He reported that the population was about 2,000 with some 400 Tibetan houses and about 500 families "only 70 to 80 of which are Chinese." Batang also played a significant role for hundreds of years in the traditional tea and horse trade between China, Tibet and India, being an important caravan stop for mule trains on the 'tea horse road' between Ya'an in Sichuan and Lhasa.

William Mesny in 1905 described Batang (which he visited in 1877) as having a population of 300 families consisting "only of Tibetans and half-castes." There were two hereditary princes (Wang 王 in Chinese, Gyalpo in Tibetan, lit. "King" or "Prince") claiming to be descendants of chiefs from Yunnan.

The old Tibetan name of the town, M'Bah, is a transliteration from Tibetan meaning a vast grassland where sheep can be heard everywhere (from ba – the sound made by the sheep + Tibetan tang which means a plain or steppe).

It is warmer here than most of Tibet (because of the lower altitude) and is reported to be a friendly, easy-going place, surrounded by barley fields. The plain surrounding the town is unusually fertile and produces two harvests a year. The main products include: rice, maize, barley, wheat, peas, cabbages, turnips, onions, grapes, pomegranates, peaches, apricots, water melons and honey. There are also cinnabar (mercury sulphide) mines from which mercury is extracted.

The Abbé Auguste Desgodins, who was on a mission to Tibet from 1855 to 1870, wrote: "gold dust is found in all the rivers and even the streams of eastern Tibet". He says that in the town of Bathan or Batan, with which he was personally acquainted, there were about 20 people regularly involved in washing for gold in spite of the severe laws against it.

== Chöde Gaden Pendeling Monastery ==
In the southwest of the town is the large Gelugpa Chöde Gaden Pendeling Monastery (Kangning Si 康宁寺) which now has some 500 monks. Colourful cham dances are held outside the town each year on the 26th of the ninth Tibetan month.

'The Batang lamasery, which stands in the west of the plain near the left bank of the Batang River just above its junction with the small river, is a very large and imposing group of buildings surrounded by a high white wall encircled by a row of cypress and willow trees. It has two golden roofs and numerous pinnacles, like the monastery at Litang. It accommodates lamas or priests; variously estimated to number from 1,300 to 1,700, but it must not be supposed that this number is always resident, for lamas have the privilege of coming and going and apparently living as they please. I was here the spectator of a performance somewhat similar to that given at Ta-chien-lu. The scene was the grassy right bank of the Batang River below its junction with the small river, to reach which the former had to be crossed by a wooden bridge near the lamasery. Here tents were pitched in the form of a square, with an audience of lamas on two sides, while the other two sides were given up to the lama performers and the spectators from the town respectively. Round the square were smaller tents pitched by the well-to-do, and kitchens were hard at work cooking for their inmates. We strolled through the different booths, and created no little excitement."

== History and strategic importance ==
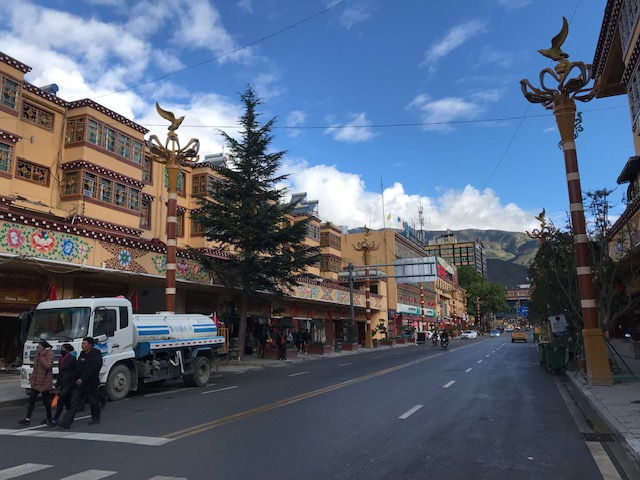
Jinxianzi Ave, Batang

Batang was visited in the 1840s by the French Lazarite priests Évariste Régis Huc and Joseph Gabet and their Monguor convert Samdadchiemb, who were attempting to reopen the Catholic mission in Lhasa. They described it as a large, very populous and wealthy town.

Batang marked the farthest point of Tibetan rule on the route to Chengdu:

"The temporal power of the Supreme Lama ends at Bathang. The frontiers of Tibet, properly so called, were fixed in 1726, on the termination of a great war between the Tibetans and the Chinese. Two days before you arrive at Bathang, you pass, on the top of a mountain, a stone monument, showing what was arranged at that time between the government of Lha-Ssa and that of Peking, on the subject of boundaries. At present, the countries situate east of Bathang are independent of Lha-Ssa in temporal matters. They are governed by a sort of feudal princes, originally appointed by the Chinese Emperor, and still acknowledging his paramount authority. These petty sovereigns are bound to go every third year to Peking, to offer their tribute to the Emperor."

Spencer Chapman gives a similar, but more detailed, account of this border agreement:

"In 1727, as a result of the Chinese having entered Lhasa, the boundary between China and Tibet was laid down as between the head-waters of the Mekong and Yangtze rivers, and marked by a pillar, a little to the south-west of Batang. Land to the west of this pillar was administered from Lhasa, while the Tibetan chiefs of the tribes to the east came more directly under China. This historical Sino-Tibetan boundary was used until 1910. The states Derge, Nyarong, Batang, Litang, and the five Hor States—to name the more important districts—are known collectively in Lhasa as Kham, an indefinite term suitable to the Tibetan Government, who are disconcertingly vague over such details as treaties and boundaries."

Mr. A. Hosie, the British Consul at Chengdu, made a quick trip from Batang to the Tibetan border escorted by Chinese authorities, in September 1904, on the promise that he would not even put a foot over the border into Tibet. He describes the border marker as being a 3½ day journey (about 50 mi or 80 km) to the south and slightly west of Batang. It was a "well-worn, four-sided pillar of sandstone, about 3 feet in height, each side measuring some 18 inches. There was no inscription on the stone, and when unthinkingly I made a movement to look for writing on the Tibetan side, the Chinese officials at once stepped in front of me and barred the road to Tibet. Looking into Tibet the eye met a sea of grass-covered treeless hills. and from the valley at the foot of the Ningching Shan [which separate the valleys of the upper Mekong from that of the Jinsha or upper Yangtze] rose smoke from the camp fires of 400 Tibetan troops charged with the protection of the frontier. There was no time to make any prolonged inspection, for the Chinese authorities were anxious for me to leave as soon as possible."

The town was completely destroyed by an earthquake in 1868 or 1869. Mr. Hosie, on the other hand, dates this earthquake to 1871.

In 1904 the States of Chala, Litang and Batang were "administered by native chiefs under the superintendence of the Chinese Commissaries at Ta-chien-lu, Litang, and Batang respectively." In Batang there were two chiefs and several "Shelngo" (Chinese: Hsing-ngo, or Pinyin: Xinge) who occupy "the same position as the head of 100 families in the State of Chala." The Tibetans were under the control of their chiefs while the Chinese were dealt solely by their own authorities, or in cases where member of both communities are involved, cases are dealt with by the authorities of the nationality of the plaintiff.

The Qing government sent an imperial official to the region to begin reasserting Qing control soon after the invasion of Tibet under Francis Younghusband in 1904, which alarmed the Manchu Qing rulers in China, but the locals revolted and killed him. The Qing government in Beijing then appointed Zhao Erfeng, the Governor of Xining, "Army Commander of Tibet" to reintegrate Tibet into China. He was sent in 1905 (though other sources say this occurred in 1908) on a punitive expedition and began destroying many monasteries in Kham and Amdo and implementing a process of sinification of the region:

"He abolished the powers of the Tibetan local leaders and appointed Chinese magistrates in their places. He introduced new laws that limited the number of lamas and deprived monasteries of their temporal power and inaugurated schemes for having the land cultivated by Chinese immigrants.
Zhao's methods in eastern Tibet uncannily prefigured the Communist policies nearly half a century later. They were aimed at the extermination of the Tibetan clergy, the assimilation of territory and repopulation of the Tibetan plateaus with poor peasants from Sichuan. Like the later Chinese conquerors, Zhao's men looted and destroyed Tibetan monasteries, melted down religious images and tore up sacred texts to use to line the soles of their boots and, as the Communists were also to do later, Zhao Erfeng worked out a comprehensive scheme for the redevelopment of Tibet that covered military training reclamation work, secular education, trade and administration."

Mesny reports in May 1905 that there was a Chinese Dongzhi (Wade–Giles: Tung-chih) 'Prefect', and a Dusi (W-G: Tu-szü) or 'Major' with a local rank of Dongling (W-G: Tung-ling) = 'Commandant' or 'Brigadier General', stationed in the town with authority over the two local chiefs, who were referred to as Yingguan (W–G: Ying-kuan) or 'Regimental Officers'. The main chief had at least 200 mounted and 600-foot soldiers.

In February 1910 Zhao Erfeng invaded Lhasa to begin a process of reforms intended to break the control of the religious hierarchy. This invasion led to the Dalai Lama fleeing to India. The situation was soon to change, however, as, after the fall of the Qing dynasty in October 1911, Zhao's soldiers mutinied and beheaded him.

The American missionary Albert Shelton was killed, probably by brigands, on 17 February 1922 near Batang. The British explorer George Pereira died in the town on 20 October 1923.

In 1932 the Sichuan warlord, Liu Wenhui (Chinese: 刘文辉; 1895–1976), drove the Tibetans back to the Yangtze River and even threatened to attack Chamdo. At Batang, Kesang Tsering, a half-Tibetan, claiming to be acting on behalf of Chiang Kai-shek (Pinyin: Jiang Jieshi. 1887–1975), managed to evict Liu Wen-hui's governor from the town with the support of some local tribes. A powerful "freebooter Lama" from the region gained support from the Tibetan forces and occupied Batang, but later had to withdraw. By August 1932 the Tibetan government had lost so much territory the Dalai Lama telegraphed the Government of India asking for diplomatic assistance. By early 1934 a ceasefire and armistices had been arranged with Liu Wen-hui and Governor Ma of Chinghai in which the Tibetans gave up all territory to the east of the Yangtze (including the region of Batang) but kept control of the Yaklo (Yenchin) district which had previously been a Chinese enclave to the west of the river.

== Notable persons from Batang ==
- Bapa Phüntso Wangye
