= Tsewang Lhamo =

Queen of the Kingdom of Derge

Tsewang Lhamo (Tibetan: ཚེ་དབང་ལྷ་མོ་, Wylie: tshe dbang lha mo; died 1812) was the queen of the Kingdom of Derge. During her reign, she fostered the development of printing and publishing. Her life was documented by Getse Mahapandita, who served as her chaplain.

After the death of her husband Sawang Zangpo in 1790, Tsewang Lhamo became regent for her son; nevertheless, she soon exceeded the role of a regent and many contemporaneous sources portray her as a monarch in her own right. Certain histories, such as The History of Derge (sde dge’i lo rgyus), count her as the 17th ruler of Derge in the line of succession. Her son, Tsewang Dorje Rigdzin, succeeded her in either 1806 or 1808.
