= Chiefdom of Yao'an =

Bai Tusi chiefdom (1147–1729)

Chiefdom of Yao'an 姚安土司
- 1147–1729
- Status: Chiefdom under the suzerainty of the Dali Kingdom (1147–1253); Chiefdom within the Yuan, Ming and Qing dynasties (1253–1729)
- Capital: Yao'an (present day Yao'an County of Chuxiong Yi Autonomous Prefecture)
- Common languages: Bai language
- Government: Monarchy
- Chieftain
  - 1147–?: Gao Mingqing (first)
  - ?–1725: Gao Houde (last)
- History
  - Established: 1147
  - Disestablished: 1729
Preceded by	Succeeded by
Dali Kingdom	Qing dynasty
- Today part of: China

Chiefdom of Yao'an (Chinese: 姚安土司; pinyin: Yáo'ān Tǔsī), ruled by the Gao clan, was a Bai autonomous Tusi chiefdom during Yuan, Ming and Qing dynasties. The chiefdom was located at the convergence of modern-day Yunnan and Sichuan provinces.

The Gao clan were descendants of Gao Shengtai, who was the emperor of the short-lived Dazhong state which existed from 1094 to 1096. The Gao clan ruled Yao'an for more than 700 years, surviving several dynastic changes in China, until its last ruler Gao Houde was arrested by Qing Chinese in 1725. In 1729, Yao'an was fully annexed into the central bureaucratic system of the Qing dynasty.

== List of chieftains of Yao'an ==
Below are Yao'an chieftains:

Name	Chinese	Reign	Notes
Gao Mingqing	高明清	1147–?	son of Gao Taiming grandson of Gao Shengtai
Gao Yuchengsheng	高踰城生	?–?	son of Gao Mingqing
Gao Yuchengguang	高踰城光	?–?	
Gao Longzheng	高隆政	?–?	
Gao Zhengjun	高政均	?–?	
Gao Junming	高均明	?–?	
Gao Mingshou	高明壽	?–?	
Gao Shousi	高壽寺	?–?	
Gao Shoubao	高壽保	?–?	
Gao Xian	高賢	?–?	
Gao Gui	高貴	?–?	
Gao Xiang	高翔	?–?	
Gao Feng	高鳳	?–?	
Gao Qidou	高齊斗	?–?	
Gao Qin	高欽	?–?	
Gao Jinchen	高金宸	?–?	
Gao Guangyu	高光裕	?–?	son of Gao Jinchen
Gao Shoufan	高守藩	?–?	son of Gao Guangyu
Gao Tai	高𦒰	?–?	son of Gao Shoufan
Gao Wengying	高奣映	?–?	son of Gao Tai
Gao Yinghou	高映厚	?–?	son of Gao Wengying
Gao Houde	高厚德	?–1725	son of Gao Yinghou
