= Kingdom of Derge =

Tibetan kingdom in Kham

Coordinates: 31°49′N 98°40′E

Kingdom of Derge སྡེ་དགེ་
- 13th century–1956
- Capital: Dêgê
- Common languages: Khams Tibetan
- Government: Monarchy
- Derge Chogyal
  - 16??–16??: Lodro Tobden
  - 1790–1806/08: Tsewang Lhamo
  - 1897–1908: Doje Senkel
  - 1913–1919: Dorje Sengge
  - 1926–1942: Tsewang Dudul
  - 1942–1956: Jamyang Palmo
- Regent
  - 1919–1926: Eleventh Tai Situ, Pema Wangchok Gyelpo
- Governor
  - 1913–1928: Gyurme Gyatso Tethong
- History
  - Established: 13th century
  - Gombo Namgye Rebellion: 1853
  - Annexed by Qing China: 1908
  - Restored by Tibet: 1913
  - Tibetan Occupation: 1918
  - Kamtok Agreement: 1932
  - Incorporated into PR China: 1950
  - Land Reform Movement: 1956
| Succeeded by |
| China |
- Today part of: China

The Kingdom of Derge (Tibetan: སྡེ་དགེ་, Wylie: sde dge; Chinese: 德格王國) was a large kingdom in Kham, whose estate was founded in the 13th century by the Gar Clan of Sonam Rinchen in present-day Pelyul County. The Gar Clan traces its lineage to minister Gar Tongtsen at Songsten Gampo's 7th century court, and the kingdom lasted until the 20th century. After the 1630s, the Derge Kingdom became a major center of Tibetan culture, printing, industry, Tibetan Buddhism, and politics, and the seat of its kingdom was in the town of Degé. The kings of Derge belonged to the 1300-year old Gar Clan lineage,

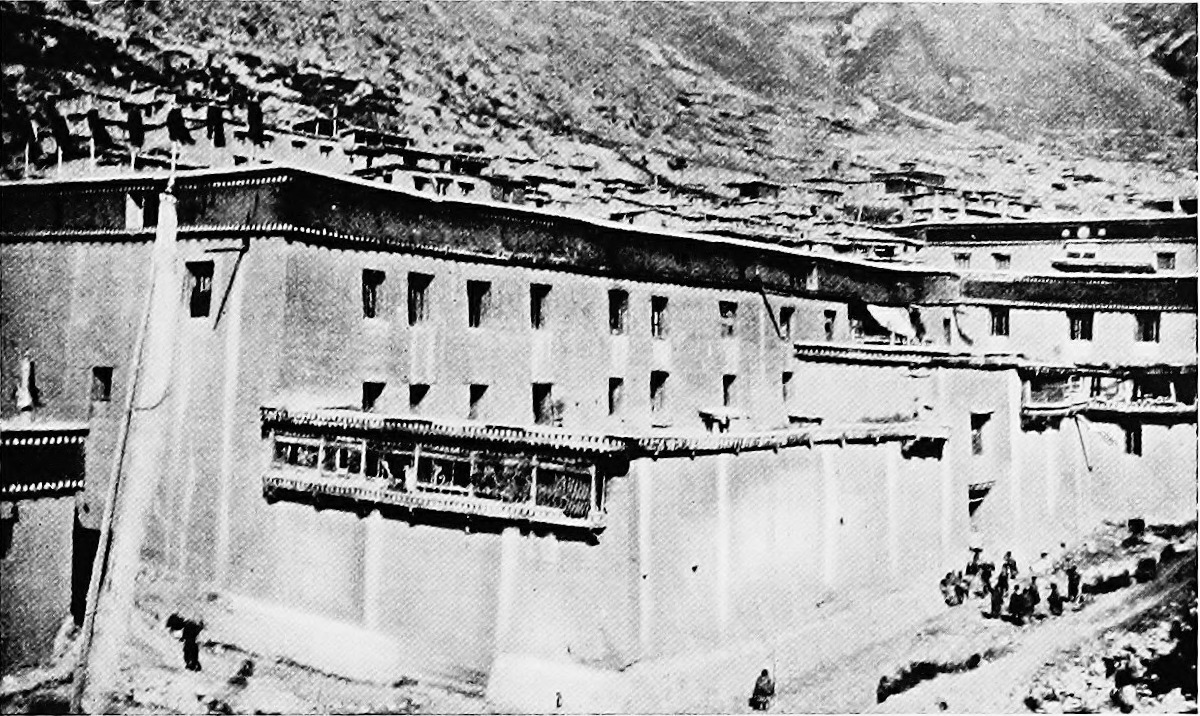
"CASTLE OF THE RAJAH OF DE-GE AT DE-GE GONCHEN" (original caption) from Eric Teichman's 1922 book, "Travels of a Consular Officer in Eastern Tibet: Together with a History of the Relations between China, Tibet and India"

At its height, the population of the kingdom consisted of 12–15,000 families.

The northern border of the kingdom was defined by Tso Ngon Lake; on the east, the boundary terminated at those states that utilized the Horpa variation of the Rgyalrongic languages, Chantui and Litang; the southern and western boundaries were defined by Batang, Sanai, Gonjo and Draya; and Lhato and Chamdo, respectively. During the Qing dynasty, a Derge king requested a Tusi title in 1728. The kingdom was known for its metal working and was an important center in the establishment of the Rimé movement in Tibetan Buddhism. The royal family of Derge were known as supporters of art, producing such artists as Situ Panchen, the kingdom's senior court chaplain, who is also known for his contributions to medicine and religion. Queen Tsewang Lhamo (d. 1812) was known for her support of the Nyingma school and for commissioning the printing its texts, including The Collected Tantras of the Nyingma.

== History ==
Degé became the capital of the kingdom in the 15th century under the reign of Lodro Tobden, the 31st in the line of the Derge kings. It was he who invited Thang Tong Gyalpo to establish the now renowned Gongchen Monastery in the region. The Derge dynasty adopted the title "Dharma King" (Chogyal in Tibetan; 法王 in Chinese) around 1640. The kingdom expanded during the 18th century under the reign of Tenpa Tsering, who conquered territories to the north. Two of the Dharma kings of Derge were females, Yangchen Drolma (r. 1774–1786) and Tsewang Lhamo (r. 1790–1806/08)

In the early 1900s, Eric R. Coales prepared a report that included information about the "recent" history of the kingdom for the British. According to Coales' report, in 1895, the Viceroy of Sichuan sent forces into Chantui, led by General Chang Chi, who advanced further into Derge. The king and his family were imprisoned in Chengdu. By the time political intrigue in China had forced the troops to withdraw, the king had died, leaving behind two sons, Doje Senkel and Djembel Rinch'en. The former of these enjoyed the support of the Chinese, but the latter, who may have been illegitimate, had backers in Chantui. The two struggled over the throne until 1908, when Doje Senkel appealed for assistance to the Chinese General Chao Eh-Feng, who was on military campaign in the area to secure the political primacy of China. Djembel Rinch'en was driven to take sanctuary with the Dalai Lama, Thubten Gyatso; Doje Senkel yielded the kingdom to China in exchange for an allowance. The Chinese retained direct control of Derge until 1918 when the Kingdom of Tibet would invade the Kham region and would occupy Derge. During the occupation of Derge, Dorje Sengee and his wife would be placed under house arrest, and Dorje Sengee would die in 1919 in Lhasa. Following Sengee's death, his son Tsewang Dudul would be appointed as his successor at the age of three, and granted the title of Taiji by the Tibetan government, while the Eleventh Tai Situ, Pema Wangchuk Gyelpo would be chosen by the Governor of Derge to serve as regent.

The palace of the Derge kings, located next to the Parkhang Monastery, was demolished after 1950 and a school was built on the site.
