= Zhao Erfeng =

Chinese official and bannerman (1845–1911)

Wuyong baturu Zhao Erfeng 趙爾豐
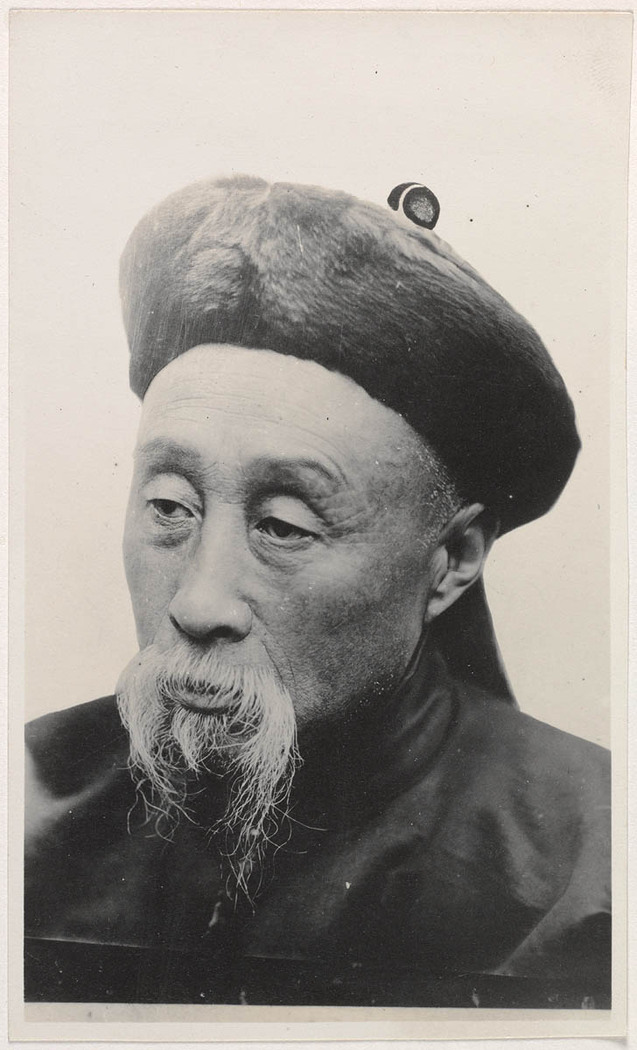
- Zhao Erfeng

Viceroy of Sichuan
- In office 21 April – 6 November 1911 (acting)
- Monarch: Xuantong Emperor
- Preceded by: Zhao Erxun
- Succeeded by: Position abolished

Assistant Amban of Tibet at Chamdo
- In office 1908–1911
- Monarch: Xuantong Emperor
- Preceded by: Feng Quan
- Succeeded by: Position abolished

Personal details
- Born: 1845 Fengtian, Qing China
- Died: 22 December 1911 (aged 65–66) Chengdu, Great Han Sichuan Military Government
- Cause of death: Decapitation
- Relations: Zhao Erxun (brother)
- Education: juren degree in the imperial examination
- Nickname(s): Butcher of Kham, Zhao the Butcher

Military service
- Allegiance: Qing Dynasty
- Unit: Eight Banners
- Battles/wars: 1905 Tibetan Rebellion, Chinese expedition to Tibet (1910), 1911 Tibetan Rebellion, Xinhai Revolution

Zhao Erfeng
- Traditional Chinese: 趙爾豊
- Simplified Chinese: 赵尔丰
Transcriptions
Standard Mandarin
- Hanyu Pinyin: Zhào Ěrfēng
- Wade–Giles: Chao Erh-feng

Jihe (courtesy name)
- Chinese: 季和
Transcriptions
Standard Mandarin
- Hanyu Pinyin: Jìhé
- Wade–Giles: Chi-ho

Zhao Erfeng (1845 - 22 December 1911), courtesy name Jihe, was a late Qing Dynasty official and Han Chinese bannerman who belonged to the Plain Blue Banner. He was an assistant amban in Tibet at Chamdo in Kham (eastern Tibet). He was appointed in March 1908 under Lien Yu, the main amban in Lhasa. Formerly Director-General of the Sichuan-Hubei Railway and acting viceroy of Sichuan province, Zhao was a much-maligned Chinese general of the late imperial era who led military campaigns throughout Kham, earning himself the nickname "the Butcher of Kham" and "Zhao the Butcher" (Chinese: 赵屠户). In 1911, Zhao was captured and executed by revolutionaries led by Yin Changheng during the Xinhai Revolution in Sichuan.

== Amban of Tibet ==
Zhao Erfeng crushed the Tibetan Lamas and their monasteries in the 1905 Tibetan Rebellion in Yunnan and Sichuan, he then crushed the rebels at the siege of Chantreng (now Xiangcheng County, Sichuan) which lasted from 1905 to 1906. The Tibetan Lamas had revolted against Qing rule, killing Chinese government officials, western Catholic Christian missionaries and native Christian converts, since the Tibetan Buddhist Gelug Yellow Hat sect was suspicious of the Christian missionary success.

Zhao Erfeng extended Chinese rule into Kham, and was appointed Amban in 1908. Zhao had successfully dismantled the powers of the tribal chieftains within the region of Kham. Initially he worked with the 13th Dalai Lama, who had returned after fleeing from the British expedition to Tibet. But in 1909, they disagreed with each other strongly and Zhao Erfeng drove the Dalai Lama into exile. The Dalai Lama was installed at the palace and monastery of Potala amid popular demonstrations. The ruler, who was again given civil power at the head of their hierarchy, pardoned all the Tibetans who had given an oath of loyalty to Colonel Francis Younghusband, the leader of the British expedition. Things went well for a month until the lama protested to the Chinese in charge of military affairs because of the excesses of the Chinese troops on the Sichuan frontier, where they were sacking the monasteries and killing the monks. This protest served to stir up the whole question of the status of Tibet. The Amban declared that it was a Chinese province, and said he would deal with the rebels as it pleased him to do.

Other questions of authority arose, and finally the Amban sent orders to 500 Chinese troops who were encamped on the outskirts of the capital, Lhasa.

In 1910, China's 'foreign' Manchu Ch'ing dynasty, in a decaying spasm of aggression, had sent two thousand troops under General Chao Er-feng across the border into Tibet. When they arrived in Lhasa they fired on the crowds who had turned out to greet them. On 12 February the 13th Dalai Lama fled towards India pursued by two hundred Chinese cavalrymen, and rode to Phari and then Yatung in the Chumbi Valley, where he was given protection in the Trade Agency...

A few companies composed of the Dalai Lama's followers were hastily enrolled under the name of 'golden soldiers'. They tried to resist the Chinese soldiers, but, being poorly armed, were quickly overwhelmed. Meanwhile, the Dalai Lama, with three of his ministers and sixty retainers, fled through a gate at the rear of the palace enclosure, and were fired upon as they escaped through the city.

In January 1908 the final instalment of the Tibetan indemnity was paid to Great Britain, and the Chumbi valley was evacuated. The Dalai Lama was now summoned to Peking, where he obtained the imperial authority to resume his administration in place of the provisional governors appointed as a result of the British mission. He retained in office the high officials then appointed, and pardoned all Tibetans who had assisted the mission. But in 1909 Chinese troops were sent to operate on the Sichuan frontier against certain insurgent lamas, whom they handled severely. When the Dalai Lama attempted to give orders that they should cease, the Chinese amban in Lhasa disputed his authority, and summoned the Chinese troops to enter the city. They did so, and the Dalai Lama fled to India in February 1910, staying at Darjeeling. Chinese troops followed him to the frontier, and he was deposed by imperial decree.

A former Tibetan Khampa soldier named Aten recounted Tibetan memories of Zhao, calling him "Butcher Feng", claiming that he: razed Batang monastery, ordered holy texts to be used by troops as shoeliners, and mass murdered Tibetans.

== Capture and death ==
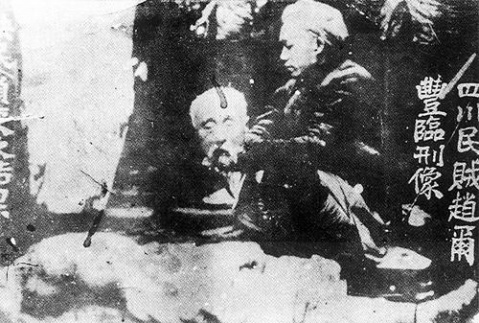
The execution of Zhao Erfeng

In 1911, Zhao Erfeng, then viceroy of Sichuan, faced rebellion in Sichuan. In May 1911, Qing officials agreed to European demands to rescind Sichuan province's ownership of a railroad concession and sold it to a European consortium. The sale infuriated gentry and merchants in Sichuan who lost considerable investments and resulted in the formation of a broad opposition movement, the Sichuan Railroad Recovery Movement.

On 7 September 1911, Zhao ordered the arrest of the Pu Diajun (the movement's leader and president of Sichuan's constitutional assembly), Luo Lun (president of Sichuan's student assembly), and others. At a protest on 8 September 1911, Zhao ordered soldiers to fire on the protestors, which they did, killing 26 people during the Bloody Chengdu Incident.

Authorities closed the Chengdu city gates and had them heavily guarded. Protestors created "water telegrams" by carving a message on to oiled boards, which were smuggled out and floated downriver:

Butcher Zhao arrested Pu and Luo,

Then massacred the Sichuan people.

In all places, friends, arise, save and protect your land!

Opposition fighters, primarily composed of Gelaohui militants, besieged Chengdu. On 18 and 19 September, Zhao's modernized New Army soldiers, armed with repeating weapons and artillery, pushed back the siege. Fighting continued in the area for two months.

Zhao summoned troops from Wuchang, leading rebels there to see it as an opportunity to rebel. This was the background to the Wuchang Uprising, the official start of the 1911 Revolution, and the diversion of troops to Sichuan was major factor in its success.

After battling the rebels on 22 December 1911 Zhao was captured and beheaded by Chinese Republican Revolutionary forces who were intent on overthrowing the Qing dynasty.

Before his death, Zhao attempted to convene frontier Qing troops on the Sichuan-Tibetan border to Chengdu. He himself, on the other hand, made compromises to the republican forces as if he would concede his power without violence. When the Qing reinforcement from Ya'an approached Chengdu, the head of the republican forces Yin Changheng ordered Zhao's execution.

Zhao Erfeng was the younger brother of Zhao Erxun, who was also an important figure in the final years of the Qing Empire.

== Controversies ==
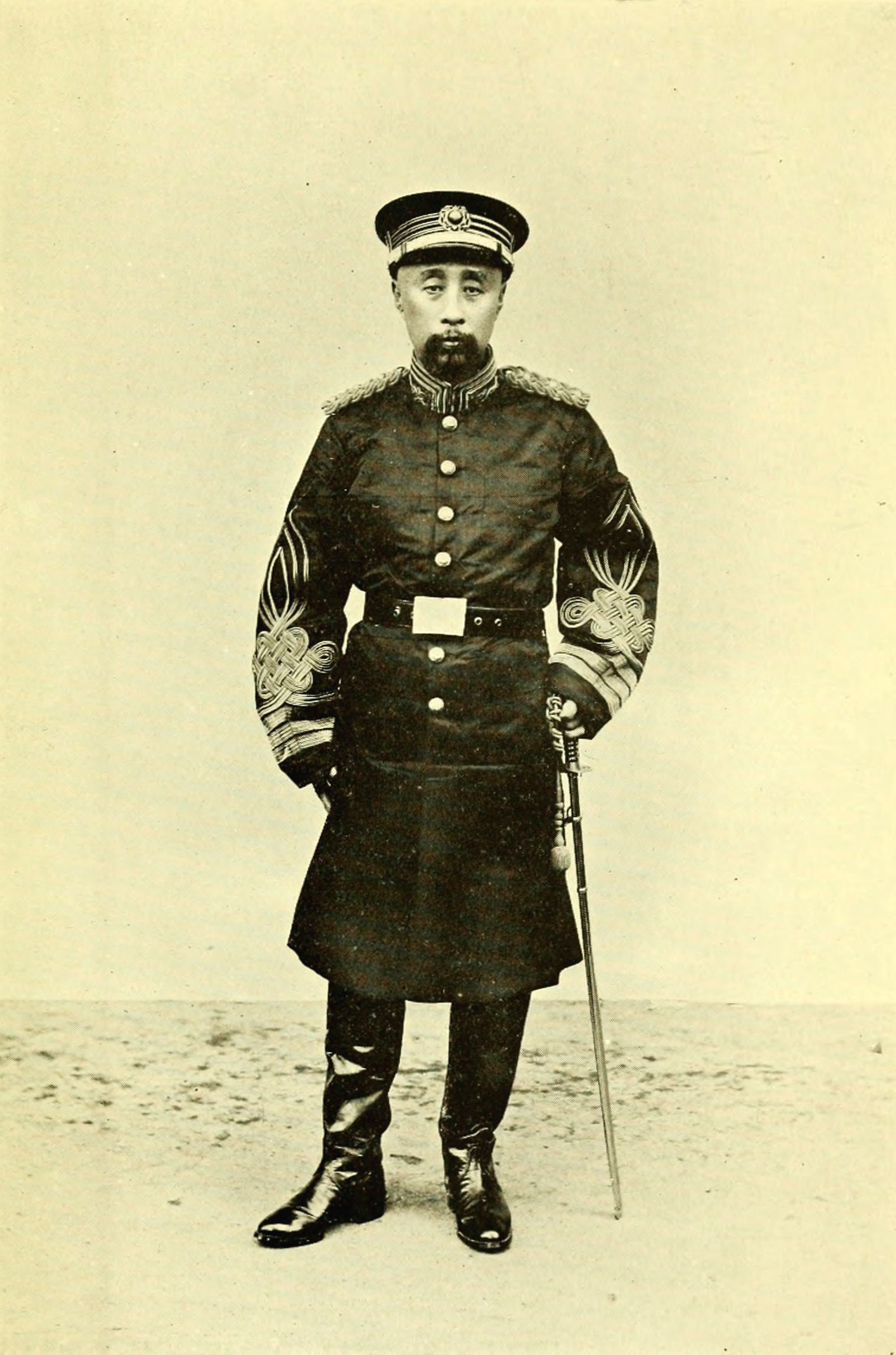
Zhao Erfeng

Zhao's ruthless rule was criticized by later generations. He played an antagonistic role during the Railway Protection Movement and the Miao rebellion in Yongning. Like in Tibet, he massacred unarmed civilians. Both Republic of China and People's Republic of China had fairly negative official comments about Zhao Erfeng, naming him a butcher and homicidal maniac.

Zhao's personal conviction was to transform the region of Kham into a province directly administrated by central government. He planned to unify Sichuan, Kham and Ü-Tsang into a single administrative district in order to counter British influence in the region as well as on the Dalai Lama. In Kham, Zhao employed the bureaucratization of native officers, more commonly known by its Chinese name of kai-t'u kuei-liu, which was a policy carried out by Later Ming dynasty and Qing dynasty depriving local native chieftains, or t'u-ssŭ of their political power. Consequently, an elimination of Tibetan native rulers in Batang and Litang was implemented. By the end of his Tibetan campaign, China was able to seize the region of Kham. However, the control established by Zhao was only temporary. After the fall of Qing dynasty, Tibetans regained the control of most of the lands conquered by Zhao Erfeng. In 1912, after Zhao's death, Chinese troops were removed from Tibet in the face of a Tibetan rebellion.

Some historians consider Zhao's Tibetan years as the first Chinese attempt to assimilate Tibet into a regular Chinese province. This means a removal of the Tibetan clergy class from their powerful status and a Han Chinese colonization of Tibet.

The aftermath of Zhao's Tibetan expedition caused the region of Kham to become a centre of Tibetan nationalism. In the following years, Lhasa's attempt of unifying Amdo, Kham and Ü-Tsang into a greater Tibet stagnated due to Kham's demand for more power in the Tibetan regime.

== See also ==
- Chinese expedition to Tibet (1910)
