= Hor States =

Five historical principalities in Kham, Tibet

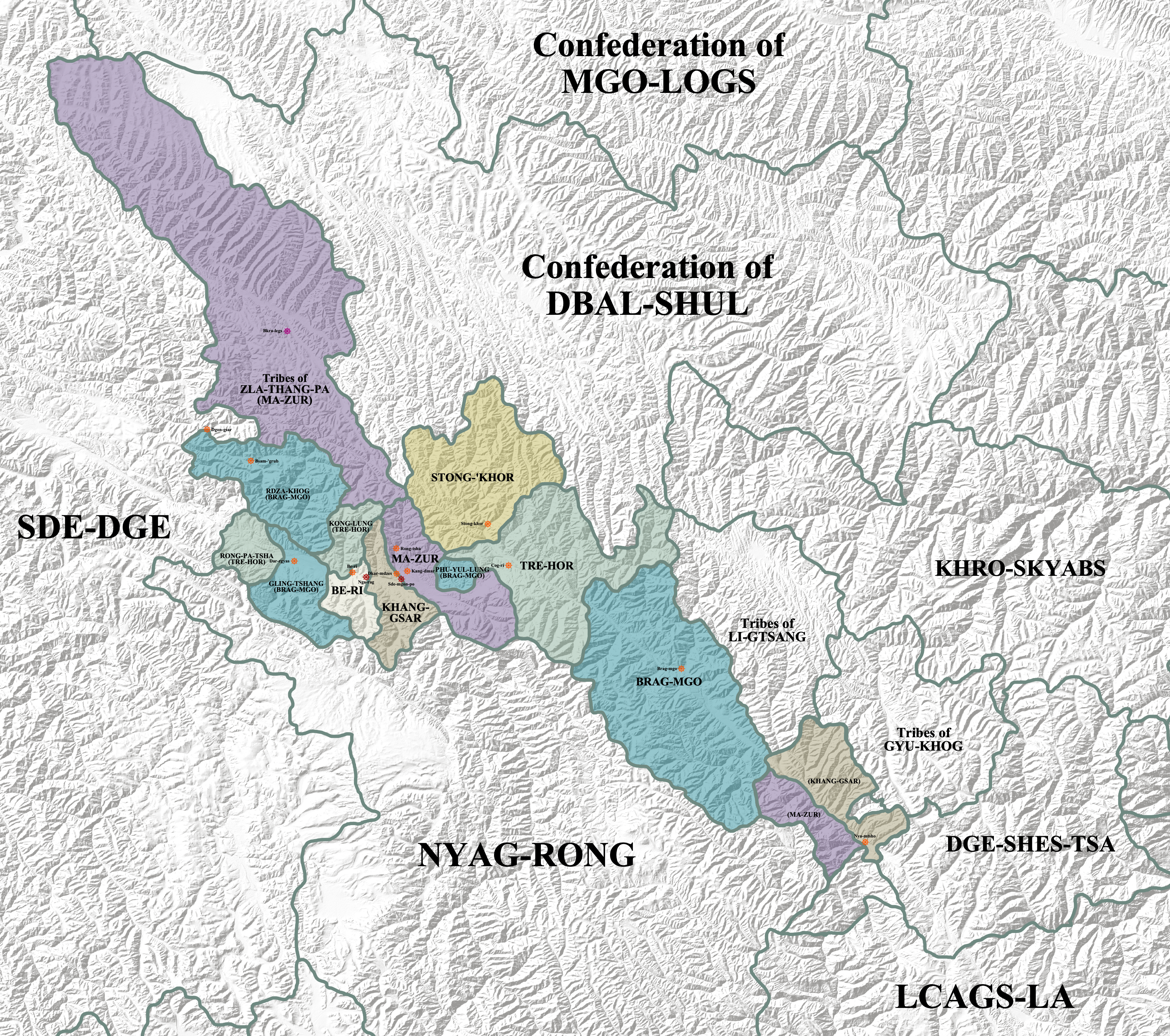
A map of the Kham Tibetan Hor States, circa. 1870.

The Hor States (Tibetan: ཧོར་དཔོན་ཁག་ལྔ།, Wylie: hor dpon khag lnga; Chinese: 五霍爾; lit. 'Five Hors'), also known as the Horpa States, were a group of principalities located in the Tibetan region of Kham that existed from the 14th century to the mid-1900s.

Today, the historical territory of the Hor States comprises Garzê County, Luhuo County, and part of Dawu County.

== Etymology ==
The name "Hor" is usually considered to be Turkic or Mongolic; because the Hor states were Tibetic in culture, their population is thought to be Mongols that were influenced by Tibetic culture.

== Geography ==
The Hor States located in the region traditionally called Tré or Tréshö (Tibetan: ཏྲེ་ཤོད།, Wylie: tre shod) in northern Kham on the upper portion of the Yalong River. Under the rule of the Hor States, the region also gained the names of Tréhor and Horkhok (Tibetan: ཧོར་ཁོག, Wylie: hor khog).

The traditional five states were:

Name of state	Tusi title	Capital	Now part of	Disbanded	Last ruler
Mazur མ་ཟུར ma zur	霍爾麻書安撫司; Anfusi of Huo'er Mashu	Mazur (present Kandze Town, Garzê County)	Garzê County	1951	Kunga Gyaltsen 貢嘎降澤 (fl. 1950)
Khangsar ཁང་གསར khang gsar	霍爾孔薩安撫司; Anfusi of Huo'er Kongsa	Khangsar (present Kandze Town, Garzê County)	Garzê County	1951	Yeshe Dorjé 益西多吉/孔薩益多 (1916 – 2010)
Trehor ཏྲེ་ཧོར tre hor	霍爾朱倭安撫司; Anfusi of Huo'er Zhuwo	Trehor (present Zhêhor Town, Luhuo County)	Luhuo County	1933	Jamyang Khyenrab Wangchuk 降央欽饒旺徐 (d. 1933)
Draggo བྲག་འགོ brag mgo	霍爾章谷安撫司; Anfusi of Huo'er Zhanggu	Draggo (present Xindu Town, Luhuo County)	Luhuo County	1899	Tashi Wanggyal 札喜旺甲 (d. 1899)
Beri བེ་རི be ri	霍爾白利安撫司; Anfusi of Huo'er Baili	Beri (present Sêrkar Township, Garzê County)	Garzê County	1951	Beri Wangdü 白利旺堆 (1925–1973)

The Chinese also included two other states as Hor States, but they were not included in the Tibetan list:

Name of state	Tusi title	Capital	Now part of	Disbanded	Last ruler
Dzakhok རྫ་ཁོག rdza khog	霍爾咱安撫司; Anfusi of Huo'er Zan	Dzakhok (present Zakog Township, Garzê County)	Garzê County	19th century	
Tongkor སྟོང་འཁོར stong vkhor	霍爾東科長官司; Zhangguansi of Huo'er Dongke	Tongkor (present Sitangda Township, Garzê County)	Garzê County	1951	Tsering Döndrub 赐儒登子 (fl. 1950)

== History ==
=== Early history ===
According to the rGya bod yig tshang, at the time of Trisong Detsen (755–797), there was an ancient kingdom in the lands of lDan, sGa and Tre bo, whose descendants founded the house of Sharkhapa in Gyantse. It may be identified as the Kingdom of Khrom of King Gesar. Another tradition claimed that in the same period, Tréshö was ruled by the clan of Achak Dru (Wylie: a lcags 'bru), centered in Draku (Wylie: brag u) within the modern Luhuo County (Wylie: brag mgo). In the 8th century, the Achak Dru ruler Trewo (Wylie: kre bo) patronized the great translator Cogro Lü Gyaltsen (Wylie: cog ro klu’i rgyal mtshan) to establish the first monastery in the region called Cogro Monastery (Wylie: cog ro dgon). It was later converted to Gelug and renamed as Cogri Monastery (Chinese: 覺日寺).

During the era of fragmentation, the area was notable as the birthplace of several religious figures, including the 1st Karmapa, Düsum Khyenpa (1110–1193), founder of the Karma Kagyu school of Tibetan Buddhism.

In the early 13th century, a member of the Achak Dru family, Trewo Alu (Wylie: tre bo a klu) travelled westwards to the area of Surmang. His son later founded the Kingdom of Nangchen.

=== Yuan and Ming Dynasties (13th–17th centuries) ===
In the 1260s, when Phagpa passed through the region, he visited the Cogri Monastery and was welcomed by Nyé ganden (Wylie: gnye dga' ldan), descendant of Trewo. Kublai Khan decided to send his son Horsé Gyalpo (Wylie: hor sras rgyal po) ("Mongol Prince") and the lama Ga Anyen Dampa (Wylie: sga a gnyan dam pa) to establish a monastery in this region, called the Dé Gönpo (Wylie: sde mgon po), later known as the "Chinese Chapel" (Wylie: rgya lha khang, (Chinese: 漢人寺).

During his stay, the Mongol prince had an affair with a local woman, giving birth to a son called Hor Namgyal (Wylie: hor rnam rgyal. Hor Namgyal subjugated the neighboring tribes of Khartsé Trung Tsang (Wylie: khar rtse khrung tshang), Naro Aru Tsang (Wylie: na ro a ru tshang), Kalak Kartra Tsang (Wylie: ka lag dkar bkra tshang), and Drongjang Shyangtsé Tsang, laying the foundations of the Hor States (Wylie: grong byang zhang rtse tshang).

In the early 8th Rabjung (1447–1506), the male line of the local clan of Achak Dru went into extinct. Namkha Gyaltsen (Wylie: nam mkha' rgyal mtshan), descendant of Hor Namgyal, arranged a marriage between his son Ngawang Drakpa and the daughter of the Achak Dru ruler, thus established a kingdom spanning from Dzakhok (Wylie: rdza khog) (within modern Garzê County) in the west to Draggo and Dawu in the east. After the death of Namkha Gyaltsen, the kingdom was partitioned among his sons, giving rise to the Hor States.

Namkha Gyaltsen had six sons:

- Wanglu (Wylie: dbang lu): son of the first wife Jamyang Palmo (Wylie: vjam dbyangs dpal mo), founder of Mazur. A branch of his descendants established the principality of Khangsar.
- Hor Chöjé Ngawang Püntsok (Wylie: hor chos rje ngag dbang phun tshogs): son of Jamyang Palmo, disciple of the 5th Dalai Lama
- Ngawang Drakpa (Wylie: ngag dbang grags pa): son of the second wife; also called Uching Noyön (Wylie: u cing no yon), founder of Trehor
- Abbot Ngawang Palzang (Wylie: mkhan po ngag dbang dpal bzang): son of the second wife
- Norbu (Wylie: nor bu): son of the third wife, founder of Draggo
- Unnamed son of the third wife

Beri, despite also included among the five Hor States, was generally not considered to be of Mongolian origin. Some claimed that it was founded by Döndrub Norbu (Wylie: don grub nor bu), a member of the ancient clan of Lhadong Beri (Wylie: lha ldong be ri). The clan was best known for the Beri King Dönyö Dorjé, who was defeated and executed by Güshi Khan in 1639.

Another tradition claimed that all five Hor States were founded by sons of Namkha Gyaltsen. His eldest son died falling off from horse during a pilgrimage, and was venerated as a deity called "Sharchok Dralha" (Wylie: (shar phyogs dgra lha). The second son stayed with his own mother, and his principality was known as "Mazur" ("beside mother"). The third son established a new house, so his principality was known as "Khangsar" ("new house"). The fourth son founded Trehor, the fifth son founded Draggo, and the sixth son founded Beri.

=== Qing Dynasty (17th–20th centuries) ===
In 1639, Güshi Khan conquered the Kingdom of Beri, ensuring the spread of the Gelugpa sect in Kham. Hor Chöjé, disciple of the 5th Dalai Lama, was said to have founded the Thirteen Hor Monasteries (Wylie: hor gyi dgon khag bcu gsum) in the region, including the Dargye Monastery; this connected them to the Ganden Podrang elite and amplified the region's prosperity.

In 1728, a few years after the Qing expedition to Tibet, the Hor states were formally bestowed titles of "Pacification Commissioners" (Anfusi, 安撫司).

In the mid 18th century, a war broke out between Khangsar and Mazur. Khangsar was allied with the Kingdom of Derge, the Gyalrong Kingdom of Geshitsa, and Upper and Middle Nyarong, while Mazur was allied with Chuchen and Trokyap. On September 26, 1755, forces of Derge captured Mazur, forcing the 12-year-old Mazur ruler Tendzin Wangpo into exile in Nyarong. In response, the Qing general Song Yuanjun led a force to Kandze and expelled the Derge troops. Song Yuanjun then summoned the chieftains to settle the dispute. The resolution was documented, that 11 Qing soldiers should be stationed at Mazur, and 10 soldiers at Jiaoluosi (角洛寺), a strategic pass between Dartsedo and Chuchen in the Geshitsa region.

In 1847, Gonpo Namgyal of Middle Nyarong unified the region of Nyarong and emerged as a new power in Kham. In the fourth month of 1848, forces of Khangsar, Mazur, Trehor, Draggo, Derge, Chakla and Lithang allied against Gonpo Namgyal, but eventually suffered a tough defeat and were forced to retreat. After this victory, Gonpo Namgyal gradually subdued the neighboring states. Gonpo Namgyal first conquered Draggo, then sieged the fortresses of Mazur and Khangsar in 1859. By 1860, Gonpo Namgyal completely occupied the Hor States. After the joint troops of Qing and Ganden Phodrang defeated Gonpo Namgyal in 1865, the Hor States were restored, and a Lhasa-appointed official was stationed in Nyarong.

The official in Nyarong provided means for Lhasa to directly intervene in Kham, which led to increasing tension between Lhasa and Qing officials. In 1883, a dispute arise when the Draggo ruler Wangchen Dradul decided to have his son married to the daughter of the Trokyap ruler, instead of Trehor. Trehor allied with Khangsar and Beri to attack Draggo, which had the support of Mazur and the Lhasa official in Nyarong. When Trehor forces besieged the Draggo residence, Qing Chinese troops intervened to stop the conflict.

Wangchen Dradul of Draggo died in 1893. Despite intentions to be succeeded by his younger son, his elder son Tashi Wanggyal seized the throne. Previously, Tashi Wanggyal was adopted by the Mazur family and already gained the throne of Mazur, thus uniting the two crowns. Draggo soon attacked and defeated Trehor. This time, Draggo was supported by Mazur, Chakla, Beri, Khangsar, as well as the Qing Dynasty, while Trehor was supported by the Lhasa official in Nyarong.

The Sichuan governor general Lu Chuanlin strongly advocated to expel the Lhasa official in Nyarong, in order to establish direct Chinese rule in Kham. He sent forces to take over Nyarong, Trehor and Draggo in 1896, but he was forced to abort his centralization plans by higher authorities upon the petition of the 13th Dalai Lama.

In the early 1900s, Zhao Erfeng began another series of centralization reforms in Kham. In April 1911, he revoked the Tusi titles and seals of all Hor rulers, but further centralisation reforms were halted due to the breakout of the Xinhai Revolution.

=== Republic of China (1912-1949) ===
During the republican era, the former land of the Hor States was governed by Han Chinese officials under the Ganzi, Luhuo and Daofu Counties, but beyond the county seats, four among the five Hor States continued to exist with certain extent of autonomy, except for Draggo, which was disintegrated after the death of Tashi Wanggyal in 1899.

Dekyi Lhatso (c. 1880–1933), consort of the previous ruler of Trehor, continued to share power with her nephew Jamyang Khyenrab Wangchuk (d. 1933). Ngödrub Tendzin Jikme (1887 – 1924), ruler of Khangsar, established a personal union with Mazur and Beri after their rulers died heirless, while securing a marriage alliance with Hor Tongkor. However, he also died without male heir, and was succeeded by his 7-year-old daughter with the Beri princess, Dechen Wangmo. Beri regained independence soon afterwards, enthroning a bastard son of the Beri princess called Wangdü.

Meanwhile, the Hor States became a critical frontline of the Sino-Tibetan border. In 1917, a battle in Riwoche triggered the First Kham-Tibet dispute (1917–1918). Tibetan troops gradually captured important towns on the western shore of the Jinsha river, and advanced towards the Chinese garrison in Rongbatsa, near the Dargye Monastery, one of the Thirteen Hor Monasteries. A ceasefire was achieved such that the Chinese troops should withdraw to Kandze. Sershul, Derge, Palyul came under Ganden Phodrang control, while the Hor States remain under Chinese jurisdiction.

Tension again escalated in 1930, with the occurrence of the Dargye-Beri Incident (大白事件). In the early summer, a conflict occurred between the Beri Monastery, patronized by the Hor Beri ruler, and the Ngarak Monastery (Wylie: nga rag dgon), another monastery under Beri jurisdiction supported by the Dargye Monastery. The militants of the Dargye Monastery quickly occupied a large portion of Beri territory, and the Beri ruler asked for support from the Sichuan warlord Liu Wenhui. In turn, the Ganden Phodrang intervened, sending an army under Khémé Sönam Wangdü to occupy Kandze and Nyarong. The Chinese army eventually defeated the Tibetan forces, and sieged Dargye Monastery in July 1932. The Ganden Phodrang thus lost the region on the eastern bank of the Jinsha River.

During the conflict, the Trehor Ruler Jamyang Khyenrab Wangchuk provided military support to the Ganden Phodrang. In fear of persecution by the Kuomintang, he travelled to Lhasa in August 1931, but eventually returned to Trehor in 1933. In the 28th of the ninth month of the Tibetan calendar, a Kuomintang force of two hundred sacked Trehor and beheaded the Trehor ruler. Dekyi Lhatso, his maternal aunt and regent, died in captivity a few days later. A Chinese commissioner was appointed to govern Trehor.

In 1936, during the Long March, the Chinese Red Army established the short-lived Tibetan People's Republic in Kandze. Dechen Wangmo, ruler of Khangsar, alongside her half-brother Wangdü, ruler of Beri, were elected to be Vice Chairperson of the Republic. In 1938, forces of Liu Wenhui sieged Khangsar and placed Dechen Wangmo under home arrest. In the next year, with Kuomintang support, the Mazur headman Jamyang Tsenpo (降雍澤辟) broke free from Khangsar and became the ruler of Mazur. Dechen Wangmo escaped to Qinghai in 1940, and only returned to Khangsar in 1948. Her husband Yeshe Dorjé became the last ruler of Khangsar.

=== Since 1949 ===
After 1949, major leaders of the Hor States, including Yeshe Dorjé of Khangsar and Wangdü of Beri, were granted significant government positions in the administration of Kandze. Small scale rebellions continued to break out in the Kandze county for some years, until the final rebels were crushed on 11 October 1971.

Early rulers of Hor
No.	Name (Lifespan)	Tibetan Wylie transliteration	Notes
1.	Hor Namgyal (fl. 13th century)	ཧོར་རྣམ་རྒྱལ hor rnam rgyal	Son of Horsé Gyalpo, a son of Kublai Khan according to folklore.
2.	Hor Aché	ཧོར་ཨ་ཅེ hor a ce	
3.	Bugégyé	བུ་དགེ་རྒྱས bu dge rgyas	
4.	Lamé Kyab	བླ་མས་སྐྱབས bla mas skyabs	
5.	Namkha Lozang	ནམ་མཁའ་བློ་བཟང nam mkha' blo bzang	
6.	Namkha Gyaltsen (fl. 1480)	ནམ་མཁའ་རྒྱལ་མཚན nam mkha' rgyal mtshan	After his death, the Hor State was partitioned among his sons.

== Hor Mazur ==
Pön of Hor Mazur
No.	Name (Lifespan)	Tibetan Wylie transliteration	Notes
1.	Wanglu (fl. 1540)	དབང་ལུ dbang lu	Son of Namkha Gyaltsen.
	?Tendzin Wangpo (1743-1774)(Chinese: 丹津旺溥)	བསྟན་འཛིན་དབང་པོ bstan 'dzin dbang po	Succeeded at a young age. In 1755, he was involved in a war with Khangsar, and was forced into exile in Nyarong. Mazur was briefly occupied by forces of Khangsar's ally Derge, until being expelled by Qing forces.
	?Namkha Wangyal (Chinese: 那木卡旺扎)	ནམ་མཁའ་དབང་རྒྱལ nam mkha' dbang rgyal	Son of Tendzin Wangpo.
	Trotruk (fl. 1850)	ཁྲོ་ཕྲུག khro phrug	
	Sönam Dorjé	བསོད་ནམས་རྡོ་རྗེ bsod nams rdo rje	
	Tashi Wanggyal (d. 1899)	བཀྲ་ཤིས་དབང་རྒྱལ bkra shis dbang rgyal	Son of Draggo ruler Wangchen Dradul and sister of the Khangsar ruler. Before his father's death, he was adopted by the Mazur family and already succeeded to the throne of Mazur. After his father's death, he defeated his younger brother and controlled Draggo. After being assassinated in 1899, Mazur was succeeded by his son-in-law and ruler of Khangsar, Ngödrub Tendzin Jikme, while Draggo became partitioned among local headmen.
	?Jamyang Tsenpo (fl. 1939)(Chinese: 降雍澤辟)	འཇམ་དབྱངས་བཙན་པོ vjam dbyangs btsan po'	Headman of Mazur under Khangsar rule. In 1939, after the Khangsar ruler Dechen Wangmo was placed under home arrest by Liu Wenhui, Jamyang Tsenpo broke free from Khangsar to become the ruler of Mazur.
	?Kunga Gyaltsen (fl. 1950)(Chinese: 貢嘎降澤)	ཀུན་དགའ་རྒྱལ་མཚན kun dgav rgyal mtshan	Son of Jamyang Tsenpo.

== Hor Khangsar ==
Pön of Hor Khangsar
No.	Name (Lifespan)	Tibetan Wylie transliteration	Notes
1.	Dorjé Rabten (fl. 1750)	རྡོ་རྗེ་རབ་བརྟན rdo rje rab brtan	Visited Lhasa to pay homage to the 7th Dalai Lama, and invited the 1st Reting Rinpoche, Ngawang Chokden to Kandze.
2.	Tendzin	བསྟན་འཛིན bstan 'dzin	
3.	Gyaltsen Rabten	རྒྱལ་མཚན་རབ་བརྟན rgyal mtshan rab brtan	
4.	Sönam Chöden	བསོད་ནམས་ཆོས་ལྡན bsod nams chos ldan	
5.	Kalzang Dargyé	སྐལ་བཟང་དར་རྒྱས skal bzang dar rgyas	Son of a female servant, succeeded his father at a young age. Went on pilgrimage to various holy sites in Tibet and Nepal, and established the Kandze Monastery after his return. His second son Lozang Tsultrim (Wylie: blo bzang tshul khrims) was among the candidates of the 11th Dalai Lama but was not selected, and returned to Kandze in October 1858 to start a lineage of incarnation lamas.
6.	Ngödrub Püntsok	དངོས་གྲུབ་ཕུན་ཚོགས dngos grub phun tshogs	Married a princess of the Kingdom of Derge, who failed to produce offspring. Succeeded by Yangchen Khandro, his bastard daughter with a Derge noblewoman. Fled to Tibet after Khangsar was conquered by Gonpo Namgyal.
7.	Yangchen Khandro (1854 – 1935)	དབྱངས་ཅན་མཁའ་འགྲོ dbyangs can mkha' 'gro	Bastard daughter of Ngödrub Püntsok.
8.	Ngödrub Tendzin Jikme (1887 – 1924)	དངོས་གྲུབ་བསྟན་འཛིན་འཇིགས་མེད dngos grub bstan 'dzin 'jigs med	Son of Yangchen Khandro. His first wife was the daughter of Tashi Wanggyal, ruler of Mazur. After the assassination of Tashi Wanggyal in 1899, he gained the realm of Mazur. After the death of his first wife, he married Balong (巴龍), daughter of the Beri ruler. After the Beri ruler died heirless, he succeeded to the throne of Beri as well, thus uniting the principalities of Khangsar, Mazur and Beri.
9.	Dechen Wangmo (1917 – 1951)	བདེ་ཆེན་དབང་མོ bde chen dbang mo	Daughter of Ngödrub Tendzin Jikme.
10.	Yeshe Dorjé (1916 – 2010)	ཡེ་ཤེས་རྡོ་རྗེ ye shes rdo rje	Husband of Dechen Wangmo. Became vice chairman of the Sichuan Provincial Committee of the Chinese People's Political Consultative Conference in 1991.

== Trehor ==
Pön of Trehor
No.	Name (Lifespan)	Tibetan Wylie transliteration	Notes
1.	Ngawang Drakpa (fl. 1540)	ངག་དབང་གྲགས་པ ngag dbang grags pa	Son of Namkha Gyaltsen. His bad-tempered eldest son Tutob Wangchuk (mthu stobs dbang phyug) died early and was venerated as a wrathful deity. He was succeeded by his second son Trinlé Namgyal.
2.	Trinlé Namgyal	ཕྲིན་ལས་རྣམ་རྒྱལ phrin las rnam rgyal	
3.	Miwang Tsering Döndrub	མི་དབང་ཚེ་རིང་དོན་གྲུབ mi dbang tshe ring don grub	
4.	Lhasé Gendün Bum	ལྷ་སྲས་དགེ་འདུན་འབུམ lha sras dge 'dun 'bum	Married the daughter of the Gyalrong Tsakho ruler.
5.	Sengé Nyima Gyaltsen	སེང་གེ་ཉི་མ་རྒྱལ་མཚན seng ge nyi ma rgyal mtshan	
6.	Miwang Sönam Dargyé	མི་དབང་བསོད་ནམས་དར་རྒྱས mi dbang bsod nams dar rgyas	Co-ruled with his brother Sönam Püntsok (bsod nams phun tshogs). Defeated the forces of Trokyap. Also fought Tongkor in a border conflict.
7.	Losal Gyatso (d. 1865)	བློ་གསལ་རྒྱ་མཚོ blo gsal rgya mtsho	His first marriage was with Tamdrin Drolma (rta mgrin sgrol ma), the daughter of Gonpo Namgyal, but failed to produce an heir. He later married Namgyal Drolma (rnam rgyal sgrol ma) of the Derge royal family, and had two sons. He died fighting on Gonpo Namgyal's side against the Ganden Phodrang.
8.	Chimé Kalzang Gönpo	འཆི་མེད་བསྐལ་བཟང་མགོན་པོ 'chi med bskal bzang mgon po	Succeeded his father at a young age. Married Dekyi Lhatso (bde skyid lha mtsho), daughter of Dünkor Gyakhar (mdun skor rgya mkhar) of Derge. Died heirless.
9.	Ngödrub Tenkyong Wangpo	དངོས་གྲུབ་བསྟན་སྐྱོང་དབང་པོ dngos grub bstan skyong dbang po	Younger brother of Chimé Kalzang Gönpo. Initially a monk, suspended his monastic vows to succeed the throne after his brother died heirless. He married his brother's consort Dekyi Lhatso. Died heirless, ending the Trehor bloodline.
10.	Jamyang Khyenrab Wangchuk (d. 1933)	འཇམ་དབྱངས་མཁྱེན་རབ་དབང་ཕྱུག 'jam dbyangs mkhyen rab dbang phyug	After the extinction of the Trehor bloodline, the Queen Dekyi Lhatso installed her brother's son Jamyang Khyenrab Wangchuk on throne. He married a daughter of the ruler of Chakla. Together with Dekyi Lhatso, he was captured and executed by Kuomintang forces in the winter of 1933.

== Hor Draggo ==
Pön of Hor Draggo
No.	Name (Lifespan)	Tibetan Wylie transliteration	Notes
1.	Norbu (fl. 1540)	ནོར་བུ nor bu	Son of Namkha Gyaltsen.
2.	Mugeni (Chinese: 木格尼)	?	
3.	Haxuqing (Chinese: 哈須清)	?	
4.	Haxuha (Chinese: 哈須哈)	?	
5.	Lozang Tsewang	བློ་བཟང་ཚེ་དབང blo bzang tshe dbang	
6.	Yabchen Könchok Samdrub (fl. 1600)	ཡབ་ཆེན་དཀོན་མཆོག་བསམ་འགྲུབ yab chen dkon mchog bsam 'grub	Some sources mentioned Yabchen Könchok Samdrub as son of Norbu, omitting the 2-5th generations.
7.	Drinjé Tséten Norbu (fl. 1650)	དྲིན་རྗེ་ཚེ་བརྟན་ནོར་བུ drin rje tshe brtan nor bu	Tséten Norbu's reign marked the zenith of the Principality of Draggo. He converted from Bon to Buddhism, and patronized the foundation of the Gelugpa Draggo Monastery in 1650. He paid homage to the 5th Dalai Lama and the Qing Emperor. His wife was Tséten Lhamo, younger sister of the ruler of Trokyap. His younger sister was married to the ruler of Beri.
8.	Wanggyal Tséten (fl. 1710)	དབང་རྒྱལ་ཚེ་བརྟན dbang rgyal tshe brtan	
9.	? (d. 1863)		Mentioned as elder brother of Dingjue (頂覺) in Chinese sources. Died without male heir during war with Gonpo Namgyal of Nyarong.
10.	？Gyaltsen Wangchuk (Chinese: 甲木參讓竹)		Son-in-law of the previous ruler. Son of the ruler of Chakla. Died heirless.
11.	Wangchen Dradul (d. 1892)	དབང་ཆེན་དགྲ་འདུལ dbang chen dgra 'dul	Son of the Mazur ruler Sönam Dorjé. In 1883, he married the daughter of the previous Draggo ruler. Soon after, his father-in-law died and he succeeded the throne. His second marriage was with the sister of the Khangsar ruler.
12.	Tashi Wanggyal (d. 1899)	བཀྲ་ཤིས་དབང་རྒྱལ bkra shis dbang rgyal	Son of Draggo ruler Wangchen Dradul and sister of the Khangsar ruler. Before his father's death, he was adopted by the Mazur family and already succeeded to the throne of Mazur. After his father's death, he defeated his younger brother and controlled Draggo. After being assassinated in 1899, Mazur was succeeded by his son-in-law and ruler of Khangsar, Ngödrub Tendzin Jikme, while Draggo became partitioned among local headmen.

== Hor Beri ==
Pön of Hor Beri
No.	Name (Lifespan)	Tibetan Wylie transliteration	Notes
	Döndrub Norbu	དོན་གྲུབ་ནོར་བུ don grub nor bu	
	？Wangpo Tutob (1866-after 1917) (Chinese: 萬博讀兌)	དབང་པོ་མཐུ་སྟོབས dbang po mthu stobs	51-year-old when visited by the British officer Oliver R. Coales in 1917. He died without male heir, leaving Beri to the Khangsar ruler Ngödrub Tendzin Jikme, who married his daughter Balong (巴龍).
	？Beri Wangdü (1925-1973) (Chinese: 白利旺堆)	བེ་རི་དབང་འདུས be ri dbang 'dus	The previous Beri ruler died without male heir, leaving a daughter called Balong (巴龍), married to the Khangsar ruler Ngödrub Tendzin Jikme. After Jikme's death, Balong gave birth to a bastard son called Wangdü, who later became the ruler of Beri. His wife was Haga (哈呷), daughter of Döndrub Namgyal (Chinese: 鄧珠郎傑/鄧德傑) (1898–1956), a headman of Beri. In 1951, he was appointed as Vice County Magistrate of Kandze.

== See also ==
- Horpa language
