= Ganzi =

Ganzi may refer to:

- Ganzi, Gabon, town in Gabon
- Ganzi, South Sudan, village/town in South Sudan
- Ganzi Tibetan Autonomous Prefecture, prefecture in Sichuan, China
- Ganzi County, county in Garzê Tibetan Autonomous Prefecture
- Garzê Town, a town in the Garzê Tibetan Autonomous Prefecture
- Marc Ganzi, an American businessman and polo player.
- Ganzi, a song by Jae the Kid.
