= Garzê =

Garzê may refer to:

- Garzê Tibetan Autonomous Prefecture, in Sichuan, China
- Garzê Town, the main town in the prefecture
- Garzê County, in Sichuan, China
