= List of cultural regions of Tibet =

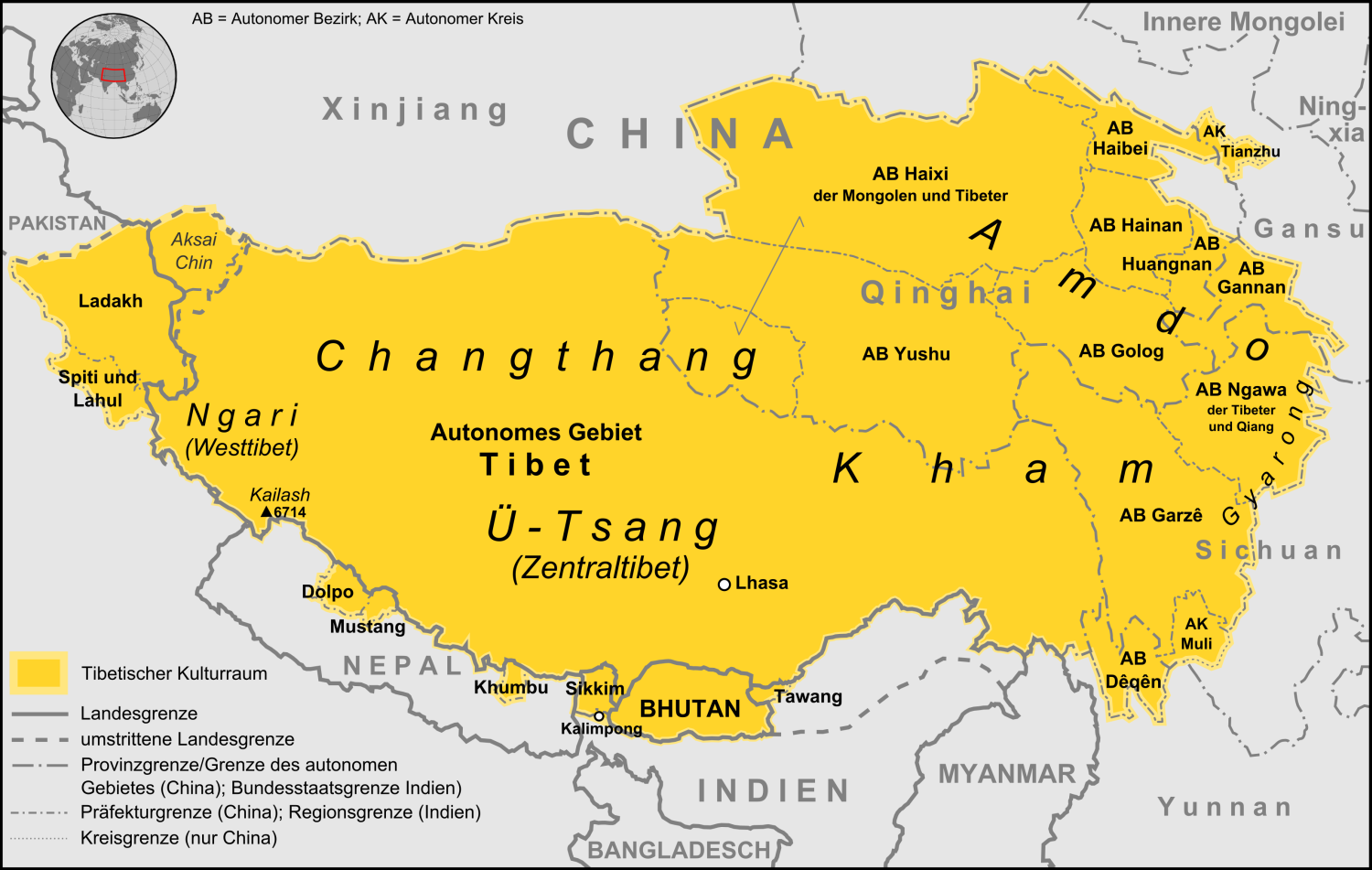
Regions of Tibet

Traditional and cultural regions of Greater Tibet encompass the present-day territories in Tibetan Autonomous Region and parts of Qinghai, Sichuan, Yunnan and Gansu in China, plus the country of Bhutan and parts of territory controlled by Nepal and India:

== List ==
=== Central Tibet (Ü-Tsang) ===
==== Tsang ====
- Latö (Wylie: la stod) (Tibetan: ལ་སྟོད། )
- Tsang (Wylie: gtsang) (Tibetan: གཙང་། )

==== Ü ====
- Dakpo (Wylie: dwags po) (Tibetan: དྭགས་པོ། )
- Kongpo (Wylie: kong po) (Tibetan: ཀོང་པོ། )
- Lhasa (Wylie: lha sa) (Tibetan: ལྷ་ས། )
- Lhokha (Wylie: lho kha) (Tibetan: ལྷོ་ཁ། )

=== Eastern/northeastern Tibet (Dokham) ===
==== Amdo ====
- Labrang (Tibetan: བླ་བྲང་། )
- Repgong (Tibetan: རེབ་གོང་ )
- Sharwa and Teto (Tibetan: ཤར་བ་དང་མཐེ་བོ། )

==== Kham ====
- Batang (Tibetan: བའ་ཐང་། )
- Chamdo (Tibetan: ཆབ་མདོ། )
- Dartsendo (Tibetan: མདའ་རྩེ་མདོ། )
- Degé (Tibetan: སྡེ་དགེ )
- Dêqên (Tibetan: བདེ་ཆེན )
- Drakyap (Wylie: brag g.yab ) (Tibetan: བྲག་གཡབ། )
- Litang (Tibetan: ལི་ཐང་། )
- Nangchen (Tibetan: ནང་ཆེན། )
- Nyakrong (Tibetan: ཉག་རོང་། )
- Pelyül (Tibetan: དཔལ་ཡུལ། )
- Powo (Wylie: spo bo) (Tibetan: སྤོ་བོ )
- Riwoché (Tibetan: རི་བོ་ཆེ། )
- Kyegundo/Yushu (Tibetan: སྐྱེ་རྒུ་མདོ། ཡུལ་ཤུལ། )

==== Other regions ====
- Golok (Tibetan: མགོ་ལོག )
- Gyalrong (Tibetan: རྒྱལ་རོང་། )
- Hor (Tibetan: ཧོར། )

=== Northern Tibet ===
- Jangtang (Tibetan: བྱང་ཐང་། )

=== Southern Tibet ===
- Bhutan (Drukyül) (Wylie: 'brug) (Tibetan: འབྲུག་ཡུལ། )
- Dolpo (Tibetan: དོལ་པོ། )
- Gungtang (Tibetan: གུང་ཐང་། )
- Kyirong (Tibetan: སྐྱིད་གྲོང་། )
- Lahul (Tibetan: ལ་ཧུལ། )
- Lhodrak (Tibetan: ལྷོ་བྲག )
- Monyül (Tibetan: མོན་ཡུལ། )
- Mustang (Tibetan: གློ་སྨན་ཐང་། )
- Pemako/Mêdog (Tibetan: པདྨ་བཀོད། )
- Sherpa (Tibetan: ཤར་པ། )
- Yolmo/Helambu (Tibetan: ཡོལ་མོ། )
- Zayül (Tibetan: རྫ་ཡུལ། )

=== Western Tibet ===
- Baltistan (Tibetan: སྦལ་ཏི། )
- Ladakh (Tibetan: ལ་དྭགས། )
- Mangyül (Tibetan: མང་ཡུལ། )
- Ngari (Tibetan: མངའ་རིས། )
- Porong (Tibetan: སྤོ་རོང་། )
- Spiti (Tibetan: སྤི་ཏི། )
- Zanskar (Tibetan: ཟངས་དཀར། )
