= Den Monastery =

Tibetan Buddhist monastery in Sichuan, China

Religion
- Affiliation: Tibetan Buddhism

Location
- Location: Sichuan, China
- Country: China

Den Monastery is a small Buddhist monastery in Ganzi, Sichuan, China.
