= Dargye Monastery =

Tibetan Buddhist monastery in Sichuan, China

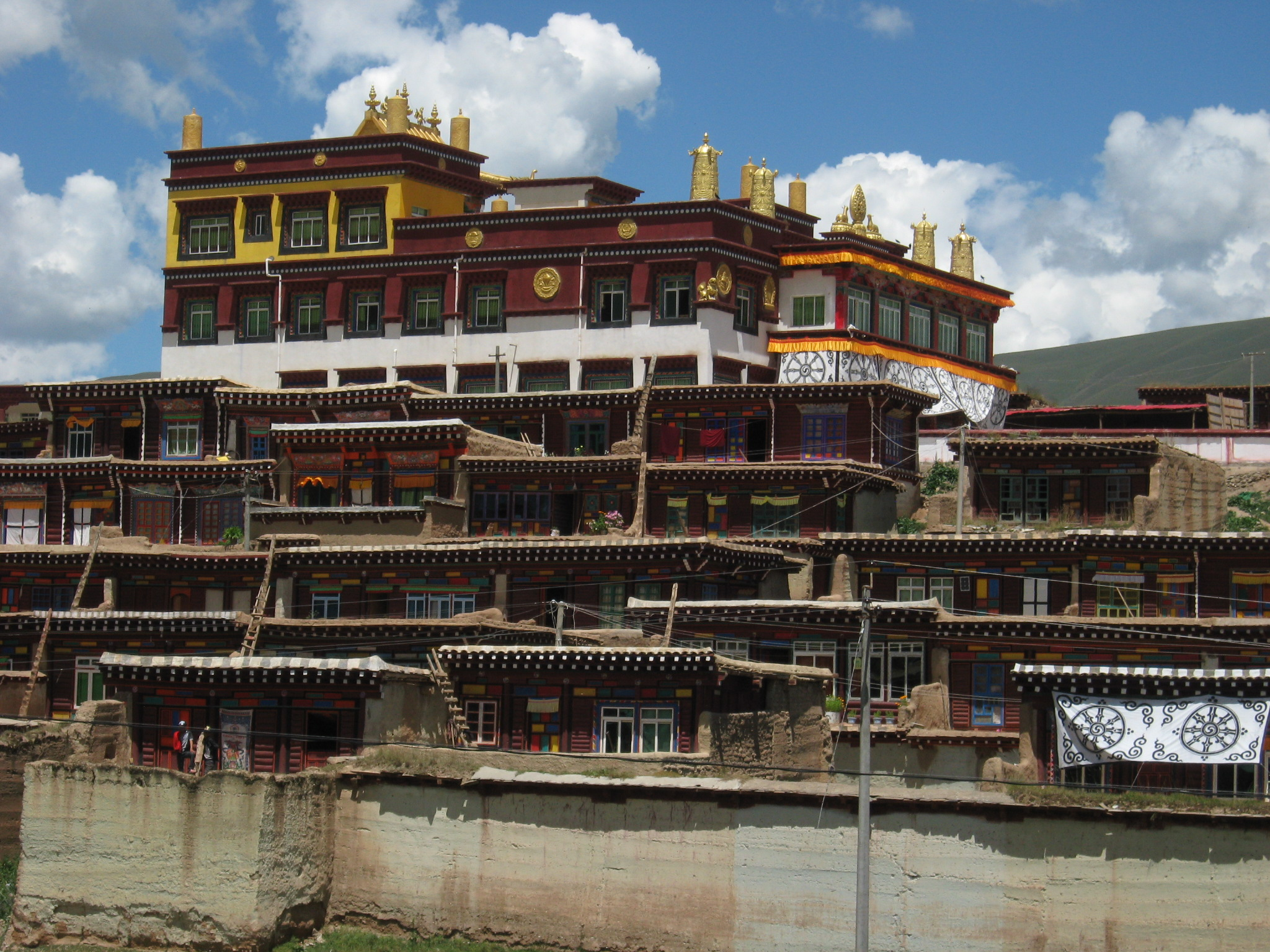

Religion
- Affiliation: Tibetan Buddhism
- Sect: Gelug

Location
- Location: Garzê Tibetan Autonomous Prefecture, Kham, China
- Country: China
- Interactive map of Dargye Monastery

Architecture
- Founder: Jedrung Sherab Wangpo
- Established: 1642

Dargye Monastery (Tibetan: དར་རྒྱས་དགོན།, Wylie: dar rgyas dgon; Chinese: 大金寺; pinyin: Dàjīn Sì) is a Buddhist monastery in Garzê Tibetan Autonomous Prefecture, Kham, Sichuan, China. It belongs to the Gelug school of Tibetan Buddhism. The monastery was founded in the late seventeenth century by the First Hor Choje, Ngawang Puntsok, near Kandze.
