= Northwestern Federation of the Chinese Soviet Republic =

Chinese confederation

Northwestern Federation of the Chinese Soviet Republic 中华苏维埃共和国西北联邦 Zhōnghuá sūwéi'āi gònghéguó xīběi liánbāng
- 1935–1936
- Flag Emblem
- Motto: 全世界無產階級和被壓迫的民族聯合起來！ "Quánshìjiè wúchǎnjiējí hé bèi yāpò de mínzú liánhé qǐlai!" "Proletariats and oppressed peoples of the world, unite!"
- Anthem: "Internationale"
- Capital: Mao County (1935); Barkam (1935); Jinchuan County (1935); Garzê County (1936)
- Common languages: Chinese
- Government: Federal Socialist Republic
- Chairman
  - 1935-1936: Zhang Guotao
- Legislature: Central Executive Committee
- History
  - Government established: May 30, 1935 1935
  - Disestablished: July 1, 1936
Preceded by	Succeeded by
Chinese Soviet Republic	Chinese Soviet Republic

The Northwest Soviet Federation (Chinese: 西北苏维埃联邦), or as the Northwestern Federation of the Chinese Soviet Republic (Chinese: 中华苏维埃共和国西北联邦), was a confederation of two ethnic minority governments established on May 30, 1935, including the Revolutionary Government of the Republic of Geledesha and the Tibetan People's Republic.

== History ==
In early 1935, the 4th frontal division of the Chinese Red Army carried out a campaign which sought to break the Sichuan clique's "Tumen Blockade" and emerged victorious, entering into Mao County. Zhang Guotao, commander of the division, organized a meeting with the senior cadres of the division to establish a "Northwest Federation" and a "Northwest Special Committee" in Maoxian. Subsequently, Zhang was appointed Secretary of the Northwest Special Administrative Region and Chairman of the NSF.

In June, the Central Red Army led by Mao Zedong, Zhou Enlai, Zhang Wentian, and others entered into Xiaojin County, Sichuan along with the 4th frontal division. At the time, the 4th division was about 80,000 strong while the Central Red Army had a meager 10,000, its numbers severely depleted from the previous phase of the ongoing Long March. After Zhang Guotao replaced Enlai as the General Political Commissar of the Red Army, the two divisions split once more after Guotao hoped on taking a southern route while the Central Committee insisted on taking the northern route.

The division between the two groups deepened after Zhang Guotao organized a meeting in Barkam, Sichuan, attended by the senior cadres of about 40 to 50 people. The meeting concluded with the decision to establish a separate Central Committee with Guotao as the chairman on October 5. Mid-October, through appeasement of the local populace, the Red Army under Guotao managed to build up a well sized base in Jinchuan County, and the Northwest Federation was once again established, this time with Shao Shiping as chairman. Later, the established Jinchuan Provincial Party Committee was created along with both the Geledesha Republic and Central Tibetan Autonomous Government in Xikang.

In 1936, the Zhang's luck turned as the Central Red Army was able to establish a base in Yan'an, while Zhang lost much of his troops on the journey south; what's more, the Comintern ordered him to disband his own Central Committee, its abolition was announced on June 6. When the 2nd and 6th Army joined with the 4th division in Garzê County, the former two convened to create the 2nd Red Front Army. Both armies thus moved north, the NSF and its constituents dissolved.

== See also ==
- Outline of the Chinese Civil War
