= Dontok Monastery =

Tibetan Buddhist monastery in Sichuan, China

Religion
- Affiliation: Tibetan Buddhism

Location
- Location: Sichuan, China
- Country: China

Dontok Monastery is a Buddhist monastery south of Ganzi, Sichuan, China.
