= Kandze Monastery =

Tibetan Buddhist monastery in Sichuan, China

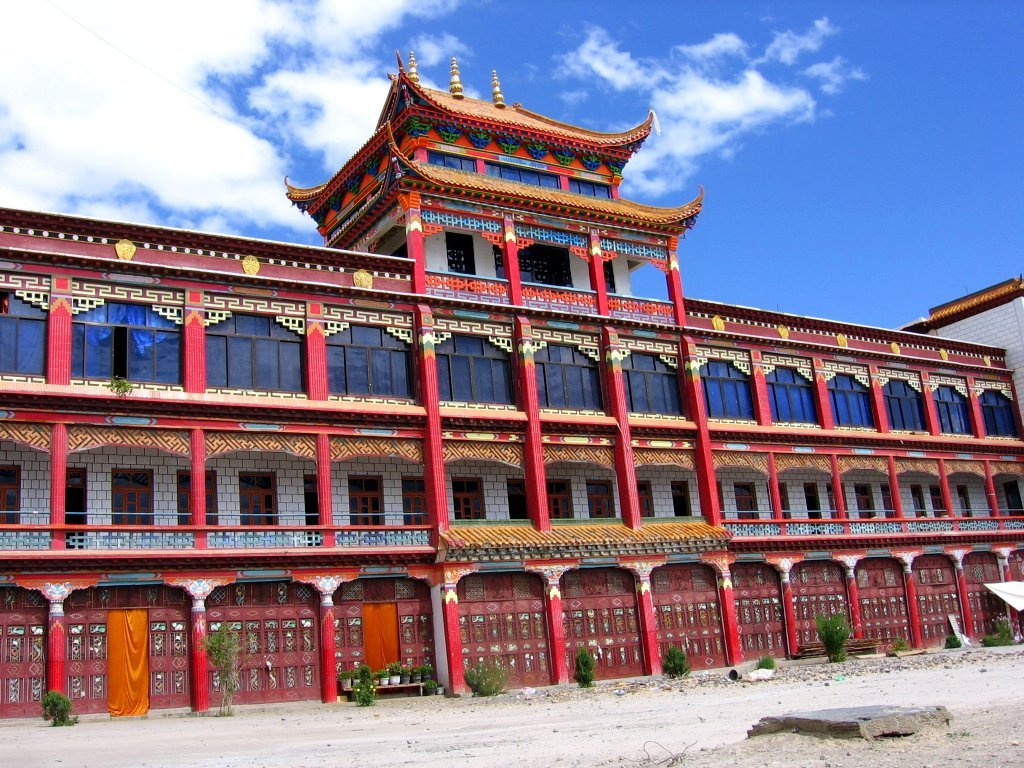

- Garzê County Kandze.

Religion
- Affiliation: Tibetan Buddhism
- Sect: Gelugpa

Location
- Location: Garzê Town, Garzê County, Ganzi Tibetan Autonomous Prefecture (Kham region), Sichuan Province, China
- Interactive map of Kandze Monastery
- Coordinates: 31°38′4″N 99°59′7″E

Architecture
- Founder: Qosot Mongols
- Established: c. 1642 CE

Kandze Monastery (also Ganzi or Garze Monastery or Gompa; Tibetan: དཀར་མཛེས་དགོན་པ, Wylie: dkar mdzes dgon pa) is situated 2 km north of Garzê Town on a hilltop overlooking the town, in Tibet.

== History ==
The monastery was built c. 1642 CE by the Khoshut or Qosot Mongols overlooking their castles known as Mazur and Khangsar. It once housed 1,500 monks making it, with Chamdo, the largest in Kham. The pilgrimage circuit around the monastery was almost eight kilometres long. In the 1909-1918 war the castles were occupied by Chinese troops and are now in ruins.

It has been extensively renovated since 1981 and now houses about 700 monks, including three tulkus - one of whom, Lamdark Rinpoche, returned from Switzerland and established a girls' school.

== Description ==
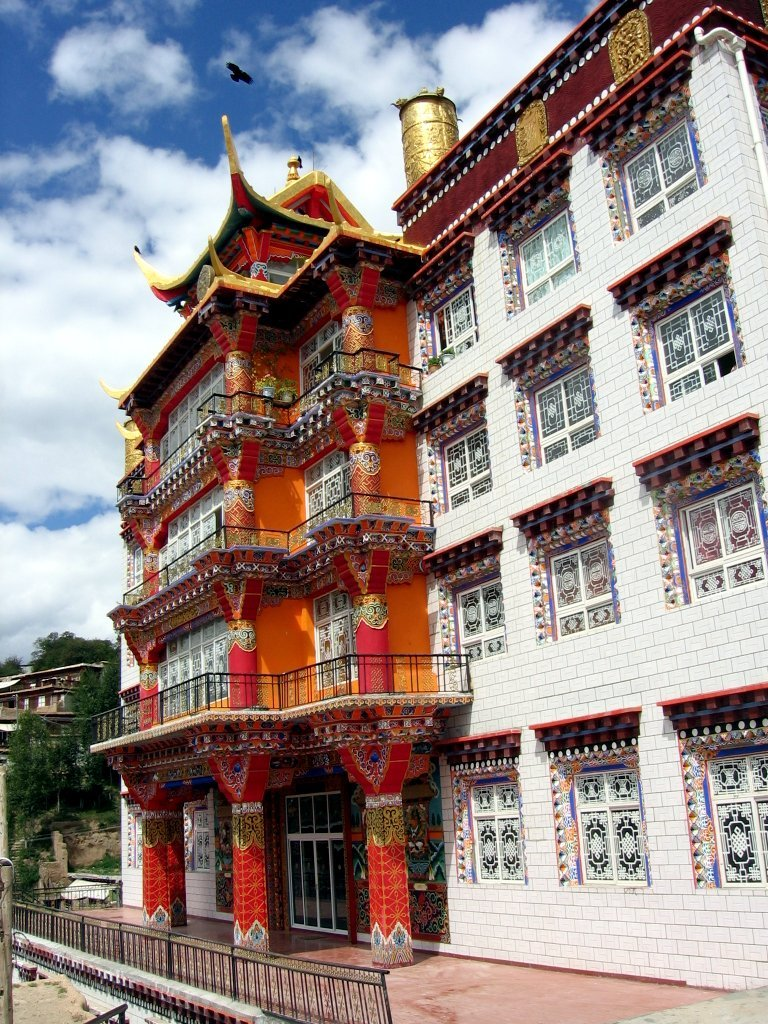
Garzê (Kandze) Monastery facade.

Assembly Hall

The main Assembly Hall building has a golden roof and has views of the valley and nearby town. It is approached by a long flight of stairs and the inner sanctum is reached though long passageways formed by red wooden columns.

Inside three sets of images are displayed high up in glass cabinets representing the founders of the Nyingmapa, Kadampa and Gelugpa lineages. There are also a number of fine tangkas representing the meditational deities, Guhyasamaja, Cakrasamvara, and Yamantaka.

Maitreya Hall

The Maitreya Hall contains a huge image of Jampa (Maitreya), the Buddha-to-come, flanked by images of Shakyamuni, Tsongkhapa, Dipamkara and Sitatapatra.

Other rooms

Upstairs is a library containing the Kangyur and old images of the eleven-faced form of Avalokiteśvara and the great Gelupa teacher, Je Tsongkhapa (1357–1419). There is also Gonkhang room dedicated to the guardian deities mentioned above which is entered through a black and gold door, and painted images of protector deities.

To the northeast of the monastery on a hill is a reconstructed white chorten (stupa).

== Footnotes ==
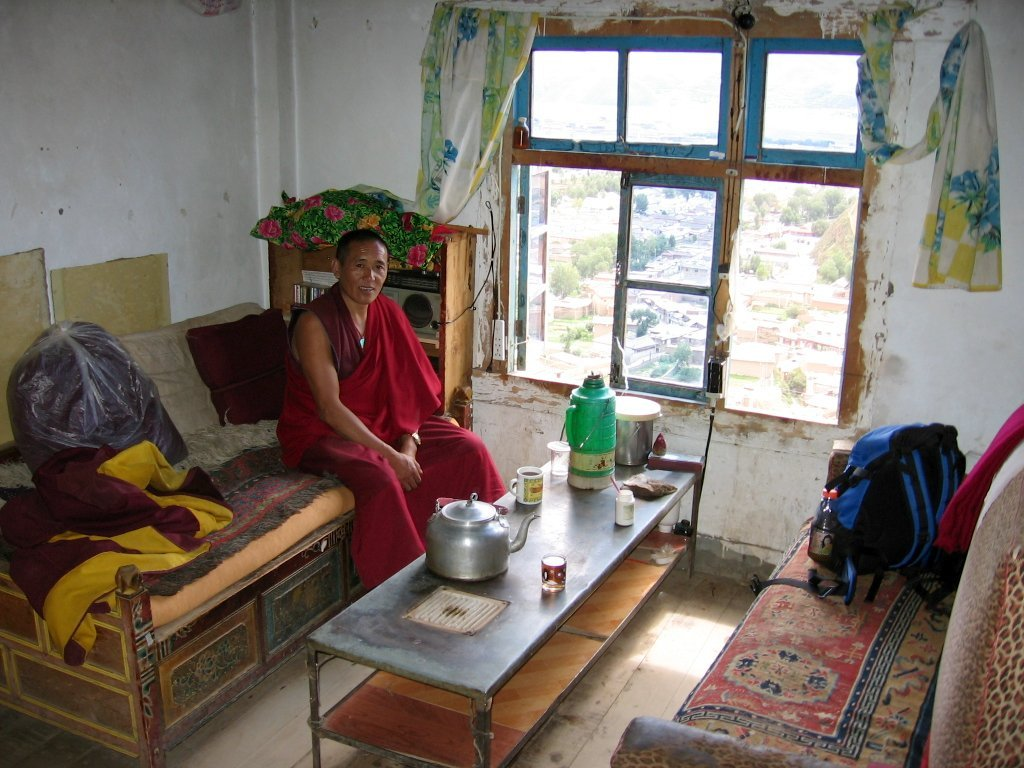
A monk in Kandze Monastery

=== References ===
- Dorje, Gyurme. (1999). Footprint Tibet Handbook; with Bhutan. (2nd ed.) Bath, England: Footprint Handbooks ISBN 0-8442-2190-2
- Mayhew, Bradley & Kohn, Michael. Tibet. (2005). 6th ed. Lonely Planet. ISBN 1-74059-523-8
- Leffman, David; Lewis, Simon; Atiyah, Jeremy & others. (2005). The Rough Guide to China. 4th ed. New York: Rough Guides ISBN 978-1-84353-479-2
