= Khenpo Yeshe Phuntsok =

Khenpo Yeshe Phuntsok was born in the Kham region of Tibet in Sichuan Province, China in 1971.

After completing Chinese primary school from 1978 to 1983, he focused on learning Tibetan and was admitted to Sichuan Tibetan school in 1985.

He arrived at Serthar Larung Gar Five Sciences Buddhist Academy in late 1986. From his root guru, Dharmaraja Jigmey Phuntsok Rinpoche, he received numerous teachings of both Sutrayana and Tantrayana, as well as many direct transmissions of tantric pith instructions. After having earned the title "Khenpo" conferred by Rinpoche, he took part in the teachings at the Institute and was responsible for educating the Tibetan Sangha for nine years. In 1996, he was entrusted by Rinpoche to devote himself to the education of Chinese-speaking monastics.

Today, Khenpo still resides at the Institute to teach and guide both the monastics and lay practitioners, implementing the study and practice of bodhicitta, prajna (wisdom), Pure Land Practice, Lamrim (stages of the path to enlightenment), the Five Treatises of Maitreya, and other tantric and Mahayana teachings. He has founded the Mahayana and Vajrayana Buddhist Society, which offers many teachings including classes on mind training, lamrim ("the stages of the path"), pure land practice, prajna (wisdom), and meditation.

== Books ==
- 《菩提道次第广论讲记》
- Vajrasattva Meditation: An Illustrated Guide
