= Tibetan People's Republic =

Short-lived contingent of the Northwest Chinese Soviet Federation

Chinese Soviet Central Tibetan Autonomous Government
- Minority Government of the Northwest Chinese Soviet Federation
- 1936
  - Type: Autonomous Soviet Socialist Government
- History
  - Established: 5 May 1936
  - Disestablished: 1936

The Tibetan People's Republic or the Chinese Soviet Central Tibetan Autonomous Government (Chinese: 中華蘇維埃中央博巴自治政府; pinyin: Zhōnghuá sūwéi'āi zhōngyāng bó bā zìzhì zhèngfǔ; Tibetan: བོད་པའི་སྡེ་པ, Wylie: bod pa'i sde pa) was a short-lived contingent of the Northwest Chinese Soviet Federation established on May 5, 1936. It was a Tibetan autonomous government under the Chinese Communist Party established by the Chinese Red Army during the Long March to assist the communist coup of the Tibetans in Dawu County, Luhuo County, Yajiang County and Garzê County against its theocracy.

Its main operations were located in the tusi chiefdom of Derge (now Dêgê County). Key people involved with the republic included Spommdav Rdorje, Bkrashis Dbangphyug, and others. The Republic was dissolved along with the Northwest Soviet Federation following the convening of the Chinese 2nd and 4th Army in Garzê County.
