= Gonpo Namgyal =

Tibetan rebel leader

Gonpo Namgyal (1799–1865) (Tibetan: མགོན་པོ་རྣམ་རྒྱལ, Wylie: mgon po rnam rgyal, sometimes Gönpo Namgyel ; Chinese: 波日·工布朗结; pinyin: bōrì gōngbù lǎngjiē), also known as Bulungwa or Blind Warrior of Nyarong, was a Tibetan rebel leader from the Nyarong valley who unified the region, then most of Kham in a series of military campaigns from the late 1830s to the mid-1860s, warring also against Qing Dynasty forces and later the Tibetan government in Lhasa's Ganden Phodrang forces. While he was successful in defeating Qing forces, he was eventually captured and killed by Tibetan forces, putting an end to his rebel state in Nyarong and to Qing presence in Kham.

== Background ==
Gonpo Namgyal was born in Nyarong; his parents descended from a lineage of local chieftains who ruled the middle of that valley. His father had refused to submit to recent local Qing hegemony and had been killed for it. The region of Nyarong was poor due to its isolation and inaccessibility, and its inhabitants made their living by raiding caravans and bandit activity. After Namgyal inherited the chieftainship from his parents, his entry into Tibet's historical record began.

== Rise to power ==
By the end of the 1840s, Namgyal had united through military force the three chiefdoms of the Nyarong Valley, marking a break from its historical disunity. An earlier Qing campaign into Nyarong was also defeated. Namgyal followed these victories with attacks on the Hor States, on the kingdoms of Derge, and Litang, as well as, in the words of Tibetan historian Yudru Tsomu, "harassing and plundering the domains of the Kingdom of Chakla". To avoid Namgyal's campaigns, due to his reputation for being merciless, states such as Golog, Nangchen, Serta, and Jyekundo decided to submit to his rule. By the early 1860s, he began impeding trade linking China to Kham and Kham to Central Tibet. The Ganden Phodrang's Tibetan forces then promptly reacted. Namgyal's reported threat to enter Lhasa's Jokhang accompanied by his forces where he would steal two of the holiest statues of Tibetan Buddhism and install them at Nyarong, thereby forcing pilgrims to travel there, could have also motivated the Tibetan forces. By 1864, he controlled almost all of Kham.

== Defeat and capture ==
In 1862, he took control of the Sichuan-Tibet Avenue, cut off the postal route, and blocked the delivery of food and salaries for the troops stationed in Tibet. For the Tibetan Kashag government, his control of the Kham area seriously affected the Sichuan-Tibet tea trade, and he took an anti-Buddhist stance and threatened the Kashag government, which was eager to exterminate him.

After the Qing Dynasty defeated the Taiping Heavenly Kingdom and the peasant uprising in Sichuan, in 1863, the Minister in Tibet was ordered to form a tie-up with the Governor-General of Sichuan to mobilize troops to suppress Bori and Gongbulang. In 1865, the Tibetan army first launched an attack on the Bori-Gongblang knot on the Jinsha River, and other Qing troops from all walks of life arrived one after another, and the Bori-Gongblang knot was besieged. In July, the Tibetan army surrounded Bori Village. Bori Gongbong led his troops to resist and ran out of ammunition and food, so he set fire to Bori Village and died in the fire.

== Legacy ==
After its defeat of Namgyal, the Ganden Phodrang government regained control of Kham by 1866–67, established its seat at Nyarong, and restrengthened its influence in Derge and in the Hor States.

This resulted in another future conflict between Tibet's Ganden Phodrang government and Chinese Qing leaders, the latter of whom eventually sent military forces then Zhao Erfeng's 1905 invasion forces into Kham. These forces continued on to invade Lhasa, where they were finally defeated and surrendered in 1912 to the 13th Dalai Lama, during the collapse of the Qing dynasty.
