= Xise Township, Sichuan =

Xise Township 昔色乡
- Township
- Xisexiang
- Location in Sichuan
- Coordinates: 31°41′10″N 99°42′37″E
- Country: People's Republic of China
- Province: Sichuan
- Autonomous prefecture: Garzê Tibetan Autonomous Prefecture
- County: Garzê County

Area
  - Total: 216.9 km^{2} (83.7 sq mi)

Population (2010)
  - Total: 2,499
  - Density: 11.52/km^{2} (29.84/sq mi)
- Time zone: UTC+8 (China Standard)

Xise (Chinese: 昔色乡) is a township in Garzê County, Garzê Tibetan Autonomous Prefecture, Sichuan, China. In 2010, Xise Township had a total population of 2,499: 1,178 males and 1,321 females: 538 aged under 14; 1,803 aged 15–65 and 158 aged over 65.
