= Tongkor Monastery =

Tibetan Buddhist monastery in Sichuan, China

- Location within Sichuan

Religion
- Affiliation: Tibetan Buddhism
- Sect: Gelug

Location
- Location: Zithang, Garzê County, Garzê Tibetan Autonomous Prefecture, Sichuan
- Interactive map of Tongkor Monastery
- Coordinates: 31.7553°N 100.2100°E

Tongkor or Tongkhor Monastery (Tibetan: སྟོང་འཁོར་དགོན།, Wylie: stong vkhor dgon), also known as Ganden Chokhorling or Dangar Gompa, is a Tibetan Buddhist monastery located in Zithang Town, Garzê County, Garzê Tibetan Autonomous Prefecture, Sichuan, China.

== History ==
The monastery was founded by Tongkor I, Dawa Gyaltsen, in the 15th century. It was previously the largest monastery in the county with some 500 monks about the beginning of the 20th century. This had dropped to about 70 monks at the time of the 2008 crackdown.

"On April 3, 2008, troops fired upon protesters from Tongkor (Chinese: Donggu) monastery, 60 kilometers from Kardze town, killing at least 10 people. The protests were sparked by a raid on the monastery by police, the detention of a senior monk, and resentment over intensified Patriotic Education."

Some accounts claim up to 14 people were killed.
