= Nyarong =

Historical region in Tibet

Nyarong (Tibetan: ཉག་རོང་།, Wylie: nyag rong; simplified Chinese: 瞻对; traditional Chinese: 瞻對; pinyin: Zhānduì) is a Tibetan historical river valley region located in Eastern Kham. It is generally equated with modern Xinlong County, which is called Nyarong in Tibetan, though the traditional region also includes parts of Litang County and Baiyü County.

== Names ==
The most common name, Nyarong means "river valley". However, the region is also referred to as Chagdud or Chakdü (Tibetan: ལྕགས་མདུད, Wylie: lcags mdud, THL: Chakdü), which refers to a prominent monk who came from the region; variants of these two names are also used. Legend say that a monk, called Sherap Gyeltsen, tied a knot on an iron club in presence of Kubilai Khan, in 1253. In exchange he was rewarded by official seal and documents as chief of the Nyarong. His family clan was then called "Chakdü pöntsang" (Tibetan: ལྕགས་མདུད་དཔོན་ཚང, Wylie: lcags mdud dpon tshang, THL: Chakdü pöntsang, literally, "the official family who tied a knot in an iron [club]").

== Geography ==
Nyarong is a valley located on and around the middle portion of the Yalong River, with Derge to the west, Garzê to the north, the Hor States to the east, and Litang to the south. The valley is particularly low compared to the surrounding mountains, and the upper portion of the valley is quite narrow. This makes it hard to access the region, especially without modern transport. It was historically also quite poor, as there is little flat land in the region.

== History ==
For much of its history, no single polity controlled Nyarong; instead the region was controlled by different tribes. This is considered unusual because while tribal administration was common among pastoral regions, Nyarong instead depended on agriculture. Historically, due to its geographical inaccessibility, Nyarong was not often involved in the political machinations or trade routes of the rest of Tibet; it first enters the historical record in 762 as levies were raised from the region during the Tibetan Empire's raids into India. By the 1800s, Nyarong was controlled by a powerful family divided into three branches, known as the "Three Iron Knots". While it was nominally controlled by the Qing Dynasty, it was practically independent due to its isolation; the population made much of their living by banditry

Nyarong's main claim to fame is the local ruler Gombo Namgye, who had united the disparate tribes in the region by force by 1850. However, the Qing overlords of Kham were not pleased by this development, and launched an incursion into Nyarong, supported by the surrounding Khampa states. However, against the odds, Namgye was able to resist the invasion; he retaliated by invading Litang, Derge, and the Hor States. By 1862, Gombo Namgye controlled the trade and communication routes between China and Tibet. He broke the Qing official postal service, and blocked transportation of provisions and funds to Chinese troops in Central Tibet. However, he was stopped by the Ganden Podrang government, who killed him in 1865; they then took the chance to take control of the region. This sent Nyarong back into the unimportance it still enjoys today, though this has been somewhat disrupted by tourism. This was also momentarily disrupted as Nyarong was a key base of resistance against the Annexation of Tibet by the People's Republic of China.

== Notable people ==
- Gombo Namgye (1798–1865), Tibetan rebel leader
- Lodi Gyari Rinpoche (1949–2018), activist in exile, journalist, negotiator
- Tertön Sogyal (1856–1926), teacher of the thirteenth Dalai Lama

== See also ==
- Red Poppies, novel set in Nyarong from the 1920s to 1950
