= Taktsang Paljor Sangpo =

Sakya monk and archivist

Taktsang Paljor Sangpo (Tibetan: sTag tshang dPal 'byor bzang po), alias Śrībhūtibhadra, was a Sakya monk and archivist (yig mkhan) in the 15th century. He is the author of an important Tibetan historical work of the yig tshang literature.

== Archives of China and Tibet ==
In 1434 he completed his collection of records Archives of China and Tibet (rGya bod yig tshang chen mo), which in terms of literary genre essentially resembles the Red Annals (deb-ther dmar-po), but it provides more detailed accounts of historical events. A new edition appeared in the series mes po'i shul bzhag (Tibetan: མེས་པོའི་ཤུལ་བཞག; Chinese: Xianzhe yishu 先哲遗书) of the Paltsek Research Institute, a Chinese translation was created by the Chinese tibetologists Chen Qingying 陳慶英 and Zhou Runnian 周潤年, and appeared in the Chinese series Zangji yidian congshu ( 藏籍译典丛书) under the title Han-Zang shiji 汉藏史集.

The Buddhologist David Seyfort Ruegg summarizes the content of the Rgya bod yig tshang mkhas pa dga' byed with the words:

we find listed the royal and princely lineages of India, Li yul, China, Mi nyag, Tibet, and Mongolia side by side with the lineages of the princehierarchs of the Sa skya, Bka’ brgyud, and other schools.

== See also ==
- Zangji yidian congshu (藏籍译典丛书)
- A Collection of Historical Archives of Tibet (Tibetan: bod kyi lo rgyus yig tshags gces bsdus; Chinese: Xizang lishi dang'an huicui 西藏历史档案荟萃)

== Bibliography ==
- rGyal rabs mang po'i legs bshad rnam grangs yid 'dzin nor bu'i phreng ba / rgya bod yig tshang chen mo. dPal brtsegs bod yig dpe rnying zhib 'jug khang nas bsgrigs. Pe cin: krung go'i bod rig pa dpe skrun khang. Mes po'i shul bzhags, no. 28, 2007. ISBN 978-7-80057-857-1
- Rgya bod yig tshang chen mo. Chengdu: Si-khron mi-rigs dpe-skrun-khang / Sichuan Ethnic Publishing House 1985. With an introduction by Dungkar Lozang Trinlé.
- Han Zang shiji. Xizang Renmin Chubanshe, Lhasa 1986, ISBN 7-223-00942-X (translated by Chen Qingying and Zhou Runnian)
- Zhu Lishuang: The Annals of the Noble Land Khotan: A New Translation of a Chapter of rGya bod yig tshang chen mo – Peking University
- Dan Martin, Yael Bentor: Tibetan histories: a bibliography of Tibetan-language historical works. 1997 (No. 115)
