= Kardze Town =

Kardze
- Township

Chinese transcription(s)
  - Chinese characters: 甘孜
  - Pinyin: Gānzī

Tibetan transcription(s)
  - Tibetan: དཀར་མཛེས་
  - Wylie transliteration: dkar mdzes
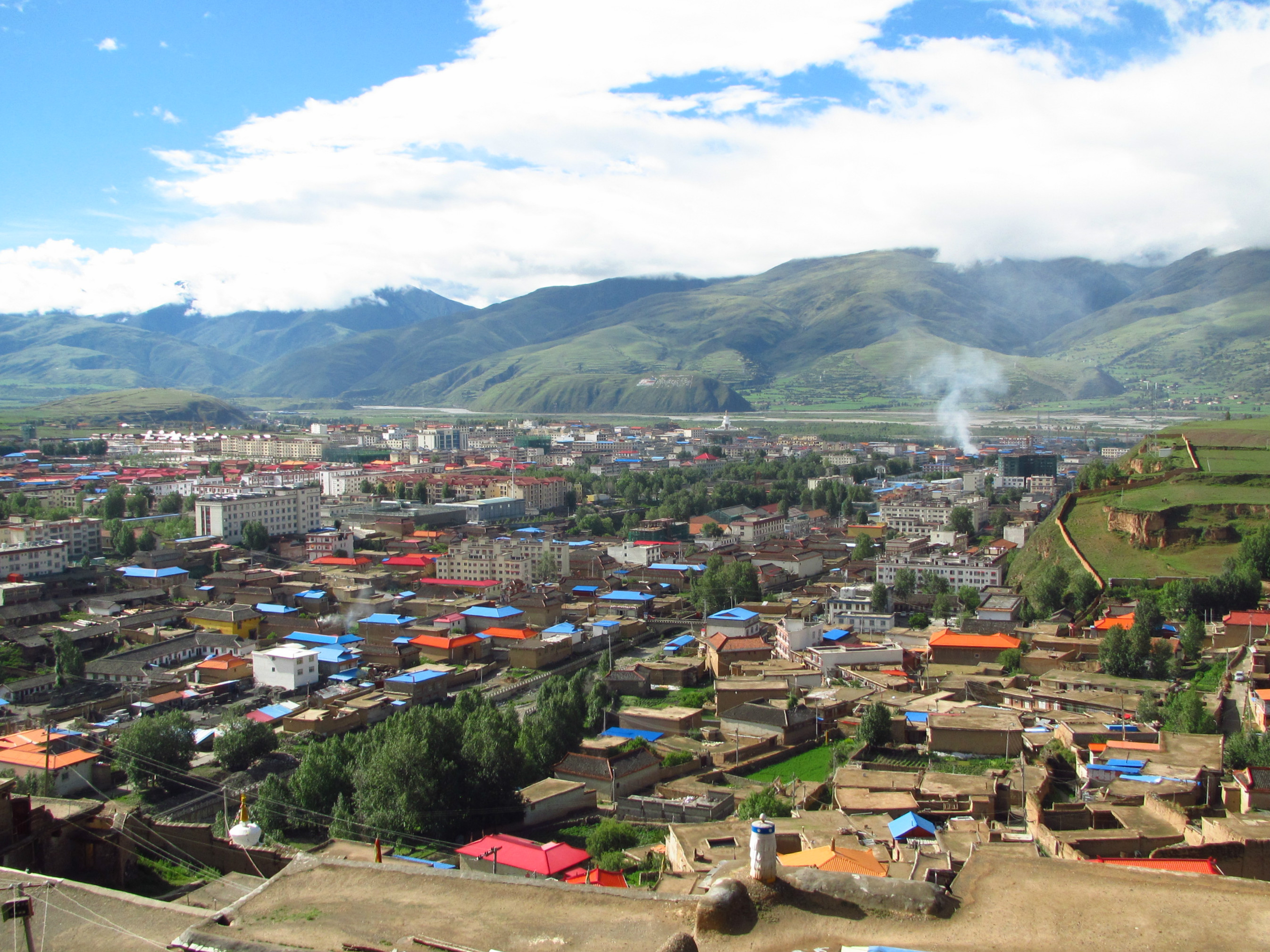
- View of Kardze from the north

- Location in Sichuan
- Coordinates: 31°37′38″N 99°59′19″E
- Country: China
- Province: Sichuan
- Prefecture: Kardze Tibetan Autonomous Prefecture
- County: Kardze County

Population (2010)
  - Total: 16,920
- Time zone: UTC+8 (CST)

Kardze (Note: Alternative spellings: Kandze, Kanze.) or Garzê (Tibetan: དཀར་མཛེས, Wylie: dkar mdzes, THL: kar dzé), called Ganzi in Chinese (Chinese: 甘孜; pinyin: Gānzī), is a town and county seat in Kardze County, Kardze Tibetan Autonomous Prefecture in western Sichuan Province, China. Despite Kardze Prefecture being named after the town, the prefecture capital is Kangding, 365 km to the southeast. As of 2010, Kardze was home to 16,920 inhabitants. Kardze is an ethnic Tibetan township and is located in the historical Tibetan region of Kham. It contains the 15th century Kandze Monastery, home to over 500 Gelugpa monks.

== Geography ==
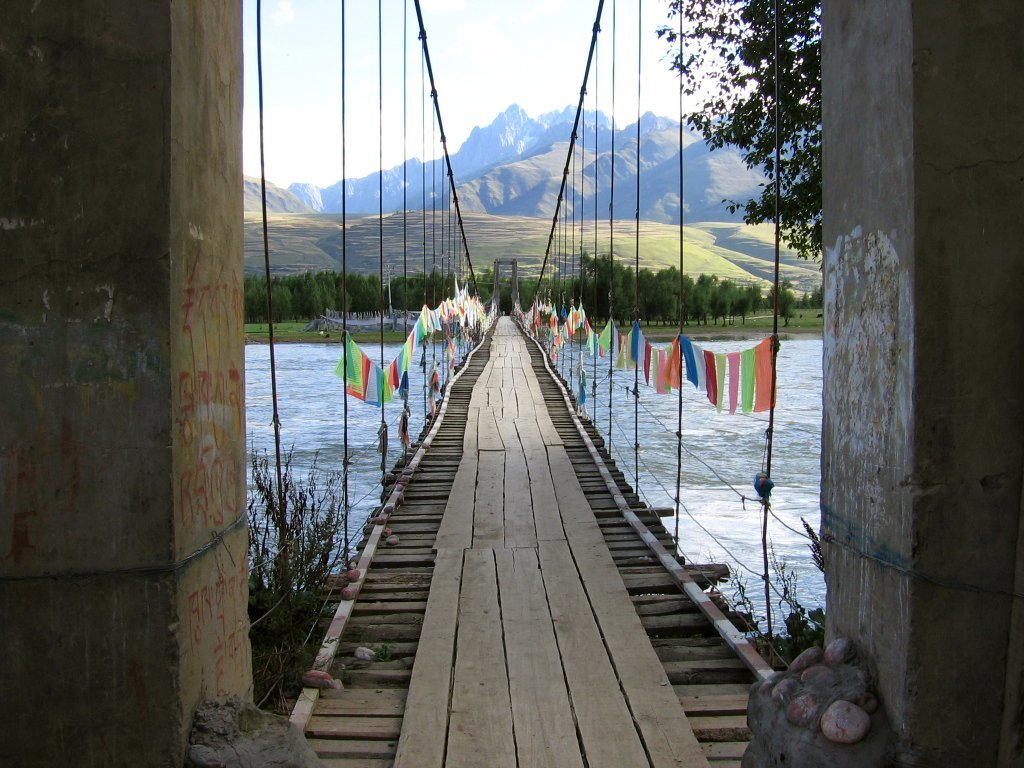
The suspension bridge across the Yalong River

Kardze lies in the large Kardze valley at 3390 metres above sea level and is surrounded by rocky terrain and mountains. The Yalong River's tributary Rongcha River passes through the town from north to south.

== Gallery ==
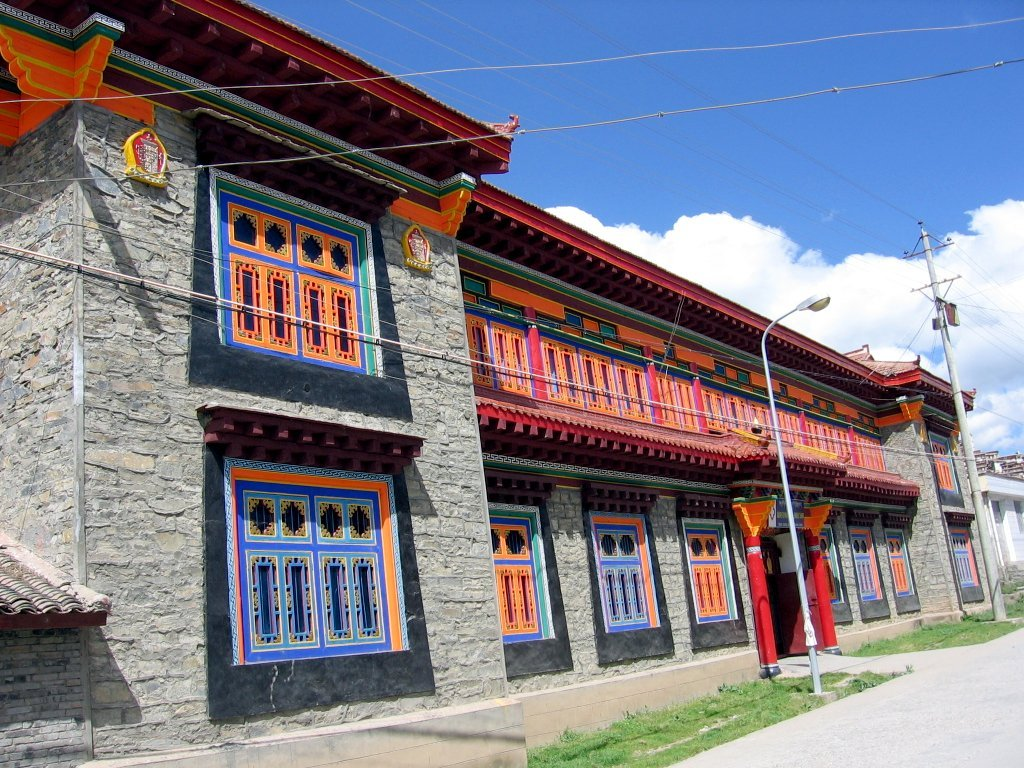

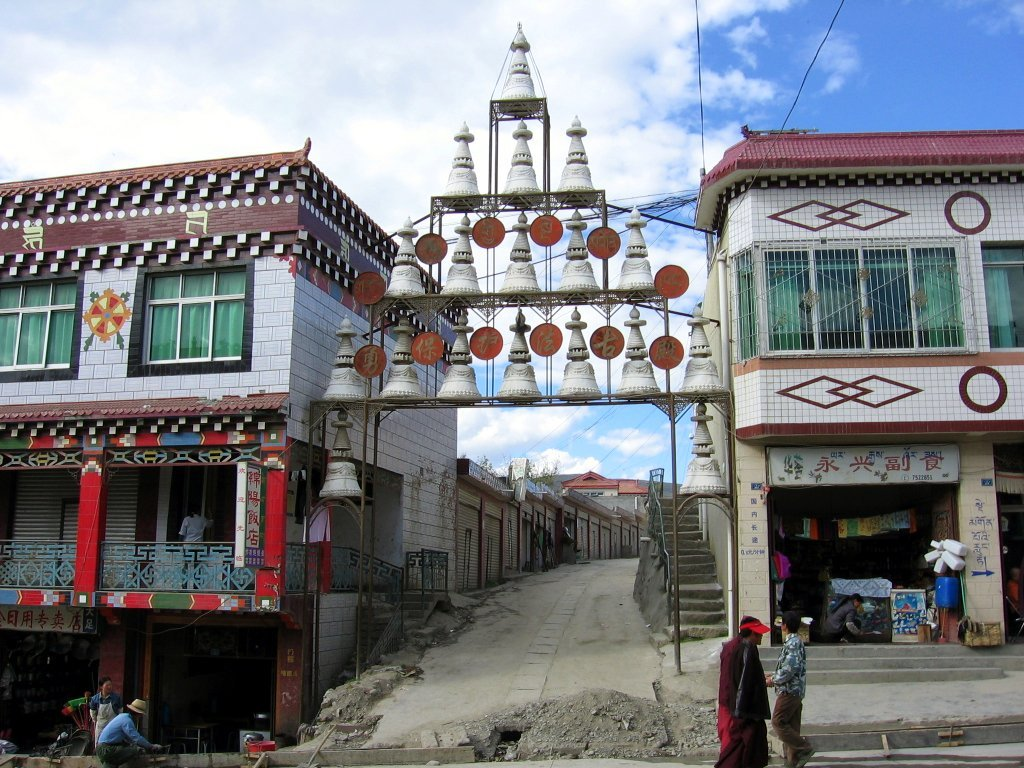

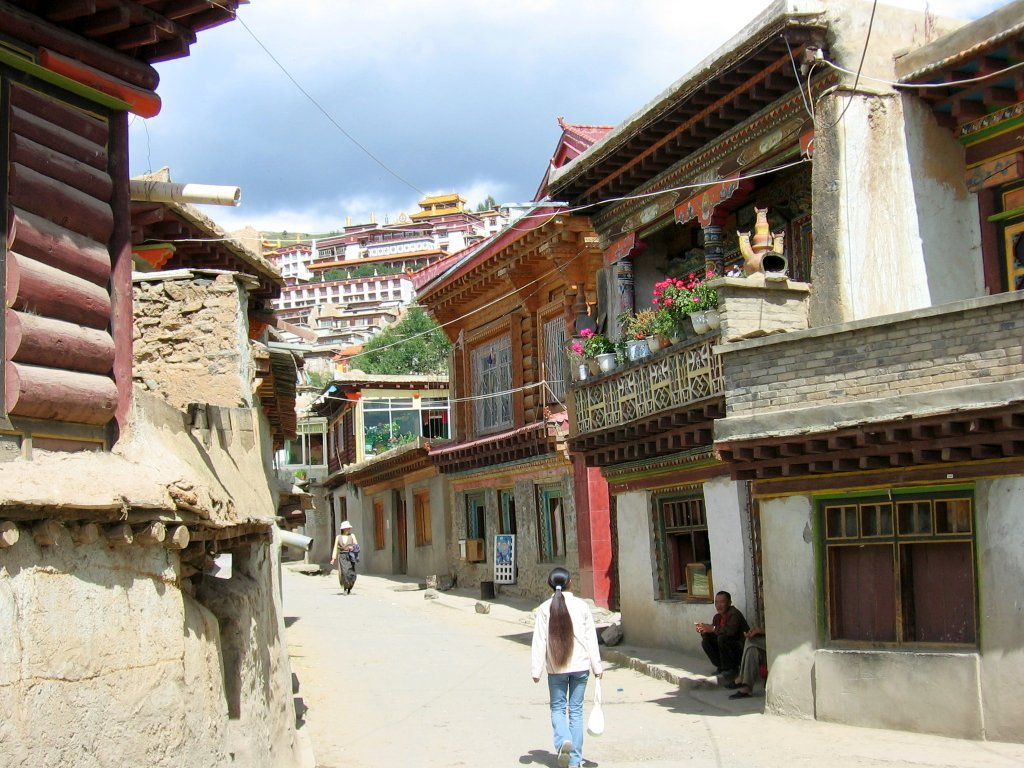

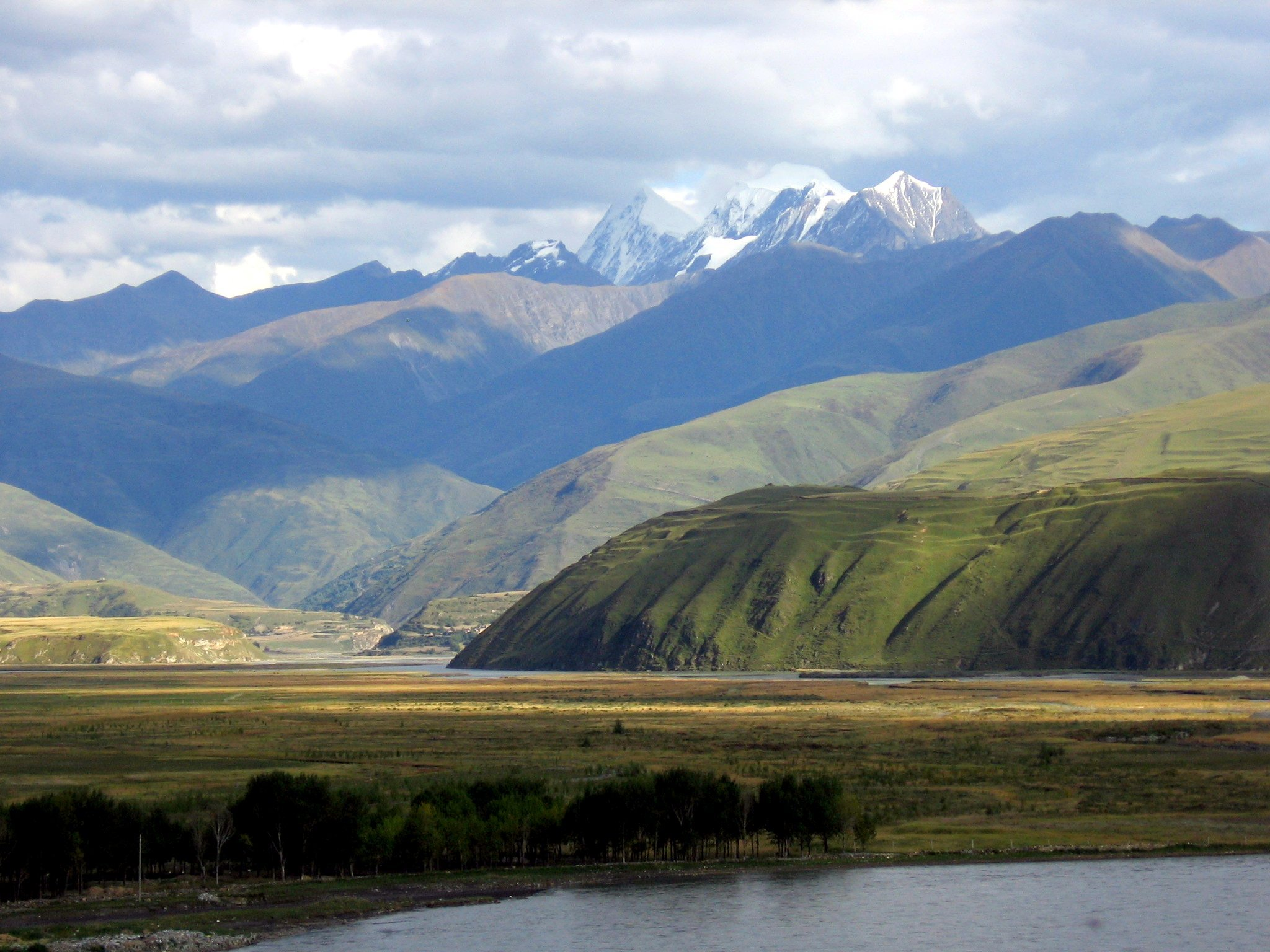

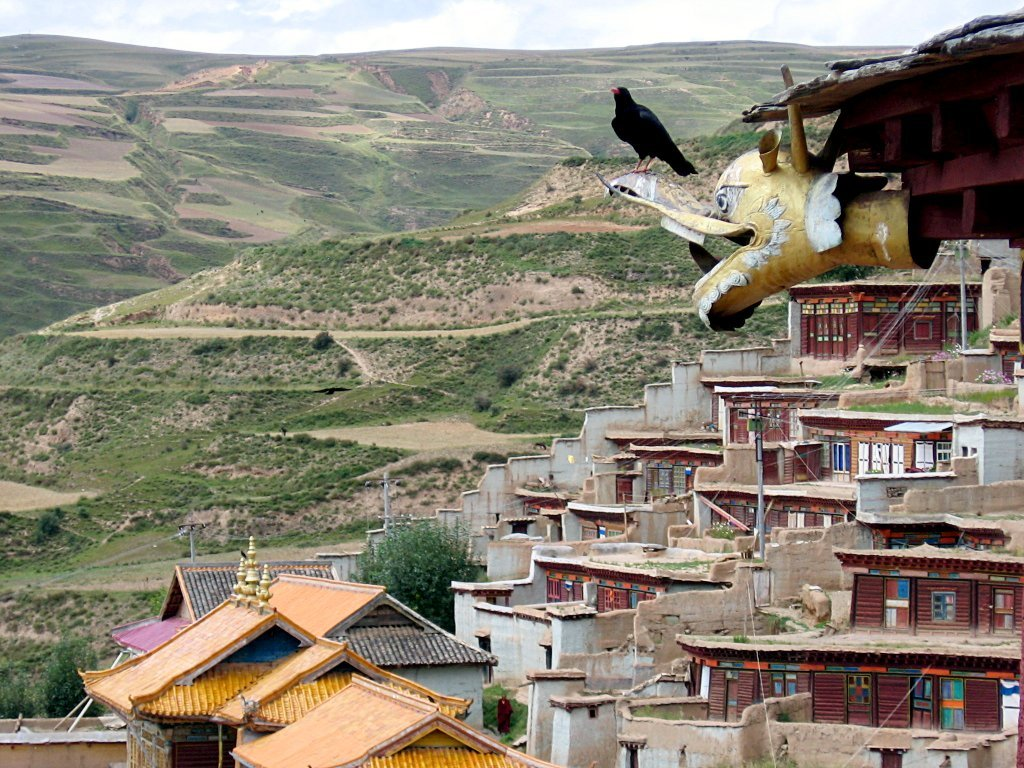

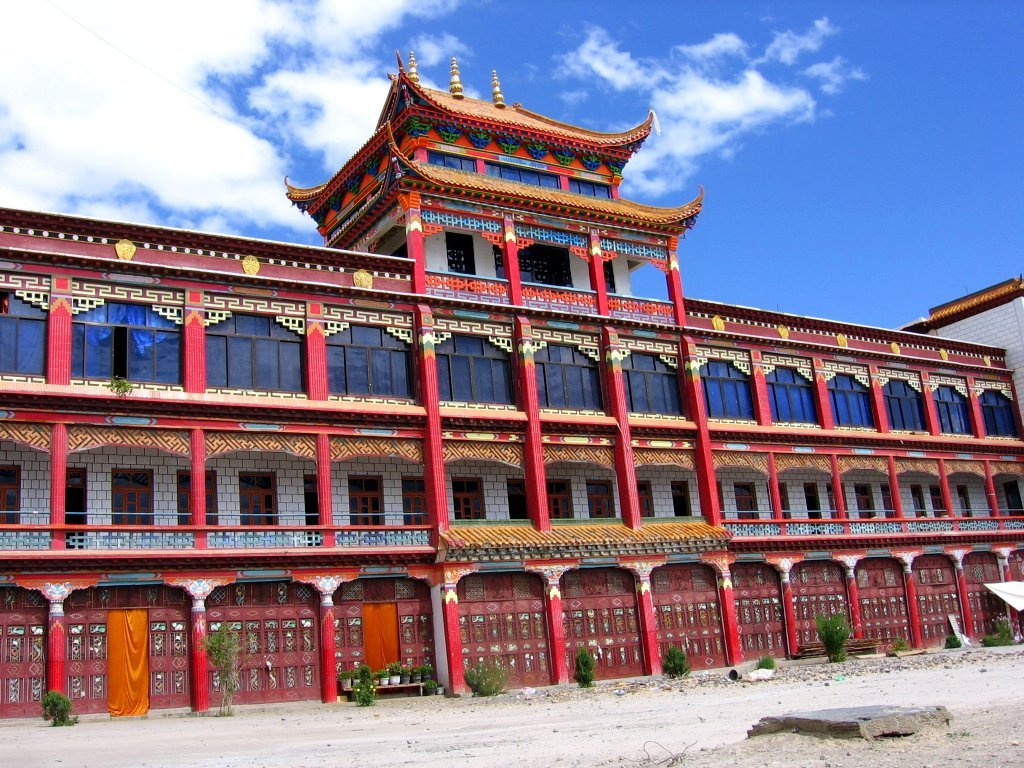

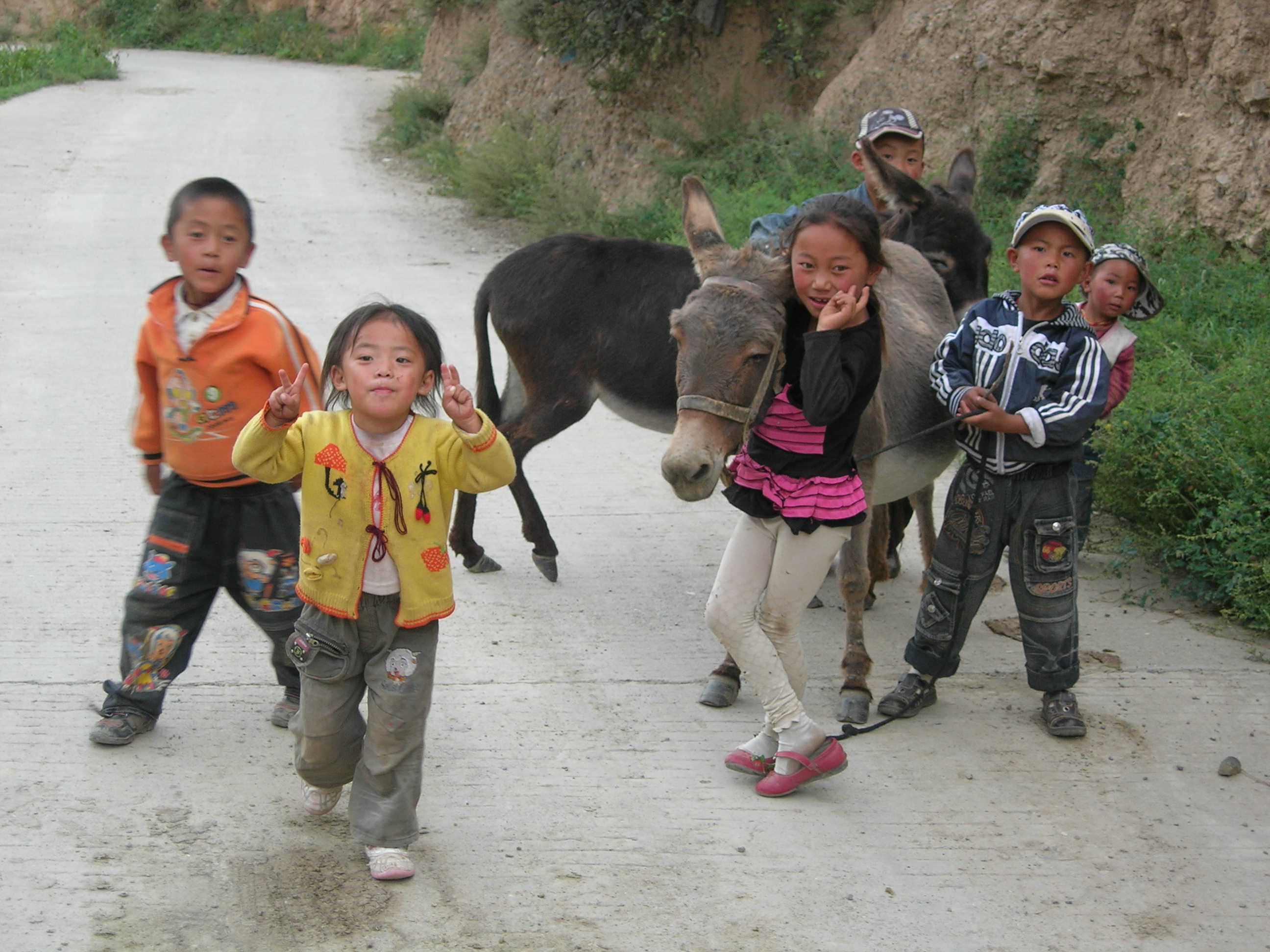
