= Kham =

Traditional region of Tibet

Coordinates: 30°36′6.01″N 96°50′29.59″E

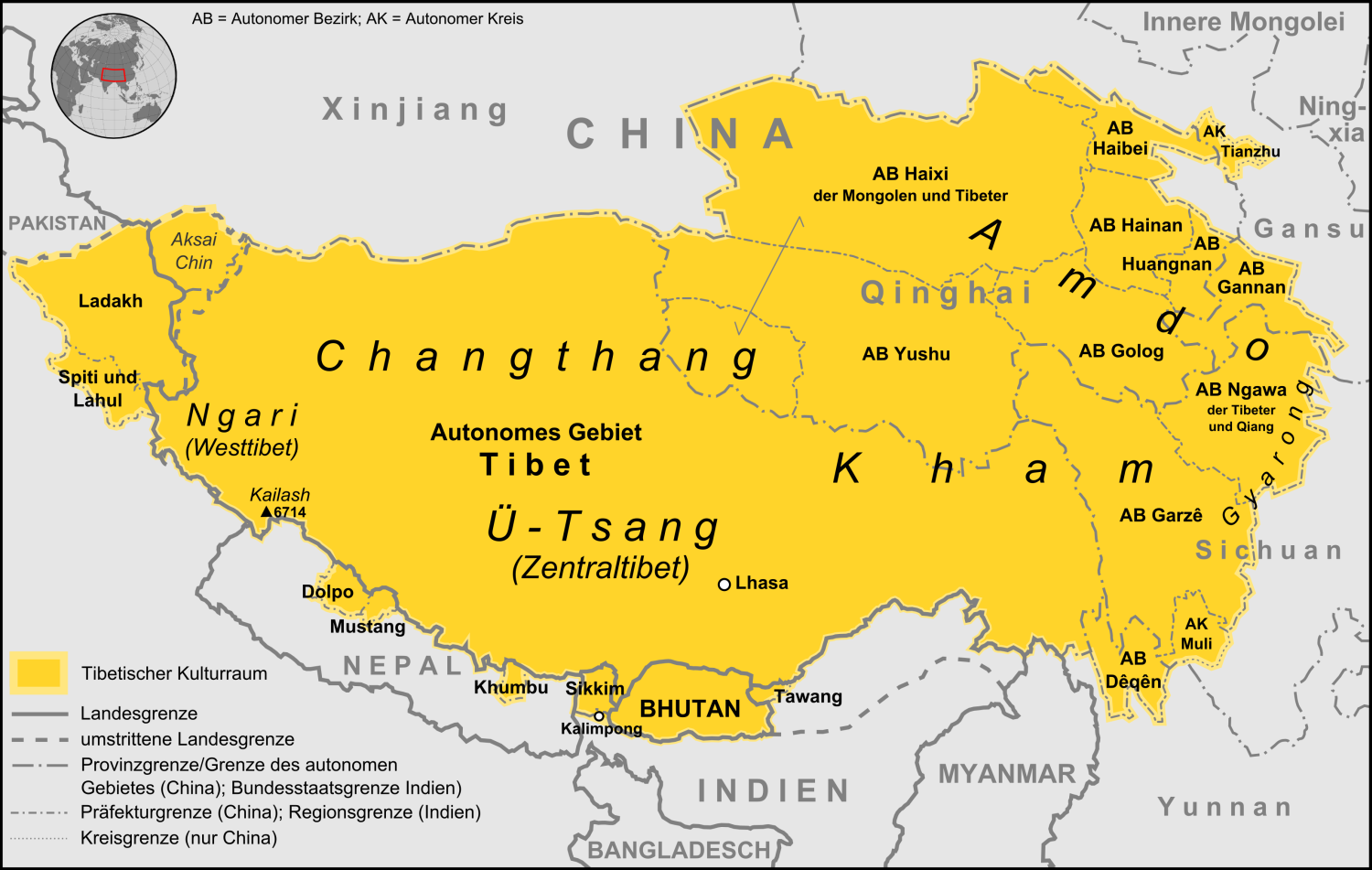
Kham province in Tibet

Kham (Tibetan: ཁམས་, Wylie: khams; Chinese: 康; pinyin: Kāng) is one of the three traditional Tibetan regions, the others being Amdo (also known as Domey) in the northeast, and Ü-Tsang in central Tibet. The original residents of Kham are called Khampas (Tibetan: ཁམས་པ་, Wylie: khams pa), and were governed locally by chieftains and monasteries. Kham covers a land area distributed in multiple province-level administrative divisions in present-day China, most of it in Tibet Autonomous Region and Sichuan, with smaller portions located within Qinghai and Yunnan.

Densely forested with grass plains, its convergence of six valleys and four rivers supported independent Kham polities of Tibetan warrior kingdoms together with Tibetan Buddhist monastic centers. The early trading route between Central Tibet and China traveled through Kham, and Kham is said to be the inspiration for Shangri-La in James Hilton's novel.

Settled as Tibet's eastern frontier in the 7th century, King Songtsen Gampo built temples along its eastern border.

In 1939, an eastern area of Kham was officially established as Xikang Province of China.

== Geography ==
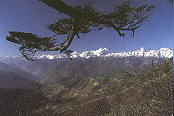
Daxue Mountains

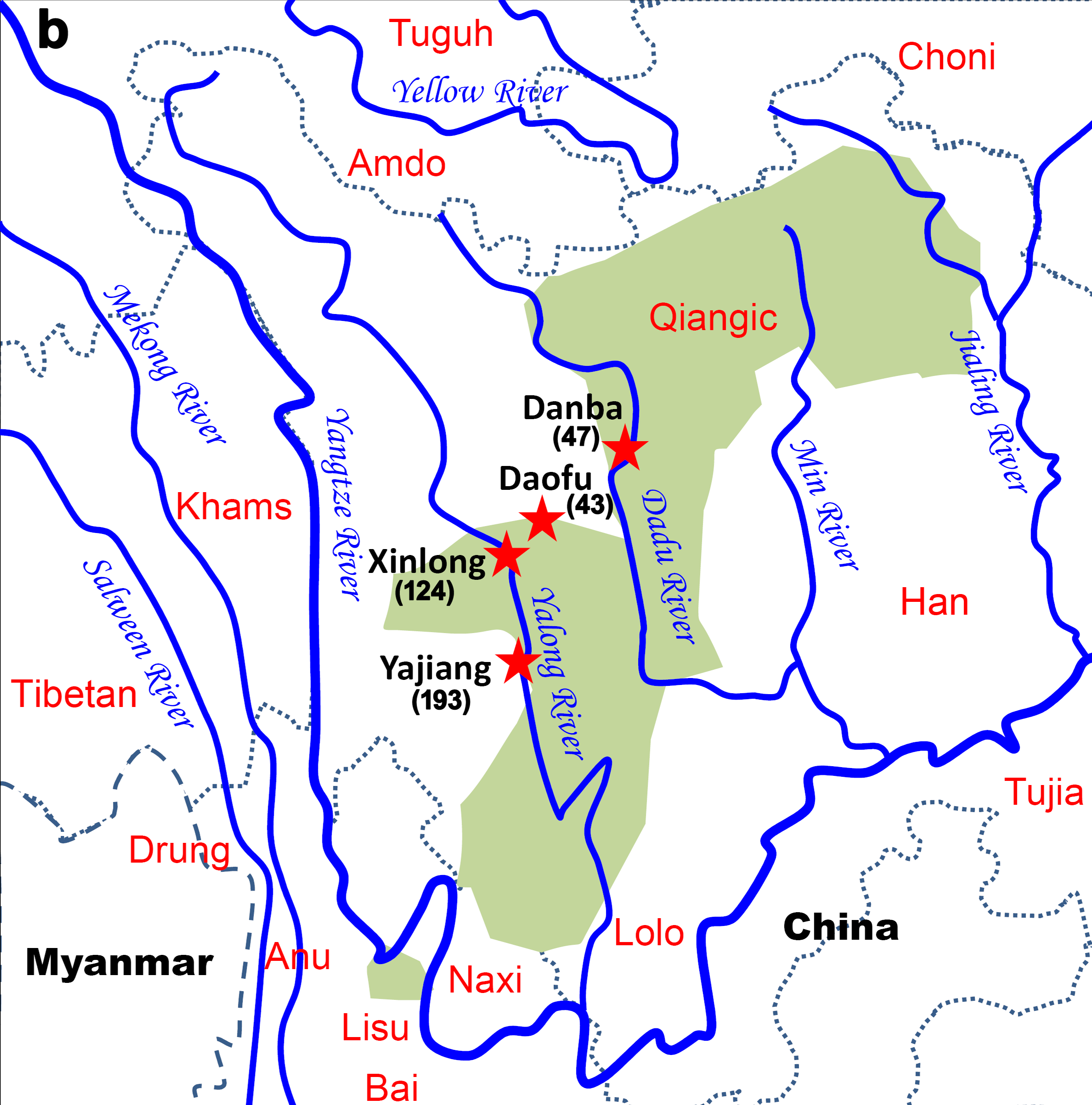
Rivers of Kham

Kham has a rugged terrain characterized by mountain ridges and gorges running from northwest to southeast, and collectively known as the Hengduan Mountains. Numerous rivers, including the Mekong, Yangtze, Yalong River, and the Salween River flow through Kham.

Under the modern administrative division of China, Kham includes a total of 50 contemporary counties, which have been incorporated into the Chinese provinces of Sichuan (16 counties), Yunnan (three counties), and Qinghai (6 counties) as well as the eastern portion of the Tibet Autonomous Region (25 counties).

== Ethnic groups ==
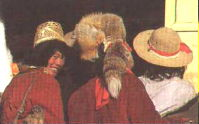
Khampas, the inhabitants of Kham

The people of Kham, the Khampas, are reputed warriors renowned for their marksmanship and horsemanship. References state many Khampas in the Hor States include mention of their Mongolian heritage.

There are significant differences in traditions and beliefs—even physical appearance—between the peoples of Kham and Lhasa. Most of Kham's residents speak Khams Tibetan while at least one-third of the residents are speakers of Qiangic languages, a family of twelve distinct but interrelated languages that are not closely related to Khams Tibetan.

As a frontier region, Kham integrated and "Tibetanized" early Mongolian and Chinese populations. After Güshri Khan's invasion of Kham in 1639, Mongolian people and Amdo's tribal people resettled to the region.

Khampa men are sometimes described as taller than other Tibetan groups and among one of the tallest people in Asia, with the reported average height of an adult men being 180 cm. This can be seen through records of various anthropologists.

== History ==
=== 7th - 10th centuries ===
The Pugyal Dynasty (or Yarlung) of the Tibetan Empire sent troops east from Lhasa to the reaches of the Tibetan Plateau, where they interacted with local cultures and languages to establish eastern Tibet, or Do Kham ('Do', the convergence of rivers and valleys; 'Kham', frontier). Kham was traditionally referred to as Chushi Gangdruk, i.e. 'The Four Rivers and Six Ranges' and 'The Four Great Valleys'. Responsible for introducing Buddhism to Tibet, King Songtsen Gampo (reign 629–649) built twelve 'border-taming' temples in Kham, and his 4th wife Wencheng Gongzhu is credited with commissioning Buddhist structures while traveling through Kham in 640–641, from her home in China to Central Tibet.

During the Imperial era, both Nyingma school and Bon monasteries were located, especially in Nyarong Valley, among pastoral and agricultural-based polities ruled by local chieftains, polities which included merchant as well as Mongol and Chinese populations. Notable Tibetan Buddhist art from this era, dating from 804 or 816, includes carved stone statues of Buddha Vairocana.

Following a power struggle in the mid-9th century, Tibet separated into independent kingdoms.

=== 13th to 17th centuries ===
Kham was not controlled by a single king and remained a patchwork of kingdoms, tribes, and chiefdoms whose bases of authority were constantly shifting. A dual system of secular and Buddhist polities continued. In 1270, the Sakya school's lama Tonstul, a student of Sakya Pandita, established a monastery in Kham while both Kagyu and Sakya monasteries were located in the northern plains, including Gonjo and Lingtsang, which accompanied the earlier Nyingma and Bon monasteries of Kham.

In 1639, Güshri Khan, a supporter of the Dalai Lama, invaded with Mongolian troops and defeated the powerful King of Beri in Kham. In 1655, Ngawang Phuntsok, a student of the Dalai Lama, founded Gonsar Monastery, the first of the 13 Gelug monasteries in the Hor States, with the support of the kingdom of Degé. By 1677, many Gelug monasteries had been built when the 5th Dalai Lama finalized Kham's Sino-Tibetan border location between Ming dynasty China and Tibet reunified under the Khoshut Khanate, resulting in Kham being ascribed to Tibet's authority.

The major independent polities included the Chakla, Degé, the Lingtsang, Nangchen and the Lhatok. Other important polities included Chamdo, Batang, Mili, and the Hor States.

=== 18th century ===
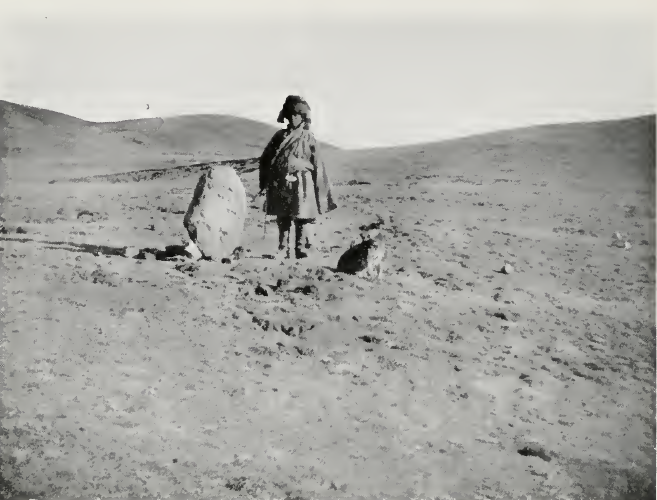
Boundary pillar between Tibet and China at Bum La (Ningching Shan), west of Batang (Teichman, 1922)

In 1717, the Mongol Dzungar Khanate invaded Tibet and other Asian regions. The Qing Chinese army likewise invaded and defeated the Dzungars. This led to the redrawing of the Sino-Tibetan boundary of 1677, which had followed the edge of the Tibetan Plateau. The frontier line changed in either 1725 or 1726 to follow the Dri River (Jinsha River, Upper Yangtze), while the Kham region on the eastern bank became Qing domain. There, hereditary chieftains were bestowed honorific titles of tusi, and obligated to fight alongside the Qing army in other Kham battles between chieftains.

Earlier in 1724, an area of Qinghai (Kokonor) was established within Do Kham. The eastern Kham Qing domain was later incorporated into neighboring Chinese provinces.

=== 19th century ===
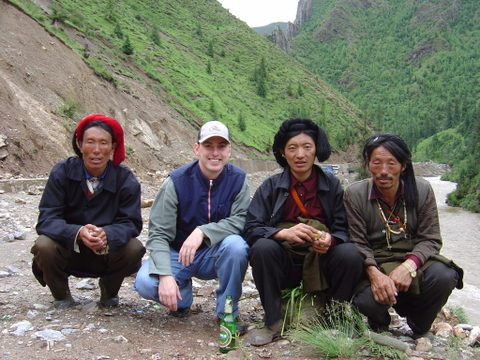
Kham men with western tourist

In 1837, a minor chieftain Gompo Namgyal, of Nyarong in eastern Kham, began expanding his control regionally and launched offensives against the Hor States, Litang, Degé, the Chakla and Batang, becoming the paramount power in the region. China sent troops in against Namgyal which were defeated in 1849, and additional troops were not dispatched. Chinese military posts were present along the trading route, but "did not have any authority over the native chiefs". By 1862, Namgyal blocked trade routes from China to Central Tibet, and sent troops into China.

Local chieftains had appealed to both the Lhasa and the Qing Manchu governments for help against Namgyal. The Tibetan authorities sent an army in 1863, and defeated Namgyal then killed him at his Nyarong fort by 1865. Central Tibet reasserted its authority over the northern parts of Kham and established the Office of the Tibetan High Commissioner to govern. Tibet also reclaimed Nyarong, Degé and the Hor States north of Nyarong. China recalled their forces. It appears to have been accepted by the Manchu Tongzhi Emperor.

Then in 1896, the Qing Governor of Sichuan attempted to gain control of Nyarong valley during a military attack. After his defeat, the Qing agreed to the withdrawal of Chinese forces and the "territory was returned to the direct rule of Lhasa".

=== Early 20th century ===
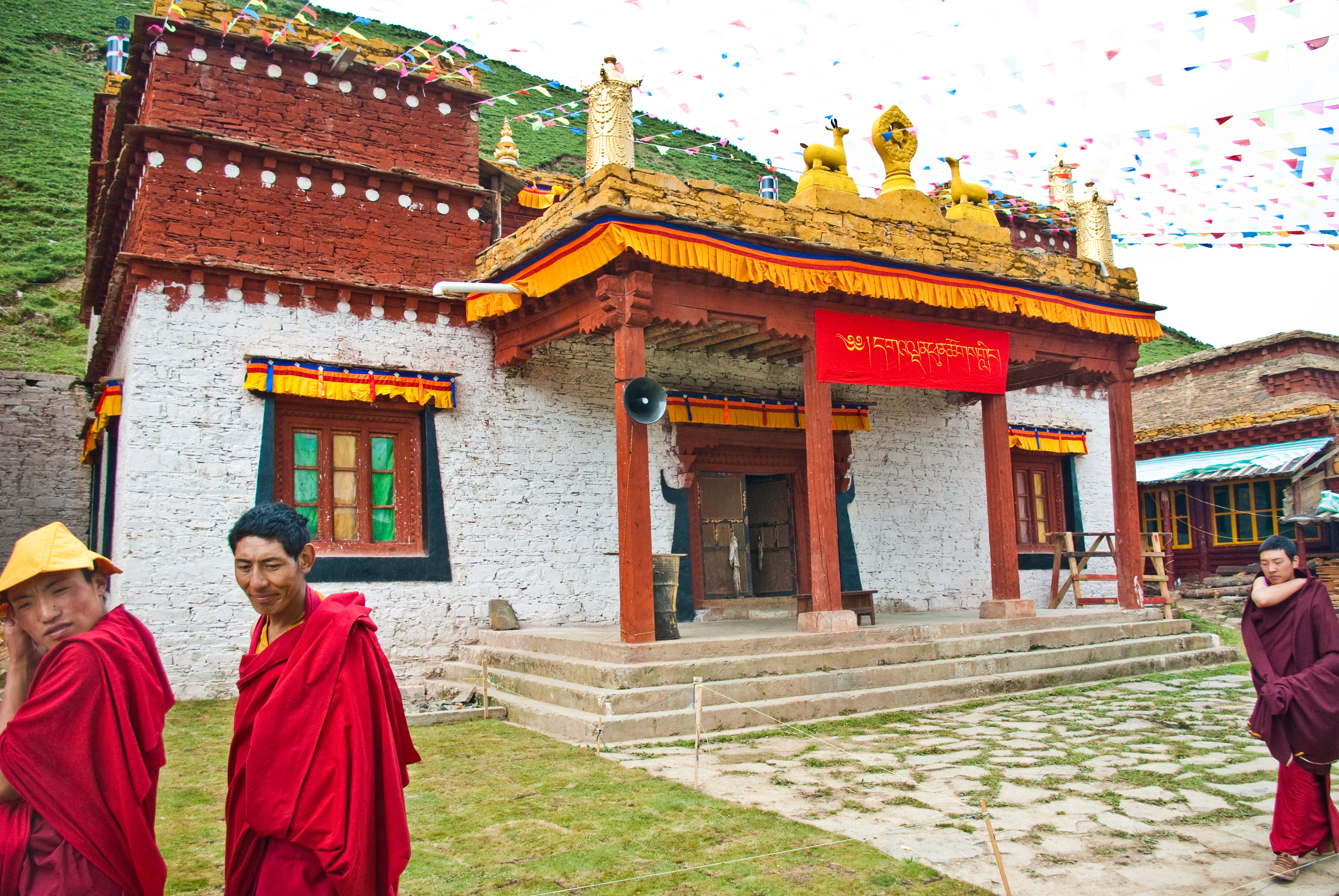
Monastery in Kham

From 1904 to 1911, China decided to reassert its control over the previously re-ceded section of Kham, and to push further into the region soon after the invasion of Tibet by the British army under Francis Younghusband in 1904. The British invasion alarmed the Qing rulers in China, and they sent Fengquan (鳳全) to Kham to initiate land reforms and reduce the numbers of monks. An anti-foreigner and anti-Qing uprising in Batang led to Fengquan's death, while Chinese fields were burned.

The Qing then undertook punitive campaigns in Kham under Manchu army commander Zhao Erfeng, also the Governor of Xining, where he earned the nickname of "the Butcher of Kham". In 1905 or 1908 Zhao began executing monks and destroying many monasteries in Kham and Amdo, implementing an early "sinicization" of the region:

He abolished the powers of the Tibetan local leaders and appointed Chinese magistrates in their places. He introduced new laws that limited the number of lamas and deprived monasteries of their temporal power and inaugurated schemes for having the land cultivated by Chinese immigrants. Zhao's methods in eastern Tibet uncannily prefigured the Communist policies nearly half a century later. They were aimed at the extermination of the Tibetan clergy, the assimilation of territory and repopulation of the Tibetan plateaus with poor peasants from Sichuan. Like the later Chinese conquerors, Zhao's men looted and destroyed Tibetan monasteries, melted down religious images and tore up sacred texts to use to line the soles of their boots and, as the Communists were also to do later, Zhao Erfeng worked out a comprehensive scheme for the redevelopment of Tibet that covered military training reclamation work, secular education, trade and administration.

After the fall of the Qing Dynasty, Zhao was stripped of his post and executed by the revolutionary commander Yin Changheng.

A year before the collapse of the Qing, the Beijing-appointed amban Zhong Ying invaded Lhasa with the Chinese army in February 1910 in order to gain control of Tibet and establish direct Chinese rule. The 13th Dalai Lama escaped to British India, and returned before China surrendered via a letter from the amban to the Dalai Lama in the summer of 1912. On 13 February 1913, the Dalai Lama declared Tibet an independent nation, and announced the end of the historic "priest-patron" relationship between Tibet and China. The amban and Chinese army were expelled, while other Chinese populations were given three years to depart.

By late 1913, Kham and Amdo remained largely occupied by China. Tibet proposed re-establishing the border between Tibet and China at the Dri River during the Simla Conference with Britain and China, while Britain countered with another proposal which was initialed but not ratified.

In 1917, the Tibetan army defeated China in battles at Chamdo, west of the Dri River, which were halted after Britain refused to sell Tibet additional armaments.

=== Tibetan independence and Republic of China ===
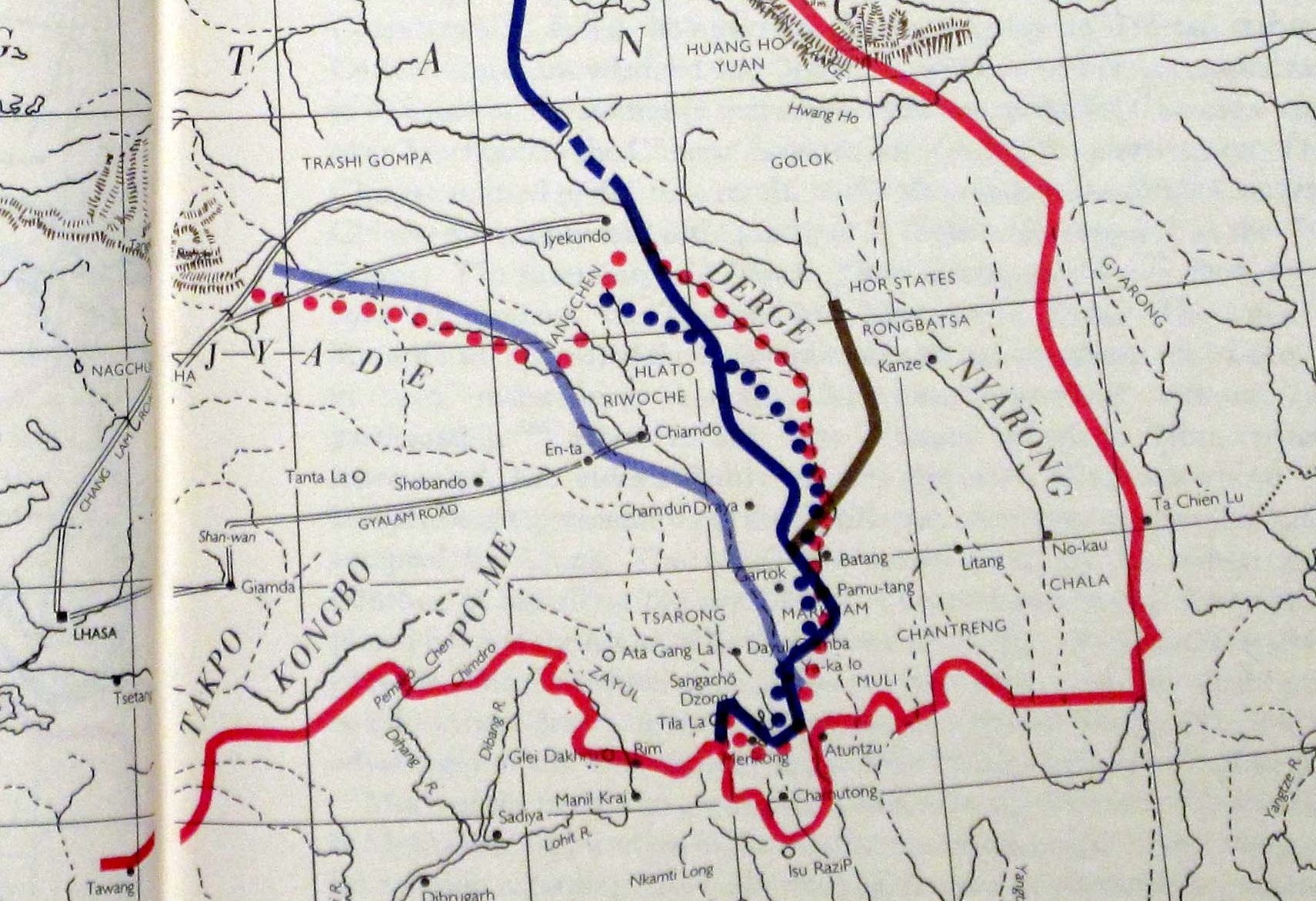
ROC's control in Kham: Light blue line on the west represents the boundary in 1912–1917, after which the ROC was pushed back to the brown line during 1918–1932. By 1945, it arrived at the dotted red line. The dark blue was the Simla Convention boundary that ROC turned down.

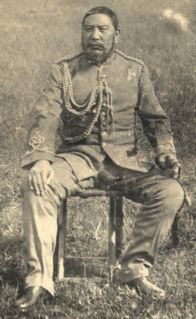
Tibetan government's Kalon Lama Jampa Tendar, Governor General of Kham

The official position of the British Government was it would not intervene between China and Tibet and would only recognize the de facto government of China within Tibet at this time. In his history of Tibet, Bell wrote that "the Tibetans were abandoned to Chinese aggression, an aggression for which the British Military Expedition to Lhasa and subsequent retreat [and consequent power vacuum within Tibet] were primarily responsible".

In 1932, an agreement signed between Chinese warlord Liu Wenhui and Tibetan forces formalized the partition of Kham into two regions: Eastern Kham, which was administered by Chinese forces, and Western Kham, which was administered by Tibet. Eastern Kham subsequently became the actual area of control of China's Xikang province. The border between eastern and western Kham is the Upper Yangtze – Dri Chu in Tibetan and Jinsha Jiang respectively, in Chinese.

Tenpay Gyaltsan, a Khampa who was 5 years old, was selected as the fifth Jamyang Hutuktu in 1921.

The Kham Pandatsang family led the 1934 Khamba rebellion against the Tibetan government in Lhasa. The Kuomintang reached out to the Khampas, whose relationship with the Dalai Lama's government in Lhasa were deteriorating badly. The Khampa revolutionary leader Pandatsang Rapga founded the Tibet Improvement Party to overthrow the Tibetan government and establish a Tibetan Republic as part of China. In addition to using the Khampa's against the Tibetan Government in Lhasa, the Chinese Kuomintang also used them against the Communists during the Chinese Civil War.

The Kuomintang formulated a plan where three Khampa divisions would be assisted by the Panchen Lama to oppose the Communists.

Kuomintang intelligence reported that some Tibetan tusi chiefs and the Khampa Su Yonghe controlled 80,000 troops in Sichuan, Qinghai, and Tibet. They hoped to use them against the Communist army.

The Chinese Kuomintang (Nationalists) also enlisted Khampas to join their military.

The Chinese Kuomintang also sought the Khampas help in defending Sichuan from Japan during World War 2, since the temporary capital was located there. A Khampa member of the Mongolian Tibetan Academy was Han Jiaxiang.

300 "Khampa bandits" were enlisted into the Kuomintang Consolatory Commission military in Sichuan, where they were part of the effort of the central government of China to penetrated and destabilize the local Han warlords such as Liu Wenhui. The Chinese government sought to exercise full control over frontier areas against the warlords. The Consoltary Commission forces were used to battle the Communist Red Army but were defeated when their religious leader was captured by Communist forces.

The Republic of China government also used Khampa traders to operate secret transports between different places.

Kesang Tsering was sent by the Chinese to Batang to take control of Xikang, where he formed a local government. He was spread there for the purpose of propagating the Three People's Principle to the Khampa.

=== People's Republic of China ===
In 1950, following the defeat of the Kuomintang rulers of China by communist forces in the Chinese Civil War, the People's Liberation Army invaded western Kham. Western Kham was then set up as a separate Qamdo Territory, then merged into Tibet Autonomous Region in 1965. Meanwhile, Xikang, comprising eastern Kham, was merged into Sichuan in 1955. The border between Sichuan and Tibet Autonomous Region has remained at the Yangtze River.

== Notable people ==
- Khandro Lhamo
- Guru Tashi
- Gombo Namgye
- Tsewang Lhamo
- Khenpo Yeshe Phuntsok

== See also ==
- Kingdom of Derge
- List of traditional regions of Tibet
