= Garzê County =

Garzê County 甘孜县 • དཀར་མཛེས་རྫོང་། Kardze, Ganzi
- County
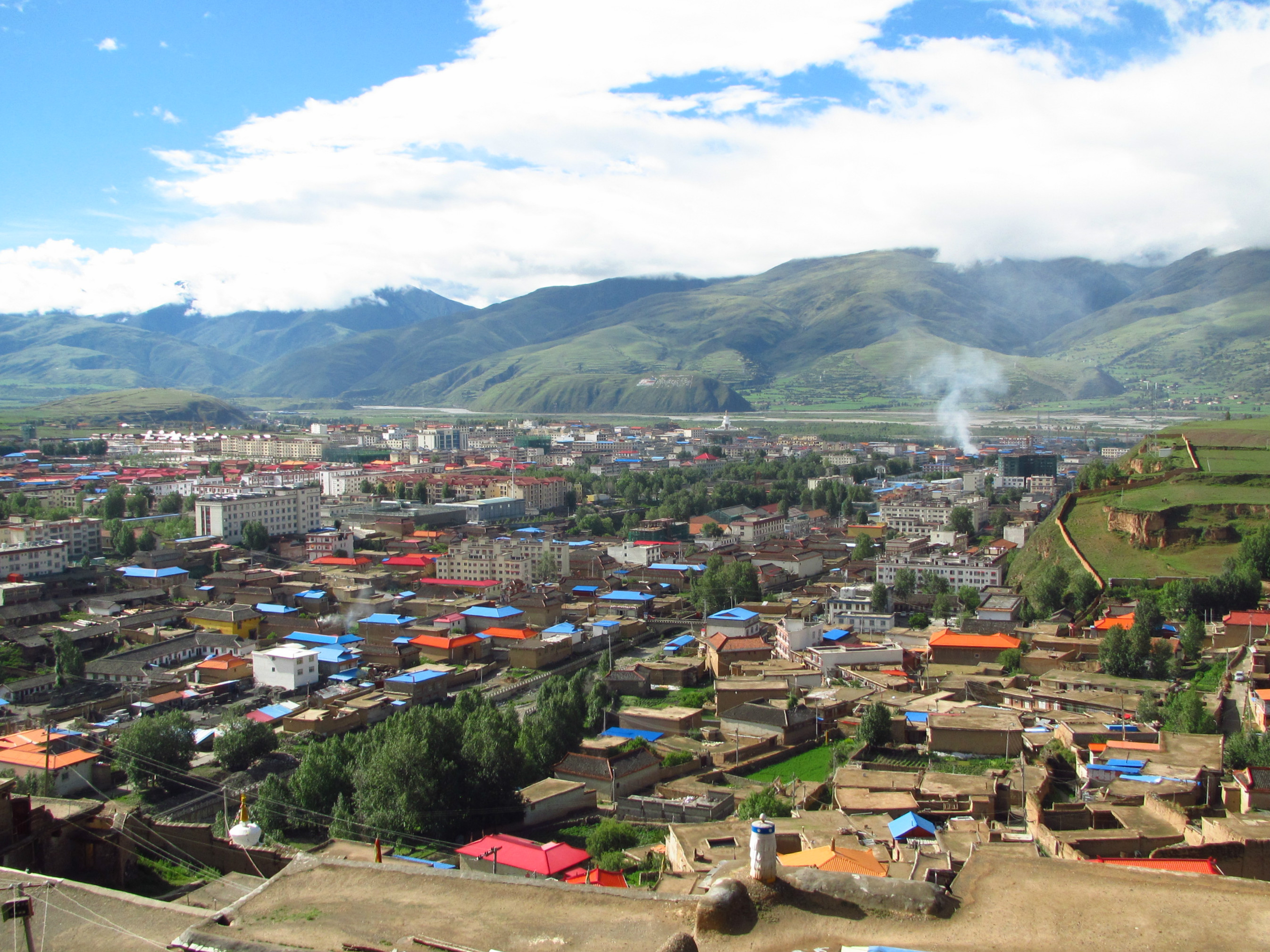
- View of Garzê Town

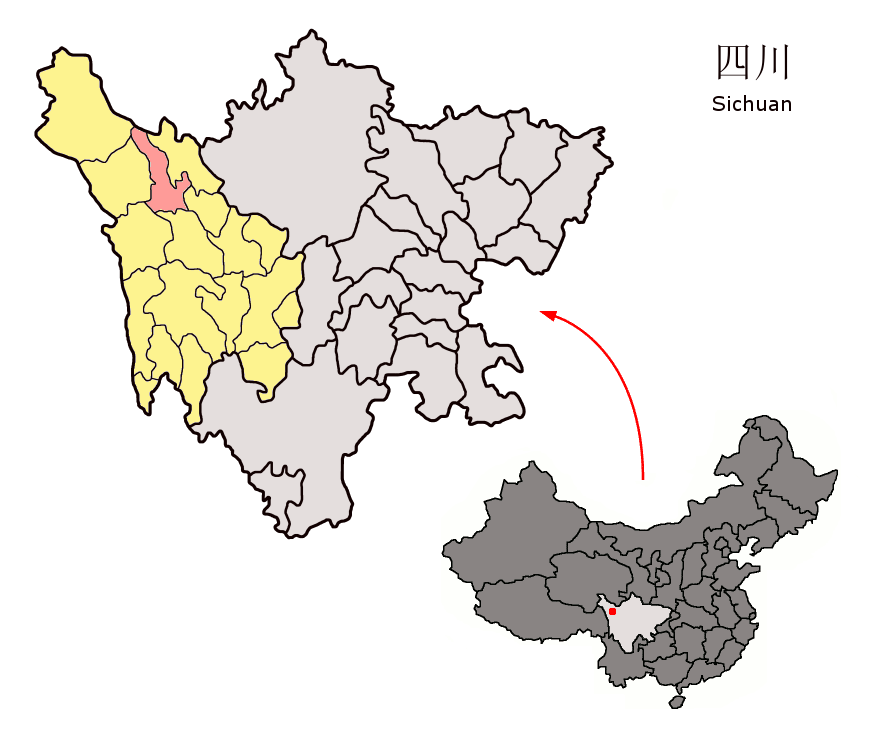
- Location of Garzê County (red) within Garzê Prefecture (yellow) and Sichuan

- Location of the seat in Sichuan Garzê County (China)
- Coordinates: 31°37′23″N 100°00′04″E
- Country: China
- Province: Sichuan
- Autonomous prefecture: Garzê
- County seat: Garzê Town

Area
  - Total: 7,364 km^{2} (2,843 sq mi)
- Highest elevation: 5,688 m (18,661 ft)
- Lowest elevation: 3,325 m (10,909 ft)

Population (2020)
  - Total: 72,698
  - Density: 9.872/km^{2} (25.57/sq mi)
- Postal code: 624000
- Website: www.ganzi.gov.cn

Garzê County

Chinese name
- Simplified Chinese: 甘孜县
- Traditional Chinese: 甘孜縣
Transcriptions
Standard Mandarin
- Hanyu Pinyin: Gānzī Xiàn

Tibetan name
- Tibetan: དཀར་མཛེས་རྫོང་།
Transcriptions
- Wylie: dkar mdzes rdzong
- Tibetan Pinyin: Garzê Zong

Garzê County or Kardze County (Tibetan: དཀར་མཛེས་རྫོང་།, Wylie: dkar mdzes rdzong), called Ganzi County in Chinese (Chinese: 甘孜县; pinyin: Gānzī xiàn), is one of the 18 subdivisions of the Garzê Tibetan Autonomous Prefecture, in northwestern Sichuan province, China. The Yalong River passes just south of the town of Garzê, also known as Ganzi, the capital of the county. The town has about 16,920 inhabitants (2010), many of them ethnic Tibetans, and is famous for its Tibetan lamasery.. Historically, it is part of the Tibetan cultural region of Kham and now defunct province of Xikang (or Sikang). It lies on the northern section of the Sichuan-Tibet Highway.

== Geography and climate ==
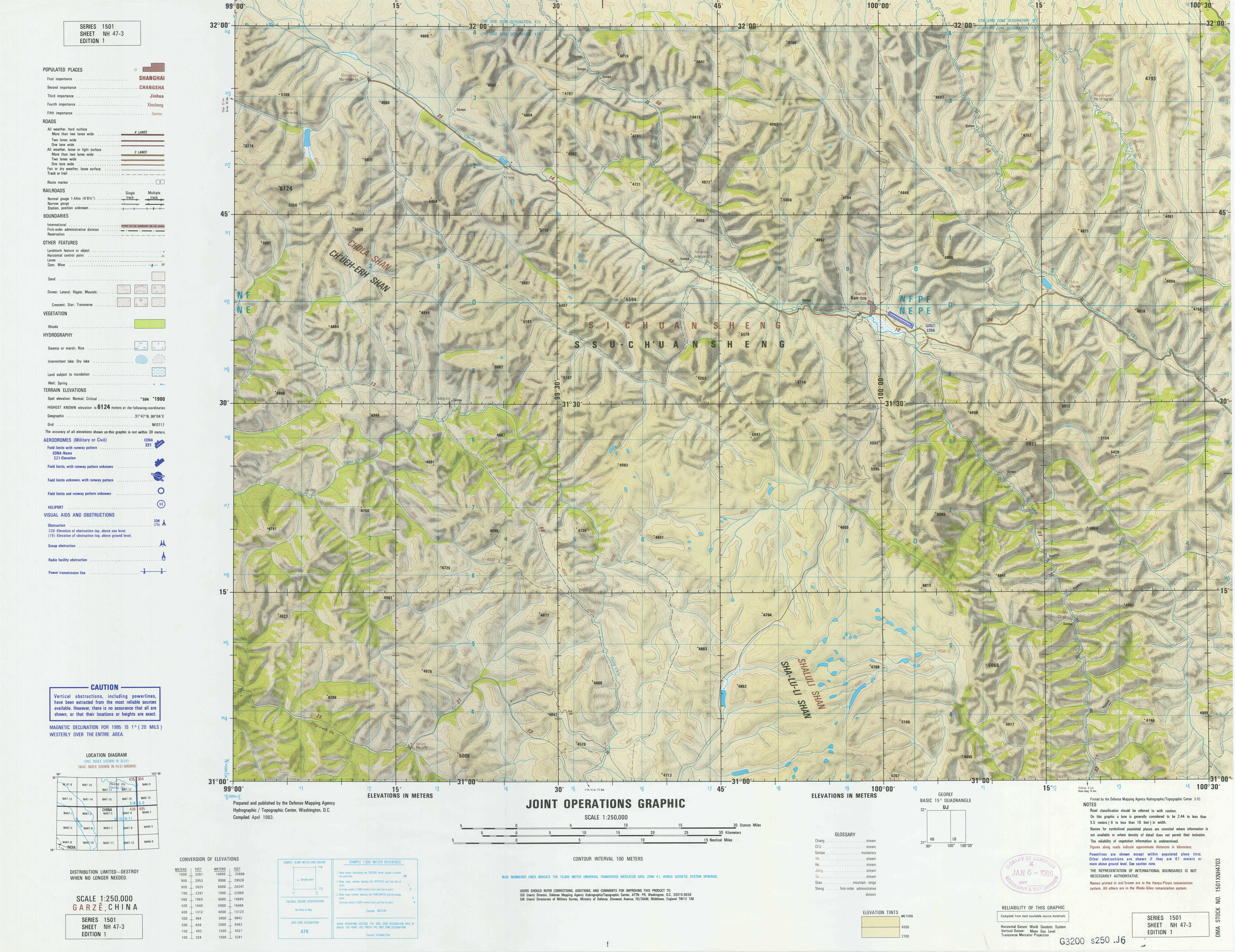

Due to its elevation, Garzê County has a monsoon-influenced humid continental climate (Köppen Dwb) and subarctic climate, with cold but very dry winters, and warm summers with frequent rain. The monthly 24-hour average temperature ranges from −3.9 °C (25.0 °F) in January to 14.2 °C (57.6 °F) in July, while the annual mean is 5.93 °C (42.7 °F). Over two-thirds of the annual precipitation of 646 mm (25.4 in) occurs from June thru September. With monthly percent possible sunshine ranging from 49% in July to 74% in November and December, the county seat receives abundant, outside of summer, sunshine, totalling 2,620 hours annually. The diurnal temperature variation is large, averaging 14.5 °C (26.1 °F) annually.

Climate data for Garzê County, elevation 3,394 m (11,135 ft), (1991–2020 normals, extremes 1951–present)
Month	Jan	Feb	Mar	Apr	May	Jun	Jul	Aug	Sep	Oct	Nov	Dec	Year
Record high °C (°F)	20.7 (69.3)	21.5 (70.7)	25.3 (77.5)	27.0 (80.6)	29.0 (84.2)	31.7 (89.1)	29.7 (85.5)	30.7 (87.3)	28.7 (83.7)	25.9 (78.6)	21.3 (70.3)	18.9 (66.0)	31.7 (89.1)
Mean daily maximum °C (°F)	6.3 (43.3)	8.7 (47.7)	11.6 (52.9)	15.1 (59.2)	18.7 (65.7)	20.5 (68.9)	21.6 (70.9)	21.8 (71.2)	19.8 (67.6)	15.1 (59.2)	10.6 (51.1)	6.9 (44.4)	14.7 (58.5)
Daily mean °C (°F)	−3.5 (25.7)	−0.4 (31.3)	3.2 (37.8)	6.9 (44.4)	10.9 (51.6)	13.4 (56.1)	14.5 (58.1)	14.2 (57.6)	11.8 (53.2)	6.9 (44.4)	0.9 (33.6)	−3.2 (26.2)	6.3 (43.3)
Mean daily minimum °C (°F)	−10.5 (13.1)	−7.2 (19.0)	−3.3 (26.1)	0.3 (32.5)	4.5 (40.1)	8.1 (46.6)	9.3 (48.7)	8.8 (47.8)	6.7 (44.1)	1.5 (34.7)	−5.4 (22.3)	−10.0 (14.0)	0.2 (32.4)
Record low °C (°F)	−26.5 (−15.7)	−23.6 (−10.5)	−16.4 (2.5)	−9.6 (14.7)	−5.3 (22.5)	−2.4 (27.7)	0.6 (33.1)	−1.1 (30.0)	−4.4 (24.1)	−9.5 (14.9)	−21.4 (−6.5)	−28.7 (−19.7)	−28.7 (−19.7)
Average precipitation mm (inches)	5.0 (0.20)	9.9 (0.39)	20.9 (0.82)	36.4 (1.43)	79.0 (3.11)	139.3 (5.48)	121.0 (4.76)	94.8 (3.73)	104.4 (4.11)	52.1 (2.05)	10.3 (0.41)	3.4 (0.13)	676.5 (26.62)
Average precipitation days (≥ 0.1 mm)	3.8	5.6	8.8	13.4	18.2	22.7	20.8	18.2	18.4	13.6	4.8	2.7	151
Average snowy days	5.4	7.9	11.0	8.3	1.9	0.2	0	0	0.1	4.6	5.7	4.2	49.3
Average relative humidity (%)	42	43	46	51	55	65	68	67	68	64	53	47	56
Mean monthly sunshine hours	215.3	195.0	215.5	212.8	223.5	197.8	200.6	198.9	204.2	213.7	229.7	232.6	2,539.6
Percentage possible sunshine	67	62	58	54	52	47	47	49	56	61	73	74	58
Source 1: China Meteorological AdministrationAll-time August HighExtremes
Source 2: Weather China

== Administrative divisions ==
Garzê County is divided into 3 towns and 18 townships:

Name	Simplified Chinese	Hanyu Pinyin	Tibetan	Wylie	Administrative division code
Towns
Garzê Town (Ganzi)	甘孜镇	Gānzī Zhèn	དཀར་མཛེས་གྲོང་རྡལ།	dkar mdzes grong rdal	513328100
Calung Town (Chalong)	查龙镇	Chálóng Zhèn	ཚྭ་ལུང་གྲོང་རྡལ།	tshwa lung grong rdal	513328101
Dainma Town (Laima)	来马镇	Láimǎ Zhèn	འདན་མ་གྲོང་རྡལ།	'dan ma grong rdal	513328102
Townships
Garrag Township (Gala)	呷拉乡	Gālā Xiāng	དཀར་རགས་ཤང་།	dkar rags shang	513328200
Sêrqudêng Township (Sexidi)	色西底乡	Sèxīdǐ Xiāng	གསེར་ཆུ་སྟེང་ཤང་།	gser chu steng shang	513328201
Dando Township (Nanduo)	南多乡	Nánduō Xiāng	མདའ་མདོ་ཤང་།	mda' mdo shang	513328202
Sêrkar Township (Shengkang)	生康乡	Shēngkāng Xiāng	གསེར་མཁར་ཤང་།	gser mkhar shang	513328203
Konglam Township (Kolam, Gonglong)	贡隆乡	Gònglóng Xiāng	གོང་ལམ་ཤང་།	gong lam shang	513328204
Zakog Township (Zhake)	扎科乡	Zhākē Xiāng	རྫ་ཁོག་ཤང་།	rdza khog shang	513328205
Qêsêr Township (Xise)	昔色乡	Xīsè Xiāng	བྱེ་གསེར་ཤང་།	bye gser shang	513328207
Kargang Township (Kagong)	卡攻乡	Kǎgōng Xiāng	མཁར་སྒང་ཤང་།	mkhar sgang shang	513328208
Ringo Township (Renguo)	仁果乡	Rénguǒ Xiāng	རི་མགོ་ཤང་།	ri mgo shang	513328209
Doba Township (Tuoba)	拖坝乡	Tuōbà Xiāng	ལྟོ་པ་ཤང་།	lto pa shang	513328210
Tingka Township	庭卡乡	Tíngkǎ Xiāng	ཐིང་ཁ་ཤང་།	thing kha shang	513328212
Xarqog Township (Xiaxiong)	下雄乡	Xiàxióng Xiāng	ཤར་ཕྱོགས་ཤང་།	shar phyogs shang	513328213
Sitangda Township (Sitongda)	四通达乡	Sìtōngdá Xiāng	ཟི་ཐང་མདའ་ཤང་།	zi thang mda' shang	513328214
Dotog Township (Dodi, Duodu)	夺多乡	Duóduō Xiāng	རྡོ་ཐོག་ཤང་།	rdo thog shang	513328215
Nyikog Township (Nike)	泥柯乡	Níkē Xiāng	ཉི་ཁོག་ཤང་།	nyi khog shang	513328216
Caza Township (Chazha)	茶扎乡	Cházhā Xiāng	ཚ་རྩྭ་ཤང་།	tsha rtswa shang	513328217
Dadoi Township (Dade)	大德乡	Dàdé Xiāng	ཟླ་སྟོད་ཤང་།	zla stod shang	513328218
Kyaglung Township (Karlung, Kalong)	卡龙乡	Kǎlóng Xiāng	འཁྱགས་ལུང་ཤང་།	'khyags lung shang	513328219

== Transport ==
- China National Highway 317
- Ganzi Gesa'er Airport
