= Mok =

Family name

- Pronunciation: Various (e.g. /mɔk/, /mok/, /mɒk/)
- Language: Chinese (Cantonese, Teochew), Dutch, Hungarian, Korean

Other names
- Variant forms: Chinese: Mo, Mu, Bok, Muk; Dutch: Mock

Mok is a surname in various cultures. It may be a transcription of several Chinese surnames in their Cantonese or Teochew pronunciations, a Dutch surname, a Hungarian surname, or a Korean surname.

== Origins ==
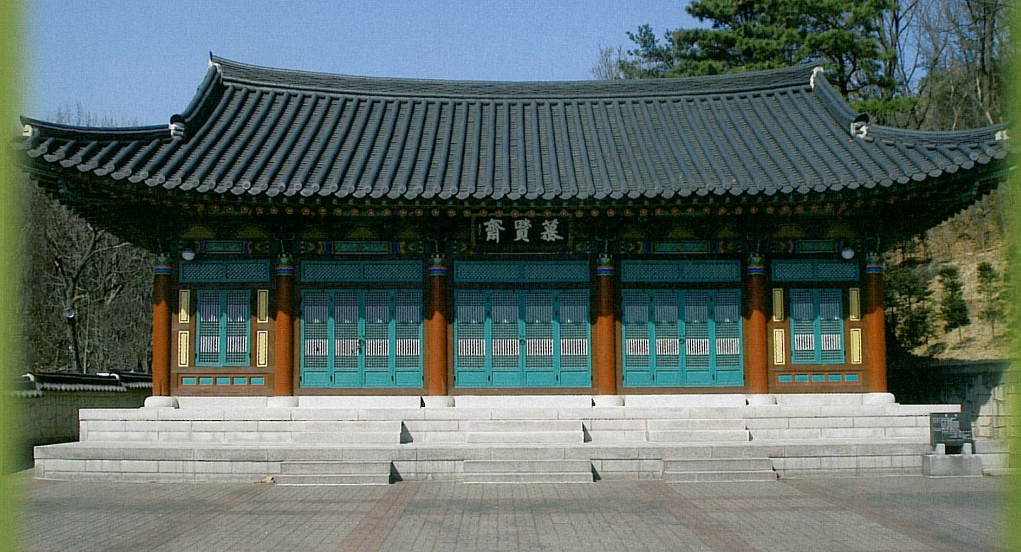
Part of the Confucian ritual hall (Korean: 재실; Hanja: 齋室; RR: jaesil) of the Mok clan of Sacheon, South Gyeongsang Province, South Korea

Mok may transcribe the pronunciation, in different varieties of Chinese, of some Chinese surnames spelled as Mo or Mu in Pinyin (which reflects the Mandarin Chinese pronunciation), including:

- Mò (莫), spelled Mok based on its pronunciation in Cantonese (Jyutping: Mok6; Cantonese Yale: Mohk; IPA: /mɔːk̚²/) or Teochew (Peng'im: Mog8; IPA: /mok̚⁴/).
- Mù (穆), homophonous with the first surname above in Teochew. According to Patrick Hanks, some Cantonese speakers in the United Kingdom and the United States also spell this name as Mok, though Muk is probably a more common transcription of the Cantonese pronunciation (Jyutping: Muk6; Cantonese Yale: Muhk; IPA: /mʊk̚²/).
- Mù (牧), homophonous with the first surname above in Teochew.
- Mù (睦), homophonous with the first surname above in Teochew.

The Dutch surname Mok is a variant spelling of Mock. The surname Mock might have originated from Moch, a clipping of Mochel (mohel).

The Hungarian surname Mók was originally a given name. That given name might be a hypocorism of Mózes, which is the Hungarian form of the given names Moises or Moses.

There is only one hanja used to write the modern Korean surname Mok: Hwamokhal Mok (睦; 화목할 목), meaning 'harmonious'. The bearers of this surname are almost all members of the Sacheon Mok clan. That clan is so named for its bon-gwan (clan hometown) of Sacheon, South Gyeongsang Province, a city which became part of South Korea after the division of the Korean peninsula. Its members claim descent from Mok Hyo-gi, an official under Gojong of Goryeo. Historically, another hanja meaning 'tree' (木; 나무 목; Namu Mok) had also been used as a surname by the Mok clan of Baekje, but this surname is no longer extant in the Korean peninsula.

== Statistics ==
In the Netherlands, there were 421 people with the surname Mok as of 2007, up from 112 in 1947.

The 2000 South Korean Census found 8,191 people in 2,493 households with the surname Mok; all but ten of those people stated that they were members of the Sacheon Mok clan.

According to statistics cited by Patrick Hanks, there were 450 people on the island of Great Britain and nine on the island of Ireland with the surname Mok as of 2011; no bearers of the surname were recorded in Great Britain in 1881.

The 2010 United States census found 2,707 people with the surname Mok, making it the 11,597th-most-common name in the country. This represented an increase from 2,134 (13,137th-most-common) in the 2000 Census. In both censuses, about nine-tenths of the bearers of the surname identified as Asian, and five percent as White.

== People ==
=== Cambodian surname ម៉ុក ===
- Mok Mareth (ម៉ុក ម៉ារ៉េត; born 1948), Cambodian politician
- Theavy Mok (ម៉ុក ធាវី; born 1963), Cambodian plastic surgeon

=== Chinese surname 莫 ===
- Mok Kwai-lan (莫桂蘭; 1892–1982), fourth spouse of Lingnan martial arts grandmaster Wong Fei-hung
- Mok Chun Wah (莫振華; born 1929), Hong Kong footballer
- Mok Cheuk Wing (莫卓榮; born 1949), Hong Kong judo athlete
- Mok Ying-fan (莫應帆; born 1951), Hong Kong politician
- Ngaiming Mok (莫毅明; born 1956), Hong Kong mathematician
- Warren Mok (莫華倫; born 1958), Macau operatic tenor
- Max Mok (莫少聰; born 1960), Hong Kong actor
- Mok Ka Sha (莫卡莎; born 1962), Hong Kong table tennis player
- Mok Kit Keung (莫傑強; c. 1963–2021), Hong Kong chef
- Charles Mok (莫乃光; born 1964), Hong Kong internet entrepreneur and politician
- Hoyan Mok (莫可欣); born 1969), Hong Kong actress who won the 1993 Miss Hong Kong Pageant
- Karen Mok (莫文蔚; born 1970), Hong Kong actress and pop singer
- Patricia Mok (莫小玲; born 1971), Singaporean actress
- Rosanda Mok (莫嘉嫻; born 1972), Hong Kong politician
- Zandra Mok (莫宜端; born 1973), Hong Kong television reporter and politician
- Tze Ming Mok (莫志明; born 1978), New Zealand writer
- Monica Mok (莫小棋; born 1983), Beijing-born Australian actress
- Evelyn Mok (莫悅玲; born 1987), Swedish comedian
- Mok Ying Ren (莫英任; born 1988), Singaporean triathlete and long-distance runner
- Juanita Mok (莫宛螢; born 1995), Hong Kong taijiquan athlete
- Andrew Mok 莫家俊; born 2005), known professionally as YaLocalOffgod, Hong Kong designer
- Mok Hing Ling (莫慶靈), Chinese modern ink painter
- May Mok (莫美華), Hong Kong sound effects editor
- Philip Mok (莫國泰), Hong Kong professor of electrical engineering

=== Korean surname 목 ===
- Mok Jin-seok (목진석; 睦鎭碩; born 1980), South Korean Go player
- Mok Un-ju (born 1981), North Korean gymnast
- Yebin Mok (born 1984), South Korean-born American figure skater

=== Other or unknown ===
- Abraham Mok (1888–1944), Dutch gymnast murdered in the Holocaust
- Jack Mok (born 1935), South African rower
- Judith Mok (1954–2004), Dutch soprano
- Clement Mok (born 1958), Canadian graphic designer
- Ken Mok (born 1961), American television producer
- Al Mok, American computer scientist
- Lawrence Mok, Singaporean-born Canadian politician
