= Mock (surname) =

Mock is a surname. Notable people with the surname include:

- Alois Mock (1934–2017), Austrian politician
- Brian Mock (d. 1992), American gay man and murder victim
- Chad Mock (born 1984), American football player
- Chance Mock (born 1981), American football player
- Evan Mock (born 1997), American model, actor and skateboarder
- Freida Lee Mock, American film director and producer
- Garrett Mock (born 1983), American baseball player
- George Mock (1907–2001), American labor leader
- Hans Mock (1906–1982), Austrian footballer
- Henry P. Mock (born 1936/1937), American politician
- Janet Mock (born 1983), American author
- Jerrie Mock (1925–2014), American aviator
- John Mock, American musician
- Karen Mock, Canadian activist
- Owen Mock, American computer programmer
- Richard Mock (1944–2006), American artist
- Russell Mock, American judge
- Ron Mock, American Quaker
- Sai Wing Mock (1879–1941), Chinese-American mob boss
- Vanessa Mock (born 1975), German journalist

Fictional characters:

- Eberhard Mock (1883–1960), fictional detective

== See also ==
- Manfred Möck (born 1959), German actor
