= Mu Qing =

Mu Qing may refer to:

- Mu Qing (tusi) (1569–1597), 19th Tusi of Lijiang
- Mu Qing (journalist) (1921–2003), Chinese journalist, author and photographer
