= Mu (surname) =

Mu is the pinyin romanization of several Chinese surnames.

Mù (穆) was listed 98th on the Song dynasty list of the Hundred Family Surnames.

Mù (牧) was listed 225th on the Song dynasty list of the Hundred Family Surnames.

Mù (慕) was listed 329th on the Song dynasty list of the Hundred Family Surnames.

There are also surnames Mù (木), Mǔ (母), Mù (目), Mù (沐), Mù (睦) and Mù (暮), which are not in the Hundred Family Surnames list. Among Hui people, Mu is a sinified version of Muhammad. Related surname with Ma and Mo.

Western like as similar surname: Musa, Murphy, Murray, Muller, Mullen, Murdoch, Musk

== Notable people ==
=== Surname Mù (穆) ===
It is the 98th name on the Hundred Family Surnames poem.

188th name in 2013 shared by 0.048% of the population or 640,000 people with the province with the most being Guizhou.

- King Mu of Zhou, the fifth king of the Zhou dynasty.
- Duke Mu of Qin, was a duke of Qin (659–621 BC).
- Duke Mu of Xu, the ruler of the State of Xu.
- Duchess Mu of Xu, princess of the State of Wey and the first recorded female poet in Chinese history.
- Mu Shiying, Chinese writer
- Mu Qing (journalist), Chinese journalist and politician
- Mu Tiezhu, Chinese basketball player
- Mu Hong (politician), Chinese economist and official
- Mu Guiying, legendary heroine and prominent figure in Generals of the Yang Family legends
- Mu Hong character in the novel Water Margin
- Mu Shun, character in the novel Water Margin
- Mu Nianci, character in the novel The Legend of the Condor Heroes

=== Surname Mù (木) ===
(not among the 400 most surnames)

- Mu Qing (tusi), poet and official in the Ming dynasty
- Mu Zeng, son of Mu Qing
- Mu Wanqing, character in the novel Demi-Gods and Semi-Devils

=== Surname Mǔ (母) ===
344 母 0.010% 13.50 Sichuan

- Mu Guoguang, Chinese opticist and educator.

=== Surname Mù (沐) ===
- Mu Ying, a general in the Ming dynasty.

== See also ==
- Bok (surname)
- Mo (Chinese surname)
- Mo (Korean surname)
