= Wang Shunyou =

Chinese postal worker and politician (1965 – 2021)

- Born: 1965-11; ChinaSichuan ProvinceLiangshan Yi Autonomous PrefectureMuli Tibetan Autonomous County
- Died: 30 May 2021
- Occupation: postman
- Political party: Chinese Communist Party

Wang Shunyou (Chinese: 王顺友; November 1965 – 30 May 2021) was a Chinese postal worker and politician. An ethnic Miao from Muli County in Sichuan Province. He worked for decades as a rural mail carrier for the Muli Tibetan Autonomous County Post Office. He was a member of the Chinese Communist Party (CCP) and served as a delegate to the 18th National Congress of the CCP in 2012.

== Career ==
Wang Shunyou worked as a rural mail carrier for the Muli Tibetan Autonomous County Post Office in Sichuan Province since 1985. He joined the Chinese Communist Party (CCP) in October 2004. He was responsible for delivering mail between Muli County and the townships of Baidiao, Sanjueya, Luobo, and Kala Township.

=== Political roles ===
In 2007, Wang was elected as a delegate to the 9th Sichuan Provincial Congress of the Chinese Communist Party. Later, in 2012, he became a representative in the 18th National Congress of the Chinese Communist Party.

=== Death ===
On May 30, 2021, Wang Shunyou died suddenly from illness in Muli County at the age of 56.

== Awards and honors ==
Wang Shunyou was widely recognized for his decades of service as a rural postal worker. Among the awards are "National May 1st Labor Medal”, “National Model Worker”, “National Outstanding Communist Party Member”, “National Model of Dedication and Contribution”, and “Person of the Year Who Moved China in 2005”.

== Film and television image ==
In July 2006, Wang Shunyou’s life story was adapted into the film ''The Messenger of Shangri-La'' (香巴拉信使). The film starred Qiu Lin as Wang Shunyou and Ermayina as the female lead.
