= Muli Tibetan Autonomous County =

Muli County 木里县 · སྨི་ལི་རྫོང་ · ꃆꆹꑤ
- Autonomous county
- 木里藏族自治县 (Chinese) སྨི་ལི་བོད་རིགས་རང་སྐྱོང་རྫོང (Standard Tibetan) ꃆꆹꀒꋤꊨꏦꏱꅉꑤ (Yi); Muli Tibetan Autonomous County
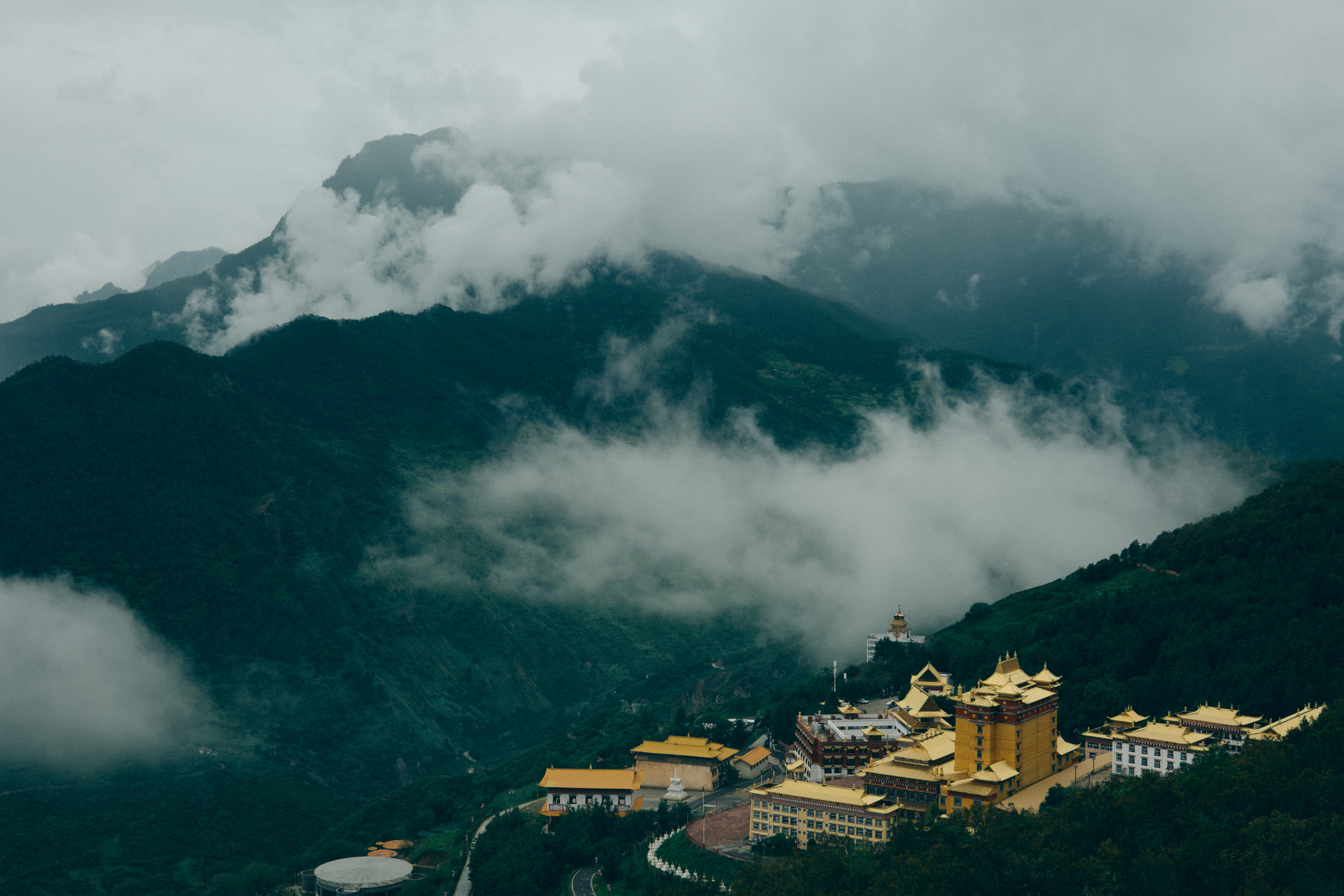

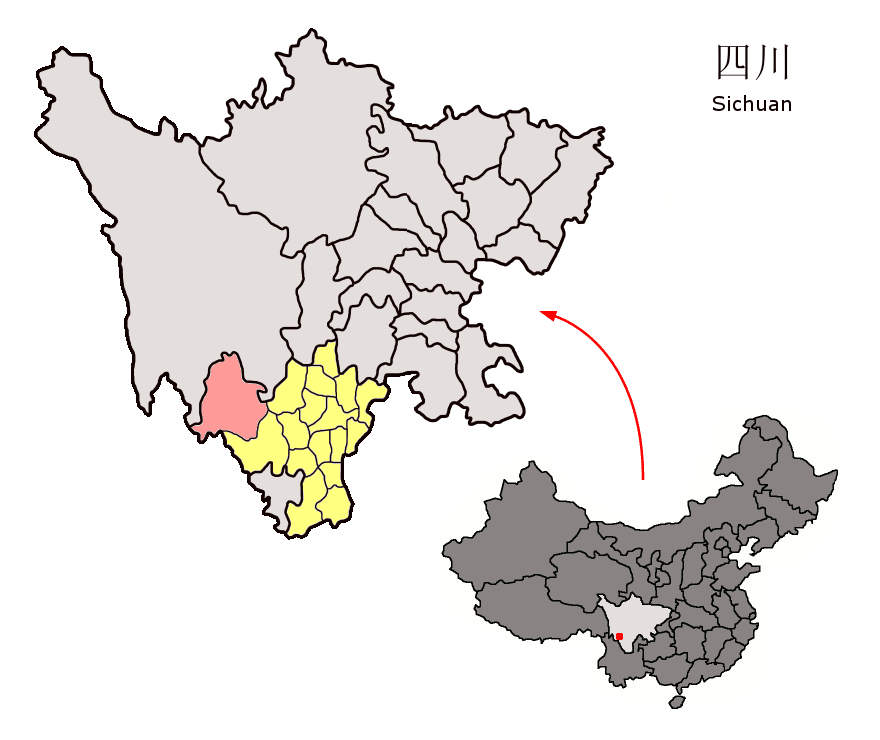
- Location of Muli County (red) within Liangshan Prefecture (yellow) and Sichuan

- Location in Sichuan Muli County (China)
- Coordinates (Muli County government): 27°55′44″N 101°16′49″E
- Country: China
- Province: Sichuan
- Autonomous prefecture: Liangshan
- County seat: Qab'oi (Qiaowa)

Area
  - Total: 13,252 km^{2} (5,117 sq mi)

Population (2020)
  - Total: 122,944
  - Density: 9.2774/km^{2} (24.028/sq mi)
- Website: www.muli.gov.cn

Muli Tibetan Autonomous County

Chinese name
- Simplified Chinese: 木里藏族自治县
- Traditional Chinese: 木里藏族自治縣
Transcriptions
Standard Mandarin
- Hanyu Pinyin: Mùlǐ Zàngzú Zìzhìxiàn

Tibetan name
- Tibetan: སྨི་ལི་བོད་རིགས་རང་སྐྱོང་རྫོང་། or མུ་ལེ་བོད་རིགས་རང་སྐྱོང་རྫོང་།
Transcriptions
- Wylie: smi li bod rigs rang skyong rdzong or mu le bod rigs rang skyong rdzong
- Tibetan Pinyin: Mili Poirig Ranggyong Zong or Mulê Poirig Ranggyong Zong

Mongolian name
- Mongolian script: ᠮᠦ᠋ ᠯᠢ ᠲᠥᠪᠡᠳ ᠦᠨᠳᠦᠰᠦᠲᠡᠨ ᠦ ᠥᠪᠡᠷᠲᠡᠭᠡᠨ ᠵᠠᠰᠠᠬᠤ ᠰᠢᠶᠠᠨ
Transcriptions
- SASM/GNC: mü li töbed ündüsüten-ü öbertegen ǰasaqu siyan

Yi name
- Yi: ꃆꆹꀒꋤꊨꏦꏱꅉꑤ; Romanisation: mup li op zzup zyt jie jux dde xiep

Muli Tibetan Autonomous County (Chinese: 木里藏族自治县; pinyin: Mùlǐ Zàngzú Zìzhìxiàn; Tibetan: སྨི་ལི་བོད་རིགས་རང་སྐྱོང་རྫོང smi-li rang-skyong-rdzong; Yi: ꃆꆹꀒꋤꊨꏦꏱꅉꑤ mup li op zzup zyt jie jux dde xiep) is in the Liangshan Yi Autonomous Prefecture in the southwest of Sichuan province, China, bordering Yunnan province to the southwest. It is a remote, mountainous and forested region with few roads. The highest peaks are nearly 6000 metres in height. The trio of the sacred Konkaling mountains - Shenrezig, Jambeyang and Chanadorje in Yading Natural Park - lie to the west in Daocheng County, barely accessible by rough jeep track from Chabulang in northern Muli County.

== History ==
Muli has been inhabited by people speaking Tibeto-Burman languages, of which the largest group are Premi. It has been ruled by Tibetans, the Nanzhao Kingdom, the Dali Kingdom, and the Mongol Empire. In the Ming dynasty, it was in the directly-administered Yanyuan County. In the 1400s, part of Muli became controlled by the Chiefdom of Lijiang, under which several Karma Kagyupa monasteries were built.

=== Semi-independent state ===
In 1584, a Gelug monastery was established in Muli following a request from nobles to Sonam Gyatso, the third Dalai Lama. Its first abbot and tulku, Sangye Gyatso, died in the same year and Jamyang Sangpo, the heir of the Bar tusi, was recognized as his reincarnation. In 1604, Mu Zeng, the tusi of Lijiang, led a military occupation of Muli to promote Karma Kagyupa against Gelugpa. In 1648, after Lijiang was captured by Qing supporters, Jamyang Sangpo retook Muli and gained support to have the position of head lama be inherited within the Bar clan.

Muli was a semi-independent monastic domain under the Ganden Phodrang and Qing dynasty. Although regularly called on to provide soldiers, it had high autonomy due to its peripheral location and politicking. Political and religious authority was jointly held by the head lama, tulku, and lord of Bar and the seat of government rotated between the Muli, Wachin, and Kulu monasteries.

Muli performed well in the recapture of Gyeldang during the Rebellion of Wu Sangui and was awarded five villages in Eya by the Dalai Lama. The Qing emperor was suspicious of the Dalai Lama's response to the rebellion and other events, and increased control in the southwest. The Qing dynasty awarded the head lama with the mid-level title of pacification commander (安抚使) in 1729, the Chinese family name of Xiang (项) in 1781, and the high-level title of control commissioner (宣慰使) in 1868. In 1867, a high-ranking monk had a dispute with the head lama and attacked with the aid of a Han opium dealer and his troops. Despite the head lama's death and other losses, the Bar clan remained in power.

In the Warlord Era, Muli remained relatively stable and its population doubled from refugees in the 1940s. It aided some warlords and fought Zuosuo, another tusi in Yanyuan County.

The explorer Joseph Rock visited Muli in the 1920s and 1930s and befriended the head lama Chote Chaba. His colorful accounts were published in the National Geographic and may have inspired the novel Lost Horizon.

=== People's Republic of China ===
In 1950, Muli cooperated with the PLA as they cornered Nationalist forces in southwest China. Muli Tibetan Autonomous County was established in 1953. As Muli was reorganized and incorporated into the PRC, former political elites were given positions in the new administration and CPPCC. Muli was actively engaged in the Democratic Reforms campaign to redistribute land, end corvée labor, and end slave-holding. It opposed the 1959 Tibetan uprising. In 1959, the monasteries were closed, and many were destroyed or became dilapidated. Muli was heavily affected by the Great Leap Forward and Cultural Revolution.

== Religion ==
The three main monasteries are Wachin Gompa (瓦尔寨), constructed in 1584, Kulu Gompa (康坞), constructed in 1604, and Muli Gompa. Muli Gompa was constructed starting in 1656 and modeled after Drepung Monastery. It once housed a 27.5-meter-high bronze statue of Maitreya created in 1711. At its height in the mid-1800s it had over a thousand monks, and declined to possibly 600 by the Communist takeover. It was largely destroyed in the Cultural Revolution and rebuilt to a much smaller size in 1982. In 1999, Muli recorded 41 monks at Muli Gompa out of a total of 253.

Some villages practice Premi traditional religion, which has incorporated elements of Gelugpa Buddhism.

== Geography ==
Muli county has an area of 13,252 km^{2} (5,117 sq mi).

The county is characterised by the canyons formed by three rivers flowing from north to south: the Shuiluo River, the Litang River, and the Yalong River that carves out a huge canyon before flowing into the Yangtze River.

== Climate ==
Climate data for Muli, elevation 2,427 m (7,963 ft), (1991–2020 normals, extremes 1991–present)
Month	Jan	Feb	Mar	Apr	May	Jun	Jul	Aug	Sep	Oct	Nov	Dec	Year
Record high °C (°F)	23.7 (74.7)	26.4 (79.5)	29.5 (85.1)	31.2 (88.2)	33.6 (92.5)	35.1 (95.2)	32.0 (89.6)	31.3 (88.3)	32.0 (89.6)	28.4 (83.1)	25.9 (78.6)	22.7 (72.9)	35.1 (95.2)
Mean daily maximum °C (°F)	15.3 (59.5)	17.4 (63.3)	20.2 (68.4)	23.3 (73.9)	25.4 (77.7)	25.9 (78.6)	24.8 (76.6)	24.5 (76.1)	23.2 (73.8)	21.3 (70.3)	18.1 (64.6)	15.5 (59.9)	21.2 (70.2)
Daily mean °C (°F)	7.6 (45.7)	9.9 (49.8)	12.7 (54.9)	15.6 (60.1)	18.2 (64.8)	19.4 (66.9)	18.9 (66.0)	18.6 (65.5)	17.2 (63.0)	14.6 (58.3)	10.4 (50.7)	7.6 (45.7)	14.2 (57.6)
Mean daily minimum °C (°F)	1.0 (33.8)	3.1 (37.6)	6.2 (43.2)	9.2 (48.6)	12.4 (54.3)	14.8 (58.6)	15.1 (59.2)	14.7 (58.5)	13.3 (55.9)	9.7 (49.5)	4.5 (40.1)	1.2 (34.2)	8.8 (47.8)
Record low °C (°F)	−5.4 (22.3)	−4.4 (24.1)	−0.9 (30.4)	2.4 (36.3)	4.0 (39.2)	8.3 (46.9)	9.3 (48.7)	9.1 (48.4)	5.4 (41.7)	3.1 (37.6)	−1.7 (28.9)	−6.5 (20.3)	−6.5 (20.3)
Average precipitation mm (inches)	3.9 (0.15)	2.6 (0.10)	8.9 (0.35)	21.6 (0.85)	68.2 (2.69)	161.6 (6.36)	201.5 (7.93)	168.1 (6.62)	112.0 (4.41)	39.0 (1.54)	9.7 (0.38)	1.3 (0.05)	798.4 (31.43)
Average precipitation days (≥ 0.1 mm)	2.0	2.1	4.3	6.9	12.9	19.6	22.0	20.8	17.5	9.8	2.8	0.7	121.4
Average snowy days	1.2	0.8	0.4	0.1	0	0	0	0	0	0	0.1	0.4	3
Average relative humidity (%)	36	33	35	40	51	67	76	75	74	65	54	44	54
Mean monthly sunshine hours	227.3	207.9	228.6	214.3	203.6	154.8	130.2	142.4	132.6	184.3	206.2	224.8	2,257
Percentage possible sunshine	69	65	61	55	48	37	31	35	36	52	64	70	52
Source: China Meteorological Administrationall-time November record high

== Administrative divisions ==
Muli County comprises 6 towns, 16 townships and 5 ethnic townships.

Name	Simplified Chinese	Hanyu Pinyin	Tibetan	Wylie	Administrative division code
Towns
Qab'oi Town (Qiaowa)	乔瓦镇	Qiáowǎ Zhèn	ཆབ་འོད་གྲོང་རྡལ།	chab 'od grong rdal	513422100
Tangkur Town (Wachang)	瓦厂镇	Wǎchǎng Zhèn	ཐང་ཁུར་གྲོང་རྡལ།	thang khur grong rdal	513422101
Carong Town (Chabulang)	茶布朗镇	Chábùlǎng Zhèn	ཚ་རོང་གྲོང་རྡལ།	tsha rong grong rdal	513422102
Yalongjiang Town	雅砻江镇	Yǎlóngjiāng Zhèn			513422103
Xolung Town (Shuiluo, Xolo)	水洛镇	Shuǐluò Zhèn	ཞོ་ལུང་གྲོང་རྡལ།	zho lung grong rdal	513422104
Lêgwa Town (Liewa, Liwa)	列瓦镇	Lièwǎ Zhèn	ལེགས་བ་གྲོང་རྡལ།	legs ba grong rdal	513422105
Townships
Bakü Township (Boikü, Boke)	博科乡	Bókē Xiāng	དཔའ་ཁུལ་གྲོང་།	dpa' khul grong	513422201
Lingrong Township (Ninglang)	宁朗乡	Nínglǎng Xiāng	གླིང་རོང་ཞང་།	gling rong zhang	513422202
Yargyai Township (Yiji)	依吉乡	Yījí Xiāng	ཡར་རྒྱས་ཞང་།	yar rgyas zhang	513422203
Zhiyagtang Township (Maoniuping)	牦牛坪乡	Máoniúpíng Xiāng	འབྲི་གཡག་ཐང་ཞང་།	'bri g.yag thang zhang	513422206
Zhaixingtang Township (Liziping)	李子坪乡	Lǐzǐpíng Xiāng	འབྲས་ཤིང་ཐང་ཤང་།	'bras shing thang shang	513422209
Xiqu Township (Xiqiu)	西秋乡	Xīqiū Xiāng	ཤིས་ཆུ་ཞང་།	shis chu zhang	513422213
Karri Township (Ke'er)	克尔乡	Kè'ěr Xiāng	མཁར་རི་ཞང་།	mkhar ri zhang	513422214
Sagaryü Township (Sanjueya)	三桷桠乡	Sānjuéyā Xiāng	ས་དཀར་ཡུལ་ཞང་།	sa dkar yul zhang	513422216
Norbu Township (Luobo)	倮波乡	Luǒbō Xiāng	ནོར་བུ་ཞང་།	nor bu zhang	513422217
Karra Township (Kala)	卡拉乡	Kǎlā Xiāng	མཁར་ར་ཞང་།	mkhar ra zhang	513422218
Horsog Township (Housuo)	后所乡	Hòusuǒ Xiāng	ཧོར་སོག་ཞང་།	hor sog zhang	513422219
Xê'oi Township (Shawan)	沙湾乡	Shāwān Xiāng	ཤེལ་འོད་ཞང་།	shel 'od zhang	513422220
Baisi Township (Mairi)	麦日乡	Màirì Xiāng	དཔལ་གཟི་ཞང་།	dpal gzi zhang	513422223
Dêrrong Township (Donglang)	东朗乡	Dōnglǎng Xiāng	གཏེར་རོང་ཞང་།	gter rong zhang	513422224
Tangyang Township	唐央乡	Tángyāng Xiāng	ཐང་ཡངས་ཞང་།	thang yangs zhang	513422225
Bawo Township	博窝乡	Bówō Xiāng	དཔའ་བོ་ཞང་།	dpa' bo zhang	513422226
Ethnic townships
Oyag Naxi Ethnic Township (Eya)	俄亚纳西族乡	Éyà Nàxīzú Xiāng	འོ་ཡག་འཇང་རིགས་ཞང་།	'o yag 'jang rigs zhang	513422204
Ujuur Mongol Ethnic Township (Rinjung, Wujiao)	屋脚蒙古族乡	Wūjiǎo Ménggǔzú Xiāng	རིན་འབྱུང་སོག་རིགས་ཞང་།	rin 'byung sog rigs zhang	513422207
Ngagjoi Mongol Ethnic Township (Xiangjiao)	项脚蒙古族乡	Xiàngjiǎo Ménggǔzú Xiāng	སྔགས་སྤྱོད་སོག་རིགས་ཞང་།	sngags spyod sog rigs zhang	513422208
Baidain Miao Ethnic Township (Baidiao)	白碉苗族乡	Báidiāo Miáozú Xiāng	དཔལ་ལྡན་མིའོ་རིགས་ཞང་།	dpal ldan mi'o rigs zhang	513422215
Kêzain Miao Ethnic Township (Guzeng)	固增苗族乡	Gùzēng Miáozú Xiāng	གེ་བཙན་མྱའོ་རིགས་ཞང་།	ge btsan mya'o rigs zhang	513422222

== Demographics ==
Muli County has a population of more than 125,000. The inhabitants of Muli include many of China's minorities, predominantly Tibetan and Yi as well as Pumi and Naxi people. There are also some ethnic Mongol people who settled here after the pacification expeditions of Kublai Khan in the 11th century.

=== Ethnic groups in Muli, 2000 census ===
Nationality	Population	Percentage
Tibetan	40,312	32.39%
Yi	34,489	27.71%
Han	27,199	21.85%
Miao	8,371	6.73%
Mongol	8,035	6.46%
Naxi	4,317	3.47%
Buyei	988	0.79%
Zhuang	403	0.32%
Lisu	124	0.1%
Hui	91	0.07%
Bai	91	0.07%
Manchu	15	0.01%
Others	27	0.02%

== Economy ==
The main resources in Muli are hydro electric power from the rivers and a wide variety of plants used in traditional Chinese medicine, such as Chinese caterpillar fungus. The remote location and low population have allowed many protected species to survive here, including the white-lipped deer and stump-tailed macaque.

Muli is famous for its gold producing rivers, which are still exploited on a small, non-industrial scale. Its broad expanses of forests were also heavily logged until a logging ban was introduced in 1999. Now most of the local economy is based on agriculture and livestock. Forests include hemlock, cypress, yellow cedars, as well as spruce and fir trees.

Muli is also known for its azalea, rhododendron, and walnut plants.
