= Chote Chaba =

Tibetan lama and ruler of Muli from 1924 to 1934

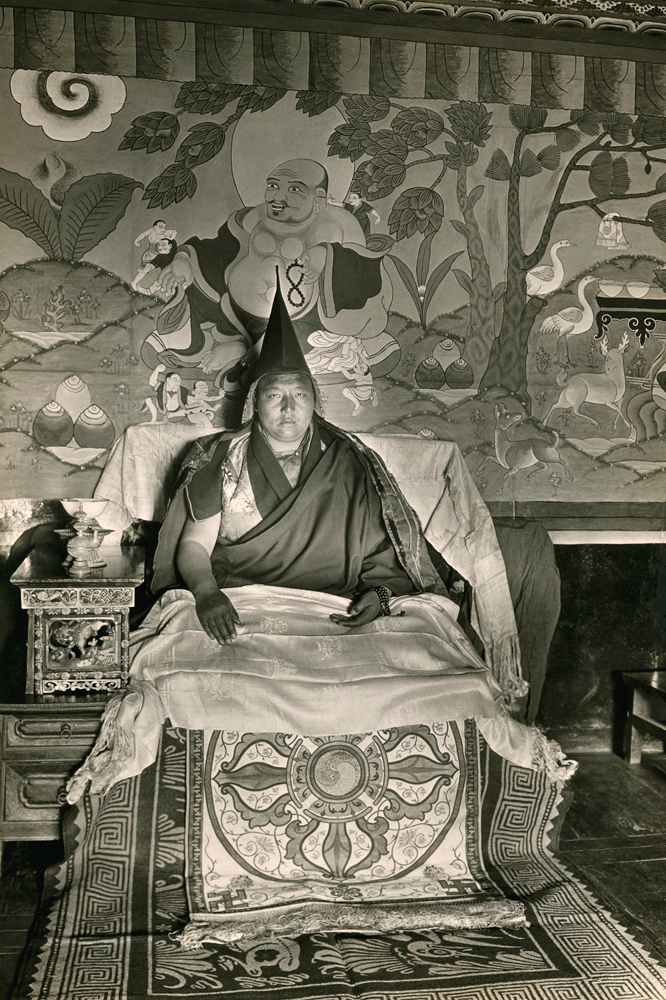
- Chote Chaba in 1924

Head lama of Muli
- Reign: 1924–1934
- Predecessor: Xiang Longpu
- Successor: Xiang Zhaba Songdian
- Born: 1877
- Died: 1934 (aged 56–57)

Chote Chaba (1877–1934) (also written Tsultrim Dakpa; Tibetan: ཚུལ་ཁྲིམས་དྭགས་པ, Wylie: tshul khrims dwags pa; Chinese: 项此称扎巴; pinyin: Xiàng Cǐchēng Zhábā) was the 16th head lama who ruled Muli, which at the time was a small princely state under both the Tibetan Ganden Phodrang and Republic of China, and now forms the Muli Tibetan Autonomous County in southwestern Sichuan province. He was recognized as the 12th incarnation of the Migyur Khutughtu. During his reign he expanded the military and allied with Long Yun and Chiang Kai-shek during regional conflict following the Warlord Era. He was killed on the orders of Liu Wenhui.

== Biography ==
=== Early life ===
Xiang Cicheng Zhaba was born in 1877 into the Bar clan, which ruled Muli. He was recognized as the reincarnation of Miji Tulku of Molashog Gompa. He received a comprehensive Buddhist education and made several pilgrimages to Tibet, then gained prominence as he traveled across Kham to teach Buddhism.

=== Reign ===
In 1924, his older brother, the 15th head lama died, leaving a young son and heir. Xiang Cicheng Zhaba returned to Muli and secured support to become the acting 16th head lama. As was customary, he sent the 13th Dalai Lama and 8th Pancha Lama gifts and had his succession recognized.

Xiang was also one of nine tusi in Yanyuan, a semi-autonomous position in the Chinese government, but acted with the independence of a king. He developed the military and fostered strong ties with prominent figures in Xikang, Tibet, and Yunnan. He aided Chen Xialing, a Sichuan frontier commissioner and warlord, in suppressing a rebellion in Lihuo. In 1928, troops were sent to abolish the tusi system in Muli.

In 1930, Xiang helped the warlord Long Yun attack the remnants of a Nationalist army in Yunnan led by Hu Ruoyu, nearly annihilating them before they found refuge with the warlord Liu Wenhui. Liu Wenhui was an enemy of Long Yun and part of a faction of the Nationalist Party opposing Chiang Kai-shek.

In March 1931, Xiang sent a delegation with gifts to Chiang Kai-shek. While Chiang did not give them an audience, he granted the title "Nomihan" (Dharma King) to Xiang and later sent rifles and bullets to Muli.

In 1933, an army led by Liu Wenhui sent a group to mine for gold in Muli to pay its soldiers. Xiang asked the Republican government to stop the mining, promising compensation that he did not pay. Simultaneously, he supported bandits who harassed the group. They killed the soldiers accompanying the miners, stopping the mining.

In 1934, on the recommendation of Long Yun, Xiang received the title "Lieutenant General of the Ground Forces" from the Nationalist government.

=== Death ===
In November 1934, Liu Wenhui retaliated against Xiang for the earlier incidents. He sent a commander and soldiers purportedly to present Xiang with the position of control commissioner. Xiang came to meet them near Kulu Gompa and was shot dead.

After his death, Liu also had the tulku of Muli as well as Xiang's nephew and successor captured and ransomed. After being released and succeeding as the 17th head lama, Xiang Zhaba Songdian reconciled with Liu and also strengthened the relationship with Long Yun.

== Records ==
In 1924, Joseph Rock, an Austrian-American botanist and explorer, visited Muli and was hosted lavishly by Xiang, whose name he wrote as Chote Chaba. He wrote that Xiang was 6 ft 2 in (1.88 m) tall and attended to in extreme deference. In conversation, Rock found him to be good-humored and curious, and wrote "l doubt whether until that time (the King of Muli) had known of the discovery of America. He did not have the slightest idea of the existence of an ocean and thought all land contiguous, for he asked if he could ride horseback from Muli to Washington and if the latter was near Germany."

== Title and reincarnation ==
The title of khutughtu, which is the Mongolian term for a reincarnate lama (tulku) was granted to Chote Chamba's predecessor, the 10th Migyur, by the Qianlong Emperor of Qing China in 1751. The 10th Migyur also received the title of Nomun Khan.

Chote Chamba's reincarnation, the 13th Migyur Khutughtu, was born in Lithang in the year on July 4, 1935. He was recognized by Ngawang Legpa Rinpoche at the age of one, and was given the name Ngawang Tenzin Migyur. After the Chinese occupation of Tibet, the 13th Mingyur Rinpoche relocated to Taiwan at the invitation of the Kuomintang Intelligence Bureau, along with a members group led by Jama Samphe (嘉瑪桑佩). He was as a member of the Mongolian and Tibetan Affairs Commission and taught at the National Cheng Chi University in Taiwan.
