= Donglang Township, Sichuan =

Donglang Township 东朗乡
- Township
- Donglangxiang
- Location in Sichuan
- Coordinates: 28°50′55″N 100°40′31″E
- Country: People's Republic of China
- Province: Sichuan
- Autonomous prefecture: Liangshan Yi Autonomous Prefecture
- County: Muli Tibetan Autonomous County

Area
  - Total: 627.2 km^{2} (242.2 sq mi)

Population (2010)
  - Total: 2,591
  - Density: 4.131/km^{2} (10.70/sq mi)
- Time zone: UTC+8 (China Standard)

Donglang (Chinese: 东朗乡) is a township in Muli Tibetan Autonomous County, Liangshan Yi Autonomous Prefecture, Sichuan, China. In 2010, Donglang Township had a total population of 2,591: 1,279 males and 1,312 females: 653 aged under 14, 1,750 aged between 15 and 65 and 188 aged over 65.

== See also ==
- List of township-level divisions of Sichuan
