= Mo (Chinese surname) =

Mo (莫)
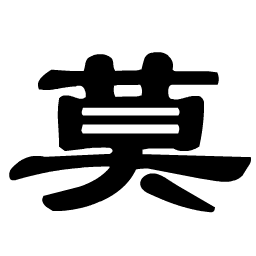
- Pronunciation: Mò (Mandarin); Mok^{6} (Cantonese)

Origin
- Meaning: Evening; do not
- Region of origin: China

Mo (莫) is the pinyin romanization of the surname pronounced in Standard Chinese as "Mò" and in Cantonese as "Mok^{6}". The surname is often romanized as Mok where Cantonese speakers are prominent. According to a study of Mu Ying's Name record, the surname came to be when descendants of the antediluvian ruler Zhuanxu abbreviated the name of his city, Moyangcheng (莫陽城) and took it as their surname.

As Chinese family names go, Mo is relatively rare, ranked 168th in the Hundred Family Surnames. In 2004, there were an estimated 73,000 people with the surname of Mo abroad and 1,540,000 Mos in China.

When not used as a surname, 'Mo' (莫) means ''do not''.

Related surname with Ma & Mu.

Western like as similar surname: Moore, Morris, Morgan, Moss, Monroe

== Notable people ==
=== Arts and culture ===
- Evelyn Mok, Chinese-Swedish-English comedian
- Ping Mo (莫平), Chinese architect
- Max Mok Siu-Chung (莫少聰), Hong Kong actor
- Hoyan Mok (莫可欣), winner of Miss Hong Kong Pageant (1993)
- Karen Mok (莫文蔚), Hong Kong singer and actress
- Warren Mok (莫華倫), Hong Kong tenor
- Mo Han (莫寒), Chinese singer, member of SNH48

=== Business ===
- Charles Mok (莫乃光), Hong Kong internet entrepreneur

=== Production ===
- Ken Mok, American television producer
- May Mok (莫美華), Hong Kong sound editor
- Tze Ming Mok (莫志明), New Zealand writer

=== Politics ===
- Mo Xuanqing (莫宣卿), the youngest "number one scholar" (in the imperial examination) in Chinese history

=== Sports ===
- Mok Hing (莫慶), Hong Kong and Chinese football player, manager, administrator and primary founder of the South China Athletic Association
- Mo Huilan (莫慧兰), Chinese gymnast, silver medalist at the 1996 Olympic Games

== See also ==
- Mạc (surname)
- Chinese surname
- List of common Chinese surnames
