= Ron Mock =

Ron Mock is Professor of Politics and Peace Studies at George Fox University. He is also a Quaker author in the area of peace studies and conflict resolution. Mock was previously a practicing attorney, an instructor at University of Detroit Law School and a founding director of the Christian Conciliation Service of Southeastern Michigan.

== Vocational history ==
Mock received his undergraduate education at George Fox, where he would return in 1985 as a professor. His degree was a BA in History and Political Science. He then went on to an MPA from Drake University, and earned his JD from the University of Michigan. After three years of practicing law, he joined George Fox University as assistant director of its Center for Peace and Justice (then called the Center for Peace Learning). Since that time, he has remained in various positions at the University, including Associate Professor, Capstone Director, and University Scholars Program Director. His teaching includes peacemaking courses such as Conflict Resolution, law courses such as Constitutional Law and National Power, and other courses in politics. He also helped create George Fox University's Senior Capstone general education course.

== Peacemaking work ==
The majority of Mock’s scholarship has been in the area of peacemaking, in particular Christian peacemaking. Besides his work at George Fox’s Center for Peace and Justice, and his work in direct community mediation, his most notable work in this area was the 2004 Loving Without Giving In, which attempts to provide a thoroughgoing Christian response to the horrors of 9/11. Specifically, the work seeks to explain first why terrorism, tyranny, and corruption are such political evils, and second why traditional military methods are not ideal for combating such problems. In his foreword to the book, Oregon Senator Mark Hatfield wrote that Mock "draws on sources typically ignored by policymakers to suggest new responses that offer genuine hope for a long-term winning strategy against terror and tyranny." His other notable academic work on peacemaking includes authoring "The Biblical Basis of Peacemaking" published in Quaker Theology, and co-authoring When the Rain Returns: Toward Justice and Reconciliation in Palestine and Israel, published by the American Friends Service committee.

Mock has also conducted numerous trips abroad in pursuit of peacemaking research, including to Nicaragua, Costa Rica, Netherlands, Jordan, Egypt, Israel, Palestine, and South Korea, and has completed (but not yet published) a work on the moral complexities of pacifism entitled Pacifist Under Pressure.
