= Henry P. Mock =

American politician

Member of the New Hampshire House of Representatives from the Carroll 3rd district
- In office 1992–2002

Member of the New Hampshire House of Representatives from the Carroll 4th district
- In office 2002–2004

Personal details
- Born: 1936 or 1937 (age 89–90)
- Party: Republican

Henry P. Mock (born 1936/1937) is an American politician. A member of the Republican Party, he served in the New Hampshire House of Representatives from 1992 to 2004.
