= Chiefdom of Lijiang =

Nakhi Tusi chiefdom (abolished 1723)

Chiefdom of Lijiang 麗江土司
- ?–1723
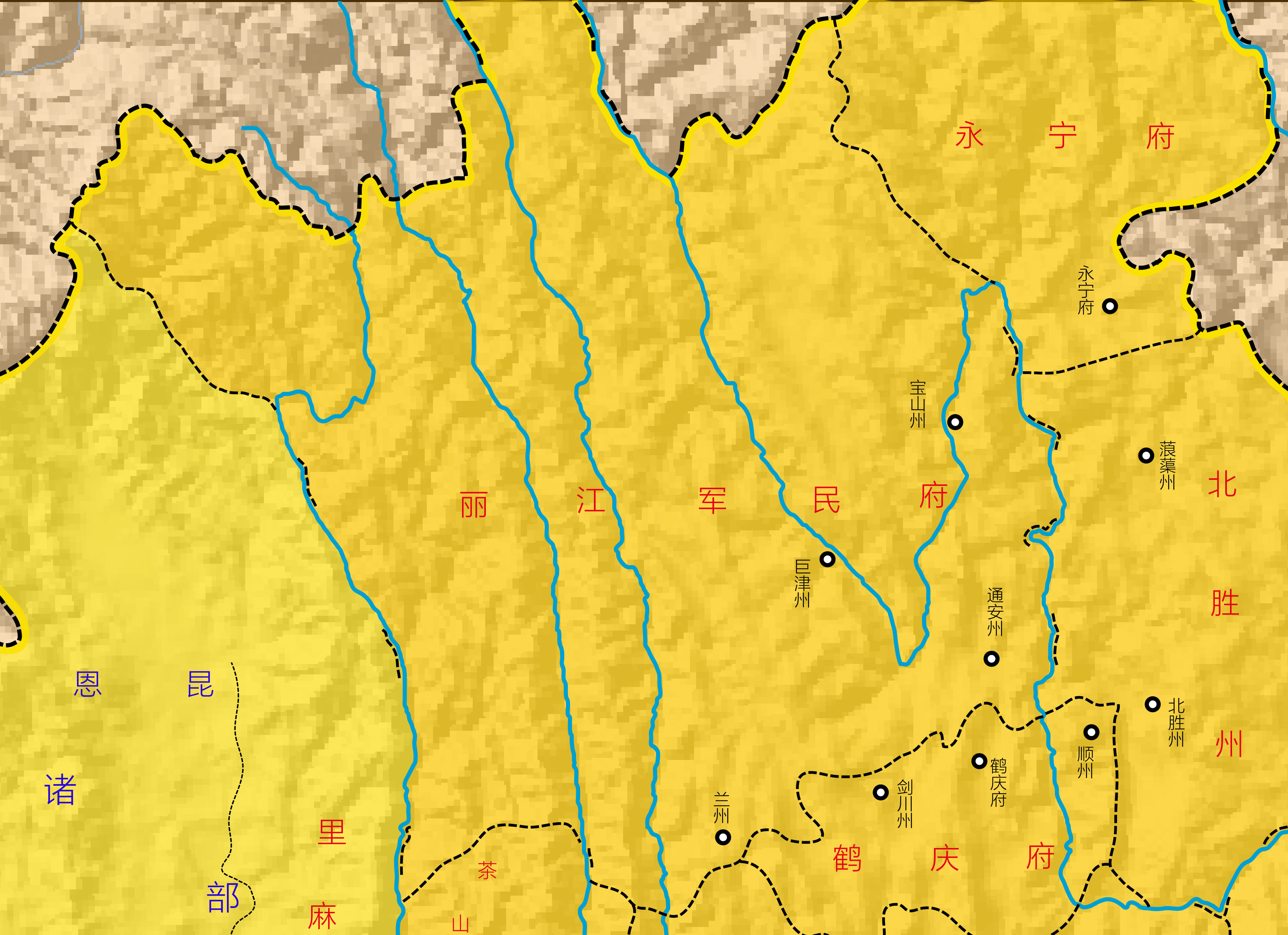
- Status: Native Chiefdom of China
- Capital: Lijiang
- Common languages: Naxi language
- Government: Monarchy
- Jang Sadam Gyalpo
  - ?–?: A-ts'ung A-liang (first)
  - ?–1390: Mu De
  - 1597–1623: Mu Zeng
  - 1722–1723: Mu Zhong (last)
- History
  - Established: ?
  - Disestablished: 1723
Preceded by	Succeeded by
Dali Kingdom	Qing dynasty
- Today part of: China

The Chiefdom of Lijiang (simplified Chinese: 丽江土司; traditional Chinese: 麗江土司; pinyin: Lìjiāng tǔsī; Naxi: Yiggv Tufsil) was a Nakhi autonomous Tusi chiefdom that ruled Lijiang during Yuan, Ming and Qing dynasty.

== History ==
At first, Lijiang was ruled by Yuexi Zhao (越巂詔). Later, it was annexed by Nanzhao. According to legend, ancestor Lijiang chieftains was a Mongol.

Mongolians invaded the Dali in 1253. Moubao Acong (牟保阿琮), the chieftain of Lijiang, surrendered to the Mongol Empire. His son was granted the title Lijiang Lu Xuanweishi (麗江路宣慰使) by Yuan dynasty.

After the Ming dynasty came into power, the chieftain Ajia Ade swore allegiance to the Ming dynasty. Hongwu Emperor gave him the Chinese name "Mu De" (木得). From then on, chieftains of Lijiang also had Chinese name; they started to use Chinese surname Mu (木). They received the official position "Magistrate of Lijiang" (麗江知府) from Chinese emperor.

Chieftains of Lijiang helped Ming China in Ming conquest of Yunnan and Luchuan–Pingmian campaigns. They also seized many territories from neighbouring chiefdoms.

Lijiang saw its golden age during Mu Zeng's reign; It became the most powerful in present-day southwestern China. Lijiang attacked Gyalrong people frequently, and invaded Kingdom of Chakla. King of Chakla had to appeal for China's help. However, Mu Zeng promised to Chinese that he would offer soldiers in Ming–Manchu War. It was a successful diplomatic effort, Ming China did nothing but send an envoy to Lijiang to call for a cease-fire.

After Manchu conquest of China, chieftain Mu Yi (木懿) swore allegiance to Manchu Qing dynasty. In 1673, Wu Sangui revolted against Qing dynasty. Mu Yi rejected to swear allegiance to Wu Sangui, and was thrown into prison. Mu Yi was released after the rebellion was put down, and restored.

The Chiefdom of Lijiang was abolished by Yongzheng Emperor in 1723. Since then, the magistrates of Lijiang were all Han Chinese; they were appointed by Chinese emperor directly. The leader of Mu family was granted the title Tǔ Tōngpàn (土通判) from Chinese court, but had no real power.

== Culture ==
Lijiang culture was deeply influenced by both Chinese and Tibetan culture. Nakhi people accepted Confucianism. Many chieftains were well-educated. Mu Tai (木泰), Mu Gong (木公), Mu Gao (木高), Mu Qing (木青), Mu Zeng (木增) and Mu Jing (木靖) were good at writing Chinese poetry.

In 1639, Xu Xiake, a Chinese travel writer, came to Lijiang. Xu was warmly welcomed by Mu Zeng.

Many Nakhi people also accepted the Tibetan Buddhism. Chieftain Mu Zeng provided shelter for Chöying Dorje, 10th Karmapa.

Old Town of Lijiang was registered on the UNESCO World Heritage List on December 4, 1997.

== List of Lijiang chieftains ==
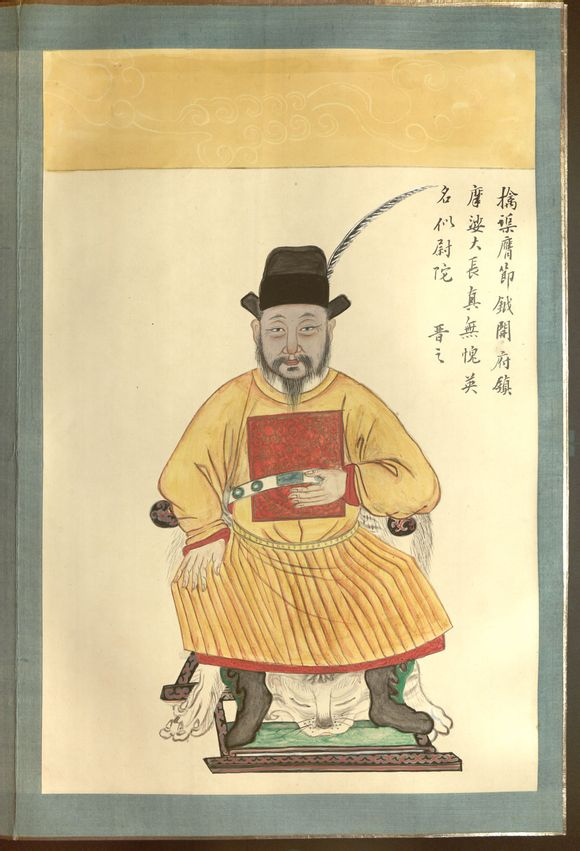
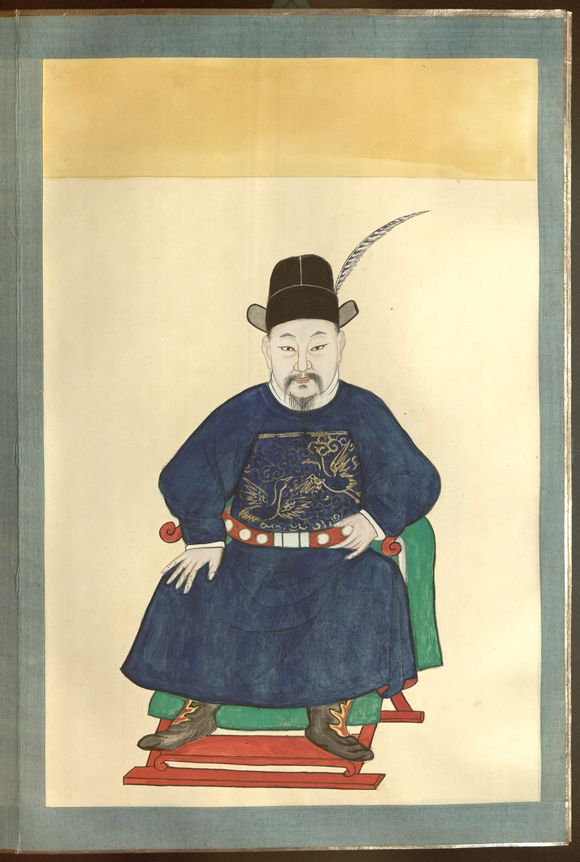
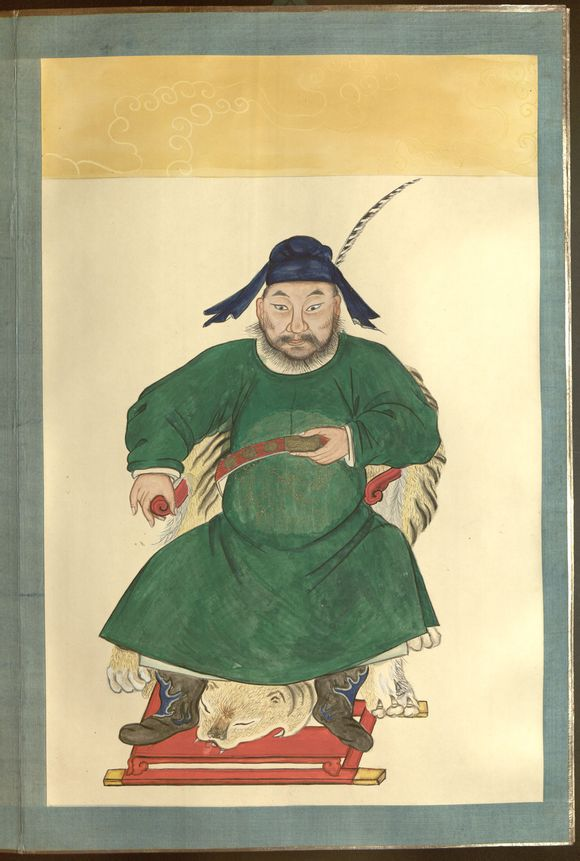
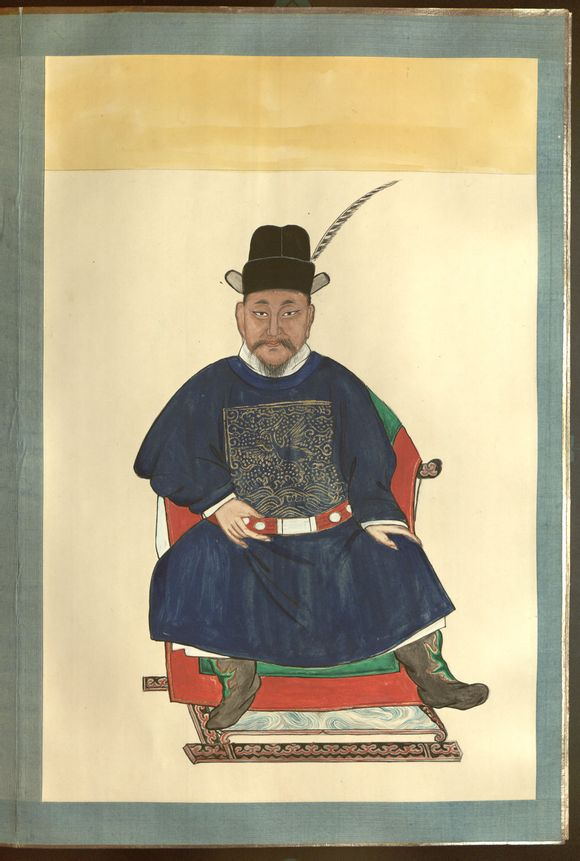
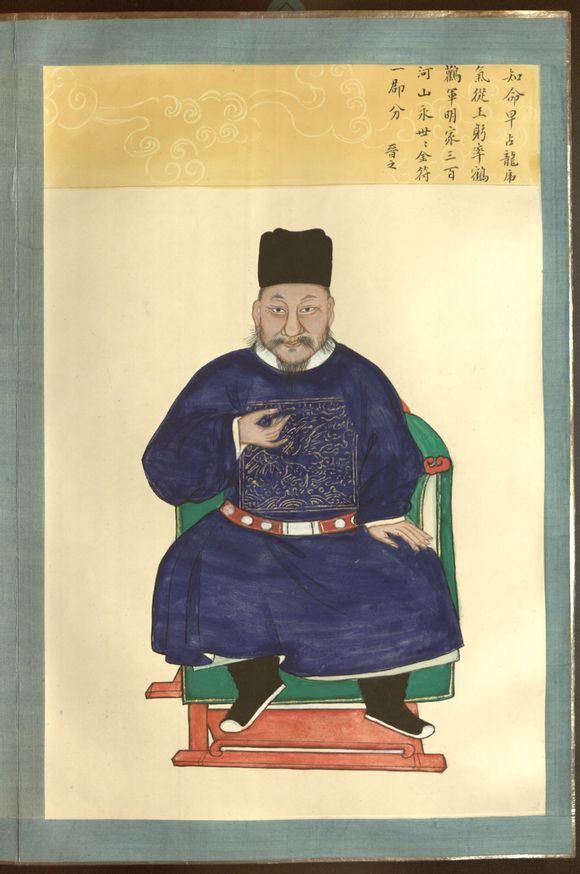
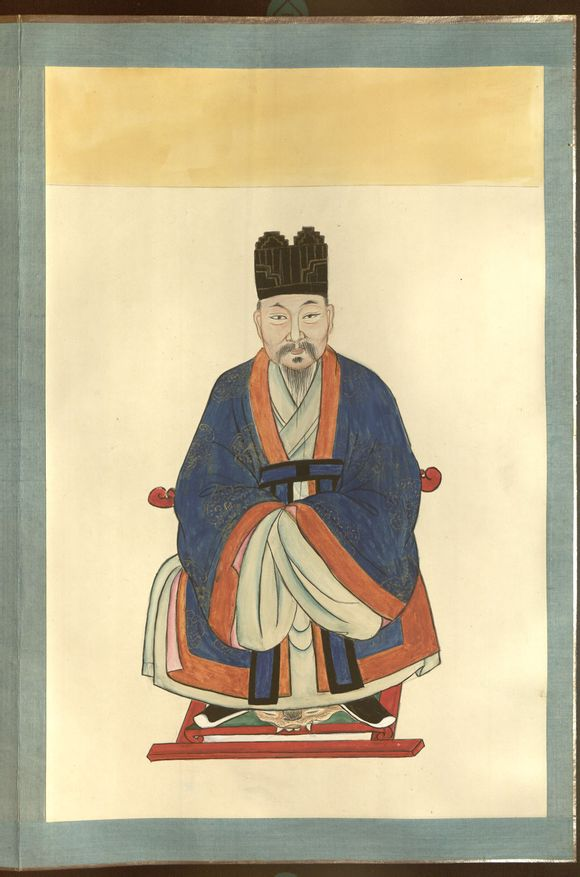
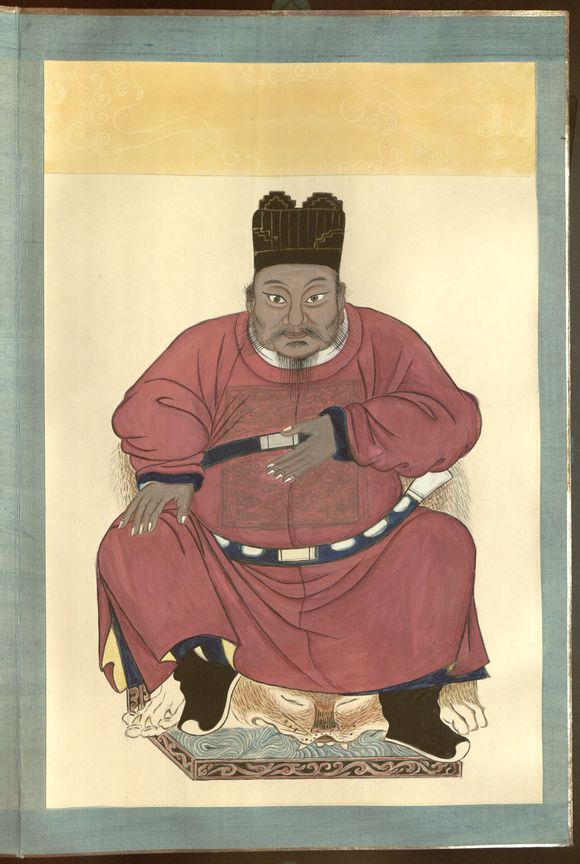
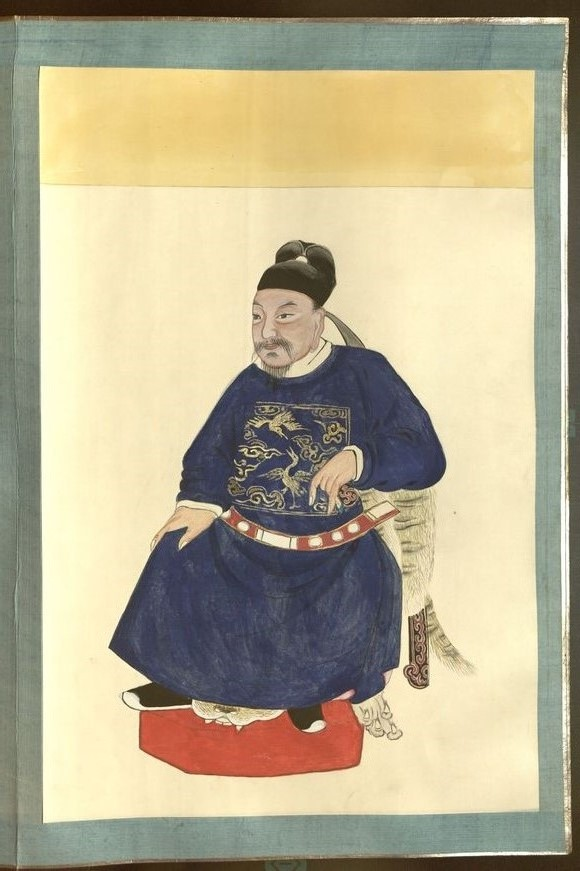
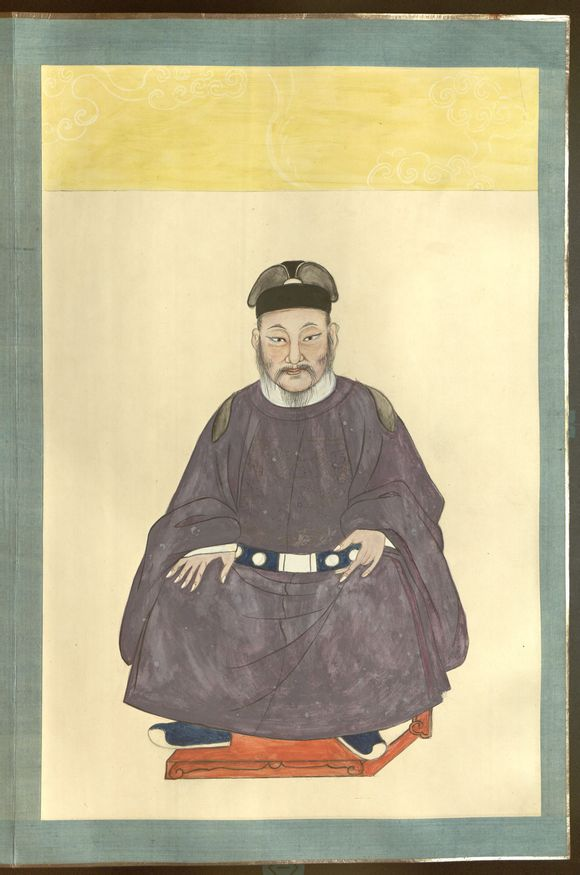
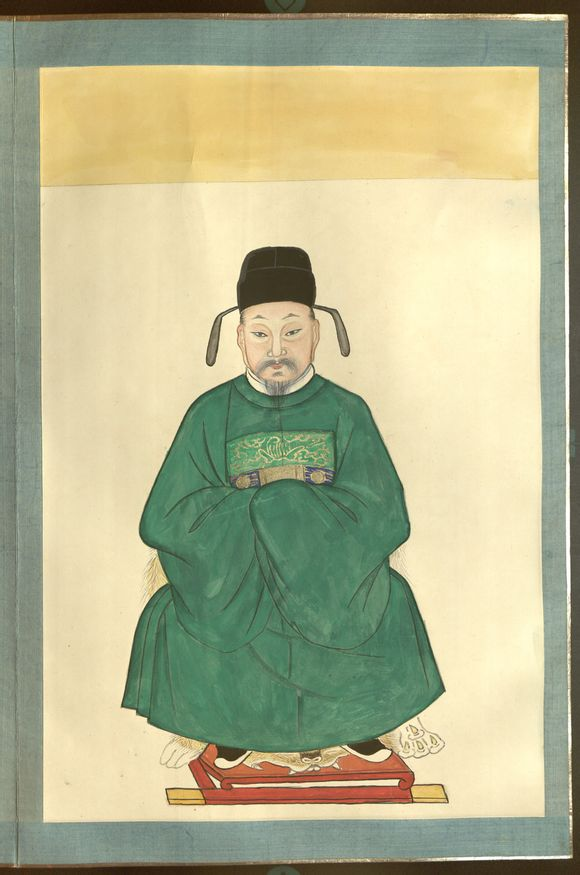
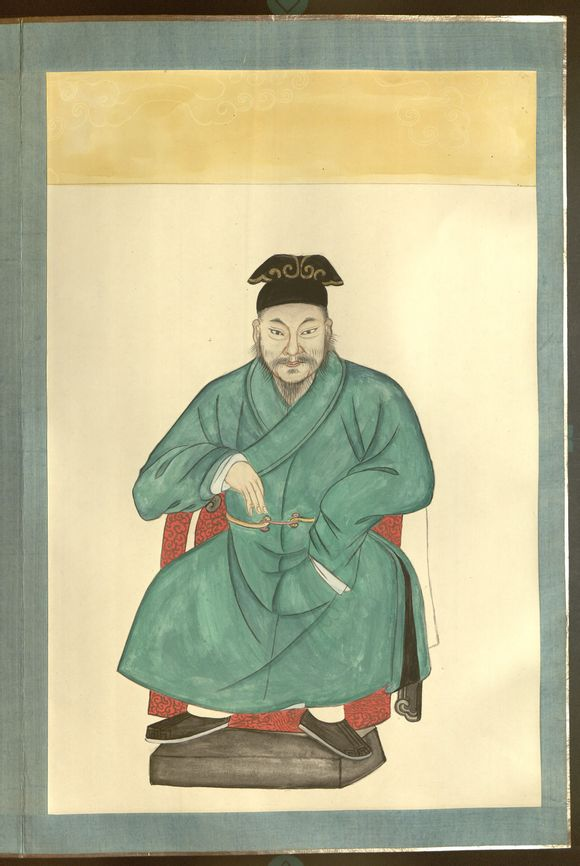
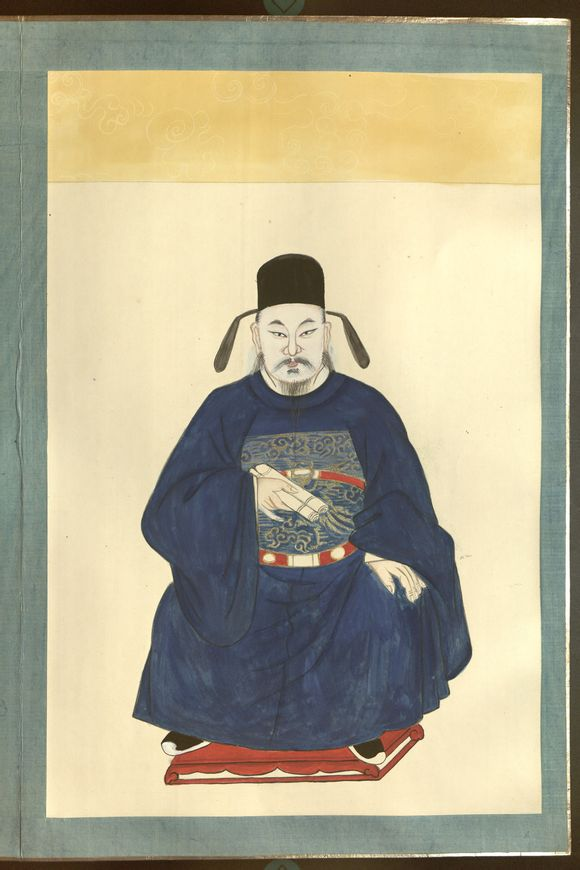
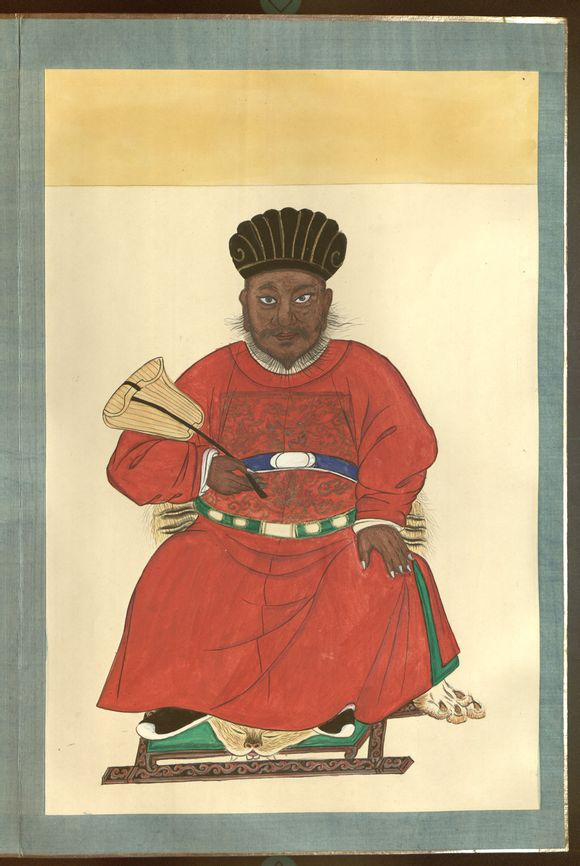
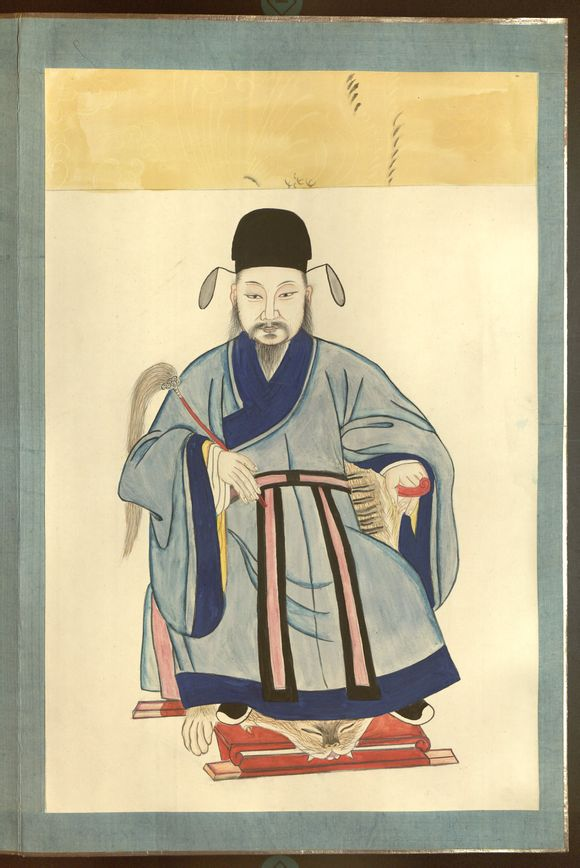
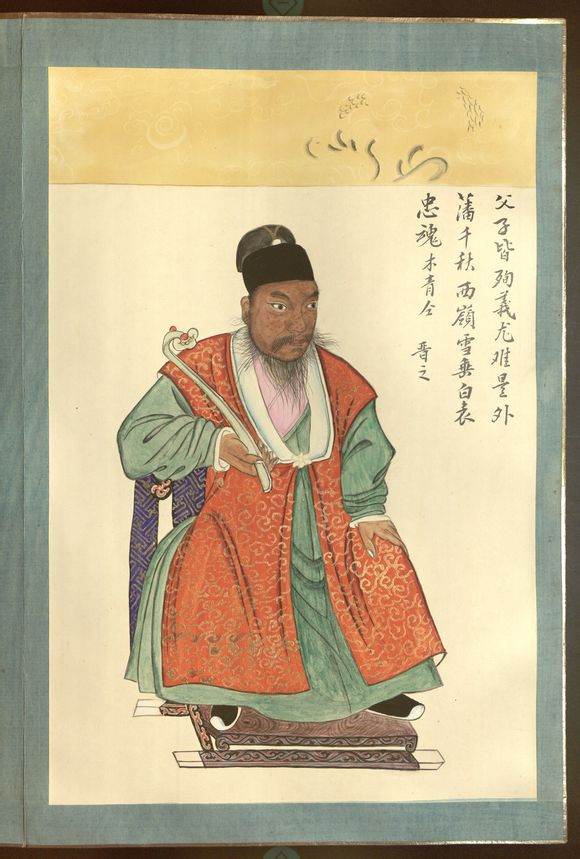
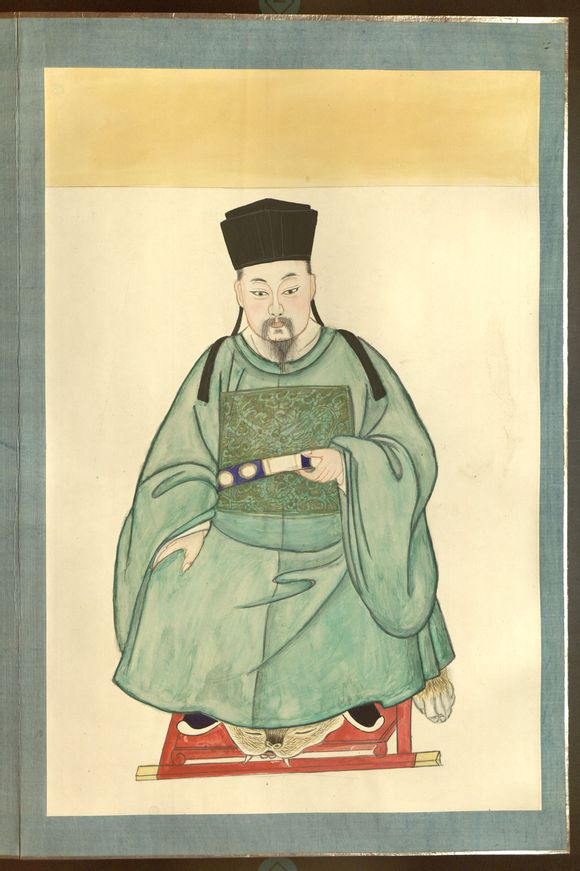
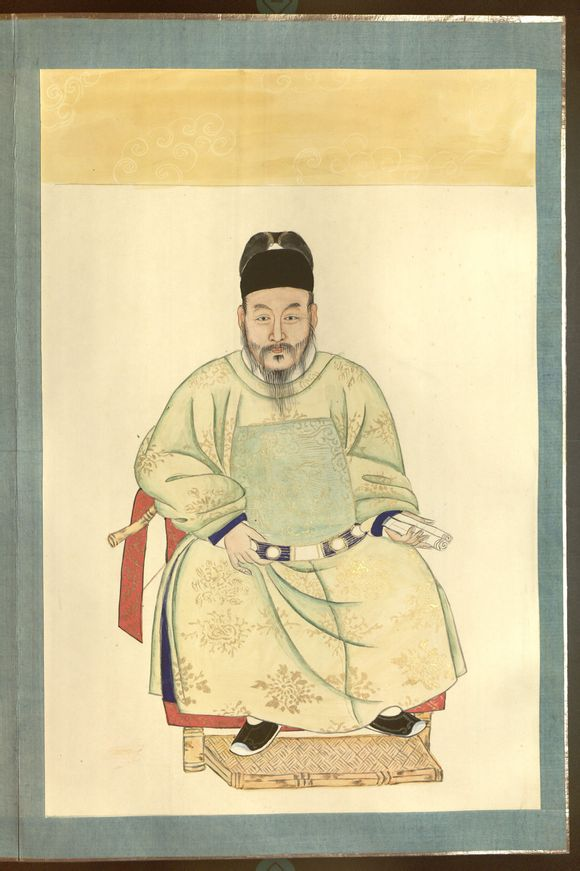
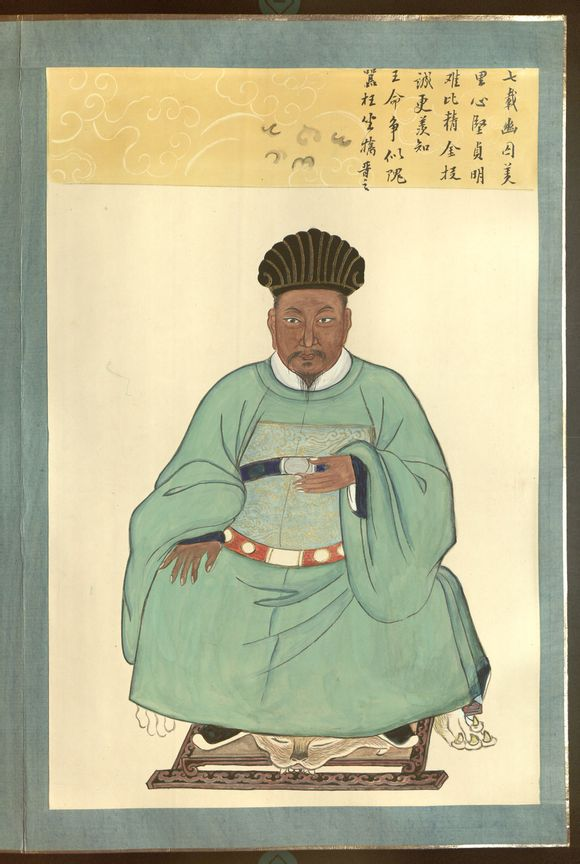
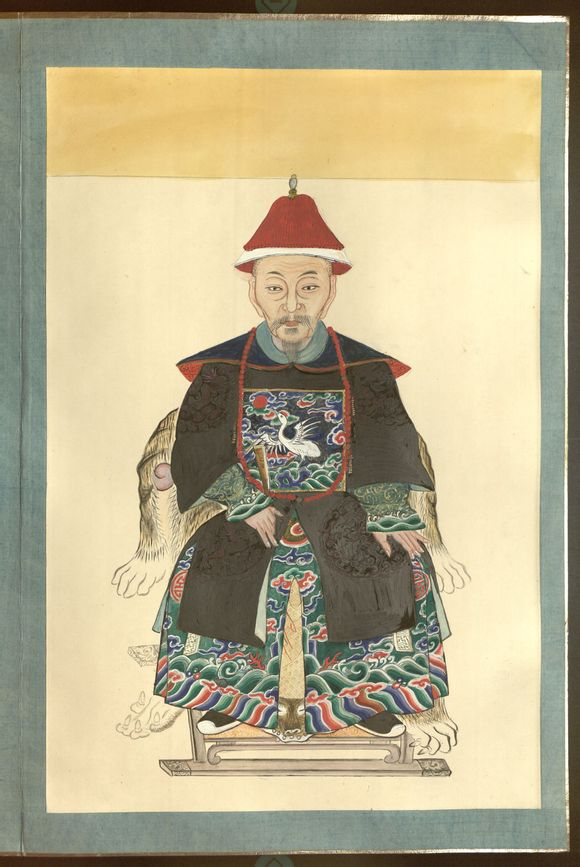
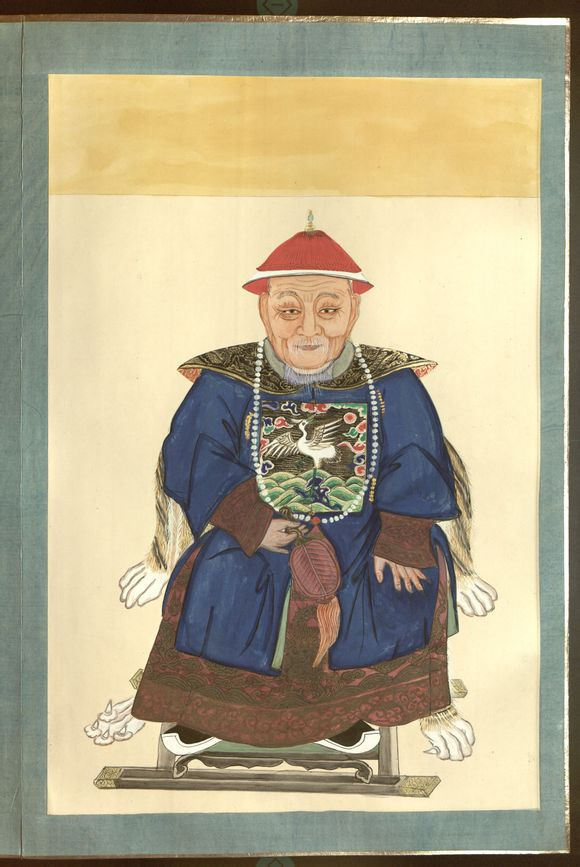
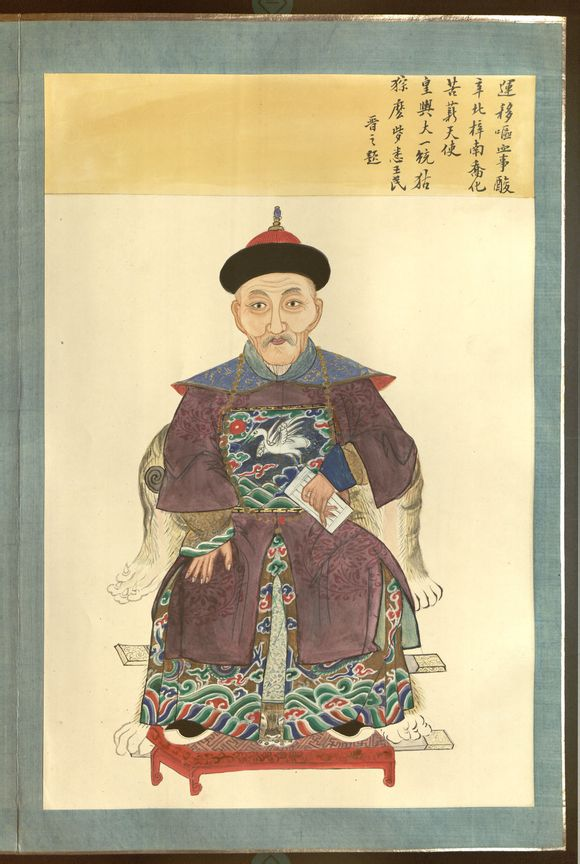
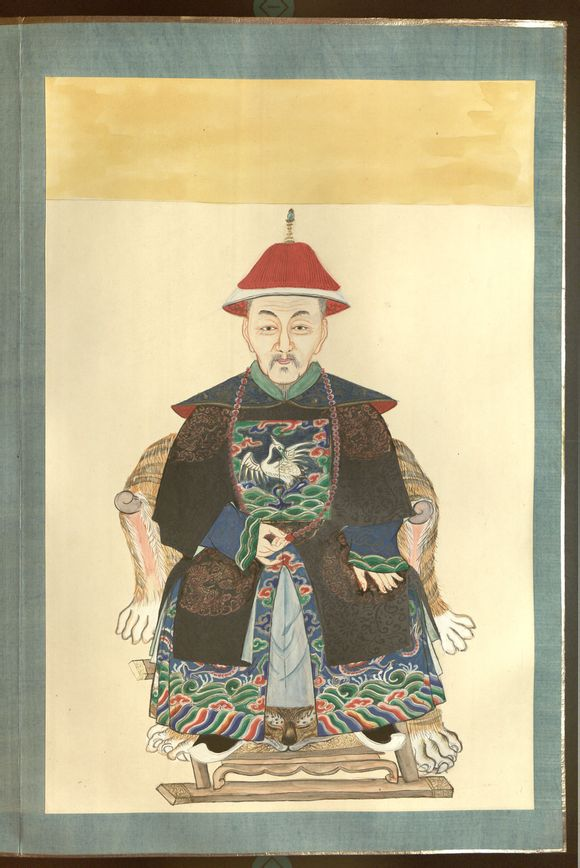
Portrait	Nakhi name	Chinese name	Reign	Notes
	Acong Aliang 阿琮阿良		?–?
	Aliang Ahu 阿良阿胡		?–?
	Ahu Alie 阿胡阿烈		?–?
	Alie Ajia 阿烈阿甲		?–?
	Ajia Ade 阿甲阿得	Mu De 木得	?–1390	started to use the surname "Mu"
	Ade Achu 阿得阿初	Mu Chu 木初	1390–1416
	Achu Adu 阿初阿土	Mu Tu 木土	1416–1433
	Adu Adi 阿土阿地	Mu Sen 木森	1433–1442
	Adi Axi 阿地阿習	Mu Qin 木嶔	1442–1485
	Axi Aya 阿習阿牙	Mu Tai 木泰	1485–1502
	Aya Aqiu 阿牙阿秋	Mu Ding 木定	1502–1526
	Aqiu Agong 阿秋阿公	Mu Gong 木公	1526–1553
	Agong Amu 阿公阿目	Mu Gao 木高	1553–1568
	Amu Adu 阿目阿都	Mu Dong 木東	1568–1579
	Adu Asheng 阿都阿勝	Mu Wang 木旺	1579–1596
	Asheng Azhai 阿勝阿宅	Mu Qing 木青	1596–1597
	Azhai Asi 阿宅阿寺	Mu Zeng 木增	1597–1623
	Asi Achun 阿寺阿春	Mu Yi 木懿	1623–1669
	Achun Asu 阿春阿俗	Mu Jing 木靖	1669–1671
		Mu You 木櫾	1671–1680
	Asu Awei 阿俗阿胃	Mu Yao 木堯	1680–1684
	Aw-Wùa Aw-Khü	Mu Xing 木興	1684–1720
	Aw-Khü A-dzu	Mu Zhong 木鐘	1722–1723	title abolished in 1723

== See also ==
- Chiefdom of Yongning

== Sources ==
- Mushi Huanpu (PDF) (in Chinese). 1900. OCLC 733553244.
- Joseph F Rock (1947). The ancient Na-khi Kingdom of southwest China. Harvard University Press. OCLC 2460083.
- Karl Debreczeny (August 2013). "Si tu paṇ chen's Artistic Legacy in 'Jang" (PDF). Journal of the International Association of Tibetan Studies (7): 193–276. ISSN 1550-6363.
- Bin Yang (2008). "Chapter 4: Rule Based on Native Customs". Between Winds and Clouds: The Making of Yunnan. Columbia University Press. OCLC 804536239.
