= Vanessa Mock =

German radio journalist

Vanessa Mock is a German radio journalist currently working as a Brussels correspondent for Radio Netherlands. She is the author of highly acclaimed radio stories such as the EU condom regulation story.

She was born Vanessa Dunya Mock in Marly-la-Ville in the Val d'Oise department of France, near Paris in 1975. The family moved to Birmingham, the United Kingdom when she was 9 years old. She was educated at Emmanuel College, Cambridge University and graduated with a joint honours degree in French and German. She speaks several languages, including English, French, German, Spanish, Dutch, and Italian.

She started journalism with the Financial Times Newsletter in London, specialising in telecommunications issues. In 2001 she moved to Switzerland to work for the English-language service of Swiss Radio International, covering mostly Swiss politics. She joined Radio Netherlands in 2004 after she moved to Amsterdam, the Netherlands, the same year. She went on to become one of the station's Brussels correspondents in 2006. Her responsibilities include covering the European Union (EU) and the North Atlantic Treaty Organization (NATO) for the station's English- and Spanish-language service.

Vanessa Mock hosted the 2010 AIBs, the international media excellence awards organised by the Association for International Broadcasting. The AIBs took place at LSO St Luke's in London.
