= Kala Township, Sichuan =

Kala Township 卡拉乡
- Township
- Kalaxiang
- Location in Sichuan
- Coordinates: 28°20′58″N 101°19′13″E
- Country: People's Republic of China
- Province: Sichuan
- Autonomous prefecture: Liangshan Yi Autonomous Prefecture
- County: Muli Tibetan Autonomous County

Area
  - Total: 1,161 km^{2} (448 sq mi)

Population (2010)
  - Total: 4,592
  - Density: 3.955/km^{2} (10.24/sq mi)
- Time zone: UTC+8 (China Standard)

Kala (Chinese: 卡拉乡) is a township in Muli Tibetan Autonomous County, Liangshan Yi Autonomous Prefecture, Sichuan, China. In 2010, Kala Township had a total population of 4,592: 2,558 males and 2,034 females: 917 aged under 14, 3,394 aged between 15 and 65 and 281 aged over 65.
