= Russell Mock =

American judge

Russell 'Russ' Mock

Presiding Judge, Ohio First District Court of Appeals
- In office January 2015 – February 2021

Judge, Hamilton County Municipal Court
- In office July 6, 2004 – January 2015

Personal details
- Children: 2
- Education: Ohio Northern University School of Law; University of Dayton
- Website: Official Website

Russell 'Russ' Mock is an American judge who formerly served on the First District Court of Appeals for the State of Ohio. Judge Mock is serving his third term as the court's Presiding and Administrative Judge. The Court of Appeals is the second highest court in Ohio, second to the Supreme Court of Ohio. Prior to his election to the Court of Appeals, Mock served for a decade on the Hamilton County Municipal Court, where he served two terms as the presiding judge over the municipal court. Mock also volunteered to run the Hamilton County Housing Court. Judge Mock is a member of the Ohio State Bar Association, the Cincinnati Bar Association and the Ohio Judicial Conference where he serves on the Appellate Law & Procedure Committee.

== Education ==
Russell Mock attended the University of Dayton where he received his undergraduate degree in 1991. Following his graduation, Mock enrolled at the Ohio Northern University School of Law where he received his Juris Doctor in 1995.

== Early career ==
Russell Mock was admitted to the Ohio State Bar Association in 1996. In June 1996, Mock began his work in private practice. While in private practice, he specialized in family, probate, commercial, and criminal defense law. In 2001, Mock joined the Hamilton County Prosecutors Office where he served as an assistant prosecuting attorney. Mock served at the prosecutors office until his appointment to the Hamilton County Municipal Court in 2004.

== Judicial career ==
=== Municipal Court ===
In June 2004, Russell Mock was appointed to the Hamilton County Municipal Court by Ohio Governor Bob Taft. Mock assumed office on July 6, 2004. Mock was re-elected to the Hamilton County Municipal Court in 2011. He defeated Martha Good in the general election on November 8, 2011. He won 62.4 percent of the vote. During his time on the municipal court bench, Mock served two terms as the presiding judge over the Municipal Court. During this time, Mock volunteered to serve on the county's housing court, which he ran for eight years. As part of his work with the Housing Court, Mock started a program to help compulsive hoarders in conjunction with the housing nonprofit Talbert House.

=== Ohio First District Court of Appeals ===
In 2014, Mock defeated Fanon Rucker in the general election on November 4, 2014, receiving 58.5 percent of the vote. He assumed the bench in February 2015. In 2017, Mock was elected to serve as the Presiding and Administrative Judge over the court. Mock is currently serving his third term as Presiding and Administrative Judge. Judge Mock was appointed by Ohio Supreme Court Chief Justice Maureen O’Connor to serve as a member of the Commission on Professionalism.

Judge Mock is a member of the Ohio State Bar Association, the Cincinnati Bar Association and the Ohio Judicial Conference. There, he serves on the Judicial Ethics, Professionalism & Diversity and Public Confidence & Community Outreach Committees.

Judge Russell Mock Associations
- Member, Association of Municipal and County Court Judges of Ohio
- Member, Ohio State Bar Association
- Member, Cincinnati Bar Association
- Member, Ohio Judicial Conference
- Chair, Municipal Court Probation Committee
- Judicial Ethics and Professional Committee
- Civil Law/Criminal Law Procedure Committee
- Council on Child Abuse, Pro-Kids, And Boys and Girls Clubs of Greater Cincinnati
