= Mok Kit Keung =

Cook (died 2021)

Mok Kit-keung (莫傑強; died 2021), also spelled as Mok Kit Keung, was a Hong Kong-born Chinese cook.

== Biography ==
Mok Kit-keung was born in Hong Kong. He starting working at an early age and became a dishwasher at a restaurant, owned by his uncle, when he was aged 13.

In 2017, he moved to Singapore and joined Shangri-La Singapore as head chef. Previously, he worked at Shang Palace and in 2012 due to his contributions, it received a Michelin star twice, last one in 2012. He also worked as a cook for Mohammed VI of Morocco and Vladimir Putin.

In 2021, he died at the age of 58.

== Awards ==
- Restaurant Association of Singapore
