= Mu Qing (journalist) =

Chinese journalist and politician (1921–2003)

- 穆青
- Born: March 15, 1921; Bengbu, Anhui, China
- Died: October 11, 2003 (aged 82)
- Political party: Chinese Communist Party

Mù Qīng (Chinese: 穆青; March 15, 1921 – October 11, 2003) was a Chinese journalist and politician. He was known for his contributions to Chinese journalism in the 20th century. He was a reporter at Xinhua News Agency for decades before becoming its President. Most of his works were published in journalism textbooks and have been used widely throughout China.

== Biography ==
=== Youth ===
Mu was born in Bengbu, Anhui in 1921. After attending secondary school in Henan he joined the Eighth Route Army, and in 1937, at the age of 16, he was responsible for a number of propaganda works. He joined the Chinese Communist Party in 1939 and entered the Lu Xun Academy of Art (鲁迅艺术学院) a year later.

=== War Correspondent ===
Mu commenced his career in journalism as a war correspondent in Jiefang Daily in the year 1942. Early in his career, he engaged in covering news stories on war, including the Sino-Japanese War (1937–1945) and the Chinese Civil War. After Japan had surrendered in 1945, Mu was sent to the North-eastern China and established Dongfang Daily (东方日报).

=== Career in Xinhua ===
After the founding of the People's Republic of China (PRC) in 1949, Mu was promoted to a senior level in the Xinhua News Agency. In 1951, Mu was given the title of Vice President for the Xinhua Headquarters in Beijing. Later in 1955, he moved from the Headquarters to the Xinhua News Agency main office in Shanghai, where he was President for the next three years.

In 1982, Mu became the Chief President of Xinhua until his retirement in 1992. On October 11, 2003 he died from lung cancer in Beijing.

== Famous works by Mu Qing ==
=== Correspondences ===
- An Unfinished News Report (一篇沒有寫完的報道)
- For Premier Zhou's Exhortation (為了周總理的囑託——記農民科學家吳吉昌)
- Jiao Yulu – A Good Example of the Secretaries of the County Committee of the Communist Party (縣委書記的榜樣——焦裕祿)
- Judgement of history (歷史的審判)
- Last Supper (最後的晚餐)
- Revolution has begun again!(革命又回來了！)
- Save Africa(救救非洲)
- Wang Jinxi the Iron Man(鐵人王進喜)
- Under the Leaning Tower (在斜塔下)

=== Books ===
- Ding ci yishu (《定瓷藝術》) (2002)
- Xinwen san lun (《新聞散論》) (Talking about News) (1996)
- Jiao yu lu (《焦裕祿》) (1980)
- Mingdai minyao qinghua (《明代民窯青花》) (With Tang Weijian) (2000)
- Mu Qing sanwen xuan (《穆青散文選》) (1984)
- Shi ge gongchandangyuan (《十個共產黨員》) (10 Communists)
- Weiyena de xuanlü (《維也納的旋律》) (The Melody of Vienna) (1983)
- Xiang zhong de hongqi (《湘中的紅旗》)(1950)
- Xinwen gongzuo san lun (《新聞工作散論》) (1983)
- Zhongguo xin wenyi daxi, 1937–1949. Baogao wenxue ji (《中國新文藝大系, 1937–1949. 報告文學集》) (Edited by Mu Qing) (1996)
- Zhongguo xin wenyi daxi, 1949–1966. Baogao wenxue ji (《中國新文藝大系, 1949–1966. 報告文學集》) (Edited by Mu Qing) (1987)

=== Photographic Work ===
- Selected photographic works of Mu Qing (穆青攝影選)

=== Calligraphy ===
- Selected calligraphies of Mu Qing (穆青書法作品選)
