= Mu Zeng =

- Native chieftain of Lijiang; Magistrate of Lijiang
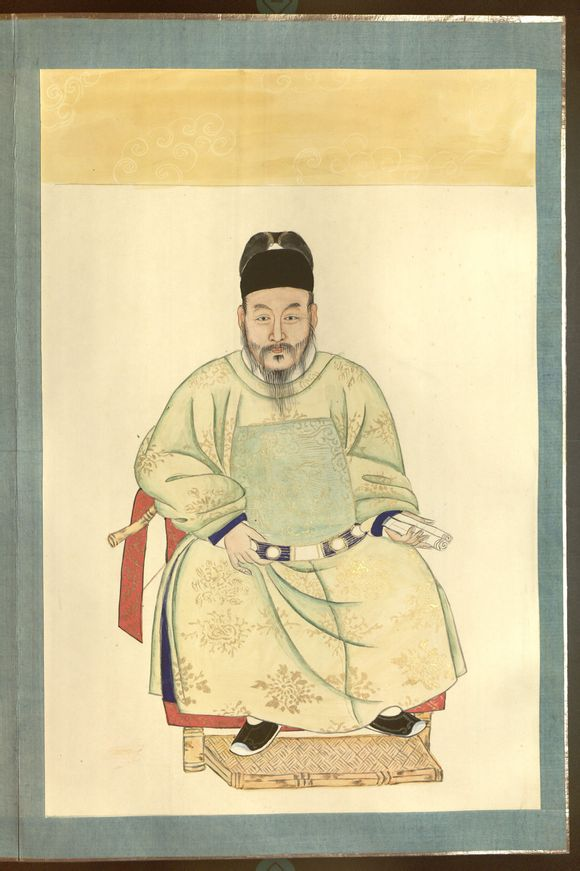

Native chieftain of Lijiang
- Reign: 1600 – 1624
- Predecessor: Mu Qing
- Successor: Mu Yi
- Born: September 19, 1587; Lijiang
- Died: September 9, 1646 (aged 58); Lijiang
Names
- Mu Zeng (木增, Chinese name); A-chai A-ssu (Nakhi name)
Regnal name
- Magistrate of Lijiang (麗江知府)

Mu Zeng (Chinese: 木增, September 19, 1587 – September 9, 1646), also known as A-chai A-ssu in Nakhi, was the native chieftain of Lijiang between 1597 and 1623. He was born to Mu Qing (Chinese: 木青) and Ashijia (Chinese: 阿室加) and ascended the throne when he was ten years old. The chieftain was known for his literature and wrote many anthologies.

In 1624, he announced his privacy and gave his position to his son, Mu Yi (Chinese: 木懿).

Mu Zeng welcomed Xu Xiake when he came to Lijiang in 1640.

Mu Zeng
Previous: Mu Qing	Native chieftain of Lijiang; 1600—1624	Next: Mu Yi
