= Mu Qing (chieftain) =

- Native chieftain of Lijiang; Magistrate of Lijiang
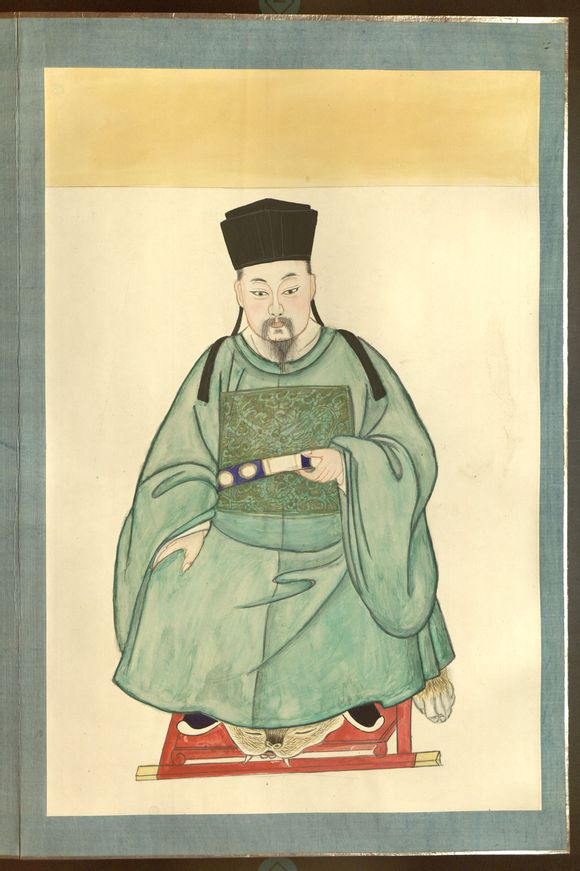

Native chieftain of Lijiang
- Reign: 1596 – 1597
- Predecessor: Mu Wang
- Successor: Mu Zeng
- Born: September 18, 1569; Lijiang
- Died: November 23, 1597 (aged 28); Lijiang
Names
- Mu Qing (木青, Chinese name); A-sheng A-chai (Nakhi name)
Regnal name
- Magistrate of Lijiang (麗江知府)

Mu Qing (Chinese: 木青; September 18, 1569 – November 23, 1597), also known as A-sheng A-chai (his Nakhi name), was the 19th native chieftain of Lijiang.

He was known by the literary names of Qiaoyue (乔岳) or Songhe (松鹤), and wrote the book Yu Shui Qing Yin, as well as poetry.

Mu Qing
Previous: Mu Wang	Tusi of Lijiang; 1596—1597	Next: Mu Zeng
