= Burmo-Qiangic languages =

Proposed family of Sino-Tibetan languages

Burmo-Qiangic
- Eastern Tibeto-Burman
- (proposed)
- Geographic distribution: China, Burma
- Linguistic classification: Sino-Tibetan: Burmo-Qiangic
- Subdivisions: Lolo-Burmese; Qiangic; Tujia?

Language codes
- Glottolog: burm1265

The Burmo-Qiangic or Eastern Tibeto-Burman languages are a proposed family of Sino-Tibetan languages spoken in Southwest China and Myanmar. It consists of the Lolo-Burmese and Qiangic branches, including the extinct Tangut language.

== Classification ==
Guillaume Jacques & Alexis Michaud (2011) argue for a Burmo-Qiangic branch of Sino-Tibetan (Tibeto-Burman) with two primary subbranches, Qiangic and Lolo-Burmese. Similarly, David Bradley (2008) proposes an Eastern Tibeto-Burman branch that includes Burmic (a.k.a. Lolo-Burmese) and Qiangic. Bradley notes that Lolo-Burmese and Qiangic share some unique lexical items, even though they are morphologically quite different; whereas all Lolo-Burmese languages are tonal and analytical, Qiangic languages are often non-tonal and possess agglutinative morphology. However the position of Naic is unclear, as it has been grouped as Lolo-Burmese by Lama (2012), but as Qiangic by Jacques & Michaud (2011) and Bradley (2008).

Sun (1988) also proposed a similar classification that grouped Qiangic and Lolo-Burmese together.

Jacques' & Michaud's (2011) proposed tree is as follows.

- Burmo‑Qiangic
  - Lolo-Burmese
    - Burmish
    - Loloish
  - Na‑Qiangic
    - Naic
    - Qiangic
    - Ersuic

Bradley's (2008) proposal is as follows. Note that Bradley calls Lolo-Burmese Burmic, which is not to be confused with Burmish, and calls Loloish Ngwi.

- Eastern Tibeto‑Burman
  - Lolo-Burmese
    - Burmish
    - Loloish
  - Qiangic

However, Chirkova (2012) doubts that Qiangic is a valid genetic unit, and considers Ersu, Shixing, Namuyi, and Pumi all as separate Tibeto-Burman branches that are part of a Qiangic Sprachbund, rather than as part of a coherent Qiangic phylogenetic branch. This issue has also been further discussed by Yu (2012).

Lee & Sagart (2008) argue that Bai is a Tibeto-Burman language that has borrowed very heavily from Old Chinese. Lee & Sagart (2008) note that words relating to rice and pig agriculture tend to be non-Chinese, and that the genetic non-Chinese layer of Bai shows similarities with Proto-Loloish.

== Branches ==
Yu (2012:206–207) lists the following well-established coherent branches (including individual languages, in italics below) that could likely all fit into a wider Burmo-Qiangic group, in geographical order from north to south.

1. (Baima) [possible Burmo-Qiangic substratum]
2. Qiang
3. rGyalrong
4. Lavrung
5. Ergong
6. Choyo
7. nDrapa
8. Guiqiong
9. Minyak
10. Ersuic
11. Namuyi
12. Shixing
13. Naish
14. Prinmi
15. Lolo-Burmese
16. (Bai) [possible Burmo-Qiangic substratum]

Additionally, Tangut, now extinct, is generally classified as a Qiangic language.

Yu (2012:215–218) notes that Ersuic and Naic languages could possibly group together, since they share many features with each other that are not found in Lolo-Burmese or other Qiangic groups.

Proto-language reconstructions for some of these branches include:

- Proto-Rma (Sims 2017)
- Proto-Prinmi (Sims 2017)
- Proto-Ersuic (Yu 2012)
- Proto-Naish (Jacques & Michaud 2011)
- Proto-Lolo-Burmese (Matisoff 2003)
- Proto-Bai (Wang 2006)

== Lexical evidence ==
Jacques & Michaud (2011) list the following lexical items as likely Burmo-Qiangic lexical innovations.

Gloss	rGyalrong	Tangut	Na	Proto-Naish	Burmese	Achang	Hani
copula	ŋu	ŋwu^{2}	ŋi˩˧	?	hnang^{2}	–	ŋɯ˧˩
star	ʑŋgri	gjịj^{1}	kɯ˥	*kri	kray^{2}	k^{h}ʐə˥	a˧˩gɯ˥
forget	jmɯt	mjɨ̣^{2}	mv̩.p^{h}æ^{L+MH}	*mi	me^{1}	ɲi˧˥	ɲi˥
be ill	ngo < *ngaŋ	ŋo^{2}	gu˩	*go			
flint	ʁdɯrtsa	–	tse.mi^{H}	*tsa			
to hide	nɤtsɯ	–	tsɯ˥ (Naxi)	*tsu			
to swallow	mqlaʁ	–	ʁv̩˥	*NqU < *Nqak			
dry	spɯ	-	pv̩˧	*Spu			
thick	jaʁ	laa^{1}	lo˧˥	*laC_{2}			
jump	mtsaʁ	–	ts^{h}o˧	*ts^{h}aC_{2}			
winter	qartsɯ	tsur^{1}	ts^{h}i˥	*ts^{h}u	c^{h}oŋ^{3}	tɕ^{h}ɔŋ˧˩	ts^{h}ɔ˧˩ga̱˧
knee	tə-mŋɑ (Situ)	ŋwer^{2}	ŋwɤ.ko^{H}	*ŋwa			
sun	ʁmbɣi	be^{2}	bi˧ (Naxi)	*bi			

== See also ==
- Bailang language
