= Namuyi language =

Language of Sichuan and Tibet

Namuzi
- Namuyi
- Native to: China
- Native speakers: 5,000 (2007)
- Language family: Sino-Tibetan: Tibeto-Burman; Loloish or Qiangic (?); Naic; Namuzi

Language codes
- ISO 639-3: nmy
- Glottolog: namu1246
- ELP: Namuyi
- Namuyi is classified as Vulnerable by the UNESCO Atlas of the World's Languages in Danger

Namuyi (Namuzi; autonym: na54 mʑi54) is a Tibeto-Burman language belonging to the Naic branch, spoken by approximately 10,000 people. It is primarily spoken in southern Sichuan. Namuyi has also been classified as Qiangic by Sun Hongkai (2001) and Guillaume Jacques (2011). The eastern and western dialects have low mutual intelligibility. In Sichuan, it is spoken in Muli County and Mianning County. The language is endangered and the number of speakers with fluency is decreasing year by year, as most teenagers do not speak the language, instead speaking the Sichuan dialect of Chinese.

== Geographical distribution ==
Namuyi is a language spoken in the following four villages of southern Sichuan:

- dʐә11 qu11 (Namuyi name): Dàshuǐ Village 大水村, Mínshèng Township 民胜鄉, Xīchāng City (80 ethnic Namuyi)
- dʑa53 qa53 tu11 (Namuyi name): Хiǎngshuǐ Village 響水村, Xiǎngshuǐ Township 響水鄉, Xīchāng City (800 ethnic Namuyi)
- ɕa11 ma11 khu53 (Namuyi name): Dōngfēng Village 東風村, Zéyuǎn Township 澤遠鄉, Miǎnníng County (560 ethnic Namuyi)
- ʂa44 pa53 (Namuyi name): Lǎoyā Village 老鴉村, Shābà Town 沙壩鎮, Miǎnníng County (290 ethnic Namuyi)

It is also spoken in Muli and Yanyuan of the Liangshan Autonomous Prefecture and Jiulong County in Ganzi Autonomous Prefecture.

== Dialects ==
The Namuyi language is subdivided into two different dialects, the dialect of spoken by the people around Muli, and the dialect of those spoken in Mianning. The dialects differ mainly in phonology, where the Mianning and Yanyuan dialect have few consonant clusters as opposed to the Jiulong and Muli dialect.

== Phonology ==
There are 40 single-consonant initials in the Namuyi language. Namuyi also has ten phonemic vowels, /i/ for [i], /e/ for [e], /ɛ/ for [ɛ], /ɨ/ for [ʃ,ɯ] /ʉ/ for [y], /ə/ for [ə], /a/ for [a], /u/ for [u], /o/ for [o], and /ɔ/ for [ɔ]. There is no phonological vowel length, though speakers can lengthen a vowel in the first syllable at times to emphasize a word.

		Bilabial		Alveolar		Retroflex	Palatal	Velar	Uvular	Glottal
		plain	trilled	plain	trilled	Retroflex	Palatal	Velar	Uvular	Glottal
Nasal		m		n			ɲ	ŋ		
Stop	voiceless	p	pʙ̥	t	tʙ̥ (Note: Pavlík 2017, p. 22 regards /tʙ̥/ as having a voiced bilabial trill release /tʙ/, rather than voiceless.)			k	q	(ʔ)
Stop	voiced	b	bʙ	d	dʙ			ɡ	ɢ	
Stop	aspirated	pʰ		tʰ				kʰ	qʰ	
Affricate	voiceless			t͡s		t͡ʂ	t͡ɕ			
Affricate	voiced			d͡z		d͡ʐ	d͡ʑ			
Affricate	aspirated	pʰ͡s, pʰ͡ʂ		t͡sʰ		t͡ʂʰ	t͡ɕʰ			
Fricative	voiceless	f		s		ʂ		x	χ	
Fricative	voiced	v		z		ʐ			ʁ	ɦ
Approximant	voiceless			l̥						
Approximant	voiced	w		l			j			
