= Garzê Tibetan Autonomous Prefecture =

Coordinates: 30°02′58″N 101°57′44″E

Garzê Tibetan Autonomous Prefecture 甘孜州
- Autonomous prefecture

Chinese transcription(s)
  - Chinese characters: 甘孜藏族自治州 (abbreviation: 甘孜州)
  - Hanyu pinyin: Gānzī Zàngzú Zìzhìzhōu (abbreviation: Gānzī Zhōu)

Tibetan transcription(s)
  - Tibetan script: དཀར་མཛེས་བོད་རིགས་རང་སྐྱོང་ཁུལ་།
  - Wylie transliteration: dkar mdzes bod rigs rang skyong khul
  - Tibetan pinyin: Garzê Poirig Ranggyong Kü
- Larung Gar

- Location of Ganzi Tibetan Autonomous Prefecture in Sichuan
- Country: China
- Province: Sichuan
- Prefecture seat: Kangding

Government
  - Type: Autonomous prefecture
  - CCP Secretary: Liu Chengming
  - Congress Chairman: Xiang Qiu
  - Governor: Xiao Youcai
  - CPPCC Chairman: Shu Dachun

Area
  - Total: 147,681.37 km^{2} (57,020.10 sq mi)

Population (2020 census)
  - Total: 1,107,431
  - Density: 7.498786/km^{2} (19.42177/sq mi)

GDP (2025)
  - Total: CN¥ 61.31 billion US$ 8.53 billion
  - Per capita: CN¥ 54,987; US$ 7,650
- Time zone: UTC+8 (China Standard)
- ISO 3166 code: CN-SC-33
- Website: www.gzz.gov.cn

Garzê Tibetan Autonomous Prefecture

Chinese name
- Chinese: 甘孜藏族自治州
Transcriptions
Standard Mandarin
- Hanyu Pinyin: Gānzī Zàngzú Zìzhìzhōu

Abbreviation
- Chinese: 甘孜州
Transcriptions
Standard Mandarin
- Hanyu Pinyin: Gānzī Zhōu

Tibetan name
- Tibetan: དཀར་མཛེས་བོད་རིགས་རང་སྐྱོང་ཁུལ་།
Transcriptions
- Wylie: dkar mdzes bod rigs rang skyong khul
- Tibetan Pinyin: Garzê Poirig Ranggyong Kü

Garzê Tibetan Autonomous Prefecture, (Note: Chinese: 甘孜藏族自治州; pinyin: Gānzī Zàngzú Zìzhìzhōu; Tibetan: དཀར་མཛེས་བོད་རིགས་རང་སྐྱོང་ཁུལ་, Wylie: dkar mdzes bod rigs rang skyong khul, THL: Kardzé Börik Rangkyongkhül, ZWPY: Garzê Poirig Ranggyong Kü) often shortened to Ganzi Prefecture, (Note: Chinese: 甘孜州; pinyin: Gānzī Zhōu) is an autonomous prefecture in the western arm of Sichuan province, China bordering Yunnan to the south, the Tibet Autonomous Region to the west, and Gansu to the north and northwest.

The prefecture's area is 151,078 square kilometres (58,332 mi^{2}). The population is approximately 880,000, with Tibetans accounting for 77.8% of the total population. The capital city of Garzê is Kangding (Dartsedo).

== History ==
Garzê was traditionally part of the historical region of Kham and formed a borderland between the Tibetan Empire and its successor states and Imperial China. Its seat Kangding (under its Tibetan name Darzêdo) was the capital of the Kingdom of Chakla, which resisted Tibetan taxation by becoming a satellite state of the Qing Empire from the 17th to 20th centuries. As the Qing state weakened, local resistance to its dictates led to the 1905 Batang Uprising and a retaliatory punitive campaign by the assistant amban Zhao Erfeng.

During the Republican Period (1912–1949), Garzê was initially organized with most of Kham as Xikang Province. In 1930, the Tibetan army invaded Garzê, capturing it without much resistance. However, in 1932, the Tibetan army withdrew after suffering defeats elsewhere at the hands of the warlord of Qinghai, Ma Bufang. The Chinese warlord Liu Wenhui occupied Garzê and signed an agreement with the Tibetans formalizing his control of the area east of the upper Yangtze, which corresponds roughly with eastern Kham (see Sino-Tibetan War).

In the final stages of the Chinese Civil War, Garzê remained under Kuomintang control until 1950, when it was surrendered to the PLA and the People's Republic of China. Eastern Xikang was merged with Sichuan in 1955, with Garzê being granted autonomous status owing to its large minority population.

== Population ==
According to the census of 2000, Garzê had a registered population of 897,239 (population density: 5.94 people/km^{2}).

nationality	population	proportion
Tibetans	703,168	78.37%
Han Chinese	163,648	18.24%
Yi	22,946	2.56%
Qiang	2,860	0.32%
Hui	2,190	0.24%
Naxi	760	0.08%
Mongolians	477	0.05%
Bai	292	0.03%
others	898	0.11%

== Languages ==
Garzê is linguistically diverse, having many variants of Tibetan as well as several Qiangic languages:

- Kangding: Guiqiong, Muya
- Luding County: Muya
- Danba County: rGyalrong
- Jiulong County: Pumi (Southern)
- Yajiang County: Zhaba
- Dawu County: Horpa
- Xinlong County: Queyu

== Religion ==
Tibetan Buddhism is historically the predominant religion practiced in Garzê. Some notable Gompas here include:

- Dzogchen Monastery
- Dzongsar Monastery
- Kandze Monastery
- Kharnang Monastery
- Nanwu Si Monastery
- Palpung Monastery
- Sershul Monastery
- Tongkor Monastery
- Larung Gar Buddhist Institute
- Yarchen Gar Buddhist Institute

== Subdivisions ==
Garzê comprises 1 county-level city and 17 counties:

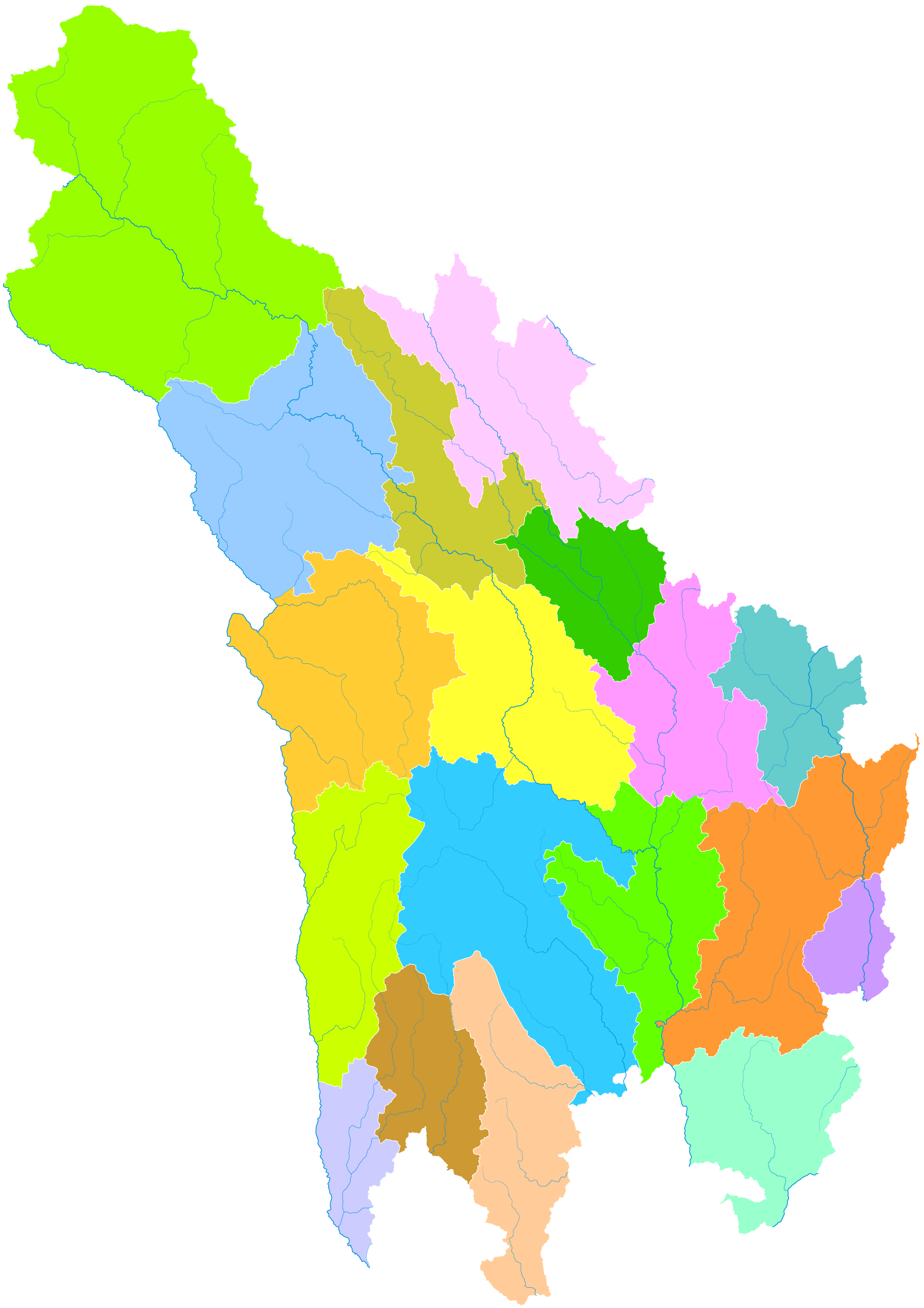

#	Name	Hanzi	Hanyu Pinyin	Tibetan	Wylie	Population (2010 Census)	Area (km^{2})	Density (/km^{2})
1	Kangding City	康定市	Kāngdìng Shì	དར་མདོ་གྲོང་ཁྱེར་	dar mdo grong khyer	130,142	11,486	11.33
2	Luding County	泸定县	Lúdìng Xiàn	ལྕགས་ཟམ་རྫོང་	lcags zam rdzong	83,386	2,165	38.51
3	Danba County	丹巴县	Dānbā Xiàn	རོང་བྲག་རྫོང་	rong brag rdzong	59,696	4,656	12.82
4	Jiulong County	九龙县	Jiǔlóng Xiàn	བརྒྱད་ཟུར་རྫོང་	brgyad zur rdzong	62,133	6,766	9.18
5	Yajiang County	雅江县	Yǎjiāng Xiàn	ཉག་ཆུ་རྫོང་	nyag chu rdzong	50,225	7,558	6.64
6	Dawu County (Daofu County)	道孚县	Dàofú Xiàn	རྟ་འུ་རྫོང་	rta 'u rdzong	55,396	7,053	7.85
7	Luhuo County	炉霍县	Lúhuò Xiàn	བྲག་འགོ་རྫོང་	brag 'go rdzong	46,558	4,601	10.11
8	Garzê County (Ganzi County)	甘孜县	Gānzī Xiàn	དཀར་མཛེས་རྫོང་	dkar mdzes rdzong	68,523	7,303	9.38
9	Xinlong County	新龙县	Xīnlóng Xiàn	ཉག་རོང་རྫོང་	nyag rong rdzong	50,393	8,570	5.88
10	Dêgê County (Dege County)	德格县	Dégé Xiàn	སྡེ་དགེ་རྫོང་	sde dge rdzong	81,503	11,025	7.39
11	Baiyü County	白玉县	Báiyù Xiàn	དཔལ་ཡུལ་རྫོང་	dpal yul rdzong	56,290	10,386	5.41
12	Sêrxü County (Shiqu County)	石渠县	Shíqú Xiàn	སེར་ཤུལ་རྫོང་	ser shul rdzong	80,834	24,944	3.24
13	Sêrtar County (Seda County)	色达县	Sèdá Xiàn	གསེར་ཐར་རྫོང་	gser thar rdzong	58,606	9,332	6.28
14	Litang County	理塘县	Lǐtáng Xiàn	ལི་ཐང་རྫོང་	li thang rdzong	69,046	13,677	5.04
15	Batang County	巴塘县	Bātáng Xiàn	འབའ་ཐང་རྫོང་	'ba' thang rdzong	48,649	7,852	6.19
16	Xiangcheng County	乡城县	Xiāngchéng Xiàn	ཕྱག་འཕྲེང་རྫོང་	phyag 'phreng rdzong	33,170	5,016	6.61
17	Daocheng County	稻城县	Dàochéng Xiàn	འདབ་པ་རྫོང་	'dab pa rdzong	31,113	7,323	4.24
18	Dêrong County	得荣县	Déróng Xiàn	སྡེ་རོང་རྫོང་	sde rong rdzong	26,209	2,916	8.98
