= Muya language =

Sino-Tibetan language spoken in China

Muya
- Munya
- Native to: China
- Region: Sichuan
- Native speakers: Eastern: 2,000 (2020); Western: 12,000 (2020)
- Language family: Sino-Tibetan: Tibeto-Burman; Qiangic; Northern; Muya
- Dialects: East; West

Language codes
- ISO 639-3: Either: emq – Eastern Minyag wmg – Western Minyag
- Glottolog: muya1239
- ELP: Muya
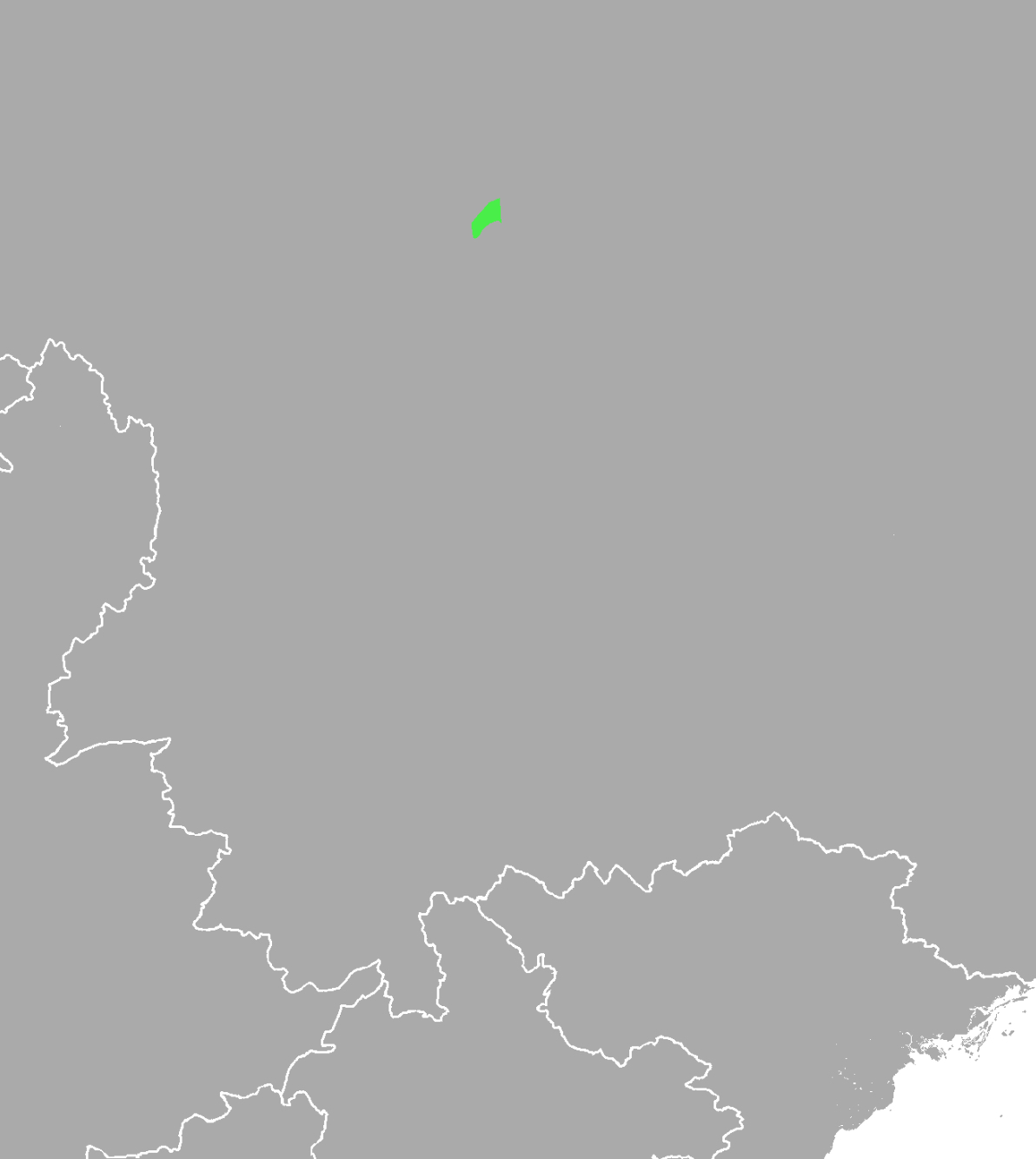

- Muya is classified as Vulnerable by the UNESCO Atlas of the World's Languages in Danger

Munya or Muya (simplified Chinese: 木雅语; traditional Chinese: 木雅語; also Manyak 曼牙科, Menia 么呢阿; Tibetan: མི་ཉག, Wylie: Mi nyak, THL: Minyak) is one of the Qiangic languages spoken in China. There are two dialects, Western and Eastern, which are not mutually intelligible. Most research on Munya has been conducted by Ikeda Takumi. There are about 2,000 monolinguals.

== Names ==
The language has been spelled in various ways, including Manyak, Menya, Minyag, and Minyak. Other names for the language are Boba and Miyao.

== Dialects ==
Ethnologue (21st edition) lists two Muya dialects, namely Eastern (Nyagrong) and Western (Darmdo). Muya is spoken in

- Shimian County, Ya'an
- Jiulong County
- Kangding

Sun (1991) documents Muya (木雅) of Liuba Township (六坝乡), Shade District (沙德区), Kangding County (康定县), Sichuan.

== Phonology ==
Consonants
| | | Labial | Alveolar | Retroflex | Alveolo-palatal | Velar | Uvular | Glottal |
|---|---|---|---|---|---|---|---|---|
| Plosive | oral | p b | t d | | | k g | q ɢ | |
| Plosive | aspirated | pʰ | tʰ | | | kʰ | qʰ | |
| Plosive | prenasalized | ᵐpʰ ᵐb | ⁿtʰ ⁿd | | | ᵑkʰ ᵑg | ᶰqʰ ᶰɢ | |
| Affricate | oral | | ts dz | ʈʂ ɖʐ | tɕ dʑ | | | |
| Affricate | aspirated | | tsʰ | ʈʂʰ | tɕʰ | | | |
| Affricate | prenasalized | | ⁿtsʰ ⁿdz | ⁿʈʂʰ ⁿɖʐ | ⁿtɕʰ ⁿdʑ | | | |
| Fricative | | f v | s z | ʂ ʐ | ɕ ʑ | x ɣ | χ ʁ | h ɦ |
| Nasal | | m | n | | ɲ | ŋ | | |
| Approximant | | w | l | | j | | | |

- /ʑ/ can sometimes be heard as [r].

Vowels
| | Front | | Central | Back |
| | Unrounded | Rounded | Central | Back |
|---|---|---|---|---|
| High | i ĩ | y | ɯ ɯ̰ | u ũ |
| Mid-high | e ẽ | ø | | o õ |
| Mid-low | ɛ ɛ̃ | | | ɔ |
| Low | æ æ̰ | | ɐ ɐ̰ | ɑ ɑ̃ |

Additionally, the following diphthongs have been observed: /yi/, /ui/, /ie/, /ye/, /ue/, /uø/, /iɛ̃/, /yɛ/, /yɛ̃/, /uɛ/, /uæ/, /uæ̰/, /yɐ/, /yɐ̰/, /uɐ/, /yɯ/, /uɯ/, /yɑ/, /yɑ̃/, /uɑ/.

Muya also has four tones:

- [ ˥ ] - high, level
- [ ˥˧ ] - high-falling
- [ ˧˥ ] - high-rising
- [ ˧ ] - mid, level

== Popular culture ==
In 2008, Bamu, a singer with the Jiuzhaigou Art Troupe in the Aba Tibetan and Qiang Autonomous Prefecture in Sichuan, recorded an album of Muya songs (木雅七韵).

== Bibliography ==
- Bai, Junwei (2019). A Grammar of Munya (PhD thesis). James Cook University. doi:10.25903/2SHV-X307.
- Drolma, Dawa; Suzuki, Hiroyuki (2016). Preliminary report on the Darmdo Minyag linguistic area, with a geolinguistic description of terms for ‘sun’.

Studies in Asian Geolinguistics 1. 72–78.

- Ikeda, Takumi (1998). "Mùyǎyǔ yǔyīn jiégòu de jǐ gè wèntí" 木雅語語音結構的幾個問題 [Some Phonological Features of Modern Munya (Minyak) Language]. Nairiku Ajia Gengo No Kenkyuu 内陸アジア言語の研究 (in Chinese). 13: 83–91. hdl:11094/16189.
- Ikeda, Takumi (2002). "On Pitch Accent in the Mu-Nya Language" (PDF). Linguistics of the Tibeto-Burman Area. 25 (2): 27–45. doi:10.32655/LTBA.25.2.02.
- Sun, Hongkai, ed. (1991). Zàngmiǎnyǔ yǔyīn hé cíhuì 藏缅语语音和词汇 [Tibeto-Burman Phonology and Lexicon] (in Chinese). Beijing: Zhongguo shehui kexue chubanshe.
- Minyak language elementary textbook, a project of the Kham Aid Foundation, 2009.
