= Pumi =

Pumi may refer to:

- Pumi people, ethnic group in China
- Pumi language, Tibeto-Burman language used by the Pumi people
- Pumi (dog), medium-small herding dog
