= Pumi language =

Qiangic language spoken in Yunnan, China

Pumi
- Prinmi
- psshinv miv ཕྷྷྲིནཀ་མིཀ་, prienv miv ཕྲནཀ་མིཀ་, psshonv mef ཕྷྷྲོནཀ་མེས་, prinv mev ཕྲིནཀ་མེཀ་, chinv mif ཁྲིནཀ་མིས་
- Native to: China
- Region: Sichuan, Yunnan
- Ethnicity: Pumi
- Native speakers: (54,000 cited 1999)
- Language family: Sino-Tibetan: Tibeto-Burman; Qiangic; Pumi
- Writing system: Tibetan script

Language codes
- ISO 639-3: Either: pmi – Northern Pumi pmj – Southern Pumi
- Glottolog: pumi1242
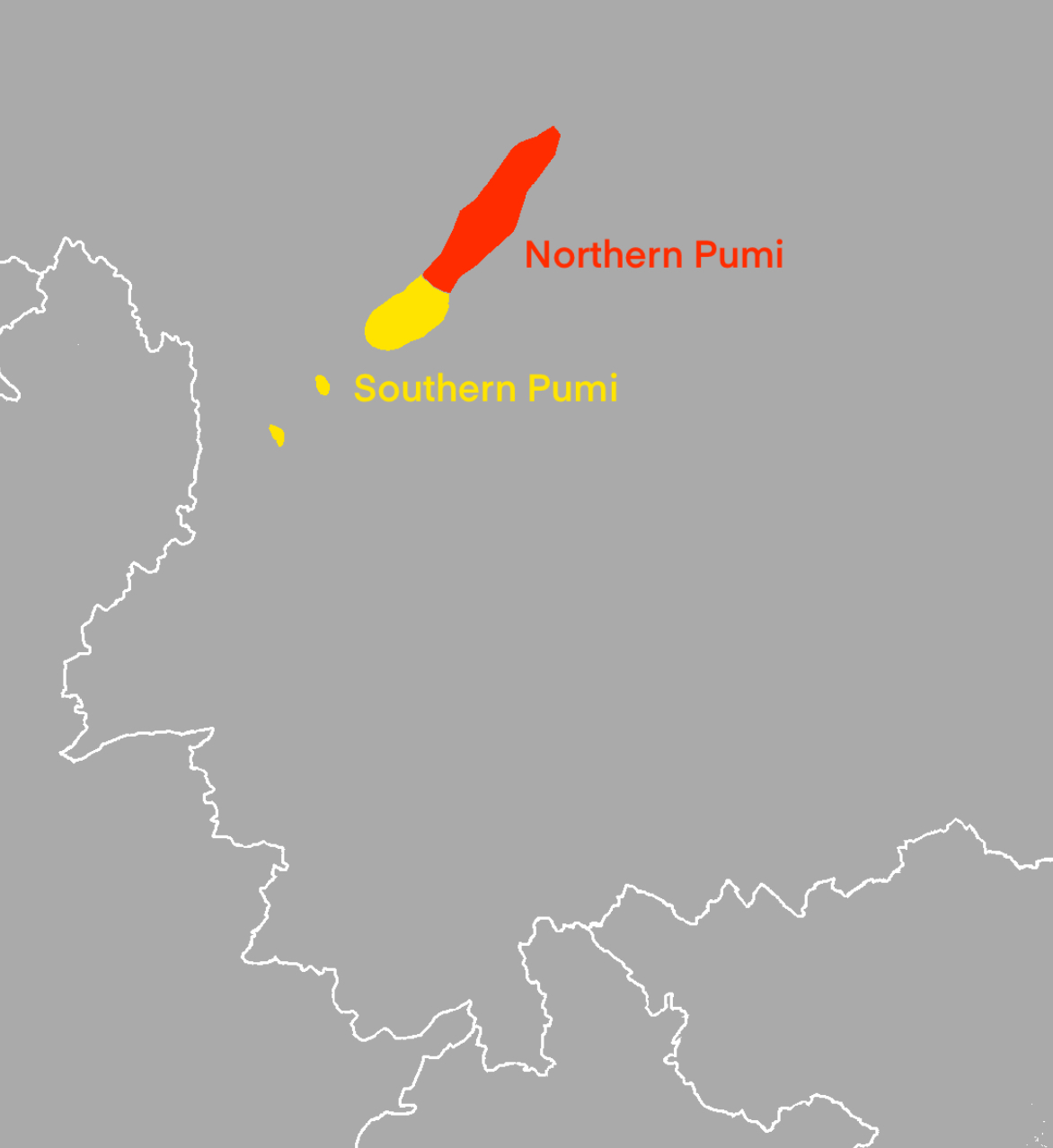

The Pumi language (also known as Prinmi) is a Qiangic language used by the Pumi people, an ethnic group from Yunnan, China, as well as by the Tibetan people of Muli in Sichuan, China. Most native speakers live in Lanping, Ninglang, Lijiang, Weixi and Muli.

The autonym of the Pumi is pʰʐə̃55 mi55 in Western Prinmi, pʰɹĩ55 mi55 in Central Prinmi, and pʰʐõ55 mə53 in Northern Prinmi with variants such as pʰɹə̃55 mə55 and tʂʰə̃55 mi53.

In Muli Bonpo-Buddhist priests read religious texts in Tibetan, which needs to be interpreted into Prinmi. An attempt to teach Pumi children to write their language using the Tibetan script has been seen in Ninglang. A pinyin-based Roman script has been proposed, but is not commonly used.

== Dialects ==
Earlier works suggest there are two branches of Pumi (southern and northern), and they are not mutually intelligible. Ding (2014) proposes three major groups: Western Prinmi (spoken in Lanping), Central Prinmi (spoken in southwestern Ninglang, Lijiang, Yulong and Yongsheng) and Northern Prinmi (spoken in northern Ninglang and Sichuan).

=== Lu (2001) ===
Dialects of Pumi include the following (Lu 2001).

Southern (22,000 speakers)

- Qinghua 箐花村, Lanping County, Yunnan
- Ludian 鲁甸县, Yunnan
- Xinyingpan 新营盘乡, Ninglang County, Yunnan

Northern (55,000 speakers)

- Taoba 桃巴村, Muli County, Sichuan
- Tuoqi 拖七村, Ninglang County, Yunnan
- Zuosuo 左所区, Yanyuan County, Sichuan
- Sanyanlong 三岩龙乡, Jiulong County, Sichuan

=== Sim (2017) ===
Sims (2017) lists the following dialects of Pumi.

- Northern
  - Sanyanlong 三岩龙 [Jiulong County] (B. Huang & Dai 1992)
  - Taoba 桃巴 [Muli County] (Sun 1991)
  - Shuiluo 水洛 [Muli County] (Jacques 2011)
- Central
  - Wadu 瓦都 [Ninglang County] (Daudey 2014)
  - Niuwozi 牛窝子 [Ninglang County] (Ding 2001, etc.)
- Southern
  - Dayang [Lanping County] (Matisoff 1997)
  - Qinghua 箐花 [Lanping County] (Sun 1991; B. Huang & Dai 1992)

Sims (2017) reconstructs high tones and low tones for Proto-Prinmi.

== Documentation ==
Transcribed, translated and annotated audio documents in the Pumi language are available from the Pangloss Collection. They concern Northern dialects of Pumi.

== Phonology ==
Pumi Consonants
		Labial	Dental	Retroflex	Palatal	Velar
Nasal	voiceless	[m̥]	[n̥]			[ŋ̊]
Nasal	voiced	[m]	[n]			[ŋ]
Plosive	voiceless	[p]	[t]	[ʈ]		[k]
Plosive	aspirated	[pʰ]	[tʰ]	[ʈʰ]		[kʰ]
Plosive	voiced	[b]	[d]	[ɖ]		[ɡ]
Affricate	voiceless		[ts]	[ʈʂ]	[tɕ]	
Affricate	aspirated		[tsʰ]	[ʈʂʰ]	[tɕʰ]	
Affricate	voiced		[dz]	[ɖʐ]	[dʑ]	
Fricative	voiceless		[s]	[ʂ]	[ɕ]	[x]
Fricative	voiced		[z]	[ʐ]	[ʑ]	[ɣ]
Lateral	voiceless		[ɬ]			
Lateral	voiced		[l]			
Approximant	voiceless		[ɹ̥]			
Approximant	voiced	[w]	[ɹ]		[j]	

Oral Vowels of Pumi
	Front	Central		Back	
Close	[i/iᵊ]	[ɨ]	[ʉ]	[u]	
Close-Mid	[e]			[ɤ]	[o]
Mid		[ə]			
Open-Mid	[ɛ]	[ɜ]			
Near-Open		[ɐ]			
Open	[a]			[ɑ]	

Nasal Vowels of Pumi
	Front	Central	Back
Close	[ĩ]		
Close-Mid			[õ]
Mid		[ə̃]	
Open-Mid	[ɛ̃]		
Near-Open		[ɐ̃]	

== Orthography ==
The pinyin-based Roman script for Pumi has been proposed, but yet to be promoted.

Initials:
Letter	IPA	Letter	IPA	Letter	IPA	Letter	IPA	Letter	IPA
b	[p]	p	[pʰ]	bb	[b]	m	[m]	hm	[m̥]
d	[t]	t	[tʰ]	dd	[d]	n	[n]	hn	[n̥]
g	[k]	k	[kʰ]	gg	[ɡ]	h	[x]	hh	[ɣ]
j	[tɕ]	q	[tɕʰ]	jj	[dʑ]	x	[ɕ]	xx	[ʑ]
z	[ts]	c	[tsʰ]	zz	[dz]	s	[s]	ss	[z]
zh	[ʈʂ]	ch	[ʈʂʰ]	zzh	[ɖʐ]	sh	[ʂ]	ssh	[ʐ]
zr	[ʈ], [ʈʂ/kʴ]	cr	[ʈʰ], [ʈʂʰ/kʴʰ]	zzr	[ɖ], [ɖʐ/ɡʴ]	l	[l]	lh	[ɬ]
br	pʴ	pr	pʴʰ	bbr	bʴ	r	[ɹ]	hr	[ɹ̥]
ng	[ŋ]	hng	[ŋ̊]	w	[w]	y	[j]		

Rimes:
Letter	IPA	Letter	IPA	Letter	IPA	Letter	IPA
i	[i/iᵊ]	u	[u]	ui	[ɥi/wi]	e	[ə]
ie	[jɛ/e]	iu	[ju]	uee	[ɥe/we]		
ii	[ɨ/ə]	uu	[uə/ʉ]	ue	[ɥɛ/wɛ/wə]	üa	[ɥɐ]
in	[ĩ/ə̃]	ien	[(j)ɛ̃/ĩ]	uen	[ɥɛ̃/wɛ̃/wĩ]	uin	[ɥĩ]
o	[o/ɤ]	io	[(j)ɐw/ɨɤ]	on	[õ]	ion	[jõ]
a	[ɑ]	ia	[jɐ/jɜ]	ua	[wɑ/wɜ]	uan	[wɐ̃/wɜ̃]
aa	[a]			uaa	[wa]	an	[ɐ̃]
ea	[ɜ/ɛ]	ai	[ɜj]	uai	[wɜj]		

Tones:

- Monosyllabic words
  - f – falling tone
  - v – high tone
  - none – rising tone
- Polysyllable words
  - f – nonspreading of the high tone
  - v – spreading of the high tone to the next syllable
  - r – rising tone
  - none – default low tone

== Grammar ==
A reference grammar of the Wadu dialect of Pumi is available online. A grammar of Central Pumi is also available.

== Example ==
Pumi	English
Tèr gwéjè dzwán thèr phxèungphxàr sì. Timitae llìnggwe zreungzrun stìng.	He has broken several hammers. This man is crying and shouting all the time.

== Bibliography ==
- Ding, Sizhi (1998). Fundamentals of Prinmi (Pumi): A Tibeto-Burman Language of Northwestern Yunnan, China (Ph.D. thesis). Australian National University. doi:10.25911/5D77885FBC7F9. hdl:1885/109290.
- Daudey, Henriëtte (2014). A Grammar of Wadu Pumi (Ph.D. thesis). La Trobe University. hdl:1959.9/517239.
- Ding, Picus (2014). A Grammar of Prinmi: Based on the Central Dialect of Northwest Yunnan, China. Languages of the Greater Himalayan Region 14. Leiden: Brill. ISBN 9789004279773.
- Jacques, Guillaume (2011a). "A Panchronic Study of Aspirated Fricatives with New Evidence from Pumi". Lingua. 121 (9): 1518–1538. doi:10.1016/j.lingua.2011.04.003. S2CID 56166344.
- Jacques, Guillaume (2011b). "Tonal Alternations in the Pumi Verbal System" (PDF). Language and Linguistics. 12 (2): 359–392.
- Lu, Shaozun 陆绍尊 (2001). Pŭmĭyŭ fāngyán yánjiū 普米语方言硏究 [A Dialectal Study of the Pŭmĭ Language] (in Chinese). Beijing: Minzu chubanshe.
- Jiǎng, Yǐng [蒋颖] (2019). Yúnnán Lánpíng Pǔmǐyǔ [云南兰坪普米语]. Beijing: Commercial Press [商务印书馆].
