= Zhaba language =

Qiangic language of Sichuan, China

Zhaba
- [dʐa35 ʂka55]
- Native to: China
- Native speakers: 7,800 (2008)
- Language family: Sino-Tibetan: Tibeto-Burman; Qiangic; Zhaba–Queyu; Zhaba

Language codes
- ISO 639-3: zhb
- Glottolog: zhab1238
- ELP: Zhaba
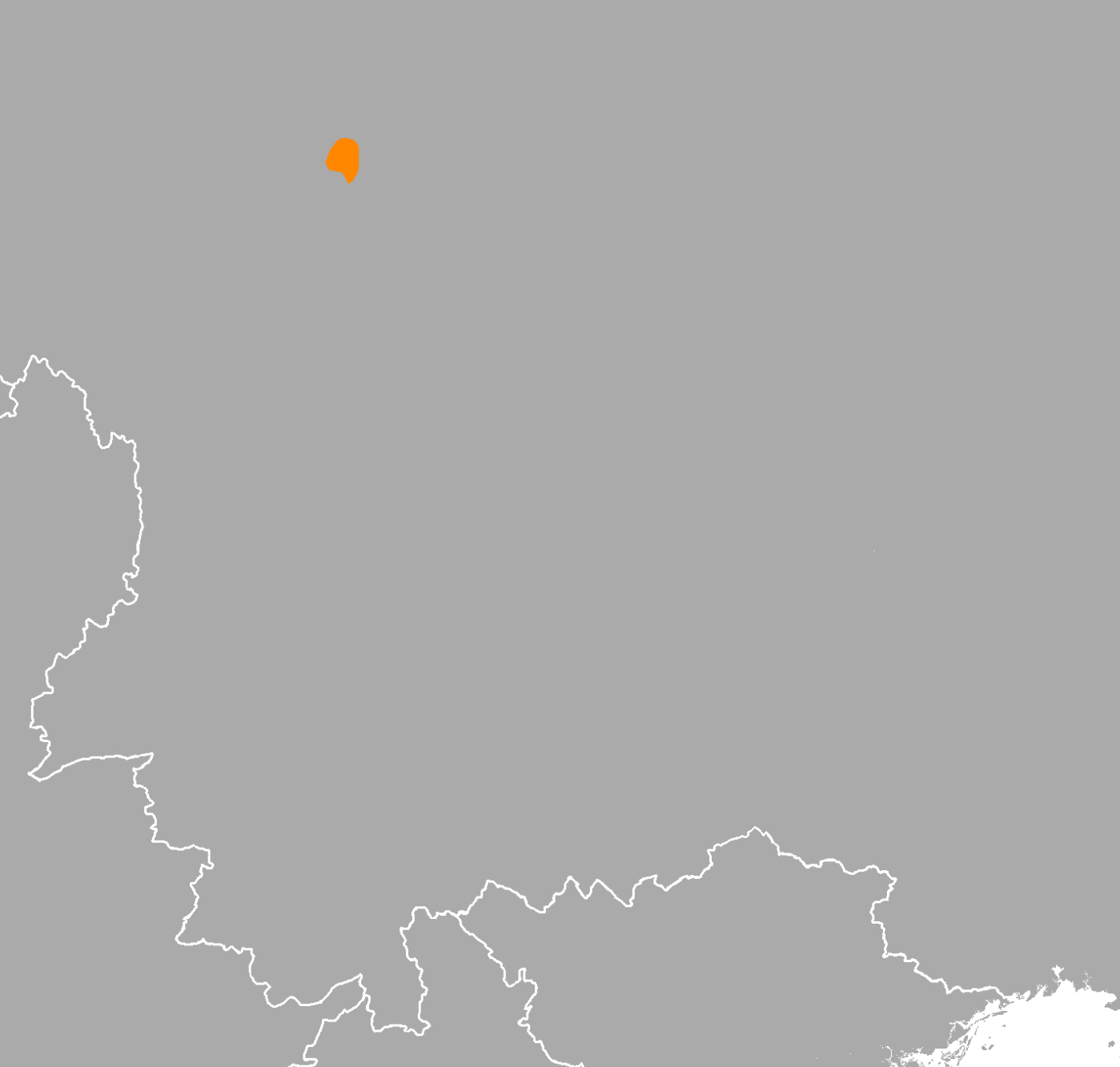

- Zhaba is classified as Vulnerable by the UNESCO Atlas of the World's Languages in Danger

Zhaba, also known as Bazi, Bozi, Draba, nDrapa, Zaba, Zha (Chinese: 扎坝语 or 扎巴语), is a Qiangic language of Sichuan, China spoken by about 8,000 people in Daofu County and Yajiang County. The Zhaba, who are officially classified by the Chinese government as ethnic Tibetan people, refer to themselves as [ndʐa55 pɪ31] and to the Zhaba language as [ndʐa35 ʂka55]. Neighboring Khams Tibetan speakers refer to the Zhaba people as [ndʐa55 pa55]. Zhaba speakers live primarily in the Xianshui River 鲜水河 valley.

Descriptions of Zhaba include Huang (1991) and Gong (2007). Huang & Dai (1992) document the Queyu dialect spoken in Zhatuo Village 扎拖村, Zhatuo Township 扎拖乡, Daofu County, Sichuan.

== Phonology ==
Zhaba consonants
		Labial		Alveolar		(Alveolo-)palatal	Retroflex	Velar	Uvular	Glottal
		plain	appr.	plain	sibilant	(Alveolo-)palatal	Retroflex	Velar	Uvular	Glottal
Nasal	voiced	m		n		ɲ		ŋ		
Nasal	voiceless	m̥		n̥		ɲ̥		ŋ̊		
Plosive	voiceless	p	pʳ	t	ts	tɕ	ʈʂ	k	q	
Plosive	aspirated	pʰ	pʰʳ	tʰ	tsʰ	tɕʰ	ʈʂʰ	kʰ	qʰ	
Plosive	voiced	b	bʳ	d	dz	dʑ	ɖʐ	ɡ		
Plosive	prenasalized	ᵐb		ⁿd	ⁿdz	ᶮdʑ	ᶯɖʐ	ᵑɡ		
Fricative	voiceless	(f)		ɬ	s	ɕ	ʂ	x		h
Fricative	voiced				z	ʑ	ʐ	ɣ		ɦ
Approximant		w		l		j				
Trill				r						

- /f/ is found only in Chinese loans.
- /l/ and /ɬ/ contrast only in Tibetan loans.
- /ʐ/ and /r/ may interchange word-initially; but they are contrastive when occurring in the second syllable of words.

Vowels
	Front		Central	Back
	Unrounded	Rounded	Central	Back
High	i ĩ	y ỹ	ɯ	u ũ
Mid	e ẽ	ø ø̃	ə ə̃	o õ
Low	ɛ ɛ̃		ɐ	a ã

Additionally, the following diphthongs and triphthongs have been observed: /ui/, /ue/, /uɛ/, /uɛ̃/, /yɛ/, /uɐ/, /ua/, /ei/, /ɛi/, /əu/, /ai/, /au/, /uei/, /iau/.

Zhaba also has four tones:

- [ ˥ ] - high, level
- [ ˥˧ ] - high-falling
- [ ˧˥ ] - high-rising
- [ ˧ ] - mid, level

== Dialects ==
Ethnologue (21st edition) lists two dialects of Zhaba:

- Drate (Northern nDrapa)
- Drame (Southern nDrapa, Zhami)

== Distribution ==
A total of 8,319 Zhaba people are distributed in the following townships of Zhaba District 扎坝区 of Daofu County (Upper Zha 上扎 area), and Zhamai District 扎麦区 of Yajiang County (Lower Zha 下扎 area) (Gong 2007:2-3). Zhaba people from the two districts speak the same mutually intelligible language.

- Zhaba District 扎坝区, Daofu County (Upper Zha 上扎 area)
  - Yazhuo 亚卓乡 (Zhaba name: vʑa55 ʂtsʰu31): 1,501 Zhaba people
  - Hongding 红顶乡 (Zhaba name: ŋui31 dɪ55): 752 Zhaba people
  - Zhongni 仲尼乡 (Zhaba name: tʂyi55 ȵi55): 970 Zhaba people
  - Zhatuo 扎拖乡 (Zhaba name: ndʐa31 gʊ55): 1,114 Zhaba people
  - Xiatuo 下拖乡 (Zhaba name: ptse55 tʰʊ31): 899 Zhaba people
- Zhamai District 扎麦区, Yajiang County (Lower Zha 下扎 area)
  - Waduo 瓦多乡 (Zhaba name: ve55 tʊ55): 1,536 Zhaba people
  - Murong 木绒乡 (Zhaba name: mə55 vzu31): 1,547 Zhaba people
