= Ngochang language =

Ngochang language may refer to:

- Ngochang or Achang language
- nGochang or Guiqiong language (Tibetan transliteration)
