= GQI =

GQI, Gqi, or gqi may refer to:

- Grinding quality index, software-based template used with railgrinders
- gqi, ISO 639-3 code for Guiqiong language
- Gqi, 2016 single by Okmalumkoolkat
