= Choyo language =

Qiangic language spoken in China and Tibet

Choyo
- Queyu, Choyu
- Native to: China
- Native speakers: (7,000 cited 1995)
- Language family: Sino-Tibetan: Tibeto-Burman; Qiangic; Zhaba–Queyu; Choyo

Language codes
- ISO 639-3: qvy
- Glottolog: quey1238
- ELP: Queyu
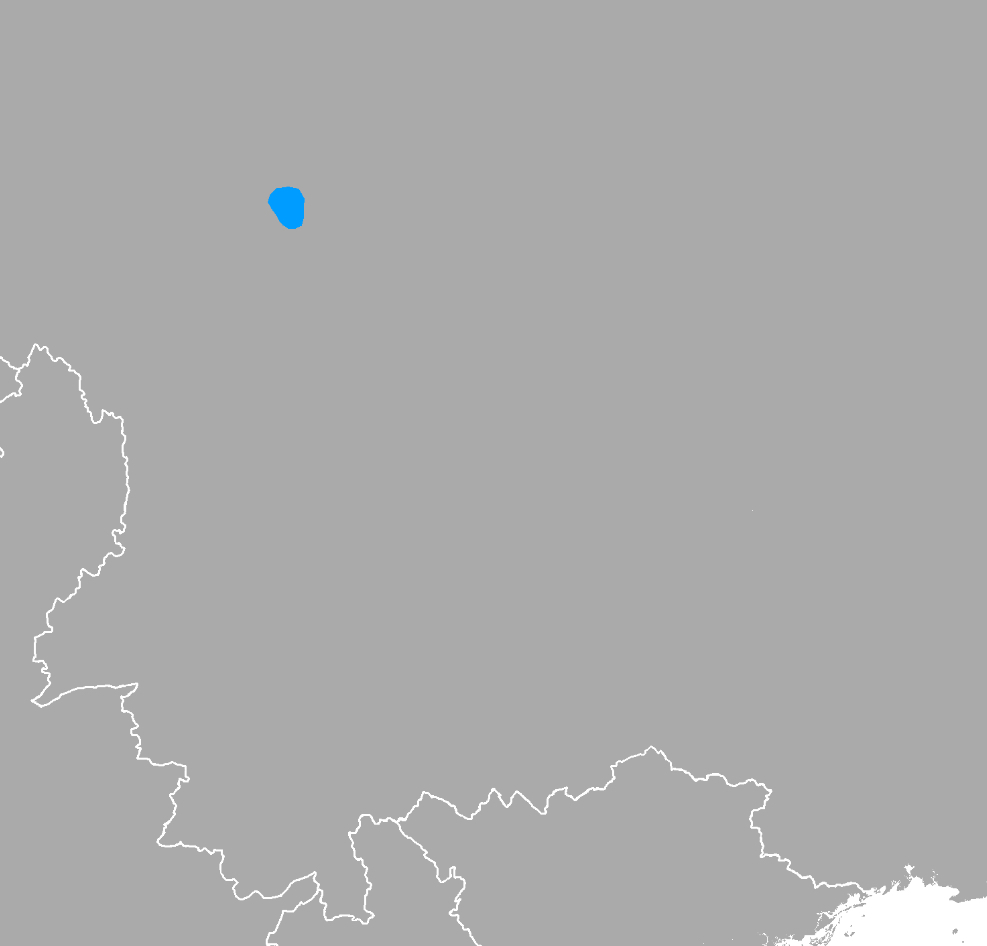

Queyu (Choyo, Choyu) is a Qiangic language of Yajiang County and Xinlong County, Sichuan. It is similar to and shares a name with Zhaba, but the two languages are distinct from each other.

== Dialects ==
The four dialects of Choyo are those of:

- Youlaxi Township 尤拉西乡, Xinlong County (Wang 1991; Huang ed. 1992) (which also has Western Horpa speakers)
- Rongba Township 绒坝乡, Litang County (Nishida 2008)
- Tuanjie Township 团结乡, Yajiang County (Lu 1985; Sun ed. 1991)
- Xiala Township 呷拉乡, Yajiang County (Prins & Nagano 2013) (which also has Dao speakers)

Suzuki & Wangmo (2016) consider the Lhagang Choyu language to be similar to but not part of Choyu proper, which consists of the four dialects listed above.

Huang & Dai (1992) document the Queyu dialect spoken in Youlaxi Township 尤拉西乡, Xinlong County, Ganzi Prefecture, Sichuan.

== Lhagang Choyu ==
Lhagang Choyu (Chinese: Tagong Queyu 塔公却域語) is a Qiangic language similar to Choyu recently described by Suzuki & Wangmo (2018). It is spoken in Tage [Thabs-mkhas] Hamlet, southwestern Tagong [lHa-sgang] Town, Kangding [Dar-mdo] Municipality, Sichuan Province, China. It used to be spoken in Xiya 西雅 Hamlet of the same township (Suzuki & Wangmo 2016:63). Lhagang Choyu is an endangered language with about 100 speakers.

== Phonology ==
Consonants
		Labial	Alveolar	Retroflex	Palatal	Velar
Plosive	oral	p b	t d			k g
Plosive	aspirated	pʰ	tʰ			kʰ
Affricate	oral		ts dz	ʈʂ ɖʐ	tʃ dʒ	
Affricate	aspirated		tsʰ	ʈʂʰ	tʃʰ	
Fricative	oral	(f) v	s z	ʂ ʐ	ʃ ʒ	x ɣ
Fricative	aspirated		sʰ	ʂʰ	ʃʰ	
Nasal		m̥ m	n̥ n			(ŋ̊) ŋ
Approximant		w	l̥ l	r̥ r	j	

- /f/ and /ŋ̊/ are only observed in one word each.

Vowels
	Front	Central	Back
High	i		u
Mid-high	e eˤ	ɘ	o oˤ
Mid-low		ə əˤ	
Low	ɛ	ɜ ɜˤ	aˤ

Choyo also has three tones; high, low, and rising.
