= Shixing language =

Sino-Tibetan language of southwest China

Shixing
- Shuhi
- Native to: China
- Native speakers: (1,800 cited 2000)
- Language family: Sino-Tibetan: Tibeto-Burman; Loloish or Qiangic (?); Naic; Shixing

Language codes
- ISO 639-3: sxg
- Glottolog: shix1238
- ELP: Shixing

Shixing (Chinese: 史興語; pinyin: Shǐxìngyǔ), also rendered Shuhi, is a Qiangic language of Sichuan, China. Two-thirds of its speakers are monolingual.

Shixing is also known by its Tibetan name Xumi (旭米; Xùmǐ); it is spoken by about 1800 people living by the Shuiluo River 水洛 in Shuiluo Township 水洛乡, Mili Tibetan Autonomous County.

Katia Chirkova reports two varieties.

- Upper Xumi (autonym: ʂuhĩ)
- Lower Xumi (autonym: ʃʉhẽ)

== Phonology ==
=== Consonants ===
Xumi features a very unusual phonemic contrast between voiceless /ʎ̥/ and voiced /ʎ/ alveolo-palatal lateral approximants and voiceless and voiced glottal fricatives.

Consonant phonemes
		Labial	Alveolar		Postalveolar			Velar	Uvular	Glottal
		Labial	plain	sibilant	Palato- alveolar	Retroflex	Alveolo- palatal	Velar	Uvular	Glottal
Nasal	voiceless	m̥	n̥				ɲ̊^{2}	ŋ̊^{2}		
Nasal	voiced	m	n				ɲ	ŋ		
Plosive/ Affricate	aspirated	pʰ	tʰ	tsʰ	tʃʰ^{2}	ʈʂʰ	tɕʰ	kʰ	qʰ^{2}	
Plosive/ Affricate	plain	p	t	ts	tʃ^{2}	ʈʂ	tɕ	k	q^{2}	
Plosive/ Affricate	voiced	b	d	dz	dʒ^{2}	ɖʐ	dʑ	ɡ	ɢ^{2}	
Fricative	voiceless			s	ʃ^{2}	ʂ^{1}	ɕ	x^{2}	χ^{1}	h
Fricative	voiced			z	ʒ^{2}	ʐ^{1}	ʑ	ɣ^{2}	ʁ^{1}	ɦ
Lateral	voiceless		l̥				ʎ̥			
Lateral	voiced		l				ʎ			
Approximant			ɹ				j	w		

1. Only in Upper Xumi
2. Only in Lower Xumi

=== Vowels ===
Oral monophthongs of Lower Xumi, from Chirkova & Chen (2013:369)

==== Oral ====
- The close and close-mid series are the same in both varieties: /i, ʉ, u, e, o/. The difference lies in the open-mid and open series; in Upper Xumi, these are /ɛ, ɐ, ɔ, a/, whereas in Lower Xumi, they are /ɛ, ɐ, ɑ/.
  - At least in Lower Xumi /ʉ/, is phonetically close-mid [ɵ].
  - /ɐ/ is closer in Upper Xumi [ɜ]; in addition, the open central vowel /a/ is phonetically near-open [ɐ]. For this reason, they may be transcribed with ⟨ɜ⟩ and ⟨ɐ⟩, respectively.
  - The Lower Xumi /o/ and /ɑ/ generally correspond to Upper Xumi /u/ and /ɔ/, respectively. /ɑ/ is near-open near-back [ɑ̽] and thus similar to the Upper Xumi /a/, but more back.

==== Nasal ====
- Upper Xumi has the following nasal vowels: /ĩ, ũ, ɛ̃, ɔ̃, ɐ̃/, as well as the marginal /ɘ̃/, which occurs only in the word [^{LP}mɘ̃da] 'on the roof / upstairs'.
- Lower Xumi has the following nasal vowels: /ĩ, õ, ɛ̃, ɐ̃, ɑ̃/, as well as the marginal /ə̃/, which occurs only in the word [^{LP}mə̃dɐ ᴿʁo] 'on the roof / upstairs'. /ẽ, õ, ɐ̃, ɑ̃/ generally correspond to Upper Xumi /ĩ, ũ, ɛ̃, ɔ̃/, respectively.

== Bibliography ==
- Chirkova, Katia; Chen, Yiya (2013), "Xumi, Part 1: Lower Xumi, the Variety of the Lower and Middle Reaches of the Shuiluo River", Journal of the International Phonetic Association, 43 (3): 363–379, doi:10.1017/S0025100313000157
- Chirkova, Katia; Chen, Yiya; Kocjančič Antolík, Tanja (2013), "Xumi, Part 2: Upper Xumi, the Variety of the Upper Reaches of the Shuiluo River", Journal of the International Phonetic Association, 43 (3): 381–396, doi:10.1017/S0025100313000169
- Sun Hongkai [孙宏开]. 2014. A study of Shixing [Shixingyu yanjiu 史兴语研究]. Beijing: Minzu University Press.
