= Alveolo-palatal affricate =

Alveolo-palatal affricate may refer to the following two consonants:

- Voiced alveolo-palatal affricate
- Voiceless alveolo-palatal affricate
