= Guiqiong language =

Qiangic language of Sichuan and Tibet

Guiqiong
- Duampu
- Native to: China
- Native speakers: (6,000 cited 2000)
- Language family: Sino-Tibetan: Tibeto-Burman; Qiangic; Guiqiong

Language codes
- ISO 639-3: gqi
- Glottolog: guiq1238
- ELP: Guiqiong
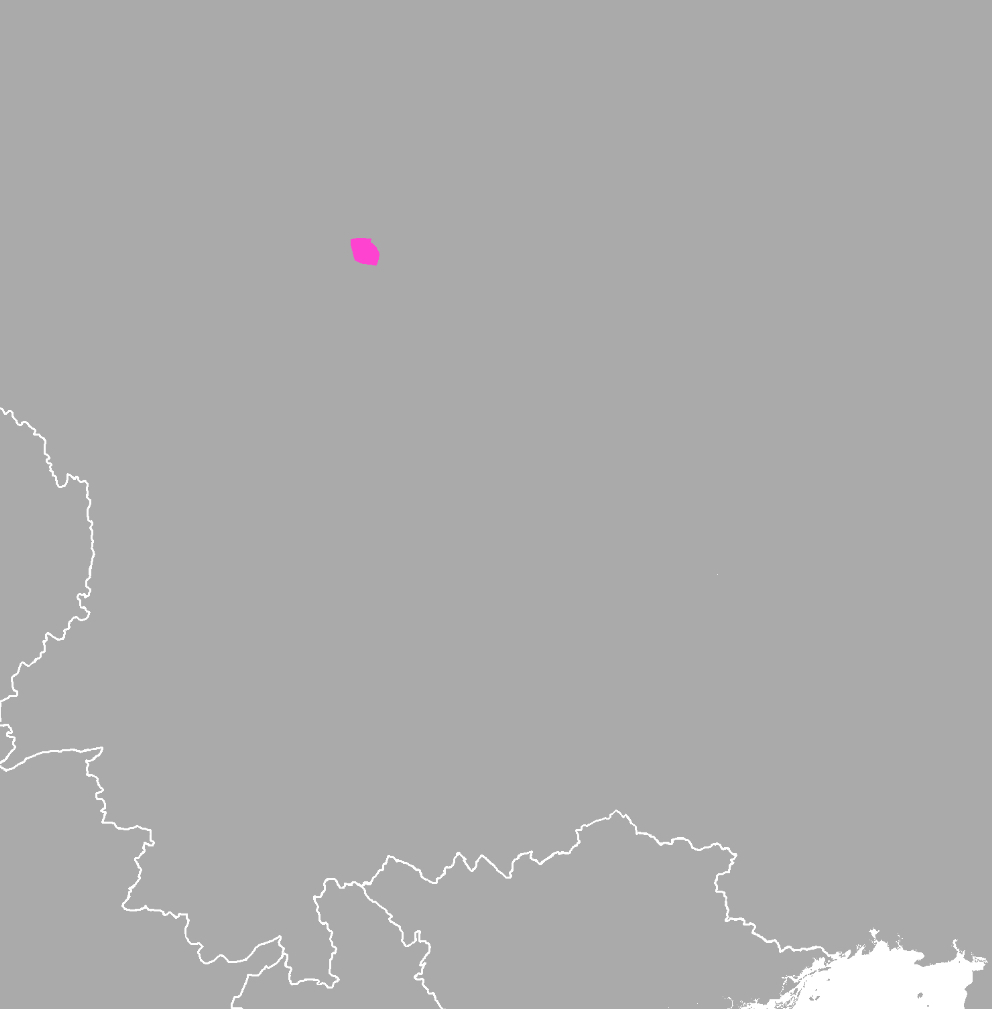

- Guichong is classified as Vulnerable by the UNESCO Atlas of the World's Languages in Danger

Guiqiong (autonym: ɡuʨhiɐŋ; simplified Chinese: 贵琼; traditional Chinese: 貴瓊; pinyin: Guìqióng) is a Qiangic language of Sichuan, China. There are differences in the phonology of the dialects, but communication is possible. Two or three varieties have low mutual intelligibility with the rest.

It may be the same language as Sötati-pö in early editions of Ethnologue.

Sun (1991) documents Guiqiong of Maiben Township 麦本乡, Yutong District 鱼通区, Kangding County 康定县, Sichuan (Sun 1991:227).

The Qiangic languages are split into two language clusters. Guiqiong is categorized into a specific Qiangic cluster based on its vocabulary. This Qiangic language cluster also includes Zhaba, Queya, Ersu, Shixing, and Namuzi.

Outside their villages, speakers communicate utilizing the Chinese language. Guiqiong is heavily influenced by the Chinese language, as it contains many loanwords.

The Guiqiong language utilizes four tones and has no written script. Although Guiqiong lacks a written script, it has been able to successfully transcend from generation to generally orally.

The language has no presence in media today.

== General information ==
=== Population of speakers ===
The population of speakers of this language for a long time have only been estimates. It has been difficult to provide an accurate count of how many exist because since the People's Republic of China was founded, the government has considered the Guiqiong people to be a part of the Tibetan minority. Because of this, the national census cannot provide an official count of the Guiqiong people.

=== Location ===
The general location of Guiqiong speakers is confined to a very small rectangular area. This area stretches 20 kilometers from its northern boundary to the southern boundary, and just reaches about 1 kilometer from its eastern to its western boundary. The area is situated to the west of the well-known Sichuan Province in China.

Jiang (2015: 2) reports that Guiqiong is spoken in the townships of Maibeng, Shelian, Qianxi, Guzan, Lan'an, and Pengba. Jiang's (2015) data is mostly from Guzan Township.

Most groups who speak languages that are part of the Qiangic subgroup of Tibeto-Burman are classified as members of the Tibetan national minority and live in western Sichuan province. Speakers of Guiqiong live in small communities that are intertwined among larger Chinese communities. They are distributed along the terraces of the Dadu River Yuton District, Kangding County of the Ganzi Autonomous Prefecture of the Tibetan Nationality, Sichuan.

=== Name of the language ===
Guiqiong is known by many different names, some that the Guiqiong people use to refer to themselves and their language, and some that others use to refer to the Guiqiong people and their language.

The Guiqiong people refer to themselves as /ɡuʨhiɐŋ/. It is believed that Chinese names such as 貴瓊 (guiqiong) are transliterations of /ɡuʨhiɐŋ/.

== Phonology ==
- Older speakers retain the distinction between the alveolo-palatal and retroflex series; younger speakers do not.
- Older speakers retain the distinction between the velar and uvular series; younger speakers have both series in free variation.
- The zero-initial is realized as [÷].
- In clusters,
  - The language has a very complex initial consonant system.
- The following table is the phonological consonant inventory of Guiqiong.

Consonant initials of Guiqiong
		Labial	Alveolar		Post-alv.	Retroflex	(Alveolo-) Palatal	Velar	Uvular
		Labial	plain	sibilant	Post-alv.	Retroflex	(Alveolo-) Palatal	Velar	Uvular
Nasal		m	n			ɳ	ɲ		
Stop/ Affricate	voiceless	p	t	t͡s	t͡ʃ	t͡ʂ	t͡ɕ	k	q
Stop/ Affricate	aspirated	pʰ	tʰ	t͡sʰ	t͡ʃʰ	t͡ʂʰ	t͡ɕʰ	kʰ	qʰ
Stop/ Affricate	voiced	b	d	d͡z	d͡ʒ	d͡ʐ	d͡ʑ	ɡ	
Fricative	voiceless	f	ɬ	s	ʃ	ʂ	ɕ	x	
Fricative	voiced	v		z	ʒ	ʐ	ʑ	ɣ	
Sonorant		w	l				j		

Initial Clusters
mp	nt	nts	ntʂ	ntʃ	ntɕ	ŋk
mpʰ	ntʰ	ntsʰ	ntʂʰ	ntʃʰ	ntɕʰ	ŋkʰ
mb	nd	ndz	ndʐ	ndʒ	ndʑ	ŋɡ

== Vowels ==
Guiqiong distinguishes eight different vowel qualities.

	Front	Central	Back
Close	i y		u
Close-mid			o
Mid		ə	
Open-mid	ɛ		ɔ
Near-open		ɐ	

Nasalization and diphthongs are also used to distinguish words.

== See also ==
- Guiqiong word list (Wiktionary)
