= Pumi people =

Ethnic group native to China

Pumi
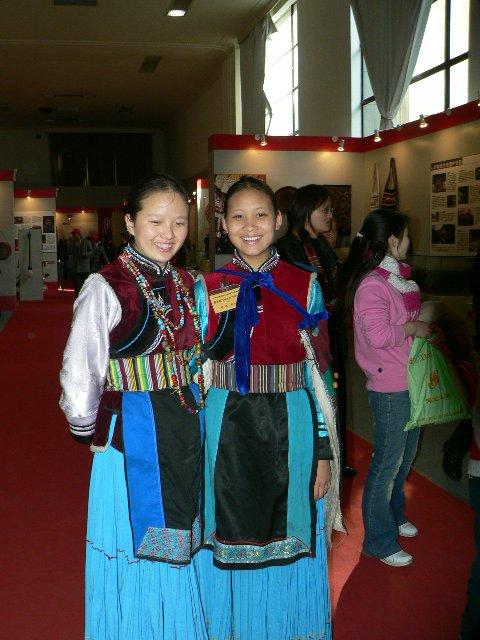
- Alternative names: P'umi, Primi, Pimi, Prummi

Total population
- 45,012

Regions with significant populations
- China – Yunnan: 45,012

Languages
- Pumi

Religion
- Bon, Tibetan Buddhism, Dingba

Related ethnic groups
- Tibetan (mainly those living in Mili, Sichuan)

The Pumi (also Primi or Premi) people (Tibetan: བོད་མི་, Wylie: bod mi, Chinese: 普米族; pinyin: Pǔmǐzú, autonym: /pʰʐə̃˥.mi˥/) are an ethnic group. They form one of the 56 ethnic groups officially recognized by China.

Ethnically related to the Tibetans of the Mili Tibetan Autonomous County and Yanyuan County in Sichuan, the Pumi are recognized as an official minority nationality unique to Yunnan, with a population of 30,000. Communities are found notably in Lanping Bai and Pumi Autonomous County, Ninglang Yi Autonomous County, Lijiang Old Town, Yulong Naxi Autonomous County, Weixi Lisu Autonomous County and Yongsheng County, typically at elevations above 9,000 feet (2,700 m).

== Language ==
Prinmi, the Pumi language, belongs to the Qiangic branch of the Tibeto-Burman family. In the past, it was noted that the Pumi in the Muli and Ninglang areas used the Tibetan script mainly for religious purposes, although gradually the Tibetan script fell into disuse and oblivion. In modern times, the Pumi receive education in Chinese. A pinyin-based Roman script has been proposed, but the orthography has yet to be promoted.

== History ==
The Pumi have a long history and their path of migration is historically traceable. Originally, they lived as nomads inhabiting the Qinghai-Tibetan plateau. Later, they moved to the warmer areas along valleys within the Hengduan Mountain Range in the 4th century B.C. Their ancestors probably are the ancient Qiang people, a nomadic tribe on the Qinghai-Tibet Plateau.

Subsequently, they moved to Northern Sichuan in the 7th century, and subsequently to northwest Yunnan in the 14th century. Many of them settled down to become farmers, and local landlords dominated the Pumi economy in Lanping and Lijiang counties. Except for a small number of common areas, the landlords held large areas of lands and collected rental fees from the peasants. This accounted for at least 50 per cent of the harvest. Pumi landlords and Nakhi chiefs also traded domestic slaves.

With the coming of the Cultural Revolution, the landlords' powers were severely weakened. The coming of modern facilities and technologies, such as hospitals and factories, have also greatly changed the lifestyle of the Pumi.

In Muli, Pumi language speakers are classified as Tibetan. Its political elites were mostly Buddhist monks of Pumi origins, while many lower-class speakers consider the Pumi to be a single people that are not Tibetan.

== Religion ==
Due to their contact with Tibetans, the religion of the Pumi has been heavily influenced by Tibetan Buddhism and the older practice of Bön. Today, this amalgamation is known as Hangui (韩规) and shares much in common with the Dongba practices of the Nakhi people and Daba practices of the Mosuo. A form of ancestor worship is also present among the Pumi.

Through the efforts of Tibetan Buddhist missionaries from Tibet, a significant proportion have adopted the Gelugpa and Kagyu lineage of Tibetan Buddhism, much of whom are those in Sichuan.

The Zanbala religion, also locally known as Dingba, literally means white earth. It is noted that the Pumi around Ninglang still install Zanbala altars in their home, which were worshipped by the older generations. The Zanbala religion consists of the veneration of three gods and ancestral spirits, in which only the old men preside over the rituals and prayers.

Almost all Pumi villages have their own local mountain gods, which are worshipped during festive seasons. On those days, the entire family will give food offerings and pray for the good health and prosperity of the family. On the 15th day of each month, the minor mountain god is worshipped, and a grand ceremony is held on the 15th day of the 7th lunar month to venerate the Great Mountain God.

In many of the Pumi homes, a cooking fire ring plays an important part of Pumi beliefs. The ring should never be touched by guests. A Guazei, which consists of small stone towers, is located behind the fire rings. During mealtime, the oldest male will take a spoonful of the food, which will subsequently be placed on every tower. One spoonful will be thrown into the fire, which acts as a symbolic gesture to feed the spirits of their ancestors.

== Culture ==
Because of their origins, the Pumi are culturally influenced by the Tibetans. The Lunar New Year is also celebrated on the first fifteen days of the new year based on the lunar calendar. Losar is also celebrated by some as well.

Especially in Ninglang and Yongsheng, Pumi women often wear jackets with buttons down one side. Long and pleated skirts, multi-colored wide belts are worn. Owing to its cold weather, a goatskin is draped over their backs. However, in the case of the Lanping and Weixi areas, the womenfolk tend to wear colored long-sleeved jackets under their vests, along with long trousers which are fastened with embroidered belts. Like the Tibetans, Pumi women plait their hair with yak tail hairs and silk threads. Subsequently, their heads are wrapped in large cloths. Prized jewellery, such as silver earrings and bracelets are worn among the rich as well.

Pumi men tend to wear either sleeveless goatskin or linen jackets with and long trousers, which is accompanied by the Tibetan hat. Especially in the case of the hunters and warriors, a long Tibetan sword and deerskin bags may be carried. Upon reaching thirteen, the Pumi boys will go through the ablution rites of manhood and only after ablution may they put on adult clothing and take part in society's activities.

== Lifestyle ==
Owing to its cold weather and its close proximity to Tibet, the lifestyle of Prinmi-speaking Tibetans closely resembles to that of the Tibetans. On the other hand, the Pumi living in Yunnan have adopted a lifestyle similar to that of Han Chinese. For instance, rice has become the staple food for most Pumi. Even in villages where the climate is too cold to grow the crop, many will trade potatoes for rice at the market place. A variety of vegetables and fruits such as the Chinese cabbage, beans, eggplant and melons serve as supplements.

Generally, the Pumi are a patrilineal and monogamous society, although polygamy is accepted in places like Yongning in northern Ninglang. Alongside the Mosuo, the Pumi here adopt a matriarchal system linked to the Azhu system, which literally means friendship, and families are formed by virtue of consanguinity instead of marriage.

The traditional way to preserve pork is to remove all the inner organs and the feet of a large pig. Lean meat is made into sausages while the entire slaughtered pig is sewed up after salt is added inside the body. The sewed-up salty body wrapped in pork skin, large in the bottom and small in the head, resembles the shape of a pipa after it is dried up. It is thus known by the Chinese nickname of Pipa meat and the whole body can be preserved for years.

A traditional beer-like drink called pri is brewed by every Pumi family in villages. It is an essential drink at wedding ceremony and hence the word for 'to marry' is expressed as 'to drink pri' in Prinmi.
