= Jiulong County =

Jiulong County 九龙县 · བརྒྱད་ཟིལ་རྫོང་། · ꐳꇊꑤ Gyaisi, Gyézil, Njilop
- County
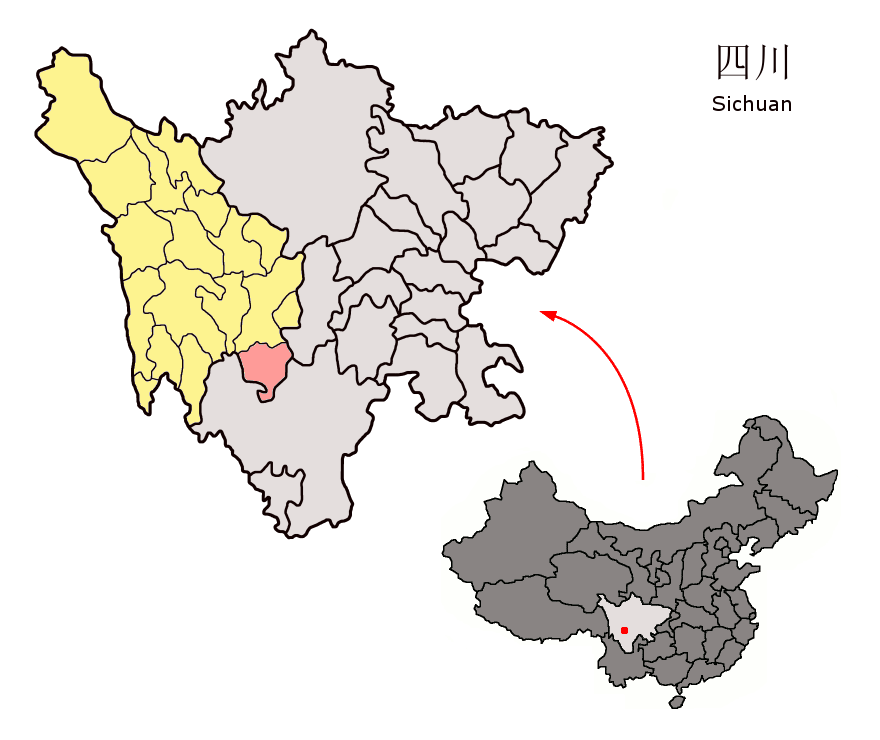
- Jiulong County (red) in Garzê Prefecture (yellow) and Sichuan

- Location of the seat in Sichuan Jiulong (China)
- Coordinates (Jiulong County government): 29°00′01″N 101°30′26″E
- Country: China
- Province: Sichuan
- Autonomous prefecture: Garzê
- County seat: Gor

Area
  - Total: 6,770 km^{2} (2,610 sq mi)

Population (2020)
  - Total: 53,738
  - Density: 7.94/km^{2} (20.6/sq mi)
- Website: www.scjl.gov.cn

Jiulong County

Chinese name
- Simplified Chinese: 九龙县
- Traditional Chinese: 九龍縣
Transcriptions
Standard Mandarin
- Hanyu Pinyin: Jiǔlóng Xiàn

Tibetan name
- Tibetan: བརྒྱད་ཟིལ་རྫོང་། / བརྒྱད་ཟུར་རྫོང་།
Transcriptions
- Wylie: brgyad zil rdzong / brgyad zur rdzong
- Tibetan Pinyin: Gyaisi Zong / Gyaisur Zong

Yi name
- Yi: ꐳꇊꑤ; Romanisation: nji lop xiep

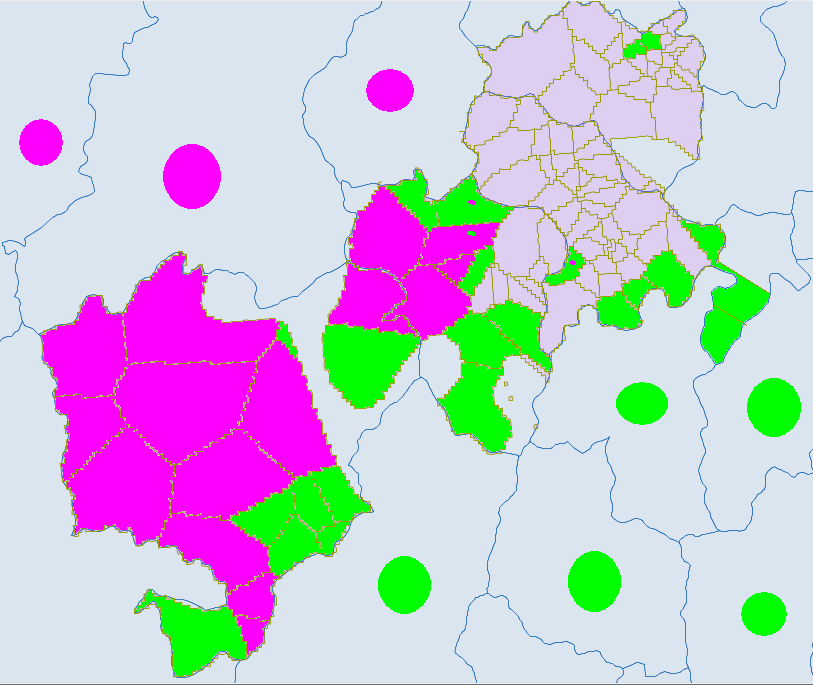
Light green -Yi. Red -Tibetan.

Gyaisi County (Tibetan: བརྒྱད་ཟིལ། / བརྒྱད་ཟུར།, Wylie: brgyad zil / brgyad zur), also Jiulong County (Chinese: 九龙县), is a county located in southeastern Garzê Tibetan Autonomous Prefecture, Sichuan province, China. It has a population of 52000, mainly Tibetans, Hans, and Yis.

== Administrative divisions ==
Gyaisi County contains 9 towns, 4 townships, and 3 ethnic townships:

Name	Simplified Chinese	Hanyu Pinyin	Tibetan	Wylie	Yi	Romanized Yi	Administrative division code
Towns
Gor Town (Ga'er)	呷尔镇	Gā'ěr Zhèn	སྒོར་གྲོང་རྡལ།	sgor grong rdal			513324100
Yandai Town (Yaindain)	烟袋镇	Yāndài Zhèn	ཡན་ཏན་ཀྲེན།	yan tan kren			513324101
Sayag Town (Sanya)	三垭镇	Sānyā Zhèn	ས་ཡག་གྲོང་རྡལ།	sa yag grong rdal			513324102
Qêwalung Town (Xuewalong)	雪洼龙镇	Xuěwālóng Zhèn	བྱེ་བ་ལུང་གྲོང་རྡལ།	bye ba lung grong rdal			513324103
Mukyü Town (Wanba)	湾坝镇	Wānbà Zhèn	མུ་ཁྱུད་གྲོང་རྡལ།	mu khyud grong rdal			513324104
Tanggo Town (Tanggu)	汤古镇	Tānggǔ Zhèn	ཐང་མགོ་གྲོང་རྡལ།	thang mgo grong rdal			513324105
Ulagqoin Town (Wulaxi)	乌拉溪镇	Wūlāxī Zhèn	འུ་ལག་བྱོན་གྲོང་རྡལ།	'u lag byon grong rdal			513324106
Kardo Town (Kuiduo)	魁多镇	Kuíduō Zhèn	འཁར་རྡོ་གྲོང་རྡལ།	'khar rdo grong rdal			513324107
Laqu Town (Naiqu)	乃渠镇	Nǎiqú Zhèn	ལ་ཆུ་གྲོང་རྡལ།	la chu grong rdal			513324108
Townships
Sangngagrong Township (Sanyanlong)	三岩龙乡	Sānyánlóng Xiāng	གསང་སྔགས་རོང་ཤང་།	gsang sngags rong shang			513324202
Sangtoin Township (Shangtuan)	上团乡	Shàngtuán Xiāng	སང་ཐོན་ཤང་།	sang thon shang			513324203
Baworong Township (Ba'obrong, Bawolung)	八窝龙乡	Bāwōlóng Xiāng	དཔའ་བོ་རོང་ཤང་།	dpa' bo rong shang			513324204
Hurba Township (Hongba)	洪坝乡	Hóngbà Xiāng	ཧུར་པ་ཤང་།	hur pa shang			513324216
Ethnic townships
Zylur Yi Ethnic Township (Zi'er)	子耳彝族乡	Zǐ'ěr Yízú Xiāng			ꊪꇓꆈꌠꑣ	zy lur nuo su xie	513324209
Xuoji Yi Ethnic Township (Xiaojin)	小金彝族乡	Xiǎojīn Yízú Xiāng			ꑦꏢꆈꌠꑣ	xuo ji nuo su xie	513324212
Dolop Yi Ethnic Township (Duoluo)	朵洛彝族乡	Duǒluò Yízú Xiāng			ꄏꇊꆈꌠꑣ	do lop nuo su xie	513324213

== Geography and climate ==
Due to its elevation, Jiulong County has a subtropical highland climate (Köppen Cwb), with strong monsoonal influences; winters are frosty and summers warm with frequent rain. The monthly 24-hour average temperature ranges from 1.6 °C (34.9 °F) in December and January to 15.3 °C (59.5 °F) in July, while the annual mean is 9.1 °C (48.4 °F). Over 75% of the annual precipitation of 922.5 mm (36.3 in) occurs from June through September. With monthly average percentage of sunny days ranging from 32% in July to 58% in January, the county seat receives 1,983 hours of bright sunshine annually. Diurnal temperature variation is large, averaging 14.2 °C (25.6 °F) annually.

Climate data for Jiulong, elevation 2,925 m (9,596 ft), (1991–2020 normals, extremes 1971–2010)
Month	Jan	Feb	Mar	Apr	May	Jun	Jul	Aug	Sep	Oct	Nov	Dec	Year
Record high °C (°F)	23.5 (74.3)	25.3 (77.5)	26.4 (79.5)	28.0 (82.4)	31.2 (88.2)	31.7 (89.1)	30.2 (86.4)	29.3 (84.7)	29.1 (84.4)	25.1 (77.2)	22.6 (72.7)	20.5 (68.9)	31.7 (89.1)
Mean daily maximum °C (°F)	12.2 (54.0)	14.2 (57.6)	16.9 (62.4)	19.5 (67.1)	21.4 (70.5)	21.9 (71.4)	21.8 (71.2)	21.7 (71.1)	20.0 (68.0)	17.9 (64.2)	15.0 (59.0)	12.4 (54.3)	17.9 (64.2)
Daily mean °C (°F)	1.8 (35.2)	4.2 (39.6)	7.2 (45.0)	10.0 (50.0)	13.1 (55.6)	15.0 (59.0)	15.4 (59.7)	15.2 (59.4)	13.7 (56.7)	10.4 (50.7)	5.4 (41.7)	2.0 (35.6)	9.5 (49.0)
Mean daily minimum °C (°F)	−5.5 (22.1)	−3.4 (25.9)	−0.3 (31.5)	2.9 (37.2)	7.1 (44.8)	10.7 (51.3)	11.7 (53.1)	11.4 (52.5)	10.0 (50.0)	5.9 (42.6)	−0.6 (30.9)	−4.7 (23.5)	3.8 (38.8)
Record low °C (°F)	−15.6 (3.9)	−13.1 (8.4)	−9.4 (15.1)	−5.6 (21.9)	−2.0 (28.4)	2.6 (36.7)	3.5 (38.3)	2.5 (36.5)	0.0 (32.0)	−4.8 (23.4)	−10.5 (13.1)	−14.4 (6.1)	−15.6 (3.9)
Average precipitation mm (inches)	2.8 (0.11)	4.3 (0.17)	20.3 (0.80)	42.3 (1.67)	86.7 (3.41)	203.4 (8.01)	190.0 (7.48)	150.7 (5.93)	149.5 (5.89)	51.2 (2.02)	12.0 (0.47)	2.1 (0.08)	915.3 (36.04)
Average precipitation days (≥ 0.1 mm)	2.2	3.1	8.5	13.2	18.0	24.4	25.3	23.3	22.9	12.5	4.9	1.9	160.2
Average snowy days	5.5	6.1	4.9	1.6	0.3	0	0	0	0.1	0.4	2.4	3.5	24.8
Average relative humidity (%)	43	41	46	54	62	75	79	78	78	72	61	51	62
Mean monthly sunshine hours	186.0	176.0	189.0	185.6	181.9	145.3	132.1	134.5	133.0	163.1	176.1	183.7	1,986.3
Percentage possible sunshine	57	55	51	48	43	35	31	33	36	46	55	58	46
Source 1: China Meteorological Administration
Source 2: Weather China
