= Voiced alveolo-palatal fricative =

Consonantal sound represented by ⟨ʑ⟩ in IPA

ʑ
- IPA number: 183

Audio sample
- source · help

Encoding
- Entity (decimal): &#657;
- Unicode (hex): U+0291
- X-SAMPA: z\
- Braille: ⠦ (braille pattern dots-236) ⠵ (braille pattern dots-1356)
Image

A voiced alveolo-palatal sibilant fricative is a type of consonantal sound, used in some spoken languages. The symbol in the International Phonetic Alphabet that represents this sound is ⟨ʑ⟩ (⟨z⟩, plus the curl also found in its voiceless counterpart ⟨ɕ⟩). It is the sibilant equivalent of the voiced palatal fricative.

== Features ==
Sagittal section of a voiced alveolo-palatal fricative

Features of a voiced alveolo-palatal fricative:

- Its manner of articulation is sibilant (a subclass of fricatives and affricates), which means it is generally produced with a higher-frequency turbulence. Sibilants may be articulated with various tongue shapes and degrees of palatalization, depending on their place of articulation.
- Its place of articulation is alveolo-palatal. This means that:
  - The articulation is postalveolar and laminal, meaning that the tongue blade contacts the roof of the mouth in the area behind the alveolar ridge (the gum line). Some phoneticians instead argue that the articulation is pre-palatal and dorsal, meaning that the back of the tongue (the dorsum) is raised toward the front of the hard palate.
  - It is heavily palatalized, meaning that the middle of the tongue is bowed and raised towards the hard palate.
- Its phonation is voiced, which means the vocal cords vibrate during the articulation.
- It is an oral consonant, which means that air is not allowed to escape through the nose.
- It is a median consonant, which means it is produced by directing the airstream down the midline of the tongue, rather than to the sides.
- Its airstream mechanism is pulmonic, which means it is articulated by pushing air only with the intercostal muscles and abdominal muscles, as in most speech sounds.

== Occurrence ==
Language		Word	IPA	Meaning	Notes
Abkhaz		ажьа	[aˈʑa]	'hare'	See Abkhaz phonology
Adyghe		жьау	[ʑaːw]	'shadow'	
Catalan	Many dialects	ajut	[əˈʑut̪]	'help' (n.)	See Catalan phonology
Catalan	Most dialects	peix blau	[ˈpe(j)ʑ‿ˈβɫɑw]	'blue fish'	Allophone of /(j)ʃ/ (phonetically [(j)ɕ]). See Catalan phonology
Chinese	Jiangshan	十	[ʑyœʔ]	'ten'	
Chinese	Taiwanese Hokkien	今仔日/kin-á-ji̍t	[kɪn˧a˥ʑɪt˥]	'today'	
Czech		život	[ʑɪvot]	'life'	See Czech phonology
English	Ghana	vision	[ˈviʑin]	'vision'	Educated speakers may use [ʒ], which this phoneme corresponds to in other dialects.
Japanese		火事/kaji	[kaʑi]	'fire'	Found in free variation with [d͡ʑ] between vowels. See Japanese phonology
Kabardian		жьэ	[ʑa]	'mouth'	
Lower Sorbian		źasety	[ʑäs̪ɛt̪ɨ]	'tenth'	
Luxembourgish		héijen	[ˈhɜ̝ɪ̯ʑən]	'high'	Allophone of /ʁ/ after phonologically front vowels; some speakers merge it with [ʒ]. Occurs in only a few words. See Luxembourgish phonology
Pa Na		[ʑu˧˥]		'small'	
Polish		źrebię	[ˈʑrɛbjɛ]	'foal'	Also denoted by the digraph ⟨zi⟩. See Polish phonology
Portuguese		magia	[maˈʑi.ɐ]	'magic'	Also described as palato-alveolar [ʒ]. See Portuguese phonology
Romani	Kalderash	ʒal	[ʑal]	'he/she/it goes'	Realized as [d͡ʒ] in conservative dialects.
Romanian	Transylvanian dialects	geană	[ˈʑanə]	'eyelash'	Realized as [d͡ʒ] in standard Romanian. See Romanian phonology
Russian	Conservative Moscow Standard	позже	[poʑːe]	'later'	Somewhat obsolete in many words, in which most speakers realize it as hard [ʐː]. Present only in a few words, usually written ⟨жж⟩ or ⟨зж⟩. See Russian phonology
Slovak	Eastern slovak dialects	zima	[ʑima]	'winter'	Sometimes it is considered only as allophone of the phoneme /z/ before front vowels (i, e). See Slovak phonology.
Sema		aji	[à̠ʑì]	'blood'	Possible allophone of /ʒ/ before /i, e/; can be realized as [d͡ʑ ~ ʒ ~ d͡ʒ] instead.
Serbo-Croatian	Serbian and Croatian	puž će	[pûːʑ t͡ɕe̞]	'the snail will'	Allophone of /ʒ/ before /t͡ɕ, d͡ʑ/. See Serbo-Croatian phonology
Serbo-Croatian	Some speakers of Montenegrin	źenica/з́еница	[ʑȇ̞nit̻͡s̪a̠]	'pupil'	Phonemically /zj/ or, in some cases, /z/.
Spanish	Paraguayan	carro	[ˈkaʑo]	'car'	Non-standard, dialectal realization of /r/ and allophone of /ɾ/ after /t/.
Tatar	Kazan dialect (standard Tatar)	җан / can	[ʑan]	'soul'	In Mishar Dialect, letter җ / c is [d͡ʒ].
Uzbek					
Xumi	Upper	[ʑɐ̝˦]		'beer, wine'	
Yi		ꑳ/yi	[ʑi˧]	'tobacco'	

== See also ==
- Index of phonetics articles

== Notes ==
Place →	Labial					Coronal										Dorsal					Laryngeal			
Manner ↓	Bilabial		Labiodental		Linguolabial		Dental		Alveolar		Postalveolar		Retroflex		(Alveolo-)palatal		Velar		Uvular		Pharyngeal/epiglottal		Glottal	
Nasal	m̥	m	ɱ̊	ɱ		n̼	n̪̊	n̪	n̥	n	n̠̊	n̠	ɳ̊	ɳ	ɲ̊	ɲ	ŋ̊	ŋ	ɴ̥	ɴ				
Plosive	p	b	p̪	b̪	t̼	d̼	t̪	d̪	t	d			ʈ	ɖ	c	ɟ	k	ɡ	q	ɢ	ʡ		ʔ	
Sibilant affricate							t̪s̪	d̪z̪	ts	dz	t̠ʃ	d̠ʒ	tʂ	dʐ	tɕ	dʑ								
Non-sibilant affricate	pɸ	bβ	p̪f	b̪v			t̪θ	d̪ð	tɹ̝̊	dɹ̝	t̠ɹ̠̊˔	d̠ɹ̠˔			cç	ɟʝ	kx	ɡɣ	qχ	ɢʁ	ʡʜ	ʡʢ	ʔh	
Sibilant fricative							s̪	z̪	s	z	ʃ	ʒ	ʂ	ʐ	ɕ	ʑ								
Non-sibilant fricative	ɸ	β	f	v	θ̼	ð̼	θ	ð	θ̠	ð̠	ɹ̠̊˔	ɹ̠˔	ɻ̊˔	ɻ˔	ç	ʝ	x	ɣ	χ	ʁ	ħ	ʕ	h	ɦ
Approximant		β̞		ʋ				ð̞		ɹ		ɹ̠		ɻ		j		ɰ						˷
Tap/flap		ⱱ̟		ⱱ					ɾ̥	ɾ			ɽ̊	ɽ						ɢ̆		ʡ̆		
Trill	ʙ̥	ʙ							r̥	r		r̠	ɽ̊r̥	ɽr					ʀ̥	ʀ	ʜ	ʢ		
Lateral affricate									tɬ	dɮ			tꞎ	d𝼅	c𝼆	ɟʎ̝	k𝼄	ɡʟ̝						
Lateral fricative							ɬ̪		ɬ	ɮ			ꞎ	𝼅	𝼆	ʎ̝	𝼄	ʟ̝						
Lateral approximant								l̪	l̥	l		l̠	ɭ̊	ɭ	ʎ̥	ʎ	ʟ̥	ʟ		ʟ̠				
Lateral tap/flap									ɺ̥	ɺ			𝼈̊	𝼈		ʎ̆		ʟ̆						

		BL	LD	D	A	PA	RF	P	V	U
Implosive	Voiced	ɓ			ɗ		ᶑ	ʄ	ɠ	ʛ
Implosive	Voiceless	ɓ̥			ɗ̥		ᶑ̊	ʄ̊	ɠ̊	ʛ̥
Ejective	Stop	pʼ			tʼ		ʈʼ	cʼ	kʼ	qʼ
Ejective	Affricate		p̪fʼ	tθʼ	tsʼ	tʃʼ	tʂʼ	tɕʼ	kxʼ	qχʼ
Ejective	Fricative	ɸʼ	fʼ	θʼ	sʼ	ʃʼ	ʂʼ	ɕʼ	xʼ	χʼ
Ejective	Lateral affricate				tɬʼ			c𝼆ʼ	k𝼄ʼ	q𝼄ʼ
Ejective	Lateral fricative				ɬʼ					
Click (top: velar; bottom: uvular)	Tenuis	kʘ qʘ		kǀ qǀ	kǃ qǃ		k𝼊 q𝼊	kǂ qǂ		
Click (top: velar; bottom: uvular)	Voiced	ɡʘ ɢʘ		ɡǀ ɢǀ	ɡǃ ɢǃ		ɡ𝼊 ɢ𝼊	ɡǂ ɢǂ		
Click (top: velar; bottom: uvular)	Nasal	ŋʘ ɴʘ		ŋǀ ɴǀ	ŋǃ ɴǃ		ŋ𝼊 ɴ𝼊	ŋǂ ɴǂ	ʞ	
Click (top: velar; bottom: uvular)	Tenuis lateral				kǁ qǁ					
Click (top: velar; bottom: uvular)	Voiced lateral				ɡǁ ɢǁ					
Click (top: velar; bottom: uvular)	Nasal lateral				ŋǁ ɴǁ					
