= Voiced alveolo-palatal affricate =

Consonantal sound

dʑ

ʥ

ɟʑ
- IPA number: 216

Audio sample
- source · help

Encoding
- Entity (decimal): &#677;
- Unicode (hex): U+02A5
- X-SAMPA: d_z\
Image

A voiced alveolo-palatal sibilant affricate is a type of consonantal sound, used in some spoken languages. The symbols in the International Phonetic Alphabet that represent this sound are ⟨d͡ʑ⟩, ⟨d͜ʑ⟩. The tie bar may be omitted, yielding ⟨dʑ⟩. There is also a ligature ⟨ʥ⟩, which has been retired by the International Phonetic Association but is still used. Occasionally the stop component is transcribed ⟨ɟ⟩. An older transcription that indicated approximately the same sound was ⟨dʓ⟩.

⟨d⟩ is a broad transcription of the stop component, which can be narrowly transcribed as ⟨d̠ʲ⟩ (retracted and palatalized [d]). There is also a para-IPA letter ⟨ȡ⟩. Therefore, narrow transcriptions include ⟨d̠ʲʑ⟩ and ⟨ȡʑ⟩. However, this is not normally done because the stop component is by default assumed to be homorganic with the fricative component of the consonant.

[dʑ] is the sibilant equivalent of a voiced palatal affricate.

== Features ==
Features of a voiced alveolo-palatal affricate:

- Its manner of articulation is sibilant affricate, which means it is produced by first stopping the air flow entirely, then directing it with the tongue to the sharp edge of the teeth, causing high-frequency turbulence.
- Its place of articulation is alveolo-palatal. This means that:
  - The articulation is postalveolar and laminal, meaning that the tongue blade contacts the roof of the mouth in the area behind the alveolar ridge (the gum line). Some phoneticians instead argue that the articulation is pre-palatal and dorsal, meaning that the back of the tongue (the dorsum) is raised toward the front of the hard palate.
  - It is heavily palatalized, meaning that the middle of the tongue is bowed and raised towards the hard palate.
- Its phonation is voiced, which means the vocal cords vibrate during the articulation.
- It is an oral consonant, which means that air is not allowed to escape through the nose.
- It is a median consonant, which means it is produced by directing the airstream down the midline of the tongue, rather than to the sides.
- Its airstream mechanism is pulmonic, which means it is articulated by pushing air only with the intercostal muscles and abdominal muscles, as in most speech sounds.

== Occurrence ==
Language		Word	IPA	Meaning	Notes
Bengali		যখন	[ˈd͡ʑɔkʰon]	'when'	Contrasts aspirated form. See Bengali phonology
Burmese		ဂျင်	[d͡ʑɪ̀ɰ̃]	'top (toy)'	
Catalan	Most dialects	mitjà	[mi̞(d)ˈd͡ʑa]	'means'	See Catalan phonology
Catalan	Valencian	joc	[ˈd͡ʑɒ̝k]	'game'	Standard and usual affricated pronunciation found in Valencian, and also in parts of Southern and Western Catalonia. See Catalan phonology
Catalan	Some dialects	dotze	[ˈd̪o(d)d͡ʑe]	'twelve'	Merger of /d͡z/ with /d͡ʒ/ [d͡ʑ] in Tortosan and some Valencian dialects. See Catalan phonology
Catalan	Some dialects	tots alhora	[ˈt̪od͡ʑ‿əˈɫɔɾə]	'all at once'	Voiced allophone of final /t͡s/. See Catalan phonology
Chinese	Southern Min	日 / ji̍t	[d͡ʑit̚˧ʔ]	'sun'	
Chinese	Wu	渠	[d͡ʑy]	'he/she/it'	
Irish	Some dialects	dearg	[ˈd͡ʑaɾˠəɡ]	'red'	Realization of the palatalized alveolar stop /dʲ/ in dialects such as Erris, Teelin and Tourmakeady. See Irish phonology
Japanese		知人 / chijin	[t͡ɕid͡ʑĩ́ɴ]	'acquaintance'	Also transcribed as /ʑ/. See Japanese phonology
Kalmyk		чееҗ / cheej	[t͡ɕeːd͡ʑə̟́]	'chest'	
Kazakh	Some speakers	жер / jer	[d͡ʑe̘r̥]	'land'	Often realized as /ʒ/. See Kazakh phonology
Korean	South	편지 / pyeonji	[pʰjʌ̹ːnd͡ʑi]	'letter'	See Korean phonology
Kyrgyz	Some speakers	жок / jok	[d͡ʑo̞q]	'no'	Typically postalveolar /dʒ/. See Kyrgyz phonology
Marathi	Some speakers	जीवन / jīvana	[d͡ʑiːʋʌ̝n̪]	'life'	In free variation with palato-alveolar /dʒ/.
Malay	Jambi	توجوه / tujuh	[tud͡ʑʊh]	'seven'	See Jambi Malay
Okinawan		fijeetiinagaa	[ɸid͡ʑeːtiːnagaː]	'thief'	
Polish		dźwięk	[d͡ʑvʲɛŋk]	'sound'	See Polish phonology
Romanian	Banat dialect	des	[d͡ʑes]	'frequent'	Allophone of /d/ before front vowels. Corresponds to [d] in standard Romanian. See Romanian phonology
Russian		дочь бы	[ˈd̪o̞d͡ʑ bɨ]	'daughter would'	Allophone of /t͡ɕ/ before voiced consonants. See Russian phonology
Sema		aji	[à̠d͡ʑì]	'blood'	Possible allophone of /ʒ/ before /i, e/; can be realized as [ʑ ~ ʒ ~ d͡ʒ] instead.
Serbo-Croatian		ђаво / đavo	[d͡ʑâ̠ʋo̞ː]	'devil'	Merges with /d͡ʒ/ in Kajkavian and Chakavian dialects. See Serbo-Croatian phonology
Swedish		djur	[d͡ʑʉːr]	'animal'	Allophone of /j/ in initial position in older Standard Swedish, Norrbotten and Finland
Uzbek	Some speakers	jon	[d͡ʑɒ̽n]	'dear'	Typically postalveolar /dʒ/. See Uzbek phonology
Xumi	Lower	[d͡ʑɐʔ˦]		'water'	
Xumi	Upper	[d͡ʑɐ̝˦]		'water'	
Yi		ꐚ / jji	[d͡ʑi˧]	'bee'	

== See also ==
- Index of phonetics articles
- Voiceless alveolo-palatal affricate
- Voiced palatal affricate

== Notes ==
Place →	Labial					Coronal										Dorsal					Laryngeal			
Manner ↓	Bilabial		Labiodental		Linguolabial		Dental		Alveolar		Postalveolar		Retroflex		(Alveolo-)palatal		Velar		Uvular		Pharyngeal/epiglottal		Glottal	
Nasal	m̥	m	ɱ̊	ɱ		n̼	n̪̊	n̪	n̥	n	n̠̊	n̠	ɳ̊	ɳ	ɲ̊	ɲ	ŋ̊	ŋ	ɴ̥	ɴ				
Plosive	p	b	p̪	b̪	t̼	d̼	t̪	d̪	t	d			ʈ	ɖ	c	ɟ	k	ɡ	q	ɢ	ʡ		ʔ	
Sibilant affricate							t̪s̪	d̪z̪	ts	dz	t̠ʃ	d̠ʒ	tʂ	dʐ	tɕ	dʑ								
Non-sibilant affricate	pɸ	bβ	p̪f	b̪v			t̪θ	d̪ð	tɹ̝̊	dɹ̝	t̠ɹ̠̊˔	d̠ɹ̠˔			cç	ɟʝ	kx	ɡɣ	qχ	ɢʁ	ʡʜ	ʡʢ	ʔh	
Sibilant fricative							s̪	z̪	s	z	ʃ	ʒ	ʂ	ʐ	ɕ	ʑ								
Non-sibilant fricative	ɸ	β	f	v	θ̼	ð̼	θ	ð	θ̠	ð̠	ɹ̠̊˔	ɹ̠˔	ɻ̊˔	ɻ˔	ç	ʝ	x	ɣ	χ	ʁ	ħ	ʕ	h	ɦ
Approximant		β̞		ʋ				ð̞		ɹ		ɹ̠		ɻ		j		ɰ						˷
Tap/flap		ⱱ̟		ⱱ					ɾ̥	ɾ			ɽ̊	ɽ						ɢ̆		ʡ̆		
Trill	ʙ̥	ʙ							r̥	r		r̠	ɽ̊r̥	ɽr					ʀ̥	ʀ	ʜ	ʢ		
Lateral affricate									tɬ	dɮ			tꞎ	d𝼅	c𝼆	ɟʎ̝	k𝼄	ɡʟ̝						
Lateral fricative							ɬ̪		ɬ	ɮ			ꞎ	𝼅	𝼆	ʎ̝	𝼄	ʟ̝						
Lateral approximant								l̪	l̥	l		l̠	ɭ̊	ɭ	ʎ̥	ʎ	ʟ̥	ʟ		ʟ̠				
Lateral tap/flap									ɺ̥	ɺ			𝼈̊	𝼈		ʎ̆		ʟ̆						

		BL	LD	D	A	PA	RF	P	V	U
Implosive	Voiced	ɓ			ɗ		ᶑ	ʄ	ɠ	ʛ
Implosive	Voiceless	ɓ̥			ɗ̥		ᶑ̊	ʄ̊	ɠ̊	ʛ̥
Ejective	Stop	pʼ			tʼ		ʈʼ	cʼ	kʼ	qʼ
Ejective	Affricate		p̪fʼ	tθʼ	tsʼ	tʃʼ	tʂʼ	tɕʼ	kxʼ	qχʼ
Ejective	Fricative	ɸʼ	fʼ	θʼ	sʼ	ʃʼ	ʂʼ	ɕʼ	xʼ	χʼ
Ejective	Lateral affricate				tɬʼ			c𝼆ʼ	k𝼄ʼ	q𝼄ʼ
Ejective	Lateral fricative				ɬʼ					
Click (top: velar; bottom: uvular)	Tenuis	kʘ qʘ		kǀ qǀ	kǃ qǃ		k𝼊 q𝼊	kǂ qǂ		
Click (top: velar; bottom: uvular)	Voiced	ɡʘ ɢʘ		ɡǀ ɢǀ	ɡǃ ɢǃ		ɡ𝼊 ɢ𝼊	ɡǂ ɢǂ		
Click (top: velar; bottom: uvular)	Nasal	ŋʘ ɴʘ		ŋǀ ɴǀ	ŋǃ ɴǃ		ŋ𝼊 ɴ𝼊	ŋǂ ɴǂ	ʞ	
Click (top: velar; bottom: uvular)	Tenuis lateral				kǁ qǁ					
Click (top: velar; bottom: uvular)	Voiced lateral				ɡǁ ɢǁ					
Click (top: velar; bottom: uvular)	Nasal lateral				ŋǁ ɴǁ					
