= Voiced retroflex fricative =

Consonantal sound represented by ⟨ʐ⟩ in IPA

ʐ
- IPA number: 137

Audio sample
- source · help

Encoding
- Entity (decimal): &#656;
- Unicode (hex): U+0290
- X-SAMPA: z`
- Braille: ⠲ (braille pattern dots-256) ⠵ (braille pattern dots-1356)
Image

A voiced retroflex sibilant fricative is a type of consonantal sound, used in some spoken languages. The symbol in the International Phonetic Alphabet that represents this sound is ⟨ʐ⟩. Like all the retroflex consonants, the IPA symbol is formed by adding a rightward-pointing hook extending from the bottom of a z (the letter used for the corresponding alveolar consonant).

== Features ==
Sagittal section of a voiced retroflex fricative

Features of a voiced retroflex sibilant:

- Its manner of articulation is sibilant (a subclass of fricatives and affricates), which means it is generally produced with a higher-frequency turbulence. Sibilants may be articulated with various tongue shapes and degrees of palatalization, depending on their place of articulation.
- Its place of articulation is retroflex, which prototypically means it is articulated subapical (with the tip of the tongue curled up), but more generally, it means that it is postalveolar without being palatalized. That is, besides the prototypical subapical articulation, the tongue can be apical (pointed) or, in some fricatives, laminal (flat).
- Its phonation is voiced, which means the vocal cords vibrate during the articulation.
- It is an oral consonant, which means that air is not allowed to escape through the nose.
- It is a median consonant, which means it is produced by directing the airstream down the midline of the tongue, rather than to the sides.
- Its airstream mechanism is pulmonic, which means it is articulated by pushing air only with the intercostal muscles and abdominal muscles, as in most speech sounds.

== Occurrence ==
In the following transcriptions, diacritics may be used to distinguish between apical [ʐ̺] and laminal [ʐ̻].

Language		Word	IPA	Meaning	Notes
Abkhaz		абжа/abža	[ˈabʐa]	'half'	See Abkhaz phonology
Adyghe		жъы / jı / ظ‍‍ہ	[ʐ̻ə]	'old'	Laminal.
Awetí		[pɨtiˈʐɨk˺]		'to pray'	Diachronically related to [ɾ] and also to some other alveolar sounds in certain occasions. As word lists created in the 1900s appoint for [ɾ] where there is [ʐ] now, the latter sound is supposed to be the result of a very recent sound change that is analogically happening in Waurá.
Chinese	Mandarin	肉 / ròu	[ʐoʊ̯˥˩]	'meat'	Also transcribed as a retroflex approximant [ɻ] depending on accent and dialect. See Mandarin phonology.
Chinese	Changshu dialect	常熟	[tʂʱä̃˨˧˧ ʐɔʔ˨˧]	'Changshu'	Pronounced [ʂʱ] when occurring at the first syllable. A native Wu Chinese speaker may reduce it a sound closer to a retroflex approximant [ɻ] (similar to the Standard Mandarin r) when trying to force an unnatural voiced pronunciation on the first syllable.
Faroese		renn	[ʐɛn]	'run'	
Lower Sorbian		Łužyca	[ˈwuʐɨt͡sa]	'Lusatia'	
Mapudungun		rayen	[ʐɜˈjën]	'flower'	May be [ɻ] or [ɭ] instead.
Marringarr		ʐamu	[ʐɐmʊ]	'long-necked turtle'	
Marrithiyel	Marri Tjevin dialect	[wiˈɲaʐu]		'they are laughing'	Voicing is non-contrastive.
Mehináku		[ɨˈʐũte]		'parrot'	Resulted from the voicing of /ʂ/ in between vowels.
Pashto	Southern dialect	tâjai / ت‍ږى	[ˈtəʐai]	'thirsty'	See Pashto phonology
Polish	Standard	żona	[ˈʐ̻ɔn̪ä]	'wife'	Also represented orthographically by ⟨rz⟩ and, when written so, may be instead pronounced as the raised alveolar non-sonorant trill by few speakers. It is transcribed as /ʒ/ by most Polish scholars. See Polish phonology
Polish	Southeastern Cuyavian dialects	zapłacił	[ʐäˈpwät͡ɕiw]	'he paid'	Some speakers. It is a result of hypercorrecting the more popular merger of /ʐ/ and /z/ into [z] (see Szadzenie).
Polish	Suwałki dialect	zapłacił	[ʐäˈpwät͡ɕiw]	'he paid'	Some speakers. It is a result of hypercorrecting the more popular merger of /ʐ/ and /z/ into [z] (see Szadzenie).
Romagnol		diṣ	[ˈdiːʐ]	'ten'	Apical; may be [z̺ʲ] or [ʒ] instead.
Russian	Standard	жена / žená	[ʐɨ̞ˈna]	'wife'	Concave apical postalveolar, no true subapicality as expected from retroflexes. Tend to be labialised and/ or velarised. See Russian phonology
Russian	Most speakers in most words	заезжа́ть/ zajezžátʹ	[zə(j)ɪˈʐːatʲ]	'to call in casually /to drive into'	Modern pronunciation of older /ʑː/ often derived from underlying /zʐ/ or /sʐ/. Subsists as such in some words for conservative Moskovite accents.
Serbo-Croatian		жут / žut	[ʐûːt̪]	'yellow'	Typically transcribed as /ʒ/. See Serbo-Croatian phonology
Shina	Gilgiti	ڙَکُݨ / ẓakuṇ	[ʐəkuɳ]	'donkey'	
Shina	Kohistani	ڙَکُݨ / ẓakuṇ	[ʐəkuɳ]	'donkey'	
Slovak		žaba	[ˈʐäbä]	'frog'	
Spanish	Andean	hacer	[a'seʐ]	'do'	The phoneme /r/ changes to [ʐ], when it is at the end of a syllable
Spanish	Andean	marrón, ratón	[maˈʐon], [ʐa'ton]	'brown', 'mouse'	See Spanish phonology
Swedish	Central dialects	rå	[ʐʊɞ̯]	'raw'	Apical. Allophone of rhotic, may also be pronounced [ɹ], [r] or [ɾ]. See Swedish phonology
Taruma		hoza	[ˈho.ʐa]	'rain'	Main allophone of a marginal retroflex phoneme, with [ɖʐ] as quasi-allohpone word initially before /ɨ/.
Tilquiapan Zapotec		?	[ʐan]	'bottom'	
Torwali		ݜوڙ	[ʂuʐ]	'straight'	
Ubykh		[ʐa]		'firewood'	See Ubykh phonology
Ukrainian		жaбa / žaba	[ˈʐɑbɐ]	'frog'	See Ukrainian phonology
Upper Sorbian	Some dialects				Used in dialects spoken in villages north of Hoyerswerda; corresponds to [ʒ] in the standard language.
Yi		ꏜ / ry	[ʐʐ̩˧]	'grass'	

== Voiced retroflex non-sibilant fricative ==
Voiced retroflex non-sibilant fricative

ɻ᷵

ɖ˕
- IPA number: 152 429

Audio sample
- source · help

Encoding
- X-SAMPA: r\`_r

=== Features ===
Features of a voiced retroflex non-sibilant fricative:

- Its manner of articulation is fricative, which means it is produced by constricting air flow through a narrow channel at the place of articulation, causing turbulence.
- Its place of articulation is retroflex, which prototypically means it is articulated subapical (with the tip of the tongue curled up), but more generally, it means that it is postalveolar without being palatalized. That is, besides the prototypical subapical articulation, the tongue can be apical (pointed) or, in some fricatives, laminal (flat).
- Its phonation is voiced, which means the vocal cords vibrate during the articulation.
- It is an oral consonant, which means that air is not allowed to escape through the nose.
- It is a median consonant, which means it is produced by directing the airstream down the midline of the tongue, rather than to the sides.
- Its airstream mechanism is pulmonic, which means it is articulated by pushing air only with the intercostal muscles and abdominal muscles, as in most speech sounds.

=== Occurrence ===
Language		Word	IPA	Meaning	Notes
English	Eastern Cape	red	[ɻ᷵ed]	'red'	Apical; typical realization of /r/ in that region. See South African English phonology

== See also ==
- Index of phonetics articles
- Voiced postalveolar fricative
- Voiceless retroflex fricative

== Citations ==
Place →	Labial					Coronal										Dorsal					Laryngeal			
Manner ↓	Bilabial		Labiodental		Linguolabial		Dental		Alveolar		Postalveolar		Retroflex		(Alveolo-)palatal		Velar		Uvular		Pharyngeal/epiglottal		Glottal	
Nasal	m̥	m	ɱ̊	ɱ		n̼	n̪̊	n̪	n̥	n	n̠̊	n̠	ɳ̊	ɳ	ɲ̊	ɲ	ŋ̊	ŋ	ɴ̥	ɴ				
Plosive	p	b	p̪	b̪	t̼	d̼	t̪	d̪	t	d			ʈ	ɖ	c	ɟ	k	ɡ	q	ɢ	ʡ		ʔ	
Sibilant affricate							t̪s̪	d̪z̪	ts	dz	t̠ʃ	d̠ʒ	tʂ	dʐ	tɕ	dʑ								
Non-sibilant affricate	pɸ	bβ	p̪f	b̪v			t̪θ	d̪ð	tɹ̝̊	dɹ̝	t̠ɹ̠̊˔	d̠ɹ̠˔			cç	ɟʝ	kx	ɡɣ	qχ	ɢʁ	ʡʜ	ʡʢ	ʔh	
Sibilant fricative							s̪	z̪	s	z	ʃ	ʒ	ʂ	ʐ	ɕ	ʑ								
Non-sibilant fricative	ɸ	β	f	v	θ̼	ð̼	θ	ð	θ̠	ð̠	ɹ̠̊˔	ɹ̠˔	ɻ̊˔	ɻ˔	ç	ʝ	x	ɣ	χ	ʁ	ħ	ʕ	h	ɦ
Approximant		β̞		ʋ				ð̞		ɹ		ɹ̠		ɻ		j		ɰ						˷
Tap/flap		ⱱ̟		ⱱ					ɾ̥	ɾ			ɽ̊	ɽ						ɢ̆		ʡ̆		
Trill	ʙ̥	ʙ							r̥	r		r̠	ɽ̊r̥	ɽr					ʀ̥	ʀ	ʜ	ʢ		
Lateral affricate									tɬ	dɮ			tꞎ	d𝼅	c𝼆	ɟʎ̝	k𝼄	ɡʟ̝						
Lateral fricative							ɬ̪		ɬ	ɮ			ꞎ	𝼅	𝼆	ʎ̝	𝼄	ʟ̝						
Lateral approximant								l̪	l̥	l		l̠	ɭ̊	ɭ	ʎ̥	ʎ	ʟ̥	ʟ		ʟ̠				
Lateral tap/flap									ɺ̥	ɺ			𝼈̊	𝼈		ʎ̆		ʟ̆						

		BL	LD	D	A	PA	RF	P	V	U
Implosive	Voiced	ɓ			ɗ		ᶑ	ʄ	ɠ	ʛ
Implosive	Voiceless	ɓ̥			ɗ̥		ᶑ̊	ʄ̊	ɠ̊	ʛ̥
Ejective	Stop	pʼ			tʼ		ʈʼ	cʼ	kʼ	qʼ
Ejective	Affricate		p̪fʼ	tθʼ	tsʼ	tʃʼ	tʂʼ	tɕʼ	kxʼ	qχʼ
Ejective	Fricative	ɸʼ	fʼ	θʼ	sʼ	ʃʼ	ʂʼ	ɕʼ	xʼ	χʼ
Ejective	Lateral affricate				tɬʼ			c𝼆ʼ	k𝼄ʼ	q𝼄ʼ
Ejective	Lateral fricative				ɬʼ					
Click (top: velar; bottom: uvular)	Tenuis	kʘ qʘ		kǀ qǀ	kǃ qǃ		k𝼊 q𝼊	kǂ qǂ		
Click (top: velar; bottom: uvular)	Voiced	ɡʘ ɢʘ		ɡǀ ɢǀ	ɡǃ ɢǃ		ɡ𝼊 ɢ𝼊	ɡǂ ɢǂ		
Click (top: velar; bottom: uvular)	Nasal	ŋʘ ɴʘ		ŋǀ ɴǀ	ŋǃ ɴǃ		ŋ𝼊 ɴ𝼊	ŋǂ ɴǂ	ʞ	
Click (top: velar; bottom: uvular)	Tenuis lateral				kǁ qǁ					
Click (top: velar; bottom: uvular)	Voiced lateral				ɡǁ ɢǁ					
Click (top: velar; bottom: uvular)	Nasal lateral				ŋǁ ɴǁ					
