= Voiced retroflex affricate =

Consonantal sound

dʐ

ɖʐ

ꭦ
- IPA number: 106 (137)

Audio sample
- source · help

Encoding
- Entity (decimal): &#598;&#865;&#656;
- Unicode (hex): U+0256 U+0361 U+0290
- X-SAMPA: dz`
Image

A voiced retroflex sibilant affricate is a type of consonantal sound, used in some spoken languages. The symbol in the International Phonetic Alphabet that represents this sound is ⟨ɖ͡ʐ ⟩ or ⟨d̠͡ʐ ⟩, often simplified to ⟨dʐ ⟩. There is also a ligature ⟨ꭦ ⟩, which has been retired by the International Phonetic Association but is still used.

A laminal variant occurs in Polish dż, and apical variants in the Indo-Aryan languages.

== Features ==
Features of a voiced retroflex affricate:

- Its manner of articulation is sibilant affricate, which means it is produced by first stopping the air flow entirely, then directing it with the tongue to the sharp edge of the teeth, causing high-frequency turbulence.
- Its place of articulation is retroflex, which prototypically means it is articulated subapical (with the tip of the tongue curled up), but more generally, it means that it is postalveolar without being palatalized. That is, besides the prototypical subapical articulation, the tongue can be apical (pointed) or, in some fricatives, laminal (flat).
- Its phonation is voiced, which means the vocal cords vibrate during the articulation.
- It is an oral consonant, which means that air is not allowed to escape through the nose.
- It is a median consonant, which means it is produced by directing the airstream down the midline of the tongue, rather than to the sides.
- Its airstream mechanism is pulmonic, which means it is articulated by pushing air only with the intercostal muscles and abdominal muscles, as in most speech sounds.

== Occurrence ==
| Language | | Word | IPA | Meaning | Notes |
|---|---|---|---|---|---|
| Asturian | Some dialects | ḷḷuna | ['ɖ͡ʐunä] | 'moon' | Corresponds to /ʎ/ in other dialects. See Che Vaqueira |
| Belarusian | | джаз | [ɖ͡ʐas] | 'jazz' | Laminal. See Belarusian phonology |
| Chinese | Wu | 长 | [ɖ͡ʐaŋ] | 'to grow' | Only found in a few Wu dialects. |
| Chinese | Some Mandarin speakers | 广州 | [kwaŋ˨˩ ɖ͡ʐoʊ˥˥] | 'Guangzhou' | |
| Khowar | | ݮـنـݮـیر | [ɖ͡ʐanɖ͡ʐer] | 'chain' | - |
| Polish | Standard | dżin | [ɖ͡ʐin̪] | 'genie' | Laminal; transcribed /d͡ʒ/ by most Polish scholars. See Polish phonology |
| Polish | Southeastern Cuyavian dialects | dzwon | [ɖ͡ʐvɔn̪] | 'bell' | Some speakers. A result of hypercorrecting the more popular merger of /ɖ͡ʐ/ and /d͡z/ into [d͡z]. |
| Polish | Suwałki dialect | dzwon | [ɖ͡ʐvɔn̪] | 'bell' | Some speakers. A result of hypercorrecting the more popular merger of /ɖ͡ʐ/ and /d͡z/ into [d͡z]. |
| Northern Qiang | | vvdhe | [ʁɖ͡ʐə] | 'star' | |
| Serbo-Croatian | | џеп/džep | [ɖ͡ʐê̞p] | 'pocket' | Apical. It may be palato-alveolar instead, depending on the dialect. See Serbo-Croatian phonology |
| Slovak | | džús | [ɖ͡ʐu̞ːs] | 'juice' | Laminal. |
| Torwali | | حؕـىگ | [ɖ͡ʐiɡ̥] | 'long' | Contrasts with a palatal affricate. |
| Yi | | ꎐ / rry | [ɖ͡ʐɪ˧] | 'tooth' | |

== Voiced retroflex non-sibilant affricate ==
Voiced retroflex non-sibilant affricate

dɻ᷵

ɖɻ᷵

Audio sample
- source · help

The non-sibilant counterpart is a voiced retroflex non-sibilant affricate, which may occur in Malagasy. The symbol in the International Phonetic Alphabet that represents this sound is ⟨ɖɻ᷵⟩ or ⟨d̠͡ɻ̝⟩.

=== Features ===
- Its manner of articulation is affricate, which means it is produced by first stopping the airflow entirely, then allowing air flow through a constricted channel at the place of articulation, causing turbulence.
- Its place of articulation is retroflex, which prototypically means it is articulated subapical (with the tip of the tongue curled up), but more generally, it means that it is postalveolar without being palatalized. That is, besides the prototypical subapical articulation, the tongue can be apical (pointed) or, in some fricatives, laminal (flat).
- Its phonation is voiced, which means the vocal cords vibrate during the articulation.
- It is an oral consonant, which means that air is not allowed to escape through the nose.
- It is a median consonant, which means it is produced by directing the airstream down the midline of the tongue, rather than to the sides.
- Its airstream mechanism is pulmonic, which means it is articulated by pushing air only with the intercostal muscles and abdominal muscles, as in most speech sounds.

=== Occurrence ===
| Language | Word | IPA | Meaning | Notes |
|---|---|---|---|---|
| Malagasy | andriana | [ˈaᶯɖɻ᷵iən(ə̥)] | 'nobility' | Also described as regular plosives, trilled affricates and sibilant affricates. |

== See also ==
- Voiced retroflex lateral affricate
- Voiceless retroflex affricate
- Index of phonetics articles

== Notes ==
| Place → | Labial | | | | | Coronal | | | | | | | | | | Dorsal | | | | | Laryngeal | | | |
| Manner ↓ | Bilabial | | Labiodental | | Linguolabial | | Dental | | Alveolar | | Postalveolar | | Retroflex | | (Alveolo-)palatal | | Velar | | Uvular | | Pharyngeal/epiglottal | | Glottal | |
|---|---|---|---|---|---|---|---|---|---|---|---|---|---|---|---|---|---|---|---|---|---|---|---|---|
| Nasal | m̥ | m | ɱ̊ | ɱ | | n̼ | n̪̊ | n̪ | n̥ | n | n̠̊ | n̠ | ɳ̊ | ɳ | ɲ̊ | ɲ | ŋ̊ | ŋ | ɴ̥ | ɴ | | | | |
| Plosive | p | b | p̪ | b̪ | t̼ | d̼ | t̪ | d̪ | t | d | | | ʈ | ɖ | c | ɟ | k | ɡ | q | ɢ | ʡ | | ʔ | |
| Sibilant affricate | | | | | | | t̪s̪ | d̪z̪ | ts | dz | t̠ʃ | d̠ʒ | tʂ | dʐ | tɕ | dʑ | | | | | | | | |
| Non-sibilant affricate | pɸ | bβ | p̪f | b̪v | | | t̪θ | d̪ð | tɹ̝̊ | dɹ̝ | t̠ɹ̠̊˔ | d̠ɹ̠˔ | | | cç | ɟʝ | kx | ɡɣ | qχ | ɢʁ | ʡʜ | ʡʢ | ʔh | |
| Sibilant fricative | | | | | | | s̪ | z̪ | s | z | ʃ | ʒ | ʂ | ʐ | ɕ | ʑ | | | | | | | | |
| Non-sibilant fricative | ɸ | β | f | v | θ̼ | ð̼ | θ | ð | θ̠ | ð̠ | ɹ̠̊˔ | ɹ̠˔ | ɻ̊˔ | ɻ˔ | ç | ʝ | x | ɣ | χ | ʁ | ħ | ʕ | h | ɦ |
| Approximant | | β̞ | | ʋ | | | | ð̞ | | ɹ | | ɹ̠ | | ɻ | | j | | ɰ | | | | | | ˷ |
| Tap/flap | | ⱱ̟ | | ⱱ | | | | | ɾ̥ | ɾ | | | ɽ̊ | ɽ | | | | | | ɢ̆ | | ʡ̆ | | |
| Trill | ʙ̥ | ʙ | | | | | | | r̥ | r | | r̠ | ɽ̊r̥ | ɽr | | | | | ʀ̥ | ʀ | ʜ | ʢ | | |
| Lateral affricate | | | | | | | | | tɬ | dɮ | | | tꞎ | d𝼅 | c𝼆 | ɟʎ̝ | k𝼄 | ɡʟ̝ | | | | | | |
| Lateral fricative | | | | | | | ɬ̪ | | ɬ | ɮ | | | ꞎ | 𝼅 | 𝼆 | ʎ̝ | 𝼄 | ʟ̝ | | | | | | |
| Lateral approximant | | | | | | | | l̪ | l̥ | l | | l̠ | ɭ̊ | ɭ | ʎ̥ | ʎ | ʟ̥ | ʟ | | ʟ̠ | | | | |
| Lateral tap/flap | | | | | | | | | ɺ̥ | ɺ | | | 𝼈̊ | 𝼈 | | ʎ̆ | | ʟ̆ | | | | | | |

| | | BL | LD | D | A | PA | RF | P | V | U |
|---|---|---|---|---|---|---|---|---|---|---|
| Implosive | Voiced | ɓ | | | ɗ | | ᶑ | ʄ | ɠ | ʛ |
| Implosive | Voiceless | ɓ̥ | | | ɗ̥ | | ᶑ̊ | ʄ̊ | ɠ̊ | ʛ̥ |
| Ejective | Stop | pʼ | | | tʼ | | ʈʼ | cʼ | kʼ | qʼ |
| Ejective | Affricate | | p̪fʼ | tθʼ | tsʼ | tʃʼ | tʂʼ | tɕʼ | kxʼ | qχʼ |
| Ejective | Fricative | ɸʼ | fʼ | θʼ | sʼ | ʃʼ | ʂʼ | ɕʼ | xʼ | χʼ |
| Ejective | Lateral affricate | | | | tɬʼ | | | c𝼆ʼ | k𝼄ʼ | q𝼄ʼ |
| Ejective | Lateral fricative | | | | ɬʼ | | | | | |
| Click (top: velar; bottom: uvular) | Tenuis | kʘ qʘ | | kǀ qǀ | kǃ qǃ | | k𝼊 q𝼊 | kǂ qǂ | | |
| Click (top: velar; bottom: uvular) | Voiced | ɡʘ ɢʘ | | ɡǀ ɢǀ | ɡǃ ɢǃ | | ɡ𝼊 ɢ𝼊 | ɡǂ ɢǂ | | |
| Click (top: velar; bottom: uvular) | Nasal | ŋʘ ɴʘ | | ŋǀ ɴǀ | ŋǃ ɴǃ | | ŋ𝼊 ɴ𝼊 | ŋǂ ɴǂ | ʞ | |
| Click (top: velar; bottom: uvular) | Tenuis lateral | | | | kǁ qǁ | | | | | |
| Click (top: velar; bottom: uvular) | Voiced lateral | | | | ɡǁ ɢǁ | | | | | |
| Click (top: velar; bottom: uvular) | Nasal lateral | | | | ŋǁ ɴǁ | | | | | |
