= Lhakar =

Tibetan political movement

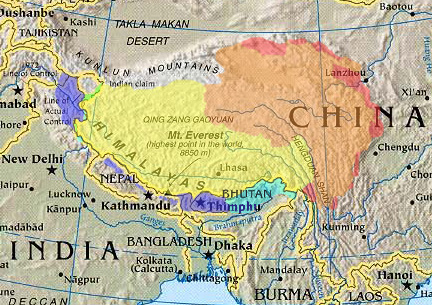
Tibet Autonomous Region within the People's Republic of China
"Greater Tibet"; Tibet as claimed by Tibetan exile groups
Tibetan areas as designated by the People's Republic of China
Chinese-controlled areas claimed by India as part of Aksai Chin
Indian-controlled areas claimed by the People's Republic of China as part of Tibet Autonomous Region
Other areas historically within Tibetan cultural sphere

Lhakar (Standard 'white Wednesday' or 'pure dedication') is the self-reliance Tibetan movement which appeared after the Tibet uprising against Chinese rule. The movement is based on a nonviolence strategy, applied through social, cultural, and economical activities. Participants engage in peaceful boycotts of Chinese businesses and promote traditional Tibetan culture, such as speaking pure Tibetan and wearing the chuba. Chinese authorities perceive the movement as a threat and have detained Tibetans for these activities.

== Origin ==
The Lhakar movement stems from disagreements on the historic, cultural and political status of Tibet, as either an independent country, or as an integral part of the country of China. In 1950, a Chinese military invasion led by Mao Zedong invaded and subsequently took control of Tibet. Since then Tibet has officially been under the Chinese government and Tibetans are classified as one of China's 56 recognized ethnic groups.

However, tensions between China and Tibet have gradually increased since that period as groups within Tibet wish to be independent from China. These tensions took form through rebellious acts. During the mid-1950s to the mid-1970s Tibet's struggle for independence took the form of armed resistance. Then, from the 1980s, resistance was transformed into a non-violent, clergy-led protest, until 2008, where a new type of resistance took place, street protests.

Indeed, after the Tibet uprising in spring 2008 the Chinese authorities increased their military presence in that region. In response to China's military enforcement, the Tibetans have adapted their forms of resistance, hence the birth of the Lhakar movement.

Inspired by nonviolent methods, such as Mahatma Gandhi's, the Lhakar movement has been encouraging the affirmation of Tibetan cultural identity, and this has been visible predominantly from 2008 to the present. Since then, Tibetans have been doing things such as wearing traditional clothes, or speaking Tibetan language. Beginning as a campaign to take simple and practical actions on Wednesdays (the Dalai Lama's soul day), to assert Tibetan cultural identity has evolved into a widespread non-cooperation and self-reliance movement inside Tibet. A growing number of Tibetans are eating only in Tibetan restaurants and boycotting Chinese businesses on Wednesdays. Lhakar makes use of low-risked, sustainable socio-economic activities to try to initiate change.

On November 6, 2010, in Dharamshala approximately 50 monks and nuns started protests in order to demand Chinese respect toward freedom of the Tibetan language. However, it was mainly on November 9, 2010, in Dharamshala, that this protest expanded- around 700 Tibetan monks and nuns, the majority being from Sershul Monastery, were a part of this. They were then stopped by security forces in the Tibetan region of Zachukha during their march towards Sershul. The purpose of this long march was, according to the protesters, to demand ‘freedom, ‘equality’ and more importantly ‘freedom of language’.

These protests were triggered by the event of Chinese authorities confiscating boxes containing money from voluntary fine operations that had taken place among the Tibetan population. Those were completed as an act of punishment for those who spoke Drak kay, which is a mix of the Chinese and Tibetan languages. Chinese authorities were against this; however, with the protests for the return of those boxes, the punitive practice was discontinued by the Chinese authorities.

== Strategy ==
Lhakar's strategy is based on nonviolence. That strategy is applied along three main lines: de-collectivization, weaponization of culture, and non-cooperation.

=== De-collectivization ===
In their fight for human rights and independence, Tibetans have routinely used the most visible form of resistance also known as streets demonstrations. In response to attempts by China to stamp out what they consider as general public disorder, Tibetans adopted a strategy of de-collectivization.

Indeed, through personal actions such as wearing traditional clothes, eating Tibetan food, listening to Tibetan radio, teaching their native language at home, many Tibetans began to use their individual space to assert a cultural identity that they consider to have been suppressed for decades. In a politically charged period, cultural rituals became political actions, because they gave Tibetan people a non-Chinese identity. Emphasizing individual acts of resistance rather than public acts of protest, Lhakar has decentralized the resistance. Through de-collectivization of activism, Lhakar wishes to sustain the Tibetan struggle by empowering the individual.

=== Weaponization of culture ===
Disempowering usual perceptions of culture, Lhakar started to use art, literature, poetry and music as a tool to gain greater political rights. They are using aspects of traditional Tibetan culture, such as expressing their faith in the Dalai Lama, and love of their homeland. Songs with politically charged lyrics or music videos with images of the Dalai Lama became more widely circulated and known. This upsurge in the public consumption of Tibetan music and poetry has spawned a modern renaissance in art and literature across the plateau. I has been asserted that through these activities, Tibetans are rediscovering "how culture can save politics, instead of politics to save culture".

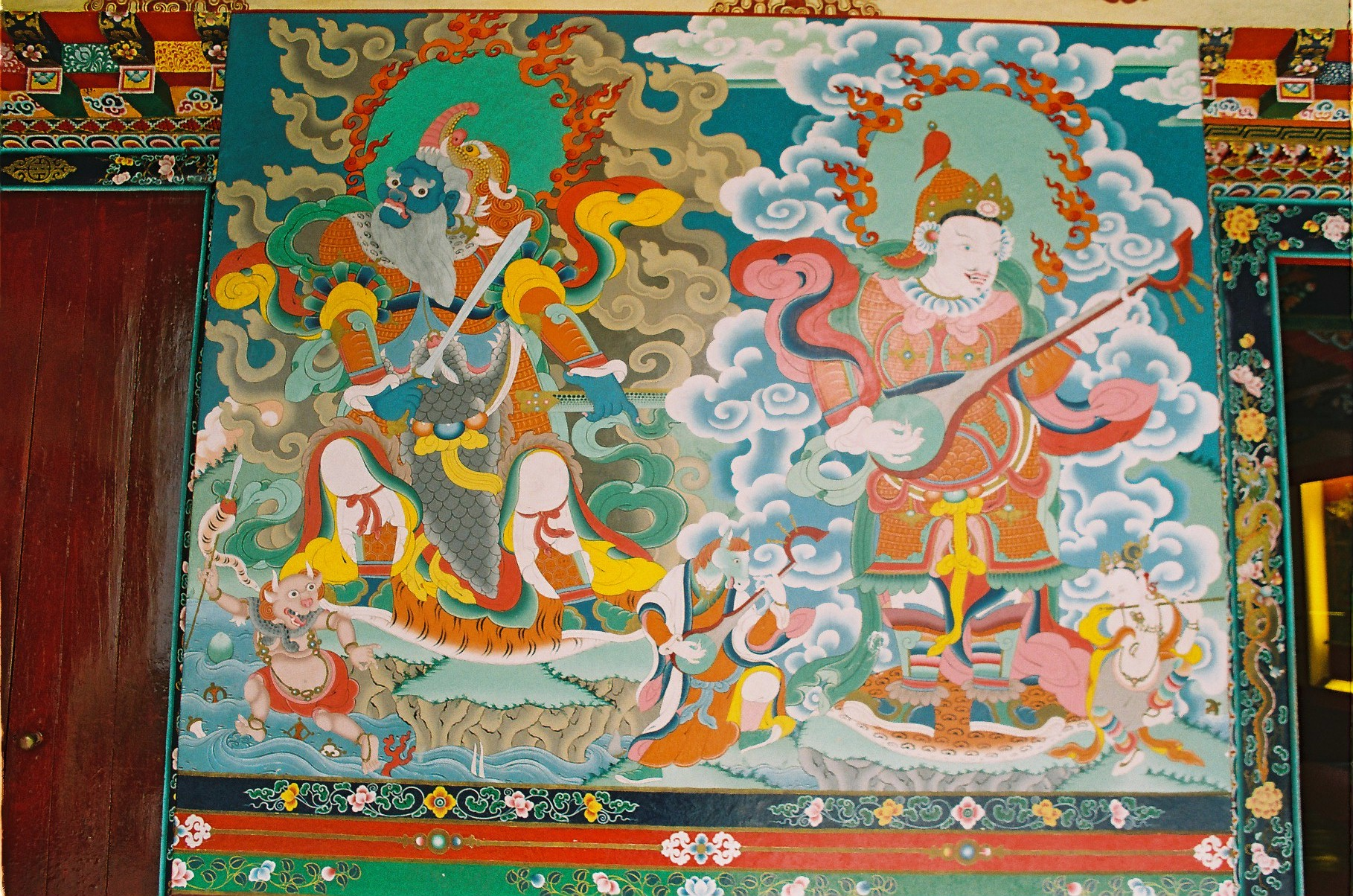
A thangka painting in Sikkim

The Lhakar movement is encouraging the revival of public enthusiasm for studying Tibetan. In various parts of Tibet, elders and children take pledges to speak pure Tibetan, shedding Chinese terms from their vocabulary. Their pledge is as follows:

I am Tibetan, from today I will speak pure Tibetan in my family.
I am Tibetan, from today I will speak pure Tibetan whenever I meet a Tibetan.
I am Tibetan, from today I will remind myself every day that I am a Tibetan till I die.
I am Tibetan, from today I will wear only Tibetan traditional dress, chuba, every Wednesday.
I am Tibetan, from today I will speak only Tibetan every Wednesday.
I am Tibetan, from today I will learn Tibetan language.
I am Tibetan, from today I will stop eating meat and only eat a vegetarian diet and gain more merit every Wednesday.
I am Tibetan, from today I will only use Tibetan and speak Tibetan when I call or send a message to Tibetans.

In Sertha in Kham, elders hand out free dictionaries to youngsters. Writers and musicians in eastern Tibet, many of whom preferred the dominant Chinese language as their artistic medium, now compose and perform in Tibetan. In restaurants and cafes, the owners serve customers only when they order in Tibetan. Weibo users tweet in Tibetan every Wednesday; Renren and Facebook users regularly post images and poems that carry political messages. Social networks contribute to spreading knowledge about Lhakar

Also, the Dalai Lama is one of the creators of The Lhakar Diaries, a blog and Facebook group that chronicles a group of young Tibetans' quest for culture reckoning as they pledge to participate in Lhakar and record their experiences.

=== Non-cooperation ===
Non-cooperation refers to an undeclared and peaceful boycott that Tibetans have used towards Chinese businesses and institutions. This action is inspired by Gandhi's non-cooperation actions during the Indian struggle for independence.

Markham.

Another case of non-violent and non-cooperative action happened in Markham (in eastern Tibet), where Tibetans consider to have won an unprecedented victory in their fight for civil rights. The residents of Markham petitioned and protested against Zhongkhai co's company, claiming that mining operation caused a big loss in the area : poisoning of the local water, deterioration(yaks and sheep began losing their hooves), and death (humans and cattle). Considering the petition unsuccessful, they organized on May 16, 2009, a sitting down. Approximately 500 Tibetans linked arms and sat down blockading the only access road to the mining site. Chinese authorities sent up the police to clear up the situation. They asked the Tibetans to move, announcing they would shoot those who wouldn't disperse. Eventually nothing happened to the Tibetans. On June 8, 2009 the Chinese authorities agreed to cease the mining operation of the company.

No losar.

In 2009, many Tibetans inside and outside Tibet refused to celebrate Losar (the Tibetan new year). Instead they choose a commemorative silence for those killed during the Tibet uprising. Tibetans refused to enjoy and to take part in the celebrations. In some areas (Amdo and Kham), a privately circulated leaflet said:

"During the incidents on March 10, thousands of fellow Tibetans were arrested and sent to prison, thousands of fellow Tibetans suffered from persecution, thousands of fellow Tibetans disappeared; we Tibetans living our quiet and simple lives, if you have a conscience, if you want to live a life sharing joy and sorrows, then we ask you to do the following two things: don’t indulge in singing and enjoyment; don’t light firecrackers or fireworks. Hopefully everyone will be able to follow these two requests, helping us to commemorate the dead and pray for the living!"

Another leaflet content for No Losar stated:

"Brothers and sisters, monks and ordinary people of the three Tibetan provinces (Amdo, U-Tsang and Kham) of the same root and family, we have to unite, resist together, never ever give in to those invading our homeland. The people of the three provinces must stand together through thick and thin, never forget the fellow compatriots that have been shot dead, they did not die for their own benefits but because they fought for freedom and justice. Thus, as Tibetans, we cannot celebrate Losar..."

The local authorities saw the 'No Losar' movement as act of severe separatism and proceeded to make arrests of people considered to be involved. Also, they tried to maintain the celebrations with diverse means, for example by making Tibetans sign papers on which were attested they would not refuse to take part in celebrations for Losar. Despite these measures, since 2009 the movement was repeated annually, including in 2013 when a silent commemoration was held.

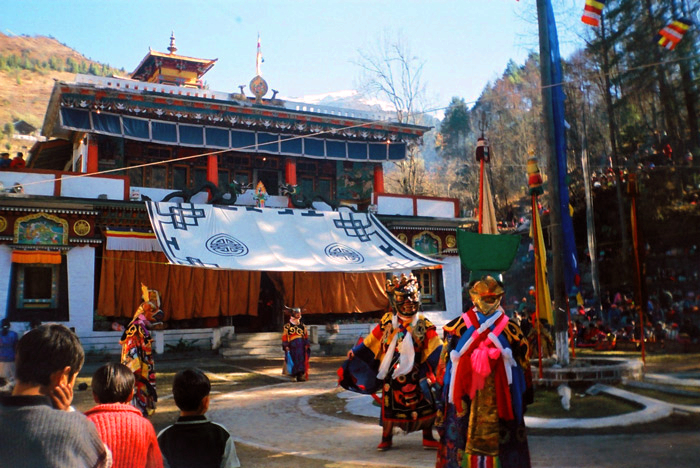
The Gumpa dance being performed in Lachung during the Buddhist festival of Losar

Tibetan poetry: "This Year, No Losar", by Chad med sha, translated by High Peaks Pure Earth:

"Last year was washed by blood, In Lhasa, countless compatriots, were fallen under a piercing arrow"
"this year, no Losar for us, In Sichuan, countless people, buried under the earth"
"This year, no Losar for us, there is only the word “no” on your lips. We are speechless",
"You are filled with anger, we have no bitterness.For the sake of the deceased valiant heroes"
"Let us offer our regrets. For the deceased people, Let us make offerings."
"Therefore, This year, how can Losar be celebrated?Unequivocally! No".
"To celebrate is like a mindless beast. Furthermore an aeroplane crashed against a cliff,"
"This year, no Losar for us a train crashed this year, no Losar for us"
"Even more, it’s endless, Snowstorms covered the high lands, this year, no Losar for us,"
"Drought in the low lands, this year, no Losar for us, Smile covered countenance,"
"A deceitful expression, A sign of a defeat It is a smile of fear"
"Adorned with a smile of happiness, Actually, this is a false smile Covering dishonesty",
"You are thoughtless of the people, you pay no heed to the world"
"Have you looked at the world? You have not tread the modern path,
"Mind is filled with sadness and suffering, therefore, because of our anguish,"
"Let’s not partake in Losar this year."

The vegetable shops. The boycott of the vegetable shops seems to be what best represents the non-cooperation tactic in the lhakar movement.

For many years, Tibetans in Nangchen (Chinese: Nangqen) had been buying vegetables at what they considered as astronomical prices from Chinese grocers. In early 2011, a group of Tibetans started to boycott Chinese vegetable shops, since they stopped buying vegetables in Chinese groceries. Many Tibetans, followed the example, leading Chinese groceries to closure. Another consequence observed was the development of Tibetan vegetable sellers.

More

In Nangchen country, Tibetans have taken diverse Lhakar Pledges resolving to boycott Made-in-China products, Chinese stores and institutions. In some Tibetan restaurants in Zorge, Sichuan province, the orders are only taken in the Tibetan language. Monks in Sershul Monastery, Sichuan province, seeking to protect their mother tongue, prohibit the use of the Chinese language by fining one yuan for every Chinese word said.

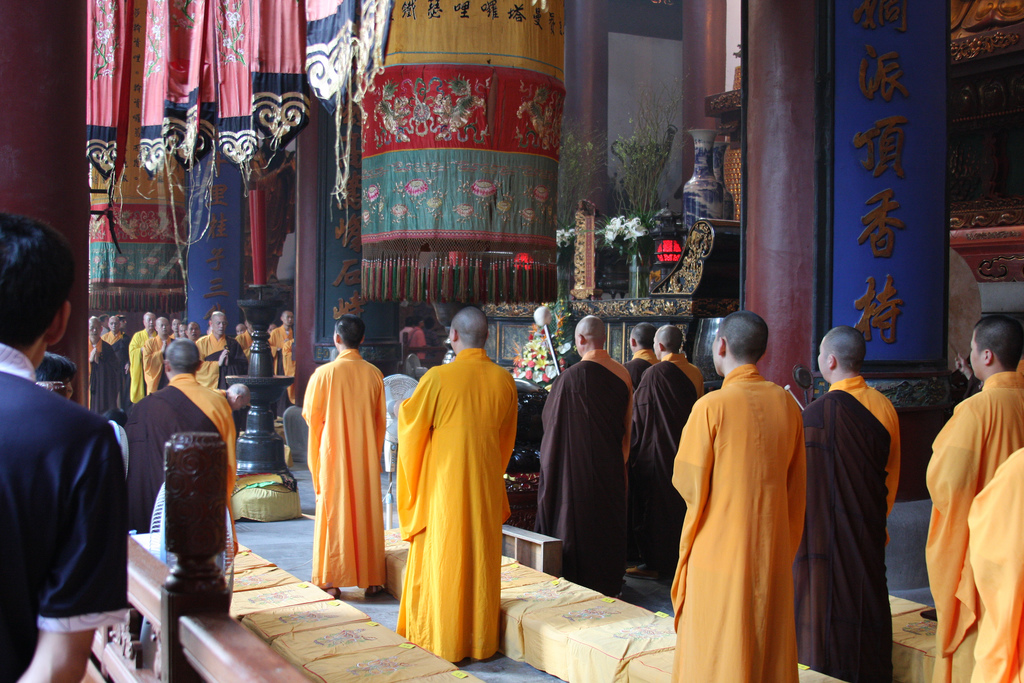
Buddhist monks performing ceremony in Hangzhou, China

=== Lhakar in the future ===
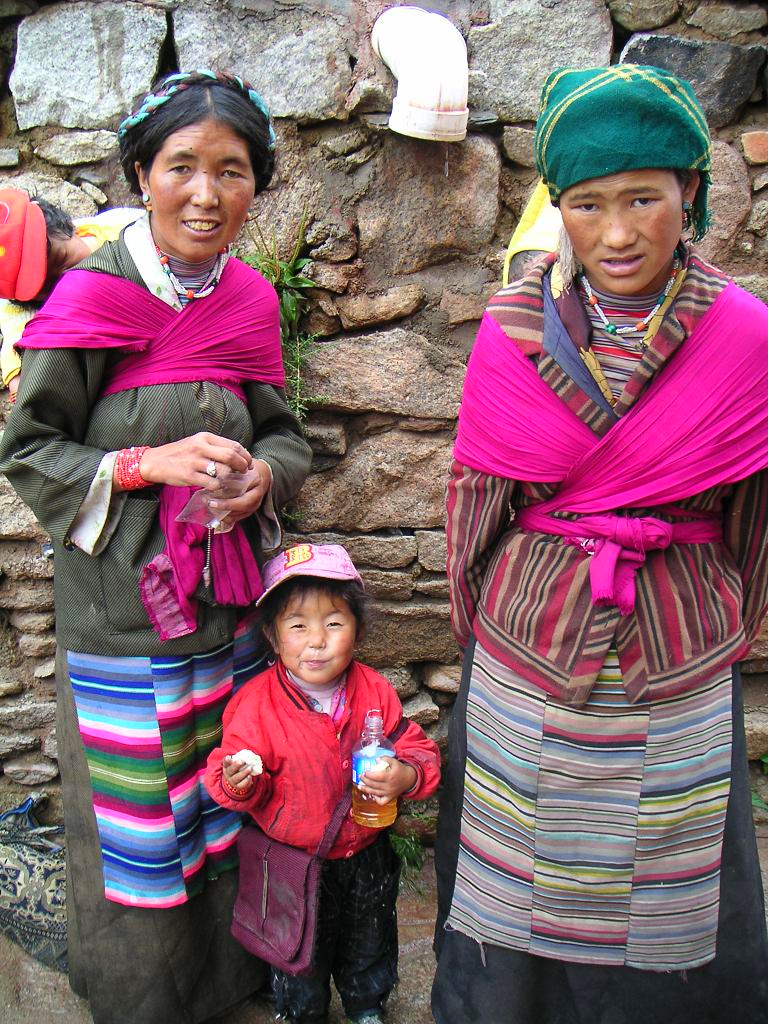
Two women at Drepung Monastery wearing U-Tsang chubas

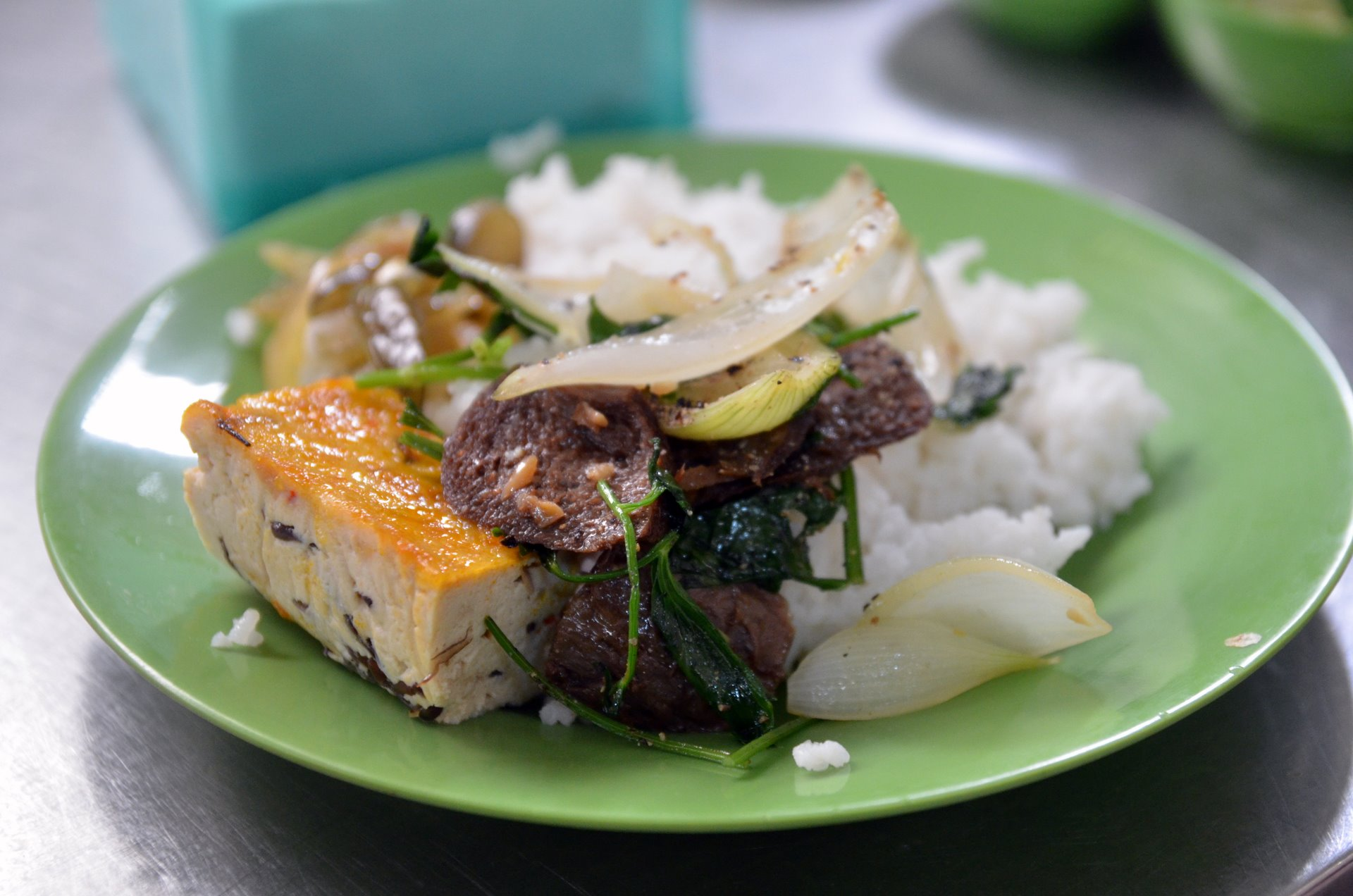
Vegetarian dishes at a Buddhist restaurant in Ho Chi Minh city

From the point of view of its proponents, the Lhakar movement is perceived as a threat by the Chinese authorities. Indeed, given that they would not have control over the actions relating to that movement, they have been subject to accusations of intensified repression inside Tibet, especially on non-violent actions. For example, in Sershul (eastern Tibet) a Tibetan woman was arrested for wearing the chuba (traditional Tibetan dress) on a Wednesday. Also, Tibetans were detained for participating in a preserving language group and others for having promoted vegetarianism (see Buddhist vegetarianism).

However, Tibetan people feel like such actions will not succeed in stopping Lhakar, as Lhakar is a concept. "The essence of Lhakar is not in the chuba one wears but in the intention with which one wears it. The real Lhakar is a movement of the mind, and therefore invisible and untouchable to any number of troops, tanks, or bullets," Tenzin Dorjee said.

Moreover, they believe such reactions from China will strengthen the movement:

"China's heavy-handed crackdown on people speaking Tibetan, wearing certain clothes, or going vegetarian – a reflection of its declining confidence and growing insecurity – will backfire on the regime and end up strengthening Lhakar in the long run," Tenzin Dorjee added.

=== Members ===
Chabdak Lhamo Kyab

Chabdak Lhamo Kyab is a popular Tibetan language professor, deputy of Tibetan's Parliament in Exile, as well as writer and poet. He is also a member of the Tibetan Writers Abroad PEN Centre. Known for his support of Tibetan independence, he has been involved in Tibetan politics since a young age: publishing at least seven works on Tibet, as well as poetry. In June 2012, he gave a conference on the Lhakar movement.

Tenzin Dorjee Tenzin Dorjee is a writer, activist and musician. He is the Executive Director of Students for a Free Tibet, a global grassroots network of students and activists. He is also known for his blog posts on the official Lhakar website, and for being the chair of the Lhakar Awards Committee.

The original design submitted by Zeng Liansong

== China's position ==
According to China, Tibet has never been recognised as an independent state by any government of any country. However the achievement of social and economic progress since the annexation of Tibet by the People's Republic of China, the purpose of the “Tibetan people’s uprising movement” is to create crisis in China by “staging co-ordinated sabotage activities” including self-immolation (more than 130 since 2008) and boycotts. They consider the Dalai Lama as the leader of this movement involving his Dalai clique. China's government feels disappointed in assuring that western media outlets are based on "distorted facts and unfounded claims" and are also ignorant of the obvious truths.

== International actions/support ==
In order to promote the Lhakar movement in exile, there are several external groups supporting the movement. These include the group Students for a Free Tibet.

=== New York Flash Mob to highlight 107 self-immolations in Tibet ===
On August 15, 2008, Tibetans and supporters from New York City joined a flash mob in New York's famous Grand Central Terminal to highlight the staggering number of self-immolations: 107 in total, in protest against Chinese rule. Groups of students, monks, children, businessmen, and activists recently arrived from protesting in Beijing, and ex-political prisoners froze in place mimicking the pose of the iconic Olympic athletes John Carlos and Tommie Smith who shocked the world with their stance of solidarity during the 1968 Olympic Games.

Shortly after the group entered Grand Central Terminal, members of the Tibetan community of New York City and New Jersey dropped a banner reading “One World One Dream Free Tibet” off the two adjacent staircases looking over the Terminal.

=== European Nationalists Unite for Tibet ===
The right of Tibet to be Tibetan was a dominant theme of the European wing of the international Solidarity with Tibet Day, held in early March 2013. Several members of the Flemish Voorpost nationalist organization took a prominent part in the demonstration in Brussels, and were accompanied by nationalists from several other European nations on the day. There were also demonstrations in Copenhagen, Prague, Helsinki, Deggendorf, Berlin, Paris, Hamburg, Budapest, Dublin, Warsaw, Lublin, Lisbon, Bucharest, London, and Edinburgh. The international demonstration was created after the March 1959 crushing of the Tibetan independence movement by the Communist regime in China. The demonstration demanded that the legitimate head of state of Tibet, the Dalai Lama, be returned to his position; that Tibet be given self-determination and that there be respect for human rights and religious freedom in that country.

=== Save Lhasa petition ===
The flag of UNESCO

On June 24–28, 2013, a pledge to protect the cultural heritage of Lhasa was introduced. Over 100,000 people across the world had signed the Save Lhasa petition, urging UNESCO's World Heritage Committee to protect Tibet's capital Lhasa and its cultural heritage, from Chinese construction activities.

Protests also took place outside UNESCO offices in France, New York and New Delhi, demanding UNESCO's World Heritage Committee to include Lhasa in the World Heritage in Danger List. But UNESCO is yet to take any action. Until they meet those demands, pressure is still on.

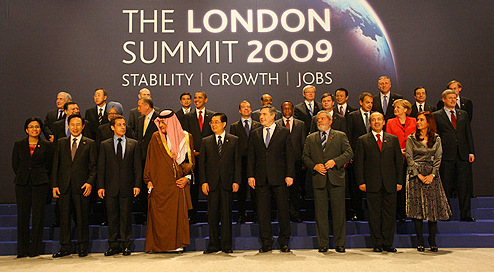
2009 G-20 London summit group photo

=== G20 Summit actions for Tibet ===
Leaders of the G20 countries met in Russia on September 5 and 6, 2013, to discuss international financial and economic issues. To Lhakar, it represented an opportunity to highlight the self-immolation protests in Tibet, and also to persuade the group of world leaders to unite for Tibet. On the eve of the G20 summit, Tibetan NGOs urged G20 leaders to also tackle Xi Jinping about his party's 60-year occupation of Tibet and human rights abuses.
