= Wangchen Tenzin =

Wangchen Tenzin, King of Lingtsang
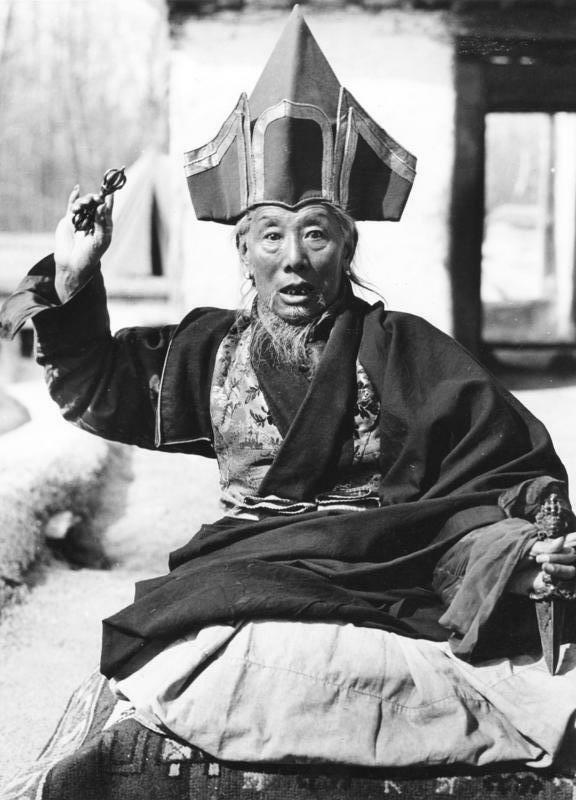
- Lingtsang Gyalpo in 1939 in Lhasa, Mudra of Dorje Phurba (Vajra Kilaya)
- Title: King of Lingtsang

Personal life
- Died: 1942 Dzongri Lingtsang
- Children: 3 sons, 1 daughter (Dechen Tso)
- Notable work(s): Tertön, ngagpa, kīla master
- Other name: Lingtsang Gyalgenma

Religious life
- Religion: Tibetan Buddhism
- School: Nyingma

Senior posting
- Teacher: Jamyang Khyentse Wangpo
- Successor: Phuntsok Gelek Rabten
- Students: Dzongsar Khyentse Chökyi Lodrö

Wangchen Tenzin, King of Lingtsang (Tibetan: གླིང་ཚང་རྒྱལ་པོ་དབང་ཆེན་བསྟན་འཛིན་, Wylie: gling tshang rgyal po dbang chen bstan 'dzin), also Lingtsang Gyalgenma, was the King of Lingtsang in Kham, a tertön, a ngagpa and a kīla master of the Nyingma school of Tibetan Buddhism. He was said to be an incarnation of King Gésar of Ling and was known for his kindness and his siddhis linked to his kīla practice.

He is famous as a tertön for tséyum tsendali, a long-life practice based on Chandali, consort to Amitayus. His master was Jamyang Khyentse Wangpo and he was one of the major teacher of Dzongsar Khyentse Chökyi Lodrö.

He had three sons and one daughter, Dechen Tso, who became the mother of Khandro Tsering Chödrön, one of the foremost female practitioners of Tibetan Buddhism.

Lingtsang Gyalpo died in Dzongri Lingtsang in 1942, and his King (Gyalpo) title was passed to his son Phuntsok Gelek Rabten, a monk, who died in Kalimpong. Phuntsok Gelek Rabten had 5 children, among whom 2 are still alive, a son, Sey Jigme, living in Chengdu and a daughter in Dehradun.

Lingtsang Gyalpo is the great-grandfather of Sogyal Rinpoche.
