= Matthias Hermanns =

German Tibetologist (1899–1972)

P. Matthias Hermanns (31 May 1899 – 5 January 1972) was a missionary of the SVD and a German Tibetologist.

== Biography ==
Matthias Hermanns was born in Köln-Niehl on 31 May 1899. He undertook studies in a gymnasium run by the Society of the Divine Word on moving to Holland in 1914. In 1917, three years into World War I he was trained as a pilot and stationed in Lübeck, and, at war's end resumed his humanistic studies at Steyl, graduating in 1921. He entered the order of the Society of the Divine Word (abbreviated to SVD on the basis of the Latin Societas Verbi Divini) to study for the priesthood at St.Gabriel's in Mödling, and was ordained in 1928. The following year he moved to China to study Chinese at the Steyl academy in western Shandong, and in 1934 undertook a course in Tibetan under a Muslim linguist.

The SVD was a German-Dutch Catholic congregation which managed to send some 90 missionaries into the Gansu, Qinghai and Xinjiang provinces of north-west China between 1922 and 1953, where they established some thirty missions. Together with Dominik Schröder and Johan Frick, he was one of the SVD missionaries who took a lively interest in ethnology, an activity which was supported by the congregation. He had also received sufficient medical training to help the local population with their ailments and illnesses, a factor which helped him, and other missionaries in the group, to earn the confidence and respect of the people among whom they conducted their evangelical work. The principal area of his research was the Kokonor area of the Amdo (as Tibetans call it) region, the present-day Chinese province of Qinghai, and in particular the nomadic herders. His medical assistance provided him with an excellent opportunity to study both the social position of Tibetan women and acquaint himself with the intimate side of their lives.

After the Communist victory in China he could no longer return to Tibet, and spent some time in Europe before taking up a position in India, where he pursued his researches in Nepal. He finally returned to Europe in 1960, with a teaching position at a Steyler Institute in Munich until retiring from the post in 1968. He spent the last four years of his life at the Anthropos Institute at Sankt Augustin, near Bonn.

Hermanns was present in the area when a child was chosen to become the 14th Dalai Lama and managed to interview him soon after he was nominated to be the reincarnation of the earlier Dalai Lama. Hermanns questioned the child, Chö-phel, in Tibetan without success, but found a ready response when he continued his queries in Chinese. It was the only language, Hermanns added, that was spoken by the child's family.

== Works ==
In a research career that extended over four decades, Hermanns published over twenty books and articles, mainly on the pastoral peoples of the Amdo and their dialects, religion, culture and nomadic way of life. He also published on the Indo-Tibetan populations of the Himalayas.

He also authored a German translation of the Epic of King Gesar, based on manuscripts collected from the Amdo region.

== Bibliography ==
- Matthias Hermanns, Vom Urmenschen zur Hochkultur: Chinas Ursprung und Entwicklung, Missionsdruckerei Yenchowfu, 1935, 316 p.
- Matthias Hermanns, 'Uiguren und ihre neuentdeckten Nachkom-men,' in Anthropos, Bd 35-36 (1940–1944), pp. 78–99 (aussi Paulusdruckerei, 1941, 22 p.)
- Matthias Hermanns, Schöpfungs- und Abstammungsmythen der Tibeter, 1946, 55 p.
- Le mystère autour du Dalaï Lama, 1948
- Matthias Hermanns, Die A mdo Pa-Grosstibeter: Die sozial-wirtschaftlichen Grundlagen der Hirtenkulturen Innerasiens, Freiburg in der Schweiz., 1948, 325 p.
- Matthias Hermanns, Ueberlieferungen der Tibeter nach einem Manuskript aus dem Anfang des 13. Jahrh. n. Chr, 1948
- Matthias Hermanns, Die Nomaden von Tibet. Die Sozial-Wirtschaftlichen Grundlagen der Hirtenkulturen in A mdo und von Innerasien. Ursprung und Entwicklung der Viehzucht, Herold, Wien, 1949, 325 p.
- Matthias Hermanns, 'Tibetan Lamaism up to the Time of the Reform by Tzon kha pa,' in The Journal of the Anthropological Society of Bombay, new series, vol. 5, 1951, no. 2, pp. 7–36.
- Matthias Hermanns, Tibetische Dialekte von A mdo, in Anthropos, 47 (1952), pp. 193–202 (aussi Paulusdruckerei, 1952, 10 p.)
- Matthias Hermanns, The Status of Woman in Tibet, in Anthropological Quarterly, vol. 26, No. 3, July 1953
- Matthias Hermanns, The Indo-Tibetans: The Indo-Tibetan and Mongoloid Problem in the Southern Himalaya and North-Northeast India (vol. 11 of Human Relations Area Files: Lepcha), K. L. Fernandes, Bombay, 1954, xvi + 159 p.
- Matthias Hermanns, The evolution of man: a challenge to Darwinism through human biogenetics, physical and cultural anthropology, prehistory, and palaeontology, Society of St. Paul, 1955, 139 p.
- Matthias Hermanns, Himmelstier und Gletscherlöwe: Mythen, Sagen und Fabeln aus Tibet, 1955, 259 p.
- Matthias Hermanns, Mythen und Mysterien. Magie und Religion der Tibeter, Cologne, B. Pick, 1956, 400 p.
- Matthias Hermanns, The A Mdo Pa greater Tibetans: the socio-economic bases of the pastoral cultures of Inner Asia (Human Relations Area Files), 1956, 354 p.
- Matthias Hermanns, Madhya Pradesh (Christian Missionary Activities Enquiry Committee), Hinduism and tribal culture: an anthropological verdict on the Niyogi Report, K. L. Fernandes, 1957, 59 p.
- Matthias Hermanns, Die Familie der A mdo-Tibeter, Freiburg, Karl Alber, 1959, 403 p.
- Christoph von Fürer-Haimendorf, Matthias Hermanns, Die Religiös-Magischen Weltanschauung der Primitivstämme Indiens, Band I, Die Bhagoria Bhil, Franz Steiner Verlag, Wiesbaden, 1964, XI-543 p., 26 pl.
- Matthias Hermanns, Das National-Epos der Tibeter Gling König Ge Sar, Verlag Josef Habbel, Regensburg, 1965, 962 p.
- Matthias Hermanns, Die Religiös-Magischen Weltanschauung der Primitivstämme Indiens, Band II, Die Bhilala, Korku, Gond, Baiga, Franz Steiner, Wiesbaden, 1966, 571 p.
- Matthias Hermanns, Schamanen, Pseudoschamanen, Erlöser und Heilbringer: Eine vergleichende Studie religiÖser Urphänomene, 3 vol., Franz Steiner Verlag, Wiesbaden, 1970, 1291 p. (vol. I: Schamanen, xxii + 705 p.; vol. II: Pseudoschamanen, ix + 346 p.; vol. III: Erlöser and Heilbringer der Tibeter, ix + 240 p.)
- Matthias Hermanns, Der Mensch: Woher, wohin?, Verlag Bonifacius-Druckerei, 1971, 282 p.
- Matthias Hermanns, Die Oraon, F. Steiner, 1973, 420 p.
- Matthias Hermanns, Mythologie der Tibeter: Magie, Religion, Mysterien (réimpression de Mythen und Mysterien. Magie und Religion der Tibeter, 1956), Phaidon Verlag, Essen, 1997

== See also ==
- Christianity in Qinghai
- Christianity in Xinjiang
- Catholic Church in Tibet

== Notes and references ==
=== References ===
- Hermanns, Matthias (1948). "Le mystère autour du Dalai Lama". Asiatische Studien: Zeitschrift der Schweizerischen Asiengesellschaft. 2 (3–4): 133–145.
- Hermanns, Matthias (1953). "The Status of Woman in Tibet". Anthropological Quarterly. 26 (3): 67–78. doi:10.2307/3316691. JSTOR 3316691.
- Horlemann, Bianca (2009). "The Divine Word Missionaries in Gansu, Qinghai and Xinjiang, 1922–1953: A Bibliographic Note". Journal of the Royal Asiatic Society of Great Britain & Ireland. 19 (1): 59–82. doi:10.1017/s135618630800905x. JSTOR 27756019. S2CID 162397522.
- Schröder, Dominik (1972). "P. Matthias Hermanns SVD (1899-1972)". Anthropos. 67 (1–2): 1–8. JSTOR 40458012.
