= Sershul Triwa Rinpoche =

Sershul Tripa Rinpoche

== Sershul Tripa Rinpoche ==
Sershul Tripa Rinpoche Thupten Nyandak Choekyi Gyaltsen is the acting head of ZaChukha_Sershul_Monastery Sershul Monastery, in Sershul County (Dhokham ZaChuka) in Eastern Tibet. Born in 1966, Kyabje Tripa Rinpoche is also known as the Eighth Bön Tsang Triwa, (in pinyin, Tubudan Quejijianzan Rinpoche.)

According to Buddhist Tripa Rinpoche is the incarnation of Dharmakaya Samantabhadra (the Bodhisattva representing universal wisdom) and is also the incarnation of one of the eight main disciples of Lama Tsongkapa, a combination that is extremely rare in the Tibetan Buddhist system of incarnation.

The Eighth Bön Tsang Rinpoche was born on 18 June 1966 in Sershul (Shiqu) County, on the bank of the Zachu River (“Dza Chu” in Tibetan). At the age of 16, Tripa Rinpoche received the vow of a novice monk from Khenpo Thubten Wangpo, the incarnation of Dega Chögyel Tenpa Tsering.

Sershul Triwa Rinpoche first joined at Changma Monastery, in Sershul County, near his birthplace. At the age of 18 he was recognized by several important tulkus as the incarnation of the Seventh Bön Tsang tulku of Sershul Monastery, of the Gelug school. The next year he took charge as the thirty seventh abbot of Sershul Monastery and was put in charge of the educational administration of more than 60 subsidiary monasteries. At the age of 20, he received his full ordination from Khenpo Thubten Wangpo. In 1995, the Administration of the Ganzi Prefecture officially issued him with a certificate to recognize his incarnation and held an enthronement ceremony in his honour.

Sershul Triwa Rinpoche's Gelug lamas are the Dalai Lama, the 10th Panchen Lama, Gongtang Rinpoche, Thubten Wangpo, Dorje Chang Lobzang Tenzin, Dorje Chang Ngawang La Ong, Tashi Yondzin Rinpoche, Dorje Chang Gendün Gyamtso Rinpoche, Ngawang Dadrak Rinpoche, Tendzin Setsang Lobzang Palden Rinpoche, Dorje Chang Dampa Zangpo and Lhamo Yondzin Rinpoche. His Nyingma masters are Khempo Jigme Phuntsok, Khenpo Chöyang Chabdhar, Dzagyel Khempo Bumpa, Khempo Karzang Khedrup and Khempo Pema Wangyal. His Kagyu lamas are Orgyen Tulku Rinpoche, and many others.

Sershul Triwa Rinpoche has always held a non-sectarian view, also called the Rime movement, and has a deep respect for all traditions and lamas from all schools of Tibetan Buddhism.

Tripa Rinpoche has more than 10'000 Chinese students in Beijing, Shanghai, Guangzhong, Chengdu, etc. And tens of thousands in Tibet.

== Sershul Monastery ==
Sershul Monastery is situated on the Tibetan plateau at an elevation of 4,000 meters where the borders of Qinghai, Tibet Autonomous Region and Sichuan meet. Sershul is the largest Gelugpa monastery in the Tibetan Kham region and has the only Buddhist Monastic University in the Kham region that is qualified to teach and bestow the highest Tibetan Buddhist geshe degree.

Home to 1300 monks, Sershul Monastery is the largest Gelug monastery in Kham, and the religious center of Zachukha (or Sershul) County—the highest, largest, poorest, coldest, and most remote county in Sichuan Province.

It has six existing temples, most of which are fairly well preserved since before 1949. The largest temple, which is more than 300 years old, contains two great chanting halls devoted to Je Tsongkhapa, founder of the Gelug Order. It also contains many precious relics including one of Je Tsongkhapa's teeth preserved within a sacred choeten (stupa) in the upper gallery. Sershul Monastery was established in 1701 and to date has kept a collection of rare sacred Buddhist objects, like the wooden block and hammer used during the initiation and penance ceremonies of monks at the Nalanda University in India at the time of Shakyamuni Buddha – some of the objects having a history of more than 2,000 years. The monastery also has many valuable sacred relics left by eminent monks after their deaths. Examples are for instance when Thinley Norbu lama died in 1995, a mark was left on his skull in the image Vajrapani. In 1997 when Triwa Lobsang lama died, an image of Arya Tara was left on his heart.

== Rinpoche's activities ==
The monastery, under the guidance of Triwa Rinpoche, is managed in an orderly manner, with strict religious discipline and rigorous religious practice. A large number of monks want to join the monastery and today there are several monks who are in silent retreat. In July 2005, students of the Buddhist Monastic University of the Sershul Monastery obtained the first four places in the National Examination for Higher Tibetan Buddhist Institutes in China.

In 2006, The monastery established a Hospital of Traditional Tibetan medicine, In 2012 completely a Tibetan Old Age Home, the Menshul Charity, an orphanage with a technical school is learning home of 750 students approximately, even running very well. In this way the monastery solved some substantial social problems for the local government administration and brought hope for the local Tibetans.

A grand new temple devoted to Amitābha, a Tibetan medicine hospital, a guest house, and a primary school for local children were built. The Amitābha Temple, Retreat House, and guest house opened in 2000 in a tremendous celebration that was attended by thousands of guests.

== Recent activities ==
In December 2008, Triwa Rinpoche and the monks of Sershul Monastery participated in a community film initiative, organized by the Kham Film Project.

In 2009, Triwa Rinpoche was invited by Rigdzin Namkha Gyatso Rinpoche and Tromthog Rinpoche to visit Europe. During this first visit in Europe, Triwa Rinpoche visited and taught hundreds of students at the Rigdzin Community in Switzerland, Dzogchen Ling in the Netherlands and Chokhor Ling in Spain, as well as Rigpa's Lerab Ling at the request of Sogyal Rinpoche.
