= Kingdom of Lingtsang =

Former kingdom in Tibet

Kingdom of Lingtsang གླིང་ཚང
- c. 11th century–1959
- Capital: Gusi (in present day Gusi Township, Dêgê County, Sichuan)
- Common languages: rGyalrong languages
- Government: Monarchy
- Lingtsang Gyalpo
  - ?–1942: Wangchen Tenzin
  - 1942–1959: Phuntsok Gelek Rabten
- History
  - Established: c. 11th century
  - Annexed by Qing China: 1910
  - Restored: 1918
  - incorporated into PR China: 1950
  - Land Reform Movement: 1959
Succeeded by
China
- Today part of: China

Lingtsang (Tibetan: གླིང་ཚང, Wylie: gling tshang; Chinese: 林蔥) was formerly one of the Kham region's five independent kingdoms of Tibet. The realm of Lingstang was incorporated into the People's Republic of China in 1950 following the Battle of Chamdo.

== Geography ==
The Kingdom of Lingtsang was centred around the eponymous region of Ling or Lingtsang, in the Tibetan region of Kham, though its exact extent is unknown. The region of Lingtsang is located north of Derge, along the upper reaches of the Yangtze River (known as "Dri Chu" in Tibetan); it makes up the southern portion of today's Sêrxü County.

== History ==
The region of Lingtsang first rose to prominence during the era of the Tibetan Empire, where the capital at that time, Denkok (Wylie: ’dan khog) was the centre of Kham's population and cultural activity. After the collapse of the Tibetan Empire, Lingtsang next rose to prominence under the Sakya domination of Tibet; however, the semi-legendary King Gesar is also supposed to have been a ruler of Ling (an alternative name for Lingtsang), and in 1216, forces of the kingdom apparently looted the monastery of Tshurbu, which was located near Lhasa. Additionally, the later ruling family of Lingtsang claimed descent from Gesar's half-brother.

At this point, a monk and head of the local dynasty was given overlordship over the district of Domé (modern Amdo), and Sakya administrators were located at Lingtsang. After the end of Sakya dominion in Tibet, Lingtsang became an independent kingdom. The Ming Dynasty opened diplomatic relations with the kingdom of Lingtsang in the early 15th century to ensure the safety of caravans entering Tibet through Kham; as part of this move, the ruler was granted the honors of "State Master of Consecration" (Chinese: 灌顶国师; pinyin: Guàndǐng Guóshī) and "Religious King of Promoting Goodness" (Chinese: 赞善教王; pinyin: Zànshàn Jiāowáng).

By the 1600s, Lingtsang had become powerful enough to exercise control over the rival kingdom of Derge; however Derge became increasingly powerful starting from around 1630. This was at Lingtsang 's expense, which meant that from 1700 onwards, Lingtsang was a small and unimportant state on the border of Derge. During the Qing rule of Tibet, Lingtsang's leaders (who were no longer monks) were assigned the status of tusi. The kingdom came to an end when the province of Sichuan instituted Chinese rule in 1909; it became part of Derge. Along with the rest of Tibet, it gained independence in the chaos following Qing collapse, and came under Communist rule following the Chinese occupation of Tibet.

== See also ==
- Kham
- Lingtsang Gyalpo
