= Dominik Schröder =

Dominik Schröder (4 September 1910 – 25 December 1974) was an ethnologist whose researches were focused mainly in the Moungor (Tu) people of Northwest China. He was born in Eiweiler, in the Nohfelden municipality of the Saarland. He worked as a missionary in China from 1938 to 1949. He obtained an MA from Fujen University in Beijing in 1945.

He was active in the Anthropos-Institut in Fribourg, and undertook research on the Kham people, and the oral poetry of the Monguor people (蒙古尔). He translated the chapter on Folklore from the Xīkāng Tújīng (西康圖經:1934), a work by the Chinese scholar Rén Nǎiqiáng (任乃強) who pioneered studies on the Gesar epic. From 1946 to 1949 he resided among the Huzhu Monguor people. He returned to Europe in 1949 to pursue his studies in anthropology at both Fribourg and Frankfurt, and obtained a doctorate in 1951. His inaugural dissertation, "Zur Religion der Tujen des Sininggebietes (Kukunor)," published in 1953 was an important addition to a little-known field of ethnology.

He was appointed professor of ethnology at Nanzan University in Nagoya in 1960, a position he held until 1969. While in Japan, he made several trips to Taiwan to conduct fieldwork among the shamanizing ‘poringao’ women of the aboriginal Puyuma people. His research notes were edited and published posthumously by Anton Quack.

His particular area of research interest was the phenomenon of shamanism among the peoples of East Asia. He collected invaluable materials on the Gesar epic as conserved among the Monguor.

== Publications ==
- 'Zur Religion der Tuen des Sininggebietes (KuKunor)', in Anthropos: Internationale Zeitschrift für Völker- und Sprachenkunde, Sonderdruck, Band 47, 1952; Paulusdruckerei, Freiburg in der Schweiz.
- 'Zur Struktur des Schamanismus,' in Anthropos, Vol. 50, 1955, pp. 849–881.
- Aus der Volksdichtung der Monguor. I. Teil: Das weiße Glücksschaf (Mythen, Märchen, Lieder), Asiatische Forschungen, Band 6, Wiesbaden, Otto Harrassowitz 1959.
- Aus der Volksdichtung der Monguor. 2. Teil: In den Tagen der Urzeit. (Ein Mythus vom Licht und vom Leben), Aufgenommen und übersetzt von Dominik Schröder. Hrsg. Walther Heissig, Asiatische Forschungen, Band 31. Otto Harrassowitz, Wiesbaden 1970.
- With Anton Quack, 'Kopfjagdriten der Puyuma von Katipol (Taiwan) : eine Textdokumentation,' in Collectanea Instituti Anthropos; Bd. 11, St. Augustin : Anthropos-Institut : Haus Volker und Kulturen, 1979
- Anton Quack, Priesterinnen, Heilerinnen, Schamainnen? Die Poringao der Puyuma von Katipol (Taiwan= dargestellt und analysiert nach Aufzeichnungen aus dem Nachless von D. Schröder, Dietrich Reimer Verlag, Berlin 1985 (Collectanea Instituti Anthropos 32)

== Secondary Literature ==
- Walther Heissig: Geser Redzia-wu. Dominik Schröders nachgelassene Monguor(Tujen)-Version des Geser-Epos aus Amdo. (Asiatische Forschungen, Band 70) Wiesbaden 1980, ISBN 3-447-02090-3
- Dominik. Schröder by A. Burgmann, 'P. Dominik Schröder SVD (1910–1974)', Anthropos 70 (1975), pp. 1–4
- Harald Grauer (2012). "Schröder, Dominik". In Bautz, Traugott (ed.). Biographisch-Bibliographisches Kirchenlexikon (BBKL) (in German). Vol. 33. Nordhausen: Bautz. ISBN 978-3-88309-690-2.
