= Gsumge Mani Stone Castle =

General information
- Location: Sêrxü, China
- Construction started: Pre-Peman period: probably 11th–12th centuries; post-Peman period: 18th century; according to local tradition: around 10th century.

Height
- Height: 15 m (49 ft)

Dimensions
- Diameter: 73 m × 47 m (240 ft × 154 ft)

Technical details
- Material: Stone

The Gsumge Mani Stone Castle, or Songge Mani-Sutra City (traditional Chinese: 松格瑪尼石經城; simplified Chinese: 松格玛尼石经城; pinyin: Sōnggé mǎní shíjīngchéng; lit. 'Gsumge Mani Stone Sutra City'; also referred to as 松格嘛呢石經城 / 松格嘛呢石经城) is a massive complex built out of Tibetan mani stone tablets located in the Zachukha Grasslands, Sêrxü, Sichuan.

== Etymology ==
The place where the castle is located is known as Gsum (松) in Tibetan, ge (格) is a modal particle.

== The building ==
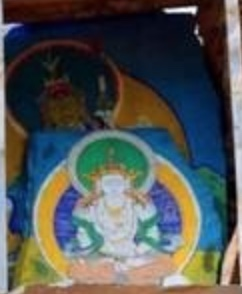
Painting of a Buddhist deity in a niche.

The rectangular castle is facing south, measuring 73 metres long and 47 metres wide. The height of the outer wall is about 9 metres, and the highest point of the castle is 15 metres. It is built in the structure of a mandala, without any supporting frames and construction adhesives. The outer walls are covered with rows of niches that look like countless "windows". Most of the niches are filled with exquisitely carved stone statues and paintings of Buddhist deities. The interior is structured like a maze of corridors. A shrine dedicated to King Gesar and his thirty generals is located at the centre of the castle.

According to an excavation report by the local government, half of the castle had sunk into the soil. The excavation yielded numerous mani stones inscribed with Sanskrit mantras dating back to the 11th and 12th centuries.

== History ==
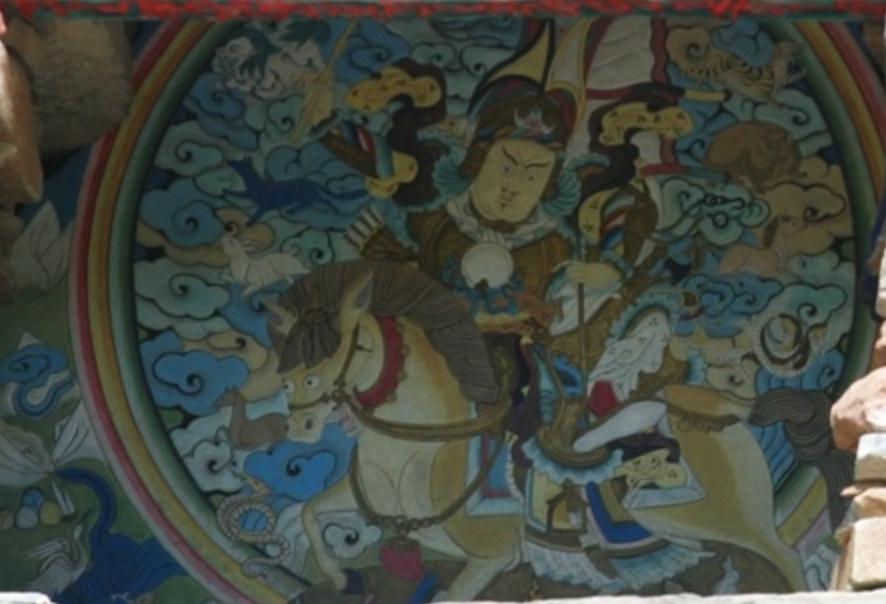
King Gesar is the central figure of this shrine complex, a painting dedicated to him in a niche.

According to the local tradition, the Gsumge Mani Stone Castle dates back to the time of the legendary King Gesar. Around the 10th century, Nomzida and Ronchamale, two of Gesar's generals, along with a large number of soldiers, died in the battle of Hor-Ling due to the betrayal of Gesar's uncle Khrothung. As a gesture of repentance, Khrothung built a stupa and piled up mani stones around it. In the 18th century, the stupa and mani stone piles were discovered by Pema Rinchen (白馬仁欽), founder of the Pukang Temple (菩康寺 or 普康寺) at Sêrxü. He vowed to build a "city made of mani stones", which gradually became the Gsumge Mani Stone Castle. The castle's history can thus be divided into pre-Peman and post-Peman periods.

== See also ==
- Kham
- Vajrayana
- Sershul Monastery
