= August Hermann Francke (Tibetologist) =

German Tibetologist

To be distinguished from his ancestor of the same name, August Hermann Francke.

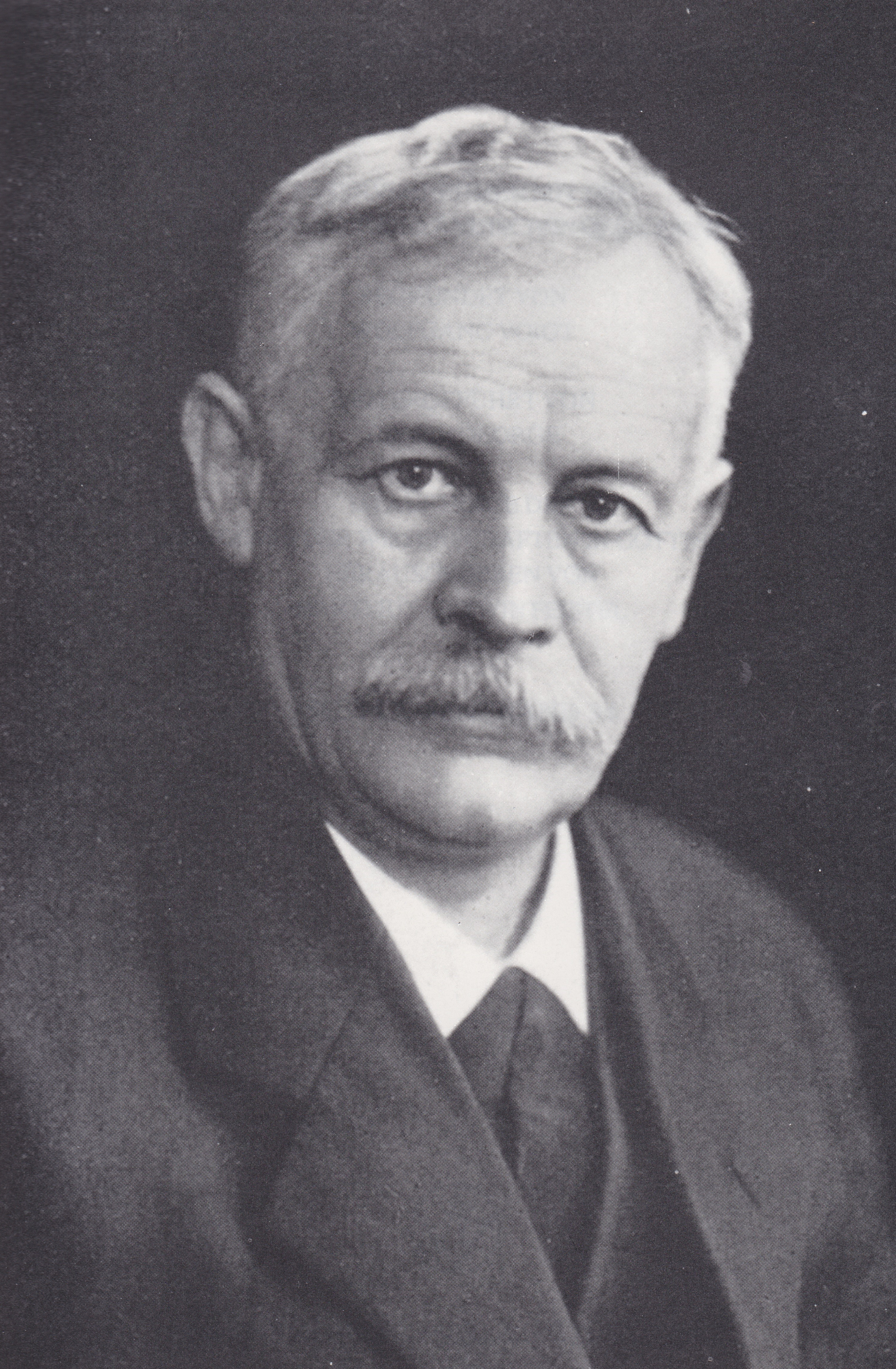
August Hermann Francke

August Hermann Francke (5 November 1870 in Gnadenfrei, Silesia – 16 February 1930 in Berlin) was a German Tibetologist. He worked in Ladakh and Lahul from 1896 to 1908 and published the Ladakh chronicles (La dvags rgyal rabs) with an English translation. He served as the first professor of Tibetan at the Berlin University.

== Family and early life ==
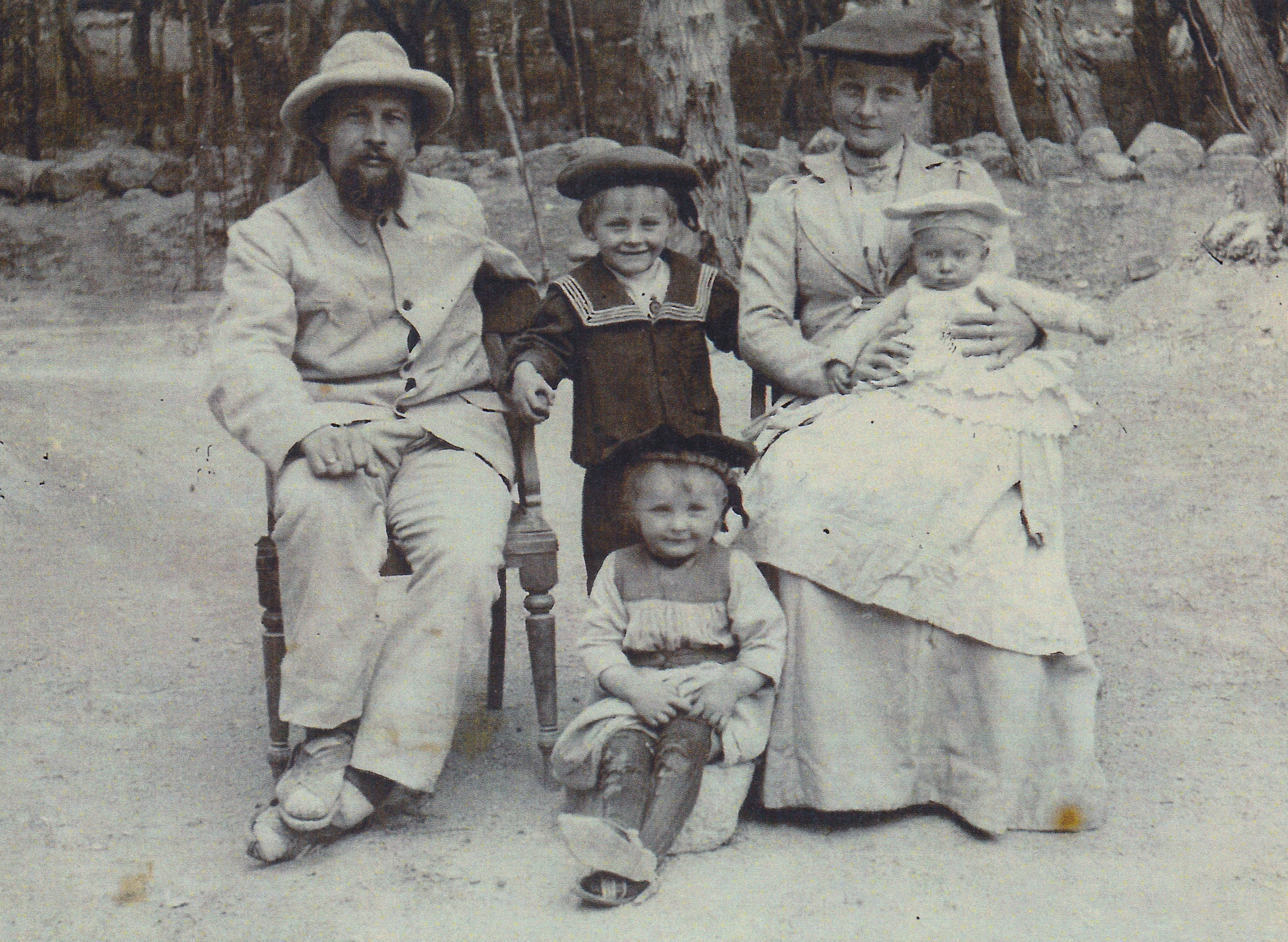
Family of August Hermann Francke (c. 1905): August Hermann Francke Jr., Walter Dondrub Francke, Anna Theodora Francke, Hilde Francke

Francke's grandfather was Christian Friedrich Francke, a descendant of the 18th-century theologian August Hermann Francke (1663–1727), after whom August was named. He married Anna Theodora Weize (b. 1875 Silo, South Africa) whom he met in Kleinwelka, Saxony. Before they married she went to Amritsar for a year to improve her English as a teacher. August Hermann joined her in India and married her there in 1897.

== Career ==
Francke served as a Moravian Church missionary in Ladakh, then a part of the princely state of Jammu and Kashmir, from 1896 until 1909. His return to Europe was occasioned by his wife's illness. He was subsequently appointed professor of Tibetan languages at Berlin University. His students included Walter Simon.

After Yoseb Gergan produced the first draft of the Tibetan Bible in 1910, Francke corrected it and then sent it to David Macdonald, the British trade agent in Yatung. Also involved was his Moravian colleague Heinrich Jäschke who produced A Tibetan-English dictionary.

== Works ==
=== Books ===
- A History of Western Tibet: One of the unknown empires (London, 1907).
- Antiquities of Indian Tibet - Vol. 1: Personal narrative of a journey in 1910 from Simla to Srinagar; through Kinnaur, Spiti and Ladakh. For the express purpose of investigating the Buddhist Antiquities (Calcutta, 1914).
- Antiquities of Indian Tibet - Vol. 2: The Chronicles of Ladakh and Minor Chronicles (Calcutta, 1926).
- First collection of Tibetan historical inscriptions on rock and stone from Ladakh Himalaya (edited by Prem Singh Jina). Delhi: Sri Satguru, 2003. ISBN 9788170307662

=== Articles ===
- A Sketch of Ladakhi Grammar Journal of the Royal Asiatic Society of Bengal 70.1, 1901.
- Tibetische Geschichtsforschung und was man dabei erleben kann, 1911
- Tibetan Grammar
- "Historical Documents from the Border of Tibet." In Annual Report of the Archaeological Survey of India 1909–1910. Edited by J. Marshall, Calcutta: Government of India Press, 1914. pp. 104–112.
- “The Tibetan Alphabet.” Epigraphia Indica 11 (1911): 266–273.
- “gZer-Myig, A Book of the Tibetan Bonpos, Books 1-3.” (1924) Asia Major 1.1, pp. 243-346.
- “gZer-Myig, A Book of the Tibetan Bonpos, Book 4.” (1926) Asia Major 3.1, pp. 321-339.
- “gZer-Myig, A Book of the Tibetan Bonpos, Book 5.” (1927) Asia Major 4.1, pp. 161-239.
- “gZer-Myig, A Book of the Tibetan Bonpos, Book 6.” (1930a) Asia Major 5.1, pp. 1-40.
- “gZer-Myig, A Book of the Tibetan Bonpos, Books 7.” (1930b) Asia Major 6.1, pp. 299-314.
- “gZer-Myig, A Book of the Tibetan Bonpos, Books 8.” (1949) Asia Major 1.2, pp. 163-188.
