= Epic of King Gesar =

East and Central Asian epic cycle

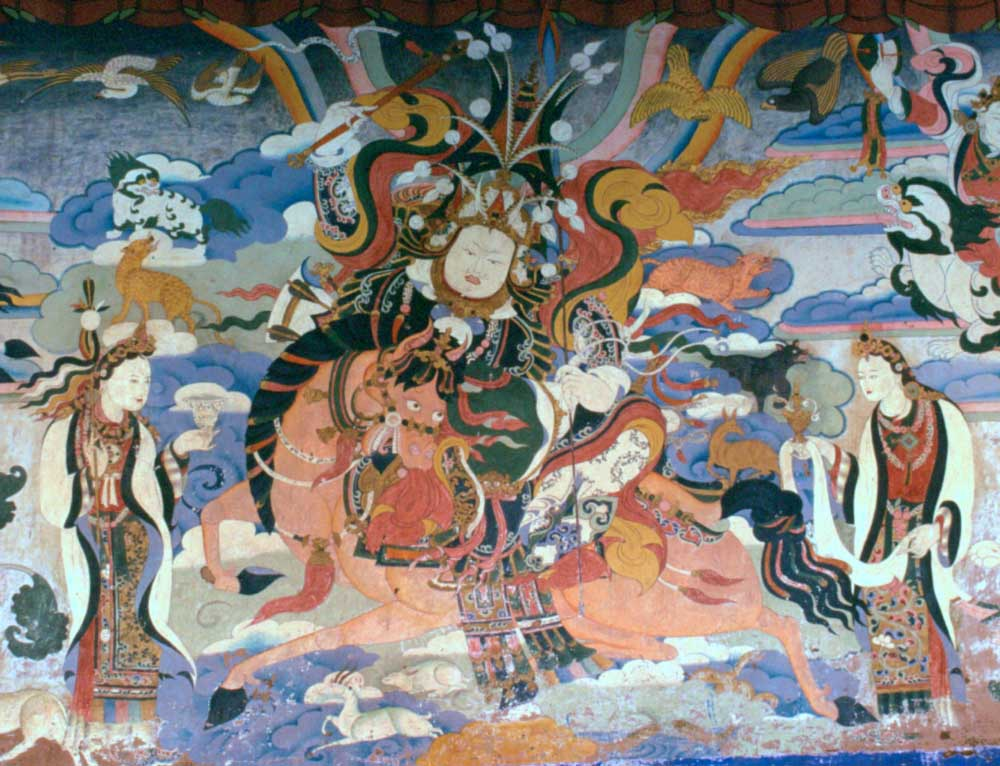
Mural depicting Gesar

The Epic of King Gesar (Tibetan: གླིང་གེ་སར།, Wylie: gling ge sar), also spelled Kesar (/ˈkɛzər, ˈkɛs-/) or Geser (especially in Mongolian contexts), is a traditional epic originating from Tibet and Central Asia. Folk balladeers continued to transmit the story orally over time. The narrative reached its "final" form and peak popularity in the early 12th century.

The epic recounts the heroic deeds of the culture hero Gesar, the fearless lord of the legendary kingdom of Ling (Wylie: gling). It is preserved in both poetry and prose, primarily through oral poetic performance, and is widely sung across Central Asia and South Asia. Its classic version originates in central Tibet.

Approximately 100 bards of this epic (Wylie: sgrung, "tale") remain active today in the Gesar belt of China. Tibetan, Mongolian, Buryat, Balti, Ladakhi, and Monguor singers continue to uphold the oral tradition, and the epic has drawn significant scholarly interest as one of the few surviving oral epic traditions still performed as a living art. Versions of the epic among the Yugur and Salar peoples have also been recorded among the Balti of Baltistan, the Burusho people of Hunza and Gilgit, and the Kalmyk and Ladakhi people in Nepal, and various Altai, Turkic, and Tungus tribes. The first printed version was a Mongolian text published in Beijing in 1716.

There are numerous versions of the epic, each with many variants, and some sources regard it as the longest in the world. Although no single definitive text exists, the Chinese compilation of Tibetan versions has so far filled approximately 120 volumes, comprising more than one million verses divided into 29 “chapters.” Western estimates refer to more than 50 distinct editions published to date in China, India, and Tibet.

== Etymology of the title ==
It has been proposed on the basis of phonetic similarities that the name Gesar reflects the Roman title Caesar, and that the intermediary for the transmission of this imperial title from Rome to Tibet may have been a Turkic language, since kaiser (emperor) entered Turkic through contact with the Byzantine Empire, where Caesar (Καῖσαρ) was an imperial title. The medium for this transmission may have been via Mongolian Kesar, from the time when the Mongols were allied with the Byzantines.

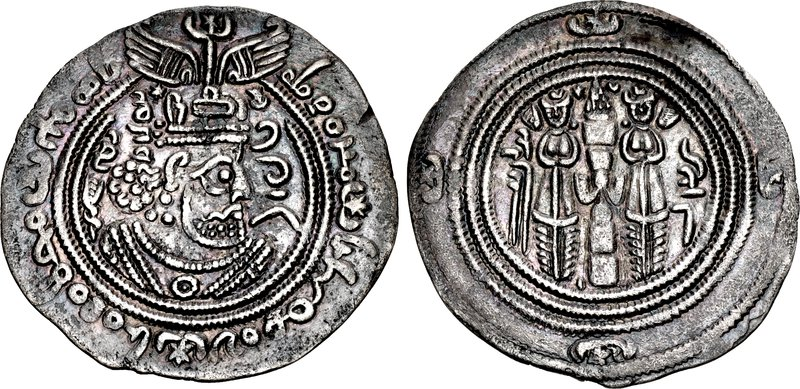
Coin of Fromo Kesaro ("Caesar of Rome"), king of the Turk Shahis, circa 738-745 CE

Numismatic evidence (Note: Vohra 1996, p. 217 writes that these coins with the title Fromo Kesaro appear to refer to the successor of Sahi Tegin (700-738 CE:Chinese:烏散特勤灑: MC:uo-sân d'ɘk-g'iɘn ṣai=*Horsān tegin šāhi 'Tegin, king of Khurasan'), ruler of the Second Turki Śāhi dynasty at Kapisa-Udyana, whose reign was between 738 and 745 C.E., and who is identified with the 'Frōm Kēsar' (拂菻罽婆: Fúlǐn jìpó: North Western Tang pfvyr-lḭum-kḭe-sâ) of the Tang shu. (Harmatta & Litvinsky 1999, pp. 376, 380)) and some accounts speak of a Bactrian ruler Phrom-kesar, specifically the Kabul Shahi of Gandhara, which was ruled by the Turkic king Fromo Kesaro ("Caesar of Rome"), (Note: Martin 2011, p. 127:"He received this laudatory epithet because he, like the Byzantines, was successful at holding back the Muslim conquerors.") who was father-in-law of the king of the Kingdom of Khotan around the middle of the 8th century CE. (Note: Vohra 1996, pp. 216–17 writes that Gesar is mentioned in a Khotan text, the Tibetan Li-yul-lung-bstan-pa, ("Prophecy of the Li Country") of the 9th-10th century, and Phrom long identified with a country northeast of Yarkand. Recent opinion identifies the land either with the Turkic Küūsen or the Kushan territories of Gandhāra and Udayana. Gesar may be either someone of Turkic stock or a non-Tibetan dynastic name. The Khotan king Vijaya Sangrama's consort Hu-rod-ga (Hu-rong-ga) was Phrom Gesar's daughter. The Padma-thang-yig records a Tibetan army subduing Gesar, something also mentioned in the Rygal-po'i-bka'i-than-yig ("Pronouncements concerning Kings").) In early Bon sources, From Kesar is always a place name, and never refers, as it does later, to a ruler. In some Tibetan versions of the epic, a king named Phrom Ge-sar or Khrom Ge-sar figures as one of the kings of the four directions – the name is attested in the 10th century and this Phrom/Khrom preserves an Iranian form (*frōm-hrōm) for Rūm/Rome. This eastern Iranian word lies behind the Middle Chinese word for (Eastern) Rome (拂菻, Fólín), namely Byzantium (phrōm-from<*phywət-lyəm>). (Note: Beyer 1992, pp. 139–40: 'There is an enormous amount of history in the simple fact that the epic hero of Tibet bears a name derived from that of Caesar of Rome.')

A. H. Francke thought the Tibetan name Gesar derived from Sanskrit. S.K. Chatterji, introducing his work, noted that the Ladakh variant of Kesar, Kyesar, in Classical Tibetan Skye-gsar meant 'reborn/newly born', and that Gesar/Kesar in Tibetan, as in Sanskrit signifies the 'anther or pistil of a flower', corresponding to Sanskrit kēsara, whose root 'kēsa' (hair) is Indo-European.

== Gesar and the Kingdom of Ling ==
In Tibet, the existence of Gesar as a historical figure is rarely questioned. Some scholars have argued that he was born in 1027, based on a note in a 19th-century chronicle, the Mdo smad chos 'byung by Brag dgon pa dkon mchog bstan pa rab. Certain core episodes appear to reflect events recorded at the dawn of Tibetan history. For example, the marriage to a Chinese princess is reminiscent of legends concerning king Songtsän Gampo's alliance marriage with Princess Wencheng in 641. Legends variously place him in Golok, (Note: A Xinhua News Agency report in 2002 registers that Han and Sino-Tibetan scholars had confidently pinned down the mythical Gesar's roots in Axu town in the prairie of Dege County located in the Garzê Tibetan Autonomous Prefecture of southwest Sichuan Province. In this interpretation, Gesar's 'soul mountain' would be the famous snow peak of Golog in modern Qinghai Province. Xinhua News Agency 'Birthplace of Tibetan Hero Gesser Confirmed, 8 July 2002.) between Dotō and Domé, (Note: Shakabpa 2010, pp. 192–95 discusses the great confusion in Tibetan sources over Gesar, identified as a magical lord named Lingjé Gesar Kyechok Norbu Dradül and his putative birthplace, but placing his year of birth in 1053 or 1060(=1081). See note 1 p.194.) or in Markham, Tanak, Öyuk or the village of Panam on the Nyang River.

Given the mythological and allegorical elements of the story, which defy place and time, the historicity of figures within the cycle remain indeterminate. Although the epic was sung all over Tibetan-speaking regions, with Kham and Amdo long regarded as centers of its diffusion, traditions do connect Gesar with the former Kingdom of Ling (Wylie: gling). In Tibetan, gling means "island" but like the Sanskrit word dvīpa, it can also carry the secondary meaning of "continent". Ling was a petty kingdom located in Kham, between the Yangtze and Yalong River. The Gsumge Mani Stone Castle, situated near the source of the Yalong River, houses a shrine dedicated to Gesar at its centre. A historical kingdom of Lingtsang (Wylie: gling tshang) existed until the 20th century.

== Growth of the epic ==
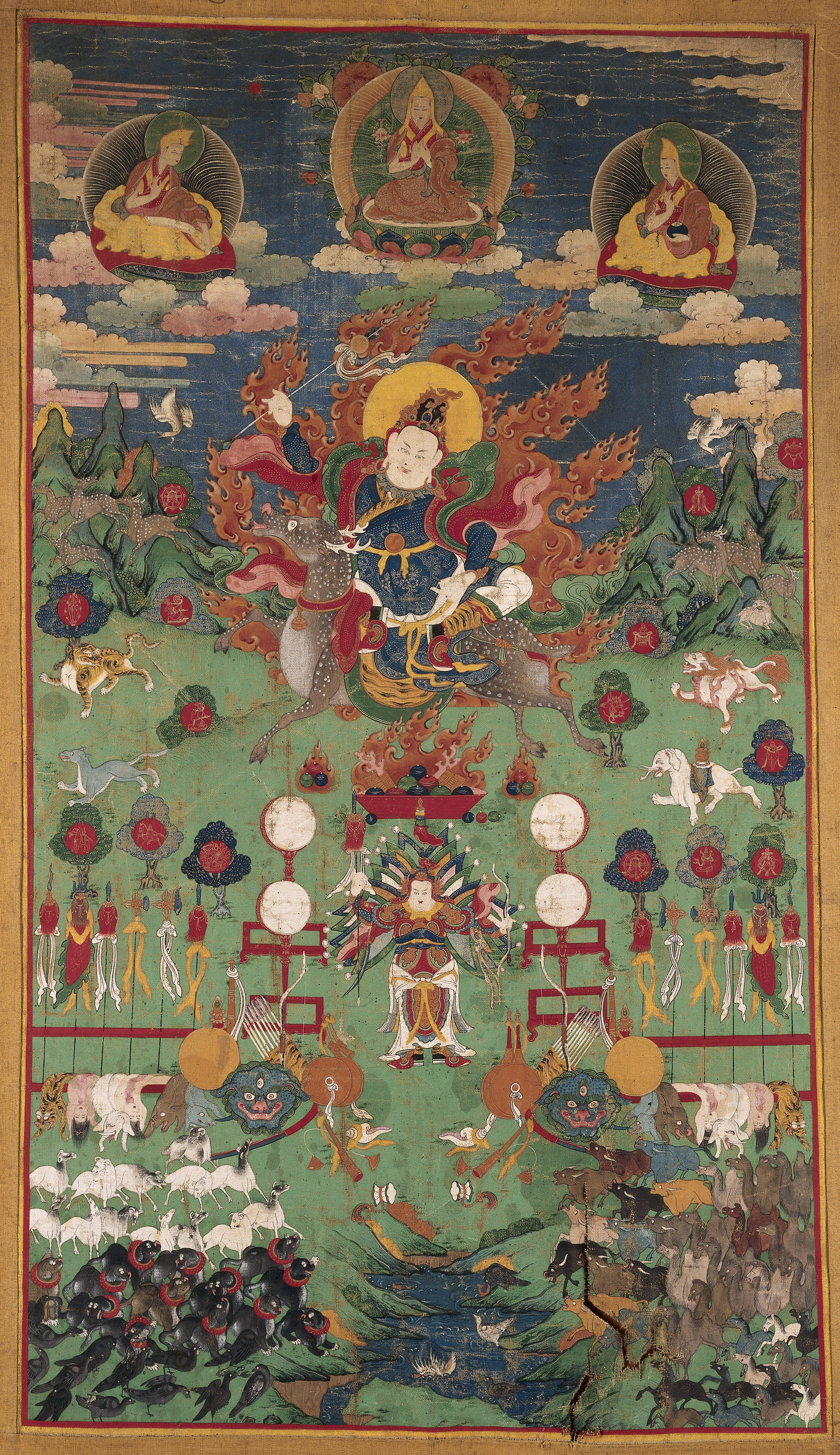
Gesar of Ling riding a reindeer

The success of the Turk Fromo Kesaro, whose name is a Persian pronunciation of "Rome (Byzantium) Caesar", in overwhelming an intrusive Arab army in Gandhara sometime between 739 and 745, may have formed the historic core behind the Gesar epic in Tibet. In the records of the earliest rulers of Ladakh, Baltistan, and Gilgit, whose countries were later overrun by Tibetans, royal ancestry is connected to the Bactrian Gesar.

In its distinctive Tibetan form, the epic appears to date from the time of the second transmission of Buddhism to Tibet, marked by the emergence of the Sarma or "new schools" of Tibetan Buddhism. However, the narrative also incorporates early elements derived from Indian tantricism. The oral tradition of this epic is most prominent in two remote regions associated with the pre-Buddhist ethnic religion known as Bon (Ladakh and Zanskar in the far west of Tibet and Kham and Amdo in the east), strongly suggesting that the story has indigenous roots. According to R. A. Stein, However, the oral versions known today are not earlier than the written versions, but rather depend on them. (Note: Herrmann 1990, p. 499: 'die mündlichen Versionen, die wir heute kennen, sind nicht ursprünglicher, sondern hängen sicher von den geschriebenen Fassungen ab.')

As an oral tradition, a large number of variants have always existed, and no canonical text can be written. However, the epic narrative was certainly in something similar to its present form by the 15th century at the latest as shown by the mentions in the rLangs-kyi Po-ti bSe-ru by Byang chub rgyal mtshan. Despite the age of the tradition, the oldest extant text of the epic is actually the Mongolian woodblock print commissioned by the Kangxi Emperor of Qing China in 1716. None of the Tibetan texts that have come down to us are earlier than the 18th century, although they are likely based on older texts that have not survived. In the late 19th and early 20th centuries a woodblock printing of the story was compiled by a scholar-monk from Ling-tsang, a small kingdom northeast of Derge, with inspiration from the prolific Tibetan philosopher Jamgon Ju Mipham Gyatso.

The wide variety of cultures in which the Gesar epic is encountered means that the name for the hero varies. In Tibetan legends Gesar is variously called Gesar of Ling, Ling Gesar, and Gesar Norbu Dradul. Among the Buryat he is known as Abai Geser Khubun. The Khalkha oral version calls him Altan Bogdo khan. An Altai version calls him Sädängkäi Käsär and Sartaktai Käsär. Among the Balti and Ladakhi people he is most famously known as Gyalpo Kaiserr.

=== Story and narrative motifs ===
The epic has a vast number of variants in plot and motifs, but the core of the story, similar to that of many legendary cycles, has been summed up as follows:

King Ge-sar has a miraculous birth, a despised and neglected childhood, and then becomes ruler and wins his (first) wife 'Brug-mo through a series of marvellous feats. In subsequent episodes he defends his people against various external aggressors, human and superhuman. Instead of dying a normal death he departs into a hidden realm from which he may return at some time in the future to save his people from their enemies.

For Samuels, the Gesar epic lies towards the shamanic pole in the continuum of Tibetan culture and religion, which he sees as evincing a constant tension between 'clerical' and 'shamanic' Buddhism, the latter grounded in its earlier Bon substrate. ((Samuel 1993, pp. 7–23); (Samuel 2005, p. 166)) The received versions of the Ge-sar cycle are thickly overlaid with Buddhist ideas and motifs, and detecting the original 'heroic' form is difficult. Historical analysis to sift out an ancient core narrative winnows the archaic folkloric leitmotifs from features that show distinct and historically identifiable Buddhist influences. Samuel, comparing three Gesar traditions, Mongolian, Eastern Tibetan and Ladakhi, that developed relatively autonomously, postulates the following core narrative shared by all three:

- (1) The Lha gling episode.
- (2) The ′Khrungs gling episode.
- (3) The rTa rgyugs episode.
- (4) The bDud 'dul episode.
- (5) The Hor gling episode. (Note: Stein 1959, pp. 188–9 says 'Hor' was an ethnonym that originally referred to the Uyghurs, and from the 12th century CE to the Mongols.)
- (6) The China journey episode.

To which one might add:

- (7) The Srid pa'i le'u cosmogenic prelude.

=== Tibetan versions ===
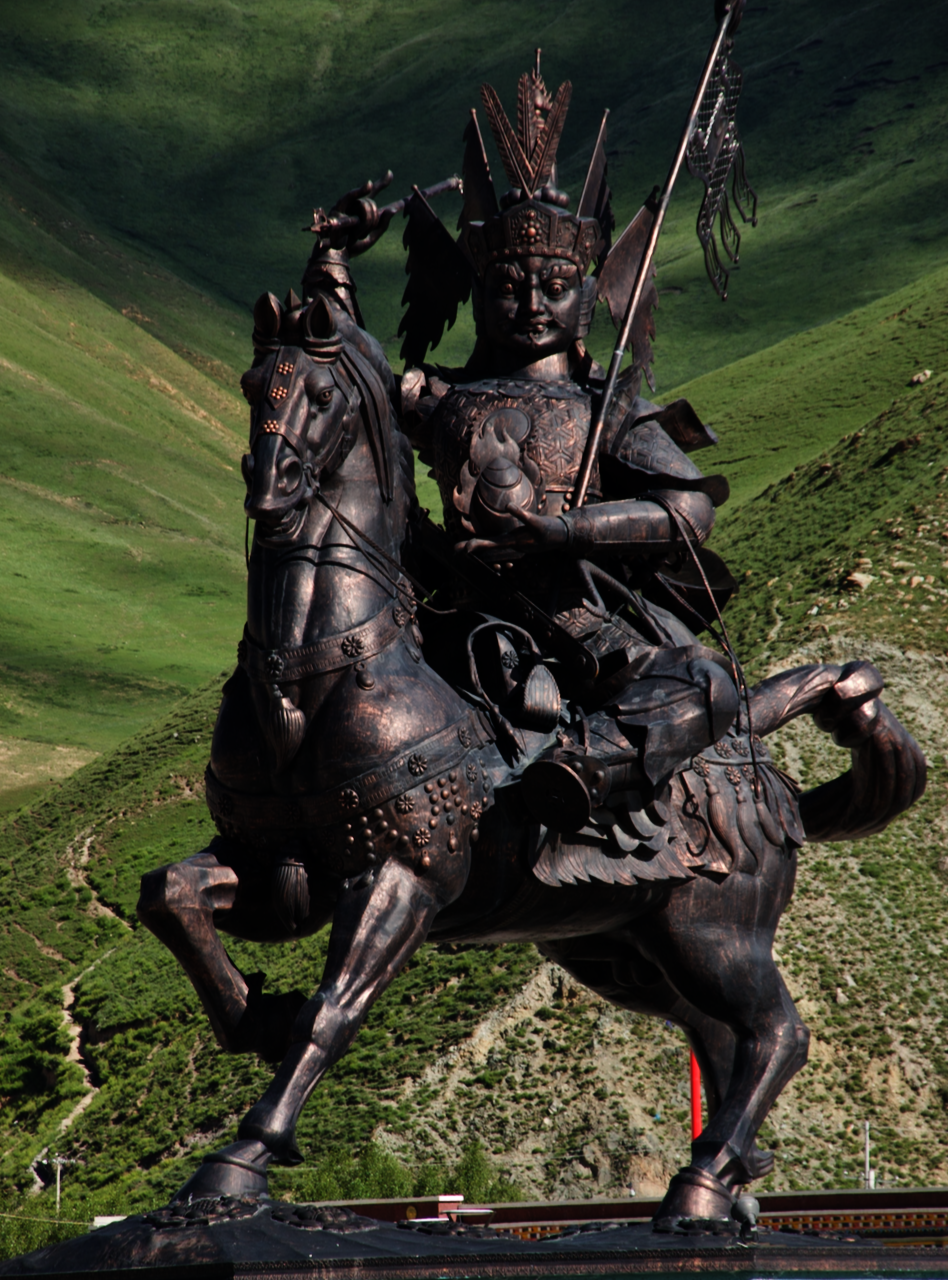
Monument of Gesar of Ling, Yushu, Qinghai, 2009

Tibetan versions differ very greatly in details. Often Buddhist motifs are conspicuous, with episodes on the creation of the world and Tibet's cosmic origins. In other variants, Gautama Buddha is never mentioned, or a certain secular irony is voiced against the national religion. According to Samten Karmay, Gesar arose as the hero of a society still thinly permeated by Buddhism and the earlier myths associate him with pre-Buddhist beliefs like the mountain cult. In most episodes, Gesar fights against the enemies of dharma, an old warrior ethos, where physical power, courage, a combative spirit, and qualities such as cunning and deceit prevail.

- Cosmic prelude and Tibet's early history: One motif explains how the world collapsed into anarchy; numerous demon kings (Wylie: bdud) had avoided subjection. As a result, hordes of cannibalistic demons and goblins, led by malignant and greedy rulers of many kingdoms, wreak havoc. Tibet's conversion from barbarity to Buddhism under the three great Dharma Kings often features. Episodes relate how Padmasambhāva (also known as Guru Rinpoche) subdued Tibet's violent native spirits.
- Gesar's miraculous or mundane birth: In one account, he was fatherless, like Padmasambhava, who assists his celestial creation by creating a nagini who then serves the king of Ling, and is impregnated by drinking a magic potion, and is born from his mother's head, like Athena in Greek mythology. In another version he is conceived by his mother after she drinks water impressed with his image. Alternatively, he is born from the union of a father, who is simultaneously skygod and holy mountain, and of a mother who is a goddess of the watery underworld, or he is born, Chori, in the lineage of Ling in the Dza Valley, to the king Singlen Gyalpo and his spouse Lhakar Drönma of Gog.
- Relatives: He has a half-brother, and two uncles. One uncle is the "old hawk" (Wylie: spyi dpon rong tsha), the wise elder of Ling, who supports the child; the other, the cowardly and greedy Khrothung, sees the child as a threat and tries to do him ill. Khrothung is portrayed comically, but his role as a provocateur is central to the narrative.
- His early years: Gesar's mission as a divine emissary is to vanquish powerful demons on earth. Until his adolescence he is depicted as black, ugly, nasty, snotty, (Note: Stein 1959, p. 545 remarks on this as a notable feature in Khalkha Mongol versions.) and troublesome. His paternal uncle, or the king's brother Todong, banishes both mother and son to the rMa plateau, where he grows up living a feral life, clothed in animal skins and wearing a hat adorned with antelope horns.

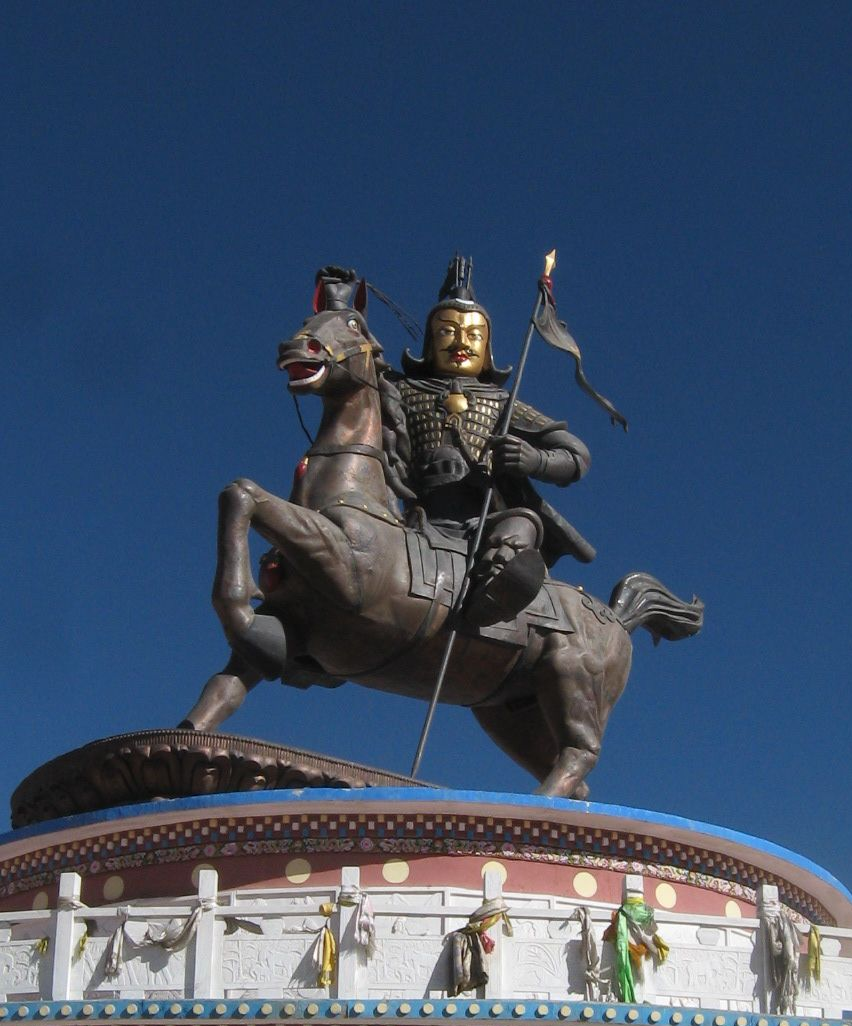
Statue of King Gesar in Maqen County, Qinghai

- Horse race and kingship: When he is 12, a horse race is held whose winner will marry 'Brugmo, the beautiful daughter of a neighbouring chieftain, and become king of Ling. Returning to Ling, Gesar wins the race, marries 'Brugmo, and ascends the golden throne. His victory marks his coming of age; he proclaims himself "the Great Lion, Wish-fulfilling Jewel, Subduer of Foes," and takes the name Gesar. Mounted on his miraculous steed Kyang Go Karkar, he subsequently wages military campaigns, together with 30 companions, against the frontier countries that represent evil.
- The kidnapping of 'Brugmo: While Gesar is away on his first campaign (against Klu btsan, the man-eating demon of the north), his wife is kidnapped by Gurdkar (lit. "white tent"), the King of Hor. Upon his return, Gesar uses magic to infiltrate Gurdkar's palace, kills him, and retrieves his wife.
- Two further campaigns: Gesar wages war against King Sadam of 'Jang (sometimes located in Yunnan), and king Shingkhri of Mon (Mon is often located in the southern Himalayas and was historically used as a term for "barbarian borderlands" until recently).
- The 18 fortresses (Wylie: rdzong chen bco brgyad): Gesar sets out to conquer the 18 great forts (Wylie: rdzong). They are listed differently according to singers and texts, but these battles nearly always include Tajik (Wylie: stag gzig) (Note: Papas 2011, p. 268 writes that Stag-gzig, 'the mythical region of the origin of Bon-po,' was often conflated with 'Ol-mo-lung-ring, which modern scholars locate somewhere between northern Persia and Tibet's western borders.' It refers apparently... to the Persian-speaking part of Central Asia, that is, the land of the Tajiks according to Islamic sources, including present-day Tajikistan and Southern Uzbekistan, more precisely the Bukhara and the Samarkand areas. Apart from the question of the origin of Bon-po, one can perceive the name Stag-gzig/Tajik as a memory, in Tibetan culture, of its Central Asian roots.') and Khache Muslim adversaries.
- Lhasa: Some versions say that, aged 39, he made a retreat on Red Hill (Wylie: dmar po ri), where the Potala Palace was later built.
- Old age: When Gesar reaches his eighties, he briefly descends to Hell as a final episode before he leaves the land of men and ascends once more to his celestial paradise.

=== Mongolian version (1716) ===
- Opens with a heavenly prologue: Ge-ser's birth, youth, marriage to Rogmo and his obtaining the kingship of Ling.
- Geser defeats a black striped tiger.
- Geser's voyage to China where he marries a Chinese princess.
- Geser's defeat of the demon king, with the help of the latter's wife.
- Geser's war against the three kings of Sharaigol (Hor).
- Geser's defeat of a demon who assumed the guise of a lama.
- Geser's descent to hell to rescue his mother.

There was a 2017 version of this translated into English. (Note: Rachewiltz, Igor De And Li Narangoa. 2017. Joro's Youth: The first part of the Mongolian epic of Geser Khan. Australian National University Press.)

=== Buryat version ===
Buryat versions of the epic focus mainly on Gesar's battles with various demons, rather than on military campaigns. They also contain a detailed and drastically different prologue to Gesar's exploits. According to these versions, the great Tengri Khormusta (Turmas, Khorbustu, Hormust) khan of the celestial tribes of the West waged war with Atai Ulan, khan of the malicious gods of the east. After his victory, Khormusta dismembers Atai Ulan to prevent his resurrection and throws his body parts to Earth, where they become demons and monsters. The act almost causes the extinction of humanity; the middle son of Khormusta (Bukhe Belligte or Uile Butelegcji) is sent from the realm of heaven to undo the damage.

The Buryat version contains 9 branches or song episodes (uliger), each devoted to telling how Gesar defeats an enemy.

- First branch: Gesar's youth. In this branch, Gesar, called Nyurgai (Stinker) and while still in his infancy, defeats three giant rats, human-sized mosquitos and steel ravens (compare Heracles and Cú Chulainn) and marries two princesses, whereupon he assumes his true name.
- Second branch: He marries princess Alma Mergen, daughter of a water deity. He then hunts demonic beasts, born from Atai Ulan's drops of blood. These include a mountain-sized dragon, the keeper of a silver mountain.
- Third branch: He undertakes combat with the great Lord of the Taiga, the giant tiger Orgoli, which was born from Atai Ulan's right hand.
- Fourth branch: He kills a great beast, Arkhan the Sun-Eater, who was born from Atai Ulan's severed head.
- Fifth branch: He wars against Gal Dulme, the personification of volcanic activity, who was born from Atai Ulan's corpse. Because of his youth Gesar is unable to defeat Gal Dulme by himself, and the deed is performed with assistance from his elder brother.
- Sixth branch: He wars against Abarga Sasen, a 15-headed demon born from Atai Ulan's right leg.
- Seventh branch: He wars against Shiram Minata, a demon from the 'Country betwixt Life and Death', who was born from Atai Ulan's left leg.
- Eighth branch: He wages war against three Shirai-Gol khans. This branch seems to be closely related to the Tibetan song about Gesar and three kings of the kingdom of Hor.
- Ninth branch: He campaigns against Lobsogoi, a trickster demon, who was born from Atai Ulan's backside.

There are a number of stories not connected with the foregoing nine branches described above; for example, a story in which Gesar shames Gume-Khan of China, or one in which he exterminates the Four Recklings of Evil, demonic beings whose nature is not quite clear.

Distinctive features of these versions of the Gesar epic have led some scholars to the view that the Buryat and Mongolian versions are not directly dependent on a Tibetan original. Setsenmunkh has argued, and the idea was shared by C. Damdinsuren and B. Vladimirtsev, that the written Mongolian versions stem from one source that has not survived.

=== Balti and Ladakhi version ===
This version contains the following seven episodes:

- In the Balti version of the Kesar epic he is considered to be son of god (Lha Yokpoon) who was sent to Miyul(Earth) to restore peace and stability.
- According to Balti oral transmission he was born in the village of Roung Yul, Baltistan.
- The ancestor Dong-gsum Mi-la sngon-mo, born miraculously, kills a nine-headed ogre, from whose body the land of Ling is born. He fathers eighteen heroes who arrive in gLing.
- dBang-po rgya-bzhin chooses his youngest son, Don-grub, to rule gLing. Dying, he is reborn as a bird, and then as Gog-bzang lha-mo, and is called Kesar/Kyesar.
- Kesar marries Lhamo Brugmo and becomes king of gLing.
- Kesar journeys to China, where he marries the emperor's daughter, g.Yu'i dKon-mchog-ma.
- Kesar defeats the giants of the north, assisted by the giant's wife, Dze-mo.
- While he is away, the King of Hor kidnaps his wife 'Brug-gu-ma.
- On his return, Kesar vanquishes the King of Hor and brings his wife back to gLing.

=== Similarities with motifs in Turkic heroic poetry ===
Chadwick and Zhirmunsky consider that the main outlines of the cycle as we have it in Mongolia, Tibet and Ladakh show an outline that conforms to the pattern of heroic poetry among the Turkic peoples. (a) Like the Kirghiz hero Bolot, Gesar, as part of an initiation descends as a boy into the underworld. (b) The gateway to the underworld is through a rocky hole or cave on a mountain summit. (c) He is guided through the otherworld by a female tutelary spirit (Manene/grandmother) who rides an animal, like the Turkic shamaness Kara Chach. (d) Like Kara Chach, Gesar's tutelary spirit helps him against a host of monstrous foes in the underworld. (e) Like Bolot, Gesar returns in triumph to the world, bearing the food of immortality and the water of life. (f) Like the Altai shamans, Gesar is borne heavenward on the back of a bird to obtain herbs to heal his people. They conclude that the stories of the Gesar cycle were well known in the territory of the Uyghur Khaganate.

=== Oral transmission and performance ===
According to Li Lianrong (李連榮):

By narrowing the period of its creation to the tenth and eleventh centuries, the dynamic of literary composition is erroneously attributed to an oral epic. Furthermore, the epic reflects Tibetan society during the sixth to ninth centuries rather than the tenth century. Thus a satisfactory conclusion about the epic's origins cannot be drawn based on the lifespans of historical heroic figures.

Jiangbian pointed out that the foundation for the origin of epic is ethnic folk culture. He conjectured that before epics came into being, the Tibetan people "already had a corpus of stories that described the formation of the heavens and the earth, their ethnic origin, and ethnic heroes; these stories provided a foundation for creating the character Gesar, also known as Sgrung in early history. After further polishing by the oral poets, especially the ballad singers, Gesar became a great epic" (1986:51). Many performers recite episodes from memory or books, while others chant the legendary tales in a state of trance. This last mode bears strong similarities with shamanic practitioners like the pawo mediums and mig mthong diviners.

As an heroic song composed or recited by oral bards, the epic of Gesar has been, for centuries, improvised on, and there is therefore no canonical or monumental version, as one finds in, for example, Greek epic. A given Gesar singer would know only his local version, which nonetheless would take weeks to recite. It has been responsive to regional culture and folklore, local conflicts, religious trends, and even political changes on the world stage. For example, in modern times, when news of World War II trickled into Tibet, additional episodes on how Gesar conquers the Kingdom of Phyigling 'Jar were composed by the 8th Khamthrül Rinpoche (1929–1980), in which Gesar appears, according to some interpretations, to travel to Germany to vanquish the demon-king, perhaps alluding to Adolf Hitler.

=== Religious dimension ===
Tibetan history has often swung between centralized and stateless poles, and the epic of Gesar reflects the tensions between central authority, as embodied in religious orthodoxy, and the wild, nomadic forces of the autarkic periphery. There are versions that adopt Gesar as a lama showing him as a tamer of the wild, but, in so far as his epic retains his old lineaments as a maverick master of shamanic powers, he represents the stateless, anarchic dimension of Tibet's margins, and is rather a tamer of corrupt monastic clerics and, thus, it is not coincidental that the epic flourished on the outlying regions of Kham and Amdo. His wars are campaigns of defence against hostile powers intent on subduing the kingdom of gLing, which are often construed as anti-Buddhist. But his vanquishing of the dzongs or fortresses preserves an ambiguity, since these were potential outposts of the state.

Until recently, the tale was forbidden reading in many Tibetan monasteries. In some monasteries, however, rituals invoking Gesar as a major spiritual force are performed. Given the central role the epic played over the centuries in Tibetan folk culture, Tibetan Buddhism has incorporated elements from it and interpreted them in religious terms. The Gelug school disapproved of the epic, while the Kagyu and Nyingma schools generally favoured it, seeing it as an expression of the activity of Padmasambhava and as a vehicle for Buddhist teachings, especially of the Dzogchen school. Consequentially, the question of whether babdrung (visionary Gesar bards) should be regarded as religious practitioners (Wylie: chos pa) will be answered differently by those who favor and those who oppose the epic; the babdrung themselves, however, generally emphasize the connection of the epic with the Dharma (Wylie: chos, THL: chö) and see themselves as a kind of religious practitioner.

Orgyen Tobgyal explained that in the Nyingma perspective, "the real nature of the manifestation we know as Ling Gesar is actually that of Guru Rinpoche himself appearing in the form of a drala" (Wylie: dgra bla, "protective warrior spirit").

Chögyam Trungpa, who represented both Kagyu and Nyingma lineages and founded Shambhala Buddhism in the diaspora, was inspired by the Greek philosophers of the polis, used the Gesar epic's detailed tales about an idealized nomadic government formed by the Mukpo clan, which constructed a nomadic confederation of imperial reach, to develop a model of a Tibetan polity.

The government of China strongly supports the cult of Gesar and its practice among Han Chinese, according to some observers, as a counter-force to Tibetan Buddhism.

In the region of Baltistan the King Kesar's saga was told in homes, especially in winter, but now it is on the verge of extinction due to availability of media devices. The region being inhabited by 100% Muslim population, shared the story only for recreational purposes, and people would consider that Kesar was not a human being but "hla hlu", special creatures of God who are given special command and ability by God.

== History of Gesar studies ==
The first printed edition of the Gesar epic was published in Beijing in 1716 in a Mongolian version. It was this text that formed the basis for the first Western-language translation, a Russian version published by the Moravian missionary Isaac Jacob Schmidt in 1836. A German translation followed in 1839. Another Moravian missionary, August Hermann Francke, collected and translated a version from Lower Ladakh between 1905 and 1909. In 1942, George Roerich made a comprehensive survey of the literature of Gesar (Roerich 1942; 277–315).

In the 20th century, other Mongolian Geser texts were edited by the social scientists Nicholas Poppe and Walther Heissig.

The first three volumes of the version known as the Lingtsang-Dege woodblock, which was composed in the late 19th and early 20th centuries, were published with a very faithful, though incomplete, French translation by Rolf Stein in 1956. Stein followed this publication with his 600-page magnum opus on the Tibetan Epic entitled Recherches sur l'Epopee et le Barde au Tibet. This remains the most in-depth study of the Tibetan Gesar tradition. A literal translation of these same woodblocks into English was written by Kornman, Khandro, and Chonam and published by Shambhala in 2012 as The Epic of Gesar of Ling: Gesar's Magical Birth, Early Years, and Coronation as King. A retelling of these volumes in a more accessible and contemporary voice was rendered by David Shapiro and published in 2019 as Gesar of Ling: A Bardic Tale from the Snow Land of Tibet.

The fourth volume of the epic, generally known as The Battle of Düd and Ling was translated by Jane Hawes, David Shapiro and Lama Chonam and published as The Taming of the Demons: From the Epic of Gesar in 2021 (Shambhala 2021).

Another version has been translated into German by Matthias Hermanns (1965). This translation is based on manuscripts collected by Hermanns in Amdo. This book also contains an extensive study by Hermanns explaining the epic as the product of the Heroic Age of the nomads of northeastern Tibet and their interactions with the many other peoples of the Inner Asian steppe. Hermanns believed the epic to pre-date Buddhism in Tibet, and saw in it an expression of the ancient Tibetan archetype of the "heaven-sent king", as found also in the myths of the founders of the Yarlung Dynasty, who founded the Tibetan Empire (7th-9th centuries CE).

An accessible rendering of Gesar by Alexandra David-Néel in her "Superhuman Life of Gesar of Ling" was published in French in 1933.

=== In occultism ===
In the occult system of Nicholas Roerich, Gesar is presented as a hero who is believed to have assumed physical form in Shambhala. It is said that he would appear with an invincible army to set general justice. Thunderous arrows will be their weapon. Gesar also has a number of magic attributes: a white horse, saddle, horseshoe, sword and lock.

== Sources ==
- Beyer, Stephan V (1992). The classical Tibetan language. Albany, New York: SUNY Press. ISBN 978-0-7914-1099-8.
- Chadwick, Hector Munro; Chadwick, Nora Kershaw (1940). The Growth of Literature. Vol. 3 (Reprinted 1986 ed.). Cambridge University Press. ISBN 978-1-108-01615-5.
- Chadwick, Nora Kershaw; Zhirmunsky, Viktor (1969). Oral Epics of Central Asia. Cambridge University Press. ISBN 978-0-521-14828-3.
- Chayet, Anne (2003). "The Potala, Symbol of the Power of the Dalai Lamas". In Pommaret, Françoise (ed.). Lhasa in the seventeenth century: the capital of the Dalai Lamas. BRILL. ISBN 978-90-04-12866-8.
- David-Néel, Alexandra; Yongden, Lama (2004) [First published 1933]. The Superhuman Life Of Gesar Of Ling. Kessinger Publishing. ISBN 978-0-7661-8686-6.
- Dorji, Gyalsten K. "In remembrance of Nyikems' past: The Royal Textile Museum hosts a display entitled "In the Service of our Kings"". Kuensel Online.
- Dwyer, Arienne M. (2007). Salar: a study in Inner Asian language contact processes. Part 1: Phonology. Turcologia 31,7. Vol. 1. Otto Harrassowitz Verlag. ISBN 978-3-447-04091-4.
- Francke, August Hermann (2000) [1905/1909]. A Lower Ladakhi Version of the Kesar Saga. Delhi: Asian Educational Services. ISBN 978-81-206-1507-6.
- Harmatta, J.; Litvinsky, B. A. (1999). "Tokharistan and Gandhara under Western Türk rule (650-750)". In Dani, Ahmad Hasan (ed.). History of civilizations of Central Asia. Vol. 3. Delhi: Motilal Banarsidass. pp. 367–402. ISBN 978-81-208-1540-7.
- Harvilahti, Lauri (1996). "Epos and National Identity: Transformations and Incarnations" (PDF). Oral Tradition. 11 (1). Beijing: 37–49. Archived from the original (PDF) on 25 May 2011.
- Helffer, Mireille (1977). Les chants dans l'épopée tibétaine de Ge-sar d'après le Livre de la Course de Cheval: Version chantée de Blo-bzaṅ bstan-'jin. Paris: Librairie Droz. ISBN 978-2-600-03309-1.
- Hermanns, Matthias (1965). Das National-Epos der Tibeter Gling König Ge Sar. Regensburg.: Josef Habbel Verlag.
- Herrmann, Silke (1990). "The Life and History of the Epic King Gesar in Ladakh". In Honko, Lauri (ed.). Religion, myth, and folklore in the world's epics: the Kalevala and its predecessors. Walter de Gruyter. pp. 485–501. ISBN 978-3-11-012253-4.
- Hummel, Siegbert (1998). Eurasian Mythology in the Tibetan epic of Gesar. Guido Vogliotti (trans.). Dharamsala: The Library of Tibetan Works and Archives. ISBN 978-81-86470-20-6.
- rgyal-mtsho, 'Jam-dpal (1990). "The Singers of the King Gesar Epic". In Honko, Lauri (ed.). Religion, myth, and folklore in the world's epics: the Kalevala and its predecessors. Walter de Gruyter. pp. 471–484. ISBN 978-3-11-012253-4.
- Jiàngbiān Jiācuò, (降邊嘉措) (1998). "Gesar in contemporary Tibetan Culture". In Honko, Lauri; Handoo, Jawaharlal; Foley, John Miles (eds.). The Epic: Oral and Written. Mysore: Central Institute of Indian Languages. pp. 220–225. ISBN 81-7342-055-6.
- Kornman, Robin (2005). "The Influence of the Epic of King Gesar on Chogyam Trungpa". In Midal, Fabrice (ed.). Recalling Chögyam Trungpa. Boston, Massachusetts: Shambhala Publications. pp. 347–379. ISBN 978-1-59030-207-1.
- Li Lianrong, (李連榮) (2001). "History and the Tibetan Epic Gesar" (PDF). Oral Tradition. 16 (2). Beijing: 317–342. Archived from the original (PDF) on 2 December 2017.
- Lopez, Donald S (2007) [First published 1997]. Religions of Tibet in Practice. Princeton, Massachusetts: Princeton University Press. ISBN 978-0-691-12972-3.
- Maconi, Lara (2004). "Gesar de Pékin? Le sort du Roi Gesar de Gling, héros épique tibétain, en Chine (post-)maoïste". In Labarthe, Judith (ed.). Formes modernes de la poésie épique: nouvelles approches. Bruxelles: Peter Lang. pp. 371–419. ISBN 978-90-5201-196-7.
- Martin, Dan (2011). "Greek and Islamic Medicines' Historical Contact with Tibet". In Akasoy, Anna; Burnett, Charles; Yoeli-Tlalim, Ronit (eds.). Islam and Tibet: Interactions Along the Musk Routes. Farnham, Surrey: Ashgate Publishing. pp. 117–144. ISBN 978-0-7546-6956-2.
- Needham, Joseph (1988) [First published 1954]. Science and Civilization in China. Vol. 1. Cambridge University Press. ISBN 0-521-05799-X.
- Papas, Alexandre (2011). "So Close to Samarkand, Lhasa: Sufi Hagiographies, Founder Lhasa and Sacred Space". In Akasoy, Anna; Burnett, Charles; Yoeli-Tlalim, Ronit (eds.). Islam and Tibet: Interactions Along the Musk Routes. Farnham, Surrey: Ashgate Publishing. pp. 261–280. ISBN 978-0-7546-6956-2.
- Penick, Douglas J (1996). The warrior song of King Gesar. Boston, Massachusetts: Wisdom Publications. ISBN 978-0-86171-113-0.
- Penick, Douglas J (2009). Crossings on a Bridge of Light: The Songs and Deeds of Gesar, King of Ling, as He Travels to Shambhala Through the Realms of Life and Death. Minneapolis: Mill City Press. ISBN 978-1-934937-99-0.
- Penny, Benjamin (2013). Religion and Biography in China and Tibet. Routledge. pp. 185–187. ISBN 978-113611394-9.
- Rinbochay, Lati; Sö-nam-drak-ba, Paṅ-chen; Rinbochay, Denma Lo-chö (1997) [First published 1983]. Zahler, Leah; Hopkins, Jeffrey (eds.). Meditative States in Tibetan Buddhism. Somerville Massachusetts: Wisdom Publications. ISBN 0-86171-119-X.
- Rinpoche, Sakyong Mipham (2005). "The Teaching of Shambhala". In Midal, Fabrice (ed.). Recalling Chögyam Trungpa. Boston, Massachusetts: Shambhala Publications. pp. 329–336. ISBN 978-1-59030-207-1.
- Sacharovska, Alexandra; Soloichin, Vladimir (1986). Гэсэр: бурятский народный героический эпос (Geser: a Buryat Heldenepos.). Burjatskoe Knižnoe Izdatelʹstvo.
- Samuel, Geoffrey (1993). Civilized Shamans: Buddhism in Tibetan Societies. Washington, D.C.: Smithsonian Institution Press. ISBN 978-1-56098-620-1.
- Samuel, Geoffrey (2005). Tantric revisionings: new understandings of Tibetan Buddhism and Indian religion. Delhi: Motilal Banarsidass Publ. ISBN 978-81-208-2752-3.
- Sėcėnmunch, Ulʹdzijt (2004). Исследования письменного монгольского эпоса о Гэсэре [Researches on a written version of the Mongolian Epic of Gesar]. ISBN 978-5-94856-085-4.
- Shakabpa, Tsepon Wangchuk Deden (2010) [First published 1976]. One Hundred Thousand Moons: An Advanced Political History of Tibet. Translated by Derek F. Maher. BRILL. ISBN 978-90-04-17788-8.
- Stein, Rolf A (1956). L'épopée tibétaine dans sa version lamaïque de Ling. Paris: Presses Universitaires de France.
- Stein, Rolf A. (1959). Recherches sur l'épopée et le Barde au Tibet. Paris: Presses Universitaires de France.
- Vohra, Rohit (1996). "Early History of Ladakh: Mythic Lore % Fabulation: A preliminary note on the conjectural history of the 1st millennium A.D.". In Osmaston, Henry; Denwood, Philip (eds.). Recent research on Ladakh 4 & 5: proceedings of the fourth and fifth international colloquia on Ladakh. Delhi: Motilal Banarsidass. pp. 216–234. ISBN 978-81-208-1404-2.
- Young, Serinity (2004). Courtesans and tantric consorts: sexualities in Buddhist narrative, iconography and ritual. Routledge. ISBN 978-0-415-91483-3.
