= Sershul Monastery =

Tibetan Buddhist monastery in Sichuan, China

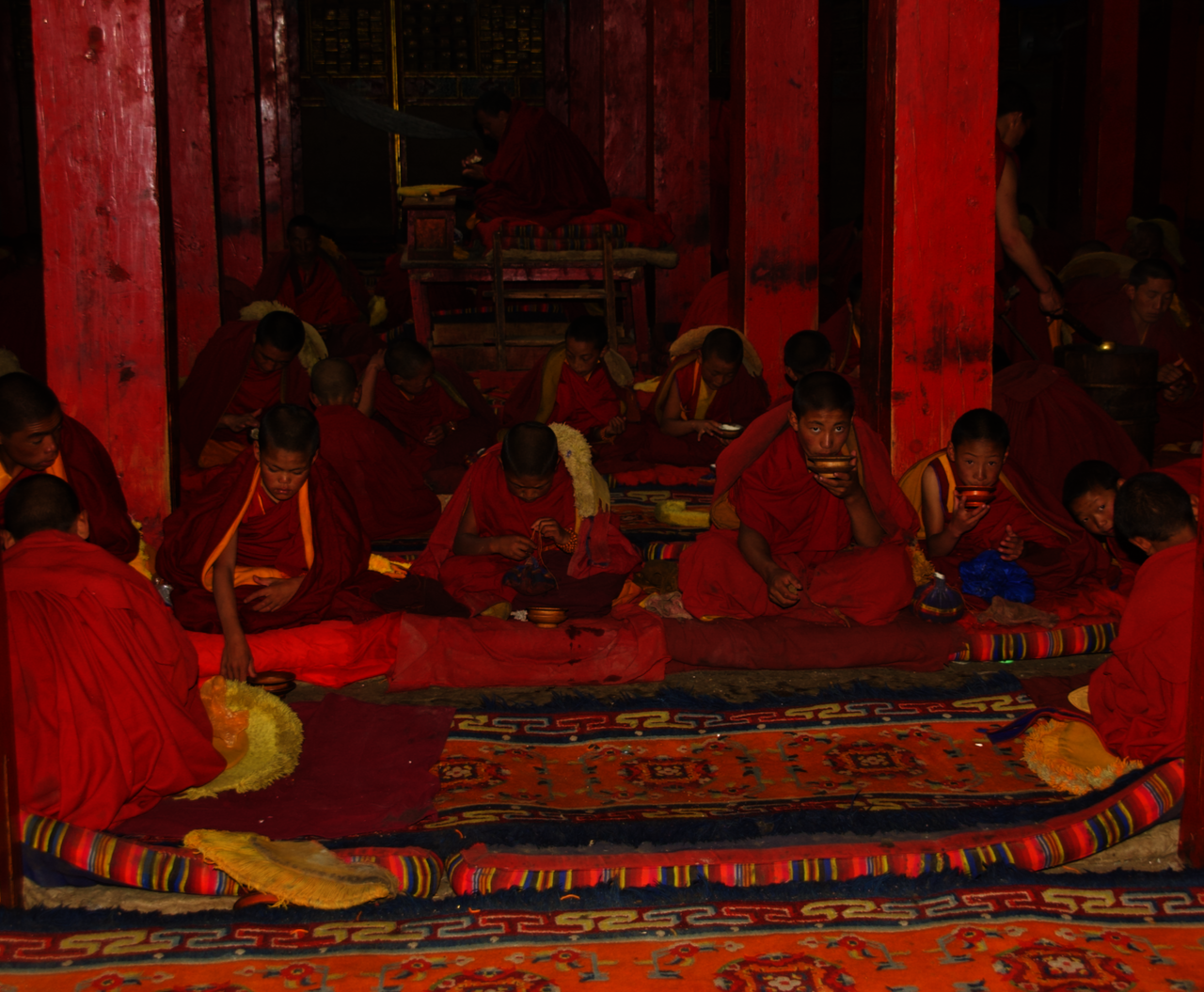
Gelug novices at lunch in Sershul Monastery, c. 2009

Sershul Monastery (Tibetan: སེར་ཤུལ་དགོན།, Wylie: ser shul dgon) is situated on the Tibetan Plateau at an elevation of 4,000 metres (13,000 ft). The Tibetan Buddhist monastery is located near Waxu township in Sêrxü County of the Garzê Tibetan Autonomous Prefecture of Sichuan Province, near where the borders of the Tibet Autonomous Region and Qinghai Province meet.

== Monastery ==
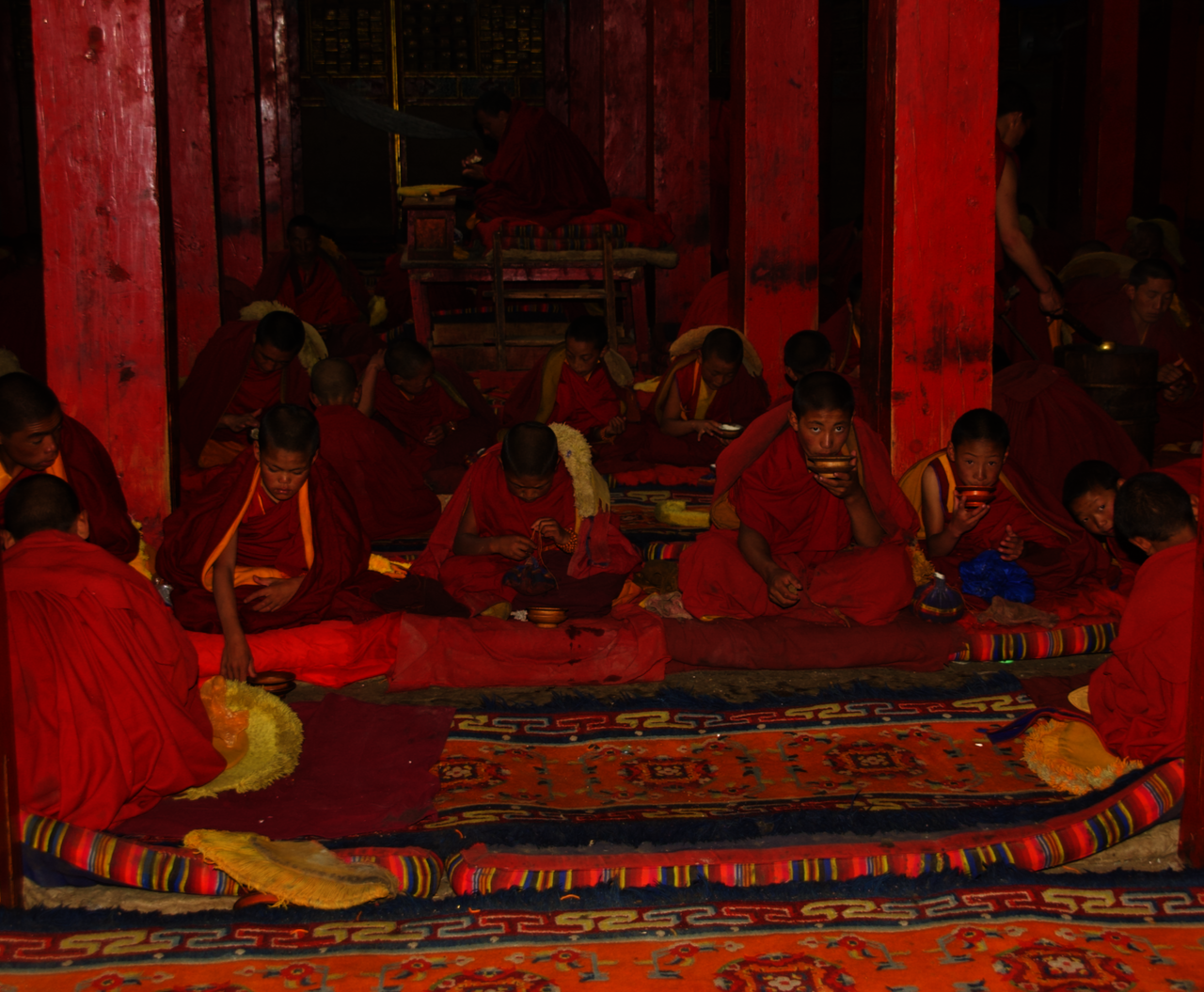
Novices at lunch in Sershul

Sershul Monastery is the largest Gelugpa monastery in the Kham region and has the only Buddhist Monastic University in the Kham region that is qualified to teach and bestow the highest Tibetan Buddhist geshe degree.

Home to 1300 monks, Sershul Monastery is the largest Gelug monastery in Kham, and the religious center of Sêrxü County—the highest, largest, poorest, coldest, and most remote county in Sichuan Province.

== Architecture ==
Sershul Monastery has six existing temples, most of which are fairly well preserved since before 1949.

The largest temple, which is more than 300 years old, contains two great chanting halls devoted to Je Tsongkhapa, founder of the Gelug Order. It also contains many precious relics including one of Je Tsongkhapa's teeth preserved within a sacred chorten (stupa) in the upper gallery.

== Collections ==
Sershul Monastery was established in 1701 and to date has kept a collection of rare sacred Buddhist objects, like the wooden block and hammer used during the initiation and penance ceremonies of monks at the Nalanda University in India at the time of Gautama Buddha – some of the objects having a history of more than 2,000 years.

The monastery also has many valuable sacred relics left by eminent monks after their deaths. Examples are for instance when Trinley Norbu lama died in 1995, a mark was left on his skull in the image Vajrapani. In 1997 when Triwa Lobsang lama died, an image of Arya Tara was left on his heart.

== See also ==
- Tibetan Buddhism
- Gsumge Mani Stone Castle
- Index: Buddhist monasteries in Sichuan, China
- Index: Buddhist monasteries in Tibet
