= Sêrxü County =

County in Sichuan, China

Sêrxü County 石渠县 · སེར་ཤུལ་རྫོང་། Sershul, Dzachuka, Serxu, Shiqu
- County
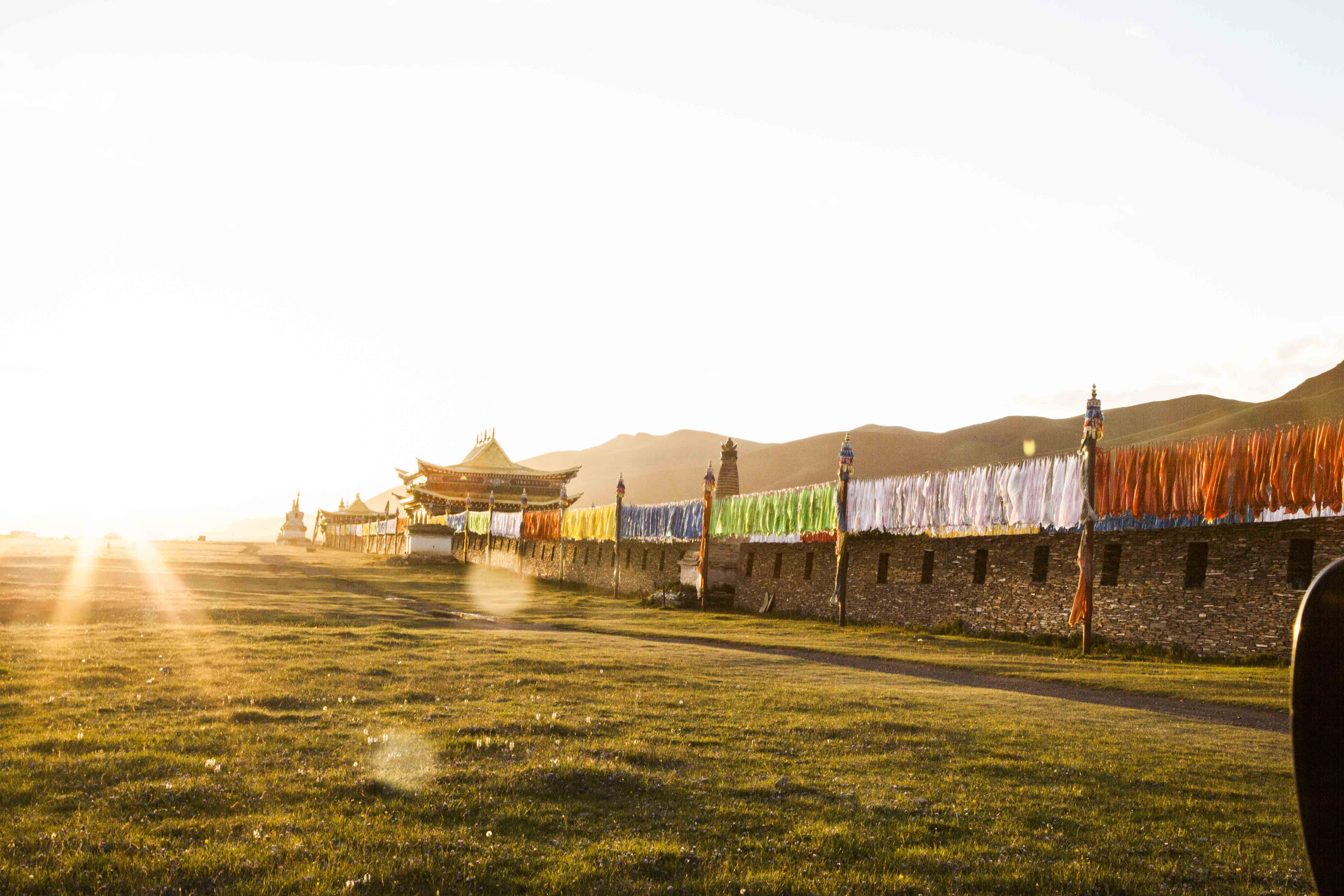
- "Muri Mani" stone sutra

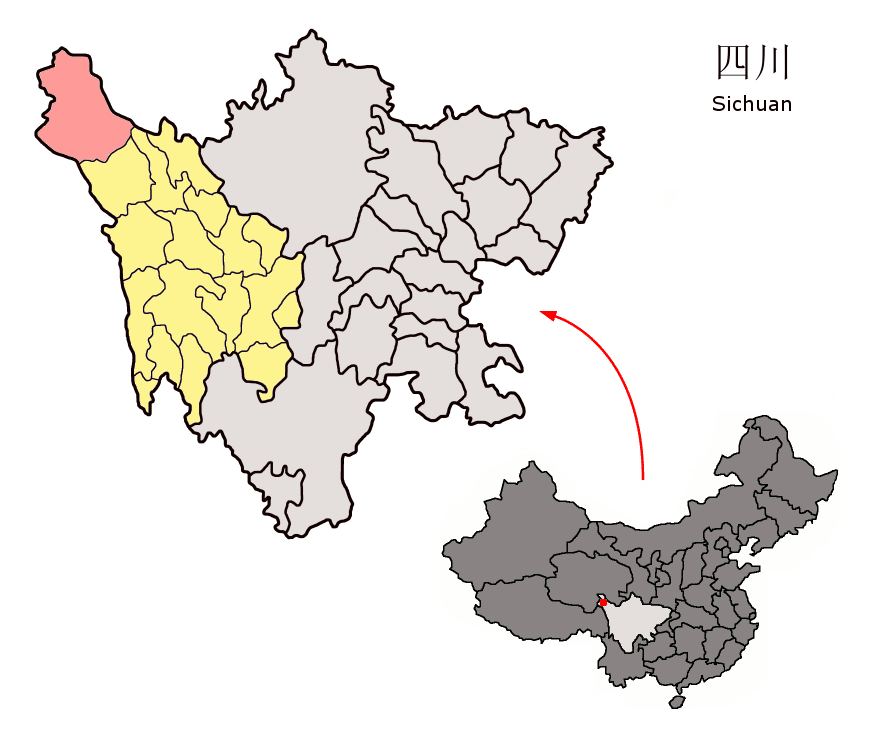
- Location of Sêrxü County (red) within Garzê Prefecture (yellow) and Sichuan

- Location of the seat in Sichuan Sêrxü (China)
- Coordinates: 32°58′44″N 98°06′10″E
- Country: China
- Province: Sichuan
- Autonomous prefecture: Garzê
- County seat: Jugar (Niga)

Area
  - Total: 24,944 km^{2} (9,631 sq mi)

Population (2020)
  - Total: 103,633
  - Density: 4.1546/km^{2} (10.760/sq mi)
- Time zone: UTC+8 (China Standard)
- Website: www.shiqu.gov.cn

Sêrxü County

Chinese name
- Simplified Chinese: 石渠县
- Traditional Chinese: 石渠縣
Transcriptions
Standard Mandarin
- Hanyu Pinyin: Shíqú Xiàn

Tibetan name
- Tibetan: སེར་ཤུལ་རྫོང་།
Transcriptions
- Wylie: ser shul rdzong
- Tibetan Pinyin: Sêrxü Zong

Sêrxü County (Tibetan: སེར་ཤུལ་རྫོང་།; Chinese: 石渠县), also known as Sershul, Dzachuka, Serxu, or Shiqu is a county of the Garzê Tibetan Autonomous Prefecture in the northwest of Sichuan Province, China, bordering Qinghai to the west and the Tibet Autonomous Region to the southwest.

== Geography ==
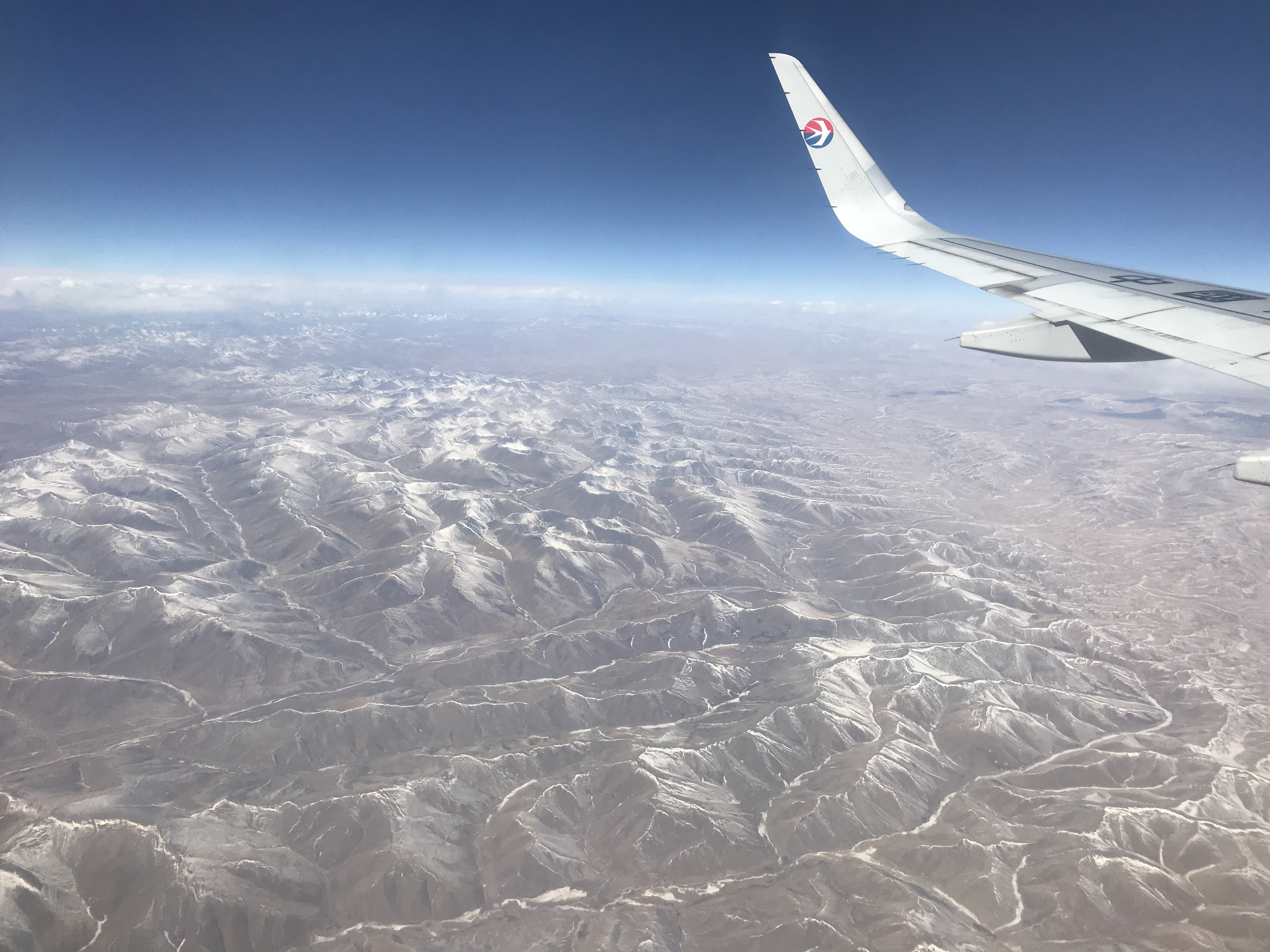
Aerial view of Serxu County.

Sêrxü (sershul) County is situated at the northwest corner of Sichuan province, and is also the westernmost county-level division of the province. Its area is approximately 25,000 km^{2}, mainly covered by grasslands. The average elevation is 4,200 m above sea level.

The area is predominantly covered by grasslands used for nomadic herding. The population is around 68,000, 96% of whom are ethnic Tibetan.

By the end of 1997, there was an estimated livestock population of 581,470. These were mainly yaks, sheep, goats, and horses, but there was a small number of pigs. The human population of Shiqu County was approximately 63,400, 96.8% of which were ethnic Tibetans. There were 49,100 herdsmen, representing 77.6% of the population.

Sershul District villages include: Ariksar, Bumser, Changma, Dezhongma, Dzagyel, Geming, Gotsa, Junyung, Jowo, Kabshi, Kilung, Kyewu, Sershul Gompa, Serxu Dzong, Shaksa, Tromsa Genma, Tseboum Soumdo, Tsemkhog, Ombo and Wathul.

Sershul District has several monasteries, including: Ju Mohar, Sershul Monastery, Bumser Gonpo, Ariksar, Dzagyel, Changma, Trikar, Kabshi and Jowo; and the Gsumge Mani Stone Castle, a religious complex built out of mani stone tablets.

== Administrative divisions ==
Sêrxü County is divided into 7 towns and 14 townships:

Name	Simplified Chinese	Hanyu Pinyin	Tibetan	Wylie	Administrative division code
Towns
Jugar Town (Niga)	尼呷镇	Nígā Zhèn	འཇུ་སྒར་གྲོང་རྡལ།	'ju sgar grong rdal	513332100
Loqug Town (Loqung)	洛须镇	Luòxū Zhèn	ལོ་ཕྱུག་གྲོང་རྡལ།	lo phyug grong rdal	513332101
Sêrxü Town (Sênxü, Sexu)	色须镇	Sèxū Zhèn	སེར་ཤུལ་གྲོང་རྡལ།	ser shul grong rdal	513332102
Qagca Town (Xiazha)	虾扎镇	Xiāzhā Zhèn	ཕྱག་ཚ་གྲོང་རྡལ།	phyag tsha grong rdal	513332103
Woinbo Town (Wenbo)	温波镇	Wēnbō Zhèn	དབོན་པོ་གྲོང་རྡལ།	dbon po grong rdal	513332104
Bumnying Town (Mengyi)	蒙宜镇	Méngyí Zhèn	འབུམ་རྙིང་གྲོང་རྡལ།	'bum rnying grong rdal	513332105
Arigza Town (Arizha)	阿日扎镇	Ārìzhā Zhèn	ཨ་རིག་རྫ་གྲོང་རྡལ།	a rig rdza grong rdal	513332106
Townships
Zênda Township (Zhenda)	真达乡	Zhēndá Xiāng	རྩེ་མདའ་ཤང་།	rtse mda' shang	513332200
Pênda Township (Benda)	奔达乡	Bēndá Xiāng	བེ་མདའ་ཤང་།	be mda' shang	513332201
Zhêngko Township (Zhengke)	正科乡	Zhèngkē Xiāng	ཀྲེང་ཁོ་ཤང་།	kreng kho shang	513332202
Dêxungma Township (De'ongma, Derongma)	德荣马乡	Déróngmǎ Xiāng	སྡེ་གཞུང་མ་ཤང་།	sde gzhung ma shang	513332204
Chomsagabma Township (Changshagongma)	长沙贡马乡	Chángshāgóngmǎ Xiāng	ཁྲོམ་བཟའ་འགབ་མ་ཤང་།	khrom bza' 'gab ma shang	513332206
Gaxi Township (Gayi)	呷衣乡	Gāyī Xiāng	ཀ་བཞི་ཤང་།	ka bzhi shang	513332207
Gêmang Township (Gemeng)	格孟乡	Gémèng Xiāng	དགེ་མང་ཤང་།	dge mang shang	513332208
Xinrung Township (Xinrong)	新荣乡	Xīnróng Xiāng	ཤིན་རུང་ཤང་།	shin rung shang	513332210
Ju'nying Township (Yiniu)	宜牛乡	Yíniú Xiāng	འཇུ་རྙིང་ཤང་།	'ju rnying shang	513332211
Kyiu Township (Kyewu, Qiwu)	起坞乡	Qǐwū Xiāng	ཁྱེའུ་ཤང་།	khye'u shang	513332213
Choxükongma Township (Changxugongma)	长须贡马乡	Chángxūgòngmǎ Xiāng	ཁྲོ་ཤུལ་གོང་མ་ཤང་།	khro shul gong ma shang	513332215
Chomzagabma Township (Chomsakongma, Changshaganma)	长沙干马乡	Chángshāgānmǎ Xiāng	ཁྲོམ་རྫ་འགབ་མ་ཤང་།	khrom rdza 'gab ma shang	513332216
Choxügabma Township (Changxuganma)	长须干马乡	Chángxūgānmǎ Xiāng	ཁྲོ་ཤུལ་འགབ་མ་ཤང་།	khro shul 'gab ma shang	513332217
Waxü Township (Waxu)	瓦须乡	Wǎxū Xiāng	ཝ་ཤུལ་ཤང་།	wa shul shang	513332219

== Demographics ==
The population of the district was 62,408 inhabitants in 1999.

There are about 52,660 nomads in the district, or 77.6% of the population.

== Climate ==
Sêrxü County has an alpine climate (Köppen ETH) with short, mild and rainy summers, frigid and dry winters and a large diurnal temperature range in all seasons. Mean minima are below freezing for eight months of the year and frosts occur even in summer, whilst at the depth of winter mean minima approach −20 °C or −4 °F and can reach −30 °C or −22 °F.

Climate data for Sêrxü, elevation 4,200 m (13,800 ft), (1991–2020 normals, extremes 1981–2010)
Month	Jan	Feb	Mar	Apr	May	Jun	Jul	Aug	Sep	Oct	Nov	Dec	Year
Record high °C (°F)	12.1 (53.8)	10.2 (50.4)	14.8 (58.6)	17.5 (63.5)	20.7 (69.3)	23.1 (73.6)	23.5 (74.3)	22.6 (72.7)	21.7 (71.1)	19.1 (66.4)	12.5 (54.5)	10.0 (50.0)	23.5 (74.3)
Mean daily maximum °C (°F)	−2.4 (27.7)	0.0 (32.0)	3.3 (37.9)	7.2 (45.0)	11.0 (51.8)	14.0 (57.2)	16.0 (60.8)	15.9 (60.6)	13.3 (55.9)	7.4 (45.3)	2.4 (36.3)	−1.0 (30.2)	7.3 (45.1)
Daily mean °C (°F)	−11.5 (11.3)	−8.3 (17.1)	−4.3 (24.3)	0.0 (32.0)	3.9 (39.0)	7.4 (45.3)	9.3 (48.7)	8.7 (47.7)	5.9 (42.6)	0.0 (32.0)	−6.2 (20.8)	−10.5 (13.1)	−0.5 (31.1)
Mean daily minimum °C (°F)	−19.4 (−2.9)	−15.7 (3.7)	−10.8 (12.6)	−5.8 (21.6)	−1.8 (28.8)	2.4 (36.3)	3.8 (38.8)	2.8 (37.0)	0.6 (33.1)	−5.2 (22.6)	−13.0 (8.6)	−18.5 (−1.3)	−6.7 (19.9)
Record low °C (°F)	−37.2 (−35.0)	−31.8 (−25.2)	−27.5 (−17.5)	−15.9 (3.4)	−11.2 (11.8)	−6.0 (21.2)	−4.1 (24.6)	−7.9 (17.8)	−10.0 (14.0)	−20.3 (−4.5)	−30.3 (−22.5)	−37.8 (−36.0)	−37.8 (−36.0)
Average precipitation mm (inches)	7.5 (0.30)	10.0 (0.39)	16.7 (0.66)	28.8 (1.13)	62.0 (2.44)	108.6 (4.28)	118.3 (4.66)	92.1 (3.63)	92.6 (3.65)	46.4 (1.83)	6.9 (0.27)	4.0 (0.16)	593.9 (23.4)
Average precipitation days (≥ 0.1 mm)	6.7	7.9	12.5	15.4	20.3	23.8	20.8	18.5	20.8	16.0	6.5	4.8	174
Average snowy days	8.9	11.5	15.9	19.5	19.4	5.8	1.2	1.1	7.8	18.3	9.2	7.2	125.8
Average relative humidity (%)	45	45	48	55	62	68	68	69	71	67	53	46	58
Mean monthly sunshine hours	205.0	188.2	203.9	207.1	199.9	170.6	191.6	190.2	177.1	188.4	210.2	211.4	2,343.6
Percentage possible sunshine	64	60	55	53	46	40	44	47	48	54	68	68	54
Source: China Meteorological Administration
