= Glossary of the Maya civilisation =

This glossary lists terms often found or noted in scholarly literature on the Maya civilisation. It includes: phrases in or from Mayan languages, (Note: Including: words or phrases, loanwords or calques, whether anglicised or not, from Mayan directly or indirectly (via Spanish). For Mayan spelling in the Latin script: at least three orthographic systems exist, though those endorsed by the Academia de Lenguas Mayas (Guatemala) or Instituto de Lenguas Indígenas (Mexico) are preferred. Their preferred representation of both glottal stops and glottal consonants is the apostrophe (curved or straight), but some linguists maintain the distinction with ⟨ʔ⟩, ⟨7⟩ or ⟨?⟩, or by distinguishing curved and straight apostrophes. Hispanicised spelling and borrowings, in particular, may be disfavoured. Reconstructed words are flagged with asterisks ⟨*⟩ only, though some linguists distinguish different types with pound signs ⟨#⟩ (as in). Those using cover symbols are flagged with (Note: In this reconstruction or transcription, ⟨C⟩ or ⟨V⟩ are cover symbols for an undetermined consonant or vowel, respectively. For instance, proto-Mayan *'alVj is *'alaj, *'alej, *'alij, *'aloj, or *'aluj.). Transliterations or romanisations from the Maya script are unflagged (but usually identifiable via standard conventions), though those with undeciphered glyphs (represented with ⟨?⟩) are tagged with (Note: In this transliteration or romanisation, ⟨?⟩ is a wild card for an undeciphered glyph.). Standard conventions for these are: logograms rendered in all-capital letters ⟨ABC⟩ or ⟨abc⟩, syllabograms rendered in all-lowercase letters ⟨abc⟩, glyphs separated by hyphens ⟨-⟩, and glyph blocks separated by spaces ⟨ ⟩.) terms of art employed particularly by Mayanist scholars, and names of things or entities which predated the 18th century. (Note: Including: proper names or definite descriptions, whether endonyms or exonyms, of abstract or concrete things. The turn of the 18th century is the most commonly accepted endpoint of the Contact period, and marked the dissolution of the lastest known Postclassic polities.) It excludes: technical terms not used solely by Mayanists, names of individuals, (Note: See list of Maya people.) names of archaeological sites, (Note: See list of Maya archaeological sites.) and names of things or entities which only dated to or post-dated the 18th century. (Note: In this glossary, where a main term or variant form foo is derived from main term (root) bar, some (further) variant roots of foo are given only in the entry for bar. For instance: a variant root (Yukatek) of Yucatecan is listed only in Yucatec; some variant roots (Chol, Tzeltal, etc) of variant form Ch'olan–Tseltalan of Greater Tseltalan are listed only in Ch'ol or Tseltal. Furthermore, singular forms of main terms are preferably listed, and plural variants not shown, with exceptions (like diverging meanings, or preference in literature for the plural). Variant forms are listed alphabetically.)

== 0–9 ==
0
A digital Maya numeral for zero; shell in the glyphic script.
1
A digital Maya numeral for one; dot in the glyphic script. Linguistically reconstructed as *juun in proto-Mayan, plus *nah or *b'ah for first in Core Mayan or Southern Mayan, respectively.
5
A digital Maya numeral for five; bar in the glyphic script. Linguistically reconstructed as *ho'oob' in proto-Mayan, plus *rhoo' for fifth in Southern Mayan.
20
The base of the Maya numeral system. Linguistically reconstructed as *junwinaq in proto-Mayan, *junk'ahl in Core Mayan, plus postpounds *winaq or *k'ahl for multiplied by twenty in proto-Mayan or Southern Mayan, respectively.
260-day calendar

In archaeology and epigraphy, the Maya calendar of 20 months of 13 days each (260 days total). Thought to have been developed by the Olmecs, been adopted by Maya people by the middle Preclassic or late Preclassic, and to have involved day names.
365-day calendar

In archaeology and epigraphy, the Maya calendar of 18 months of 20 days each, plus one month of 5 days only (365 days total).
819-day calendar
In archaeology and epigraphy, a Maya calendar of 819 days total; associated with four cardinal points.

== A ==
Achi

1. A Mayan language (unclassified), or a dialect of the K'iche' language.
2. A Maya people.
3. Of or relating to these.
affect

In linguistics, a class of morphemes characteristic of Mayan languages; class of roots which may take derivational affixes to form words (either predicates or adverbs); describe sounds or actions (possibly jointly). Traditionally (since the 1970s) called affects, but more recently (2010s) termed expressives. Examples include ni'm for oomph! or to push in Mam, and puuq' for splash! or to spash in K'ichee'.
agriculture

In archaeology, agriculture in Maya science and technology; part of Mesoamerican agriculture.
agronomy
aj

In epigraphy and linguistics, a grammatical particle, prefix, or prepound characteristic of Maya honorifics. Linguistically reconstructed as the classifying prepound *'aj- in proto-Mayan, meaning male or relatively larger or stronger animate being.
ajaw

A common Maya honorific. Linguistically reconstructed in proto-Mayan as *'aajaaw, meaning lord or boss. Written as a-ja-wa, ajaw, or ajaw-wa in the glyphic script, for ajaw meaning lord or sovereign in Classic Mayan.
Akatek

1. A Q'anjob'alan language (accepted), or a Q'anjob'alan complex language (proposed).
2. A Maya people.
3. Of or relating to these.
alawtun

A derived Maya unit of time, made up of 20 kinchiltuns (equal to 400 kalabtuns, 8,000 piktuns, 160,000 bak'tuns, 3.200 million k'atuns, 64.000 million tuns, 1.152 billion winals, or 23.040 billion k'ins total).
Annals of the Cakchiquels

A work of Maya oral tradition; of the Kaqchikel people; attested in Contact records.
Archaic
1. A first-order subdivision of Maya history, and historical period in Maya chronology; part of the eponymous period in Mesoamerica; parent of the same in the Maya lowlands; in the pre-Columbian era. Traditionally dated 4000 BC to 2000 BC.
2. Of or relating to this.
architecture

In archaeology, architecture in Maya visual arts; part of Mesoamerican architecture.
Arte de las tres lenguas

A Contact record; by Spanish people (Francisco Ximenez); notably recognised that Mayan languages formed a language family.
artefact
arts

In anthropology, archaeology, epigraphy, and linguistics, the arts of Maya people; split into literary arts, performing arts, visual arts; result in creative works.
arts and sciences

astronomy

In anthropology and archaeology, astronomy in Maya sciences. Linguistic reconstructions suggest (Note: In: "Reconstructed vocabulary shows PM speakers to have been highly successful agriculturalists, with the maize complex at the core of a full range of Mesoamerican cultigens. The reconstructed vocabulary of PM reveals a culture characterized by various Mesoamerican cultigens and domestic animals, the maize complex, various Mesoamerican and Mayan items of material culture, aspects of commerce, its own ritual and religion, and social organization". And in: "Colors, sensations, types of eating, breakdowns of plant and animal taxonomies, kinship, social structure, and counting/numeration all have peculiar if not always unique Mayan configurations [in reconstructed lexicon]". But in: "As for the data that I have presented here [reconstructions], more inferences could be squeezed out of the data than what I have tried to do. I would urge the interested scholar with: While considering all the available relevant data, do not overinterpret it. For one thing, the data are not complete, and the results of a reconstruction are never complete".) the sun, moon, and stars were amongst the earliest celestial objects observed, possibly for timekeeping.
Awakatek

1. A Mamean language (accepted), or an Ixilan language (proposed).
2. A Maya people.
3. Of or relating to these.

== B ==
bak'tun

A derived Maya unit of time, made up of 20 k'atuns (equal to 400 tuns, 7,200 winals, or 144,000 k'ins total).
ballgame

In anthropology and archaeology, a Maya sport; form of Mesoamerican ballgame; involved ballcourts (form of Mesoamerican ballcourt), and rubber balls (form of Mesoamerican rubber balls).
behaviour

Books of the Chilam Balam

A series of works of Maya oral tradition; of the Yucatec people; attested in Contact records.
British

1. The English language.
2. One or any of the Germanic languages, including their pidgins or creoles.
3. British people.
4. Of or relating to these.
British contact
In anthropology, the social interaction(s) of Maya people and British people.
British people
1. One or any of the Germanic peoples, including (their descendants) in the New World.
2. One or any of the peoples who assimilated or acculturated to these in the New World.
3. Individuals therein.
buildings and structures
In archaeology, buildings and structures of Maya architecture. Linguistic reconstructions suggest the earliest such included houses, huts, bridges, and roads.

== C ==
calendar

The calendars of Maya calendrics; types of Mesoamerican calendars.
Calendar Round

In archaeology and epigraphy, the Maya calendar of 1,460 months of 13 days each (18,980 days total); product of the almanac and haab.
cave

ceramics

In archaeology and epigraphy, ceramics, pottery or ceramic art in Maya visual arts or sculpture; may contain inscriptions.
Ch'ol

1. A Ch'olan language.
2. A Maya people.
3. Of or relating to these.
Ch'olan

1. A first-order subdivision of the Greater Tseltalan languages.
2. An ancestral Maya people.
3. Of or relating to these.
Ch'olti'

1. A Ch'olan language; extinct.
2. A Maya people.
3. Of or relating to these.
Ch'orti'

1. A Ch'olan language.
2. A Maya people.
3. Of or relating to these.
Chalchiteko

1. A Mayan language (unclassified), or a dialect of the Awakatek language.
2. A Maya people.
3. Of or relating to these.
Chicomuseltec

1. A Huastecan language; extinct.
2. A Maya people.
3. Of or relating to these.
child

In anthropology, childhood in Maya families. Linguistic reconstructions suggest the earliest forms of childhood recognised may have been limited to early infancy.
Chontal

1. A Ch'olan language.
2. A Maya people.
3. Of or relating to these.
chronology

1. In archaeology, periodisation of Maya history; part of Mesoamerican chronology. Traditionally involves two historical eras (pre-Columbian, Columbian), six historical periods (Palaeoindian, Archaic, Preclassic, Classic, Postclassic, Contact), and various subdivisions of said periods. Alternatively involves other eras or periods (like prehistoric, historical, preceramic, and so on).
2. The same, by Maya people.
Chuj

1. A Chujean language.
2. A Maya people.
3. Of or relating to these.
Chujean

A first-order subdivision of the Greater Q'anjob'alan languages.
city

In archaeology, urban form of Maya settlements; centres of some of their polities.
civilisation

class

In anthropology and linguistics, social stratification in Maya society; split along socioeconomic (upper, lower, middle classes), ecclesiastic (clergy, laity), or political lines. Linguistic reconstructions suggest the earliest social distinctions recognised included wealth and privilege, as proto-Mayan is thought to have had terms for lords and servants, and Core Mayan for wealthy people, tribute or corvee labour, and slaves.
Classic

1. A first-order subdivision of Maya history, and historical period in Maya chronology; part of the eponymous period in Mesoamerica; parent of the same in the Maya lowlands; in the pre-Columbian era. Traditionally dated 250 to 900.
2. Of or relating to this.
Classic collapse

Classic Maya

1. An ancestral Maya people.
2. Of or relating to them.
Classic Mayan

The language(s) of the Maya script; prior thought extinct, but now (since 1990s or 2000s) deemed more likely ancestral to (a) Ch'olan language(s). Thought to have been a prestige language, possibly highly formalised and archaic.
clause

codex

1. Codices written in the Maya script; part of the Maya hieroglyphic corpus; form of Mesoamerican codices; few extant or known, dating to the Postclassic period.
2. The extant, known exemplars of the same.
collapse

colour
In archaeology, colours of Maya visual arts. Linguistic reconstructions suggest the proto-Maya people may have recognised at least five colours: black (*'ejq'), white (*saq), red (*kaq), yellow (*q'an), and grue (*ra'x).
Columbian

1. An historical era in the Maya area, and traditional era in Maya chronology followed the pre-Columbian era. Started in 1492.
2. Of or relating to this.
communication
In athropology and archaeology, communication(s) involving Maya people, or in their economies; part of communications in Mesoamerica.
concept
In anthropology, concepts of or by Maya people. Linguistic reconstructions suggest some of the earliest such named included existence, recognition, and dreams, plus those in specialised domains (sciences and the like).
conquest

Contact

1. A first-order subdivision of Maya history, and historical period in Maya chronology; part of the eponymous period in Mesoamerica; parent of the same in the Maya lowlands; in the Columbian era.
2. Of or relating to this, including British contact, Spanish contact.
coordinated clause
In epigraphy and linguistics, types of clauses characteristic of Classic Mayan, and common in the hieroglyphic corpus; formed by juxtaposition of two clauses of the same type, sans overt markers or morphological changes; may be a form of parataxis. For instance, noun phrases u-took' and u-pakal (for their flint or weapons and their shields in Classic Mayan, respectively) in the sentence ?-yi u-took'-u-pakal for their flint and shield or military might was vanquished. Similarly, verb phrases nahb'-ja and witz-ja (for to pool and to heap up in Classic Mayan, respectively) in the sentence nahb'-ja-u-ch'ich'-le witz-ja-u-jol-li for their blood pools and their skulls pile up.
cord

A Maya unit of measurement for length. Linguistically reconstructed in Core Mayan as *'eht.
Core Maya

1. An ancestral Maya people.
2. Of or relating to them.
Core Mayan

1. A first-order subdivision of the Mayan languages (accepted).
2. A first-order subdivision of the Southern Mayan languages (proposed); ancestral form thought to have split into ancestral forms of the Eastern Mayan and Western Mayan languages.
3. Of or relating to these.
cosmology
In anthropology and archaeology, the cosmology of Maya people; part of Mesoamerican cosmology.
Coxoh
1. A Mayan language (unclassified), or a dialect of the Tseltal language (possibly); likely extinct and scarcely attested in Contact records.
2. A Maya people.
3. Of or relating to these.
cuisine

In anthropology and archaeology, the cuisine of Maya people; part of Mesoamerican cuisine. Linguistic reconstructions suggest the earliest basic tastes recognised included sweetness, bitterness, saltiness, and sourness, and that early gastronomic techniques included grinding, broiling, toasting or roasting, crushing or squashing, and mashing with mortar and pestle, the latter especially of chillies and tomatoes. They further suggest: the proto-Maya may have used maize for dough, pinole, and a fermented drink, whilst their descendants further employed the cereal for atole and hominy. These and archaeological findings further suggest early consumption of maize kernels was relatively limited, increasing only from the middle Preclassic with the adoption of Mesoamerican masa (nixtamalised maize dough, ground thrice on a metate with a mano). Maize tortillas (of masa, cooked on a clay comal) are thought to have been an even later (late Postclassic) addition to the cuisine.
cultivation

cultivation of animals
In anthropolgy and archaeology, husbandry in Maya agriculture. Linguistic reconstructions suggest ancestral Maya peoples may have kept bees, dogs, and turkeys (see domestication).
cultivation of plants
In anthropolgy and archaeology, plant or crop farming in Maya agriculture. Linguistic reconstructions suggest ancestral Maya peoples may have farmed cacao, tobacco, pot herbs, pineapples, and most especially maize (see domestication).
cultivation of soil

culture

culture and society

== D ==
dance

In anthropology, dance in Maya performing arts.
date

day

1. A solar day.
2. A k'in, a base Maya unit of time. Written as k'in-ni in the glyphic script, meaning sun or day in Classic Mayan.
day name

In archaeology, epigraphy, and linguistics, day names in Maya calendrics. Linguistic reconstructions suggest the earliest such were adopted (with significant changes) from Mesoamerica during the spread of the 260-day calendar, with two classes of twenty day names each being the earliest such reconstructible. In Eastern Mayan (the first class), the reconstructible day names are: 1. *'iimox (a god?), 2. *'i'q' (wind), 3. *'ahq'ab'aal (night), 4. *k'aat (burning or net), 5. *kaan (snake), 6. *kameeh (dying?), 7. *kehj (deer), 8. *q'aneel (?), 9. *tohj (payment), 10. *tz'i' (dog), 11. *b'a'tz' (howler monkey), 12. *'eeh (tooth), 13. *'aaj (reed), 14. *hi'ix (a god?), 15. *tz'ikin (bird), 16. *'aj maq (a god?), 17. *no'oj (a god?), 18. *tinhahx (a god?), 19. *kahoq (storm), 20. *'aj puhb' (blowgunner). In Western Mayan (the other class), they are: 1. *'iimox (a god?), 2. *'i'q' (wind), 3. *wotanh (a god?), 4. *k'ana' (a god?), 5. *'ab'aq (a god?), 6. *tyox (a god?), 7. *kehj (deer), 8. *lanhb'at (a god?), 9. *muluC (water jar), 10. *'o'q (coyote), 11. *b'a'tz' (howler monkey), 12. *'ehub' (?), 13. *b'e'n (a god?), 14. *hi'ix (a god?), 15. *tz'ikin (bird), 16. *kab'in (wax), 17. *kab' (earth), 18. *tinhahx (a god?), 19. *kahoq (storm), 20. *'aajaaw (lord). These linguistic findings suggest Mesoamerican day names were separately adopted by ancestral Maya peoples (in various rather than a single instance), such that no single class of twenty such is reconstructible in ancestral Mayan.
deity

In anthropology and epigraphy, the deities of Maya religion and mythology.
demographics
In archaeology, demographics of the Maya area; part of pre-Columbian demographics (partly).
diphrastic kenning

1. In anthropology and linguistics, a primary form of Maya parallelism; ordered pairs of semantically related words which compound (and are regularly compounded) to convey a meaning more general than that conveyed by the words apart (like te' and tuun, or qatat and qanan); form of kenning; longstanding kennings include sky and earth for universe, wood and stone for architecture or construction, wind and rain for thunderstorm.
2. In linguistics, a type of compound in several Mayan languages; typically nominal, and rarely verbal or adjectival. For instance, qa-ti't qa-maam in K'ichee' for our grandparents (from noun stems ti't and maam meaning grandmother and grandfather, respectively).
disharmonic phonetic complement
In epigraphy and linguistics, a Maya phonetic complement whose vowel does not match the last vowel of the glyph it complements. For instance, in yo-ook-ki (mixed glyph block for one's leg in Classic Mayan), i in the phonetic complement ki does not match o in the logogram ook. Further disharmonic spellings include to-k'a, pa-ti, ti-la, mu-ku-yi (for flint knife, back or behind, tapir, and dove in Classic Mayan, respectively). Typically flag a long vowel, voiceless glottal fricative, or glottal stop in the syllable nucleus of the complemented glyph, though this use became rare in the late Classic.
dog
In anthropology and archaeology, dogs as regarded by Maya people; part of dogs in Mesoamerica. Linguistically reconstructed as *tz'i' in Core Mayan.
domestication
In anthropology and archaeology, the domestication of plants or animals in Maya agriculture; part of Mesoamerican plant domestication (partly). Linguistic reconstructions suggest early domestication (or adoption of existing cultivars or breeds) by proto-Maya (cacao, maize, tobacco), Core Maya (dog, pot herb), Southern Maya (domestic animal, honeybee), and Western Maya (domestic turkey, pineapple) people. The proto-Mayan lexicon is thought to have featured farming terms (*'iiyaanh for seed for sowing, *'aw for to sow), especially maize-related ones (*'alVj for maizefield, *'ix or *'ixi for to shell maize). The Core Mayan and Southern Mayan lexicons are thought to have further specialised these. From other Mayanist fields, further early domesticates (or adopted cultivars) are thought to have included goosefoot.
Dresden Codex

An extant Maya codex.
dynasty

== E ==
early Classic

1. A first-order subdivision of the Classic period.
2. Of or relating to this.
early Postclassic

1. A first-order subdivision of the Postclassic period.
2. Of or relating to this.
early Preclassic

1. A first-order subdivision of the Preclassic period.
2. Of or relating to this.
Eastern Maya

1. An ancestral Maya people.
2. Of or relating to them.
Eastern Mayan

1. A first-order subdivision of the Core Mayan languages (accepted), or of the Southern Mayan languages (proposed); ancestral form thought to have split into ancestral forms of the K'iche'an and Mamean languages.
2. Of or relating to this.
economy

education

employment

energy
In anthropology and archaeology, energy and its forms and use by Maya people. The earliest source is thought to have been fire, linguistically reconstructed as *q'ahq' in proto-Mayan.
engineering
In archaeology, engineering by Maya people; part of pre-Columbian engineering (partly).
entertainment and recreation

In anthropology, entertainment, leisure or recreation in Maya culture; includes dance, festivals, music, sport. Linguistic reconstructions of proto-Mayan suggest the earliest forms included music and dance, with later additions possibly including toys and singing.
entheogen

entity
environment

ethnic homeland
In anthropology, the place of Maya ethnogenesis; thought to have been coincident with the proto-Mayan homeland.
ethnogenesis
In anthropology, the ethnogenesis of Maya people; in the Maya homeland; thought to have been coincident with the emergence of proto-Mayan.

== F ==
fashion

In anthropology and archaeology, fashion in Maya visual arts; involve textiles. Linguistic reconstructions suggest early apparel included sewn cotton or agave articles (possibly dyed or embroidered), trousers or pants, beaded jewellery, and masks.
Fenton Vase

A Maya ceramic.
festival
In anthropology and archaeology, festivals in Maya entertainment and recreation; included feasts, forms of Mesoamerican feasts.
fishing
In anthropology and archaeology, fishing in Maya hunting and gathering. Linguistic reconstructions suggest early fishing: *kara or *kari (to fish in Core Mayan), especially in the Maya lowlands, where fish may have been more abundant or accessible.
folklore

furniture

In archaeology, furniture in Maya households. Linguistic reconstructions suggest the earliest of these included mats, beds, and seats.
future

In anthropology and archaeology, the future as understood by Maya people. Linguistic reconstructions suggest endings in particular were recognised, with *laaj for to come to an end in Core Mayan, in addition to the immediate future.

== G ==
gender

In anthropology, gender or gender roles in Maya families; part of gender in Mesoamerica.
geography

1. The human or natural geography of the Maya area; part of Mesoamerican geography.
2. The same, as understood by Maya people. Linguistic reconstructions suggest the earliest recognised features included the earth, sky, coast, plains, bodies of water, and hills or mountains. They further suggest early techniques may have included surveying by foot.
glyph

In epigraphy and linguistics, the glyphs or graphemes making up the Maya script; either logograms or syllabograms, and not ideograms (as prior thought); may assume multiple visual forms (have allographs); are combined into glyph blocks.
glyph block
In epigraphy and linguistics, arrangements of Maya glyphs which form morphemes; they typically form one or more free morphemes each; they typically have glyphs arranged left-to-right and top-to-bottom, often with a spatially dominant main glyph (so visual form is fairly standardised); either logographic, syllabic, or mixed glyph blocks. For instance, the sentence chum-la-ja ti-ajaw-wa-le k'uk'-ajaw (for K'uk' Ajaw sits in kingship or accedes to the throne in Classic Mayan) is composed of three glyph blocks (chum-la-ja, ti-ajaw-wa-le, and k'uk'-ajaw, mixed and logographic). Similarly, the possessive phrase u tz'i b'a li (for its writing or its text in Classic Mayan) is composed of four glyph blocks (u, tz'i, b'a, and li, all syllabic).
glyphic script

The pre-Columbian writing system of Maya people; one of the Mesoamerican writing systems. First used in the late Preclassic, and most used in the Maya lowlands.
governance

graffito

In archaeology and epigraphy, graffiti in Maya visual art; may contain inscriptions.
Greater Q'anjob'alan

1. A first-order subdivision of the Western Mayan languages.
2. An ancestral Maya people.
3. Of or relating to these.
Greater Tseltalan

1. A first-order subdivision of the Western Mayan languages.
2. An ancestral Maya people.
3. Of or relating to these.

== H ==
health

In anthropology and archaeology, the health of Maya people. Linguistic reconstructions suggest the proto-Maya recognised generalised pain, inflammation, mange, and some disease vectors, whilst their descendants expanded on this.
highland

1. The Maya highlands.
2. Any highlands in the Maya area.
3. Of or relating to these.
highland Maya

1. Maya people of the Maya highlands.
2. Of or relating to these.
highland Mayan

1. The Mayan languages of the highland Maya, including ancestral.
2. Of or relating to these.
historical

1. An historical era in the Maya area, and possible era in Maya chronology from the introduction of writing in about 300 BC or 200 BC onwards; part of recorded history; spanning the pre-Columbian to Columbian eras.
2. The Columbian era only (wholly), or history from the Contact period onwards (inclusive).
3. Of or relating to these.
history

1. The history of the Maya civilisation; part of Mesoamerican history.
2. That of Maya people, or in the Maya area.
3. History by Maya people.
homeland

honorific
1. In linguistics, honorifics in Mayan languages.
2. Honorifics, titles, or styles of or used by Maya people.
Huastec

1. A Huastecan language.
2. A Maya people.
3. Of or relating to these.
Huastecan

1. A first-order subdivision of the Mayan languages.
2. An ancestral Maya people.
3. Of or relating to these.
Huave

In linguistics, a Mesoamerican language (unclassified) in the macro-Mayan hypothesis.
Huehuetenango linguistic area
In linguistics, a sprachbund of Mamean and Greater Q'anjob'alan (except Mocho', Tojol-ab'al) languages (accepted), or of Mamean Proper and Q'anjob'alan languages (proposed); in the Mesoamerican linguistic area.
hunting and gathering

In archaeology, hunting and gathering by Maya people; includes fishing. Linguistic reconstructions suggest early game and foraged goods may have included those from trees, palms, vines, herbs, and other wild plants.

== I ==
information
invention

In archaeology, discoveries, inventions or innovations in Maya science and technology; part of pre-Columbian inventions (partly).
Itzaj

1. A Yucatecan language; highly endangered.
2. A Maya people.
3. Of or relating to these.
Ixil

1. A Mamean language (accepted), or an Ixilan language (proposed).
2. A Maya people.
3. Of or relating to these.
Ixilan

A first-order subdivision of the Mamean languages (proposed).

== J ==
jade
In anthropology and archaeology, a Maya material; form of jade use in Mesoamerica.
jaguar
In anthropology and archaeology, jaguars as regarded by Maya people; part of jaguars in Mesoamerica.

== K ==
k'atun

A derived Maya unit of time, made up of 20 tuns (equal to 360 winals, or 7,200 k'ins total).
K'iche'

1. A K'iche'an Proper language.
2. A Maya people.
3. Of or relating to these.
K'iche'an

1. A first-order subdivision of the Eastern Mayan languages.
2. An ancestral Maya people.
3. Of or relating to these.
K'iche'an Proper

A first-order subdivision of the K'iche'an languages.
kalabtun

A derived Maya unit of time, made up of 20 piktuns (equal to 400 bak'tuns, 8,000 k'atuns, 160,000 tuns, 2.880 million winals, or 57.600 million k'ins total).
Kaqchikel

1. A K'iche'an Proper language.
2. A Maya people.
3. Of or relating to these.
kinchiltun

A derived Maya unit of time, made up of 20 kalabtuns (equal to 400 piktuns, 8,000 bak'tuns, 160,000 k'atuns, 3.200 million tuns, 57.600 million winals, or 1.152 billion k'ins total).
kinship

In anthropology, kinship, families or households in Maya society. Linguistic reconstructions suggest the earliest kin relations recognised may have been mostly maternal, filial, and extended spousal ones, and later expanded to encompass more paternal, fraternal or sororal, and immediate spousal relations.
knowledge
Kotoke complex
A first-order subdivision of the Q'anjob'alan languages (proposed).

== L ==
Lacandon

1. A Yucatecan language.
2. A Maya people.
3. Of or relating to these.
Landa alphabet

In epigraphy and linguistics, a correspondence of day names and month names in the Maya script to their equivalents in the Latin script; in Relacion de las cosas de Yucatan.
language

language contact

In linguistics, language contact involving Mayan languages, especially within linguistic areas; includes Spanish contact. Documented outcomes include borrowings and innovations in lexicons, morphologies, phonologies, syntaxes, and semantics.
late Classic

1. A first-order subdivision of the Classic period.
2. Of or relating to this.
late Postclassic

1. A first-order subdivision of the Postclassic period.
2. Of or relating to this.
late Preclassic

1. A first-order subdivision of the Preclassic period.
2. Of or relating to this.
Latin script

The Columbian writing system used by Maya people.
law
Lenkan

In linguistics, a family of Mesoamerican languages thought to have been in linguistic contact with Mayan languages; part of the Mesoamerican linguistic area.
LGBTQ

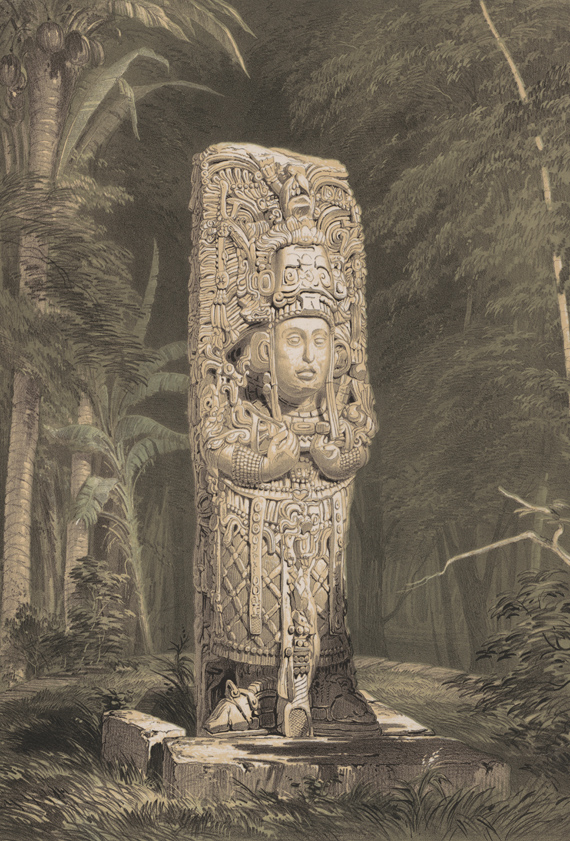
Waxaklajuun Ub'aah K'awiil in a net skirt of jade beads, deemed feminine apparel by some scholars (Copan stela)

In anthropology and archaeology, LGBTQ people in Maya families; involved gender roles. Recent (from 2000s) anthropological studies have proposed a third gender for elites who (in or by the Classic period) were allowed to (and regularly did) perform ceremonies traditionally associated with the opposite gender (contested). Mayanists have traditionally lent credence to Spanish accounts of non-heteronormative or non-cisnormative behaviour in or before the Contact period.
life
linguistic area

linguistic homeland

In linguistics, the urheimat of proto-Mayan; thought to have been in the Maya highlands, in an area bordering the southern lowlands, possibly around modern Uspantan.
literary art
In anthropology, archaeology, epigraphy, and linguistics, the literary form of Maya arts; include written (literature) and unwritten (oral tradition) forms; include fiction, non-fiction; include drama, poetry, prose, scripture; result in literary works.
literary device
In anthropology and linguistics, literary devices characteristic of Maya literary works or Maya performing works.
literature

1. In anthropology, archaeology, epigraphy, and linguistics, any written records or sources on Maya people; collectively form the Maya corpus.
2. Those by Maya people only; written form their literary arts; composed of written literary works; in the glyphic script or Latin script; collectively, the first part of the Maya corpus, and part of Mesoamerican literature; much not extant or known.
3. Those by other people (mostly Spanish people); collectively, the remaining part of the Maya corpus.
4. Those dating to the pre-Columbian era only; collectively form the hieroglyphic or pre-Columbian corpus (portion of the Maya corpus).
5. Those post-dating the same; collectively form the Contact or Columbian corpus (portion of the Maya corpus).
6. Extant, known examplars or portions of these.
logographic glyph

In epigraphy and linguistics, Maya glyphs which are logograms; follow a CVC (Note: In this syllable pattern, C and V stand for consonant and vowel, respectively. For instance, CVC refers to a syllable composed of a consonant (first), followed by a vowel, followed by a consonant (last).) or CVCVC sequence.
logographic glyph block
In epigraphy and linguistics, Maya glyph blocks composed of (a) logographic glyph(s) only. For instance, the glyph block usiij (vulture in Classic Mayan) has only the logogram usiij.
Long Count

In archaeology and epigraphy, the Maya calendar of 13 bak'tuns of 144,000 days each (1.872 million days total); type of Mesoamerican Long Count.
lower class
In anthropology, the lower classes in Maya social stratification, including slaves and peasants or commoners.
lowland

1. The Maya lowlands.
2. Any lowlands in the Maya area.
3. Of or relating to these.
lowland linguistic area

In linguistics, a sprachbund of Yucatecan and Ch'olan languages (accepted), or of these and Tseltalan languages (proposed); in the Mesoamerican linguistic area.
lowland Maya

1. Maya people of the Maya lowlands.
2. Of or relating to these.
lowland Mayan

1. The Mayan languages of the lowland Maya, including ancestral.
2. The languages of the lowland linguistic area, including ancestral.
3. Of or relating to these.
lunar calendar
In archaeology and epigraphy, a Maya calendar of 149 lunar months of circa 29 1/2 days each (4,400 days total); for astronomy.

== M ==
macro-Mayan

In linguistics, (a) proposal(s) linking the Mayan languages with Mixe–Zoquean languages (plausible), or with these and with Totonacan languages and (sometimes) with Huave (unsupported); form of macrofamily.
Madrid Codex

An extant Maya codex.
magic

In anthropology, magic in Maya culture. Linguistic reconstructions suggest early recognition of witchcraft, possibly involving copal incense and shape-shifting.
main glyph
In epigraphy and linguistics, a type of Maya glyph.
maize complex
Mam

1. A Mamean language (accepted), or a Mamean Proper language (proposed).
2. A Maya people.
3. A Postclassic polity of the Maya highlands (Saqulew centre).
4. Of or relating to these.
Mamean

1. A first-order subdivision of the Eastern Mayan languages.
2. An ancestral Maya people.
3. Of or relating to these.
Mamean Proper
A first-order subdivision of the Mamean languages (proposed).
maritime trade

In archaeology, maritime form of Maya trade or transport. Linguistic reconstructions suggest the earliest modes were dugout canoes or rafts (*jukuub' in Core Mayan, *tyem in Southern Mayan).
marriage
In anthropology, marriage in Maya families; form of pre-Columbian marriage (partly).
material

In anthropology and archaeology, the materials or resources exploited by Maya people. Linguistic reconstructions suggest the earliest such were biological (bark, straw, fibre, wood), and inorganic (stone, flint, obsidian).
mathematics

Maya

1. Maya people.
2. Of or relating to them.
Maya area

A first-order subdivision of Mesoamerica.
Maya Codex of Mexico

An extant Maya codex.
Maya highlands

A first-order subdivision of the Maya area.
Maya lowlands

A first-order subdivision of the Maya area.
Maya people

1. The Maya civilisation.
2. One or any of the Maya peoples.
3. Individuals therein.
Maya peoples

Peoples of the Maya area, as culturally, ethnically, socially, or politically classed; class of Mesoamerican peoples.
Maya settlement
1. The first departure of Maya people from the Maya homeland (to within the Maya area); succeeded Maya ethnogenesis.
2. Any later movement(s) by them.
3. Their first sedentary settlement(s), or any later sedentary settlement(s) by them. Linguistic reconstructions suggest possible early sedentarism, with *'aamaaq for town or village in Core Mayan.
Mayan

1. One or any of the Mayan languages.
2. Of or relating to these.
Mayan language

A family of languages of the Maya area; part of the Mesoamerican languages.
measurement

In anthropology and archaeology, metrology in Maya sciences; involve units of measurement. Linguistic reconstructions suggest the earliest units may have been the cord and span. They further suggest the earliest processes may have been simply counting and measuring.
measurement of time

In anthropology and archaeology, chronometry in Maya metrology; involve units of time. Linguistic reconstructions suggest early timekeeping by ancestral Maya people, as the Southern Mayan lexicon may have featured a name (*'ajq'iinh) for day-keeper or calendar priest, in addition to basic temporal concepts (in Southern Mayan and related ancestral Mayan languages). Generally, the earliest timekeeping tool available to them is thought to have been the 260-day almanac.
measurement system

In anthropology, the units of measurement of Maya metrology.
medicine

In anthropology and archaeology, medicine in Maya science and technology; may have included trepanation, a form of Mesoamerican trepanation. Linguistic reconstructions suggest early healthcare involved folk healers and medicinal herbs.
Mesoamerica

An historical region of North America.
Mesoamerican
1. People(s) of Mesoamerica, including individuals; class of pre-Columbian peoples (partly).
2. Of or relating to them, or to Mesoamerica.
Mesoamerican language

A family of languages of Mesoamerica.
Mesoamerican linguistic area

In linguistics, a sprachbund of Mesoamerican languages.
metal

In archaeology, a Maya material; form of metallurgy in Mesoamerica.
meteorology
In anthropology, meteorology in Maya sciences. Linguistic reconstructions suggest the earliest weather patterns recognised may have been thunder, rain, wind, lightning, frost, and hail.
middle Preclassic

1. A first-order subdivision of the Preclassic period.
2. Of or relating to this.
Mixe–Zoquean

In linguistics, a family of Mesoamerican languages in the macro-Mayan hypothesis, or thought to have been in linguistic contact with Mayan languages; part of the Mesoamerican linguistic area.
mixed glyph block
In epigraphy and linguistics, Maya glyph blocks composed of both (a) logographic glyph(s) and (a) syllabic glyph(s). For instance, the glyph block u-usiij-si-ja (vulture in Classic Mayan) has the logogram usiij, plus the syllabograms u, si, and ja.
Mocho'

1. A Q'anjob'alan language (accepted), or a Kotoke complex language (proposed); highly endangered.
2. A Maya people.
3. Of or relating to these.
monarch

In archaeology and epigraphy, monarchs in Maya royalty; formed dynasties; were heads of state or government of some polities.
month

1. A solar month (one-twelfths of a solar year).
2. A grouping of five days, a Maya unit of time.
2. A grouping of 13 days, a Maya unit of time.
3. A winal, a derived Maya unit of time made up of 20 k'ins.
Mopan

1. A Yucatecan language.
2. A Maya people.
3. Of or relating to these.
morpheme

music

In anthropology, music in Maya performing arts.
mythology

In anthropology and archaeology, the mythology of Maya people; notably included creation myths (forms of Mesoamerican creation myths), flood myths (forms of Mesoamerican flood myths), and world trees (forms of Mesoamerican world trees).

== N ==
Nahuan

In linguistics, a family of Mesoamerican languages thought to have been in linguistic contact with Mayan languages; part of the Mesoamerican linguistic area.
numeral

1. In epigraphy and linguistics, the numerical glyphs (shell, dot, bar, representing zero, one, five, respectively) of the Maya numeral system; types of glyphs.
2. Combinations of these to represent further numbers; types of numerals; part of the Maya numeral system. Ordinal and cardinal numerals for natural numbers (not zero) have been linguistically reconstructed for ancestral Mayan languages since proto-Mayan.
3. The numbers represented by these.
numeral system

In epigraphy and linguistics, the numeral system of Maya mathematics and measurement; a positional and vigesimal scheme. Linguistic reconstructions suggest the system may have been vigesimal early on, as proto-Mayan is thought to have featured a postpound (*winaq) for multiplied by twenty.

== O ==
obsidian
In archaeology, a Maya material; form of obsidian use in Mesoamerica.
Olmec

1. A Mesoamerican people, including individuals.
2. Of or relating to them, including Olmec influence.
oral tradition

In anthropology, the oral tradition of Maya performing arts, or oral form of their literary arts; composed of oral performances or oral literary works.
Oto-Manguean

In linguistics, a family of Mesoamerican languages thought to have been in linguistic contact with Mayan languages; part of the Mesoamerican linguistic area.

== P ==
painting

In archaeology, painting in Maya visual arts; part of pre-Columbian painting (partly); involved pigments (notably including Maya blue).
Palaeoindian

1. The first settlers of the Maya area; not a Maya people.
2. A first-order subdivision of Maya history, and historical period in Maya chronology; part of the eponymous period in Mesoamerica; parent of the same in the Maya lowlands; in the pre-Columbian era. Traditionally dated to 4000 BC.
3. Of or related to these.
Palaeoindian settlement
1. The first arrival of Palaeoindian people in the Maya area (from without); preceded Maya ethnogenesis; part of the settlement of the Americas.
2. Any later movement(s) by them.
3. Their first sedentary settlement(s), or any later sedentary settlement(s) by them.
paper

In anthropology and archaeolgy, paper made and used by Maya people; form of their crafts and of Mesoamerican bark paper. Linguistic reconstructions suggest the proto-Mayan *hu'nh shifted from meaning ficus to bark paper and book by the late Preclassic.
parallelism
In anthropology and linguistics, a primary class of Maya literary devices; generally emphasise syntactic and semantic forms of parallelism, and not phonological ones (like rhyme, metre).
Paris Codex

An extant Maya codex.
past

In anthropology and archaeology, the past as understood by Maya people. Linguistic reconstructions suggest it was simply split into the immediate and distant past early on: *'eewii or *'eewiir for yesterday, *juunha'b'eer for a year ago, and *'oonheer for before or a long time ago, all in Core Mayan.
people

performing art
In anthropology, the performing form of Maya arts; include dance, music, theatre; may include oral tradition; result in performances or performing works.
person marker

In linguistics, person markers characteristic of Mayan languages.
philosophy
phonetic complement

In epigraphy and linguistics, (a) Maya syllabogram(s) which complement(s) an accompanying (in a glyph block) logogram or syllabogram; type of phonetic complement; may be disharmonic or synharmonic. Typically, syllabograms accompanying a logogram in a glyph block are phonetic complements. For instance, the logogram (a vulture's head) for vulture in Classic Mayan may read as usiij or as k'uuch in a logographic glyph block (has no phonetic complement), but must be read as usiij in the mixed glyph block u-usiij-si-ja (with complements).
piktun

A derived Maya unit of time, made up of 20 bak'tuns (equal to 400 k'atuns, 8,000 tuns, 144,000 winals, or 2.880 million k'ins total).
politics

polity

Polities of Maya people; includes Postclassic polities. Linguistic reconstructions suggest the earliest polities may have been Maya settlements, as ancestral Mayan languages are thought to have featured terms for villages, lords, tribute, and enemies.
Popol Wuj

A work of Maya oral tradition; of the K'iche' people; attested in Contact records.
Popti'

1. A Q'anjob'alan language (accepted), or a Q'anjob'alan complex language (proposed).
2. A Maya people.
3. Of or relating to these.
Poqom
A first-order subdivision of the K'iche'an languages.
Poqomam

1. A Poqom language.
2. A Maya people.
3. Of or relating to these.
Poqomchi'

1. A Poqom language.
2. A Maya people.
3. Of or relating to these.
positional

In linguistics, a class of morphemes characteristic of Mayan languages; a very large class of roots which must take a derivational affix to form words (either predicates or verbs); describe states of being (like position, form, constitution) of objects (and so are stative). Positional roots follow a CVC sequence, and are variously affixed (with -Vl in Cholan–Tseltalan, -VVl in Huastec, -an in Q'anjob'alan, -Vkbal in Yucatec, -Vl or -Vn in K'ichee', and so on). Examples (in Huastec) include chiniil for extended and rigid, mo'ool for thrown down, and kexeel for widened.
Postclassic

1. A first-order subdivision of Maya history, and historical period in Maya chronology; part of the eponymous period in Mesoamerica; parent of the same in the Maya lowlands; spanning the pre-Columbian to Columbian eras. Traditionally dated 900 to 1500.
2. Of or relating to this.
Postclassic polity

Maya polities of the Postclassic period.
pre-Columbian
1. An historical era in the Maya area, and traditional era in Maya chronology part of the eponymous era in the New World. Ended in 1492.
2. Of or relating to this.
Preclassic

1. A first-order subdivision of Maya history, and historical period in Maya chronology; part of the eponymous period in Mesoamerica; parent of the same in the Maya lowlands; in the pre-Columbian era. Traditionally dated 2000 BC to AD 250.
2. Of or relating to this.
prehistoric

1. An historical era in the Maya area, and possible era in Maya chronology prior to the introduction of writing in about 300 BC or 200 BC; part of prehistory; in the pre-Columbian era.
2. The pre-Columbian era itself (wholly), or history up to the Postclassic period (inclusive).
3. Of or relating to these.
priest

Princeton Vase

A Maya ceramic.
proto-

proto-Maya

1. An ancestral Maya people.
2. Of or relating to them.
proto-Mayan

1. In linguistics, the proto-language of (ancestral to) all Mayan languages; first emergence in the proto-Mayan homeland; thought to have split into ancestral forms of the Huastecan and Core Mayan languages (accepted), or of the former and Southern Mayan languages (proposed).
2. Of or relating to this.
pyramid
In archaeology, pyramids of Maya architecture; forms of Mesoamerican pyramids.

== Q ==
Q'anjob'al

1. A Q'anjob'alan language (accepted), or a Q'anjob'alan complex language (proposed); somewhat endangered.
2. A Maya people.
3. Of or relating to these.
Q'anjob'alan

1. A first-order subdivision of the Greater Q'anjob'alan languages.
2. An ancestral Maya people.
3. Of or relating to these.
Q'anjob'alan complex
A first-order subdivision of the Q'anjob'alan languages (proposed).
Q'eqchi'

1. A K'iche'an language (unclassified).
2. A Maya people.
3. Of or relating to these.
queen

In archaeology and epigraphy, queens regnant or consort in Maya royalty; type of monarch (in the former case).

== R ==
Rabinal
A Maya lineage, of the K'iche' people.
Rabinal Achi

A work of Maya oral tradition; of the Achi people; attested in Contact records.
Relacion de las cosas de Yucatan

A Contact record; by Spanish people (Diego de Landa); notably included the Landa alphabet.
relations

In anthropology, archaeology, and linguistics, relations or contact by Maya people or polities with those not of the Maya area; may have included diplomacy, foreign policy, or trade. Linguistic findings (of language contact) suggest Wastekans and Ch'olans were in close or frequent contact with northern Mesoamerican people by the Preclassic or during the Classic period, respectively.
relative clause
In epigraphy and linguistics, types of relative clauses characteristic of Classic Mayan, and common in the hieroglyphic corpus; formed by juxtaposition of two such clauses, rarely with morphological changes, and frequently marked with -iiy (a deictic marker for past tense); may be indistinguishable from nominal apposition. For instance, relative clauses u-kab'-ji-ya and tzak-wi-ya (for overseen by and who conjured in Classic Mayan, respectively) in the incomplete sentence u-kab'-ji-ya u-chan-nu-ti-ti'-k'ahk'-ajan-na ha-i tzak-wi-ya 18-u-b'aah chan-nu for overseen by the captor of Ti' K'ahk' Ajan, who conjured Waxaklajuun Ub'aah Chana'n.
religion

In anthropology and archaeology, religion of Maya people; form of Mesoamerican religion; involved priests.
religion and mythology

Ritual of the Bacabs

A Contact record; of the Yucatec people.
royalty

== S ==
sacrifice

In anthropology and archaeology, sacrifice in Maya religion.
Sakapultek

1. A K'iche'an Proper language.
2. A Maya people.
3. Of or relating to these.
science
In athropology, archaeology, epigraphy, and linguistics, the sciences of Maya people; split into applied (agronomy, metrology), formal (mathematics), and natural (astronomy, medicine, taxonomy) science.
science and technology

script

sculpture

set A

In linguistics, a class of Maya person markers which mark agents of transitive verbs, possessors of noun phrases, and complements of relational nouns; always precede the verb stem. In split-ergative Mayan languages (many), they may further mark agents of intransitive verbs (under certain conditions).
set B

In linguistics, a class of Maya person markers which mark agents of intransitive verbs, non-verbal predicates, and objects of transitive verbs; sometimes precede the verb stem, sometimes succeed it.
set C

In linguistics, a class of Maya person markers; unique to Ch'orti'.
settlement

Sipakapense

1. A K'iche'an Proper language.
2. A Maya people.
3. Of or relating to these.
site

slave

In anthropology, slaves or slavery in the Maya lower class; form of pre-Columbian slavery (partly).
society

Songs of Dzitbalche

A Contact record of the Yucatec people.
Southern Maya

1. An ancestral Maya people.
2. Of or relating to them.
Southern Mayan

1. A first-order subdivision of the Mayan languages (proposed); ancestral form thought to have split into ancestral forms of the Yucatecan and Core Mayan languages.
2. Of or relating to this.
spacetime

span

A Maya unit of measurement for length; a type of span. Linguistically reconstructed in proto-Mayan as *k'utub or *k'utuub.
Spanish

1. The Spanish language; thought to have been in linguistic contact with Mayan languages since the Contact period.
2. One or any of the Romance languages, including their pidgins or creoles.
3. Spanish people.
4. Of or relating to these.
Spanish contact
1. In anthropology, the social interaction(s) of Maya people and Spanish people; included the Columbian exchange (partly), conquest, proselytisation.
2. In linguistics, the linguistic contact of Mayan languages and the Spanish language.
Spanish people
1. One or any of the Romance peoples, including (their descendants) in the New World.
2. One or any of the peoples who assimilated or acculturated to these in the New World.
3. Individuals therein.
sport
In anthropology and archaeology, sport in Maya entertainment and recreation; notably included the ballgame.
status suffix

In linguistics, suffixes characteristic of Mayan languages; mark transitivity, aspect, mood, or derivational status (derived versus inflected), in varying combinations and degrees.
stela

In archaeology and epigraphy, stelae in Maya sculpture; usually contain inscriptions.
syllabic glyph

In epigraphy and linguistics, Maya glyphs which are syllabograms; follow a CV sequence.
syllabic glyph block

In epigraphy and linguistics, Maya glyph blocks composed of (a) syllabic glyph(s) only. For instance, the glyph block u-si-ja (vulture in Classic Mayan) has only the syllabograms u, si, and ja.
synharmonic phonetic complement
In epigraphy and linguistics, a Maya phonetic complement whose vowel matches the last vowel of the glyph it complements. For instance, in yo-ko (syllabic glyph block for one's leg in Classic Mayan), o in the phonetic complement ko matches o in the syllabogram yo. Further synharmonic spellings include ch'o-ko, la-ka-ma, ku-tzu (for youth, banner, and turkey in Classic Mayan, respectively). They increasingly displaced disharmonic spellings in typical use cases in the late Classic.
syntactic couplet
In anthropology and linguistics, a primary form of Maya parallelism; adjacent pairs of lines (or couplet members) with identical syntactic structure but differing material within one (or more) constituents; form of syntactic parallelism; pairs traditionally formed via a single lexical substitution resulting in the differing constituents being semantically related (as in utz'apil te', utz'apil tuun, where te' and tuun are a diphrastic kenning, or in qatz ku are lal kamel / lal sachel, where kamel and sachel are near synonyms).

== T ==
taxonomy

In anthropology and linguistics, biological taxonomy in Maya science; part of Mesoamerican taxonomy. Proto-Mayan reconstructions suggest at least three taxonomic ranks were recognised by proto-Maya people: the top-level *nooq (animal) and *b'aq' (plant); the mid-level *tz'ikin (bird), *tyee' (tree), *'apak' (palm), and *'a'q' (vine); and at least 350 subspecies, species, or genera in the lower-level rank. Linguistic reconstructions further suggest the middle rank was later modified or augmented by the Southern Maya (with classes for domestic animal, female bird, male bird, fish, grass) and Core Maya (for herb, pot herb, grass) people. The bottom rank is similarly thought to have later grown.
technology

In archaeology, technology of or used by Maya people; part of Mesoamerican technology; involve agriculture, arts, cuisine, energy, geography, invention, materials, medicine, transport, tools, warfare.
Tektitek

1. A Mamean language (accepted), or a Mamean Proper language (proposed).
2. A Maya people.
3. Of or relating to these.
terminal Classic

1. A first-order subdivision of the Classic period; part of the eponymous period in Mesoamerica.
2. Of or relating to this.
terminal Preclassic

1. A first-order subdivision of the Preclassic period.
2. Of or relating to this.
textile

In anthropology and archaeology, the textiles of Maya clothing; involve textile arts, a form of the visual arts. Linguistic reconstructions suggest the earliest fabrics included ones woven (and possibly dyed or embroidered) from cotton and agave fibres. These were also the fabrics reported across Mesoamerica in the Contact period, with cotton now a sumptuary good reserved for the upper classes.
time

Tojol-ab'al

1. A Chujean language (accepted), or a Greater Tseltalan language (proposed).
2. A Maya people.
3. Of or relating to these.
Tol

In linguistics, a Mesoamerican language which may have been in linguistic contact with Mayan languages.
tool

In anthropology and archaeology, material tools or implements of or used in Maya technology. Linguistic reconstructions suggest the earliest such included general ones (rope, axes, ladders), plus various specialised ones (in cuisine, fashion, and like fields).
Totonacan

In linguistics, a family of Mesoamerican languages in the macro-Mayan hypothesis, or thought to have been in linguistic contact with Mayan languages; part of the Mesoamerican linguistic area.
trade

In anthropology and archaeology, trade in Maya economies; includes maritime trade. Linguistic reconstructions of proto-Mayan suggest at least some commerce was recognised early on (possibly or likely barter): *jal for to exchange something, *k'aay for sale, and *k'aayi for to sell something. The same further suggest later Core Maya and Southern Maya people developed concepts of theft, loan, payment, debt, purchase, market, and gift.
transport
In anthropology and archaeology, transport in Maya economies; includes maritime transport. Linguistic reconstructions suggest early modes included carrying by foot on roads.
Tseltal

1. A Tseltalan language.
2. A Maya people.
3. Of or relating to these.
Tseltalan

1. A first-order subdivision of the Greater Tseltalan languages.
2. An ancestral Maya people.
3. Of or relating to these.
Tsotsil

1. A Tseltalan language.
2. A Maya people.
3. Of or relating to these.
Tuzantec

1. A Mayan language (unclassified), or a Q'anjob'alan language (accepted), or a Kotoke complex language (proposed), or a dialect of the Mocho' language; highly endangered.
2. A Maya people.
3. Of or relating to these.
Tz'utujil

1. A K'iche'an Proper language.
2. A Maya people.
3. Of or relating to these.

== U ==
unit of time
In anthropology and archaeology, the units of time of Maya chronometry; temporal units of measurement. Linguistic reconstructions suggest the earliest units recognised may have been day (*q'iinh in proto-Mayan), with year added later (*ha'b' in Southern Mayan).
universe

upper class

In anthropology, the upper classes in Maya social stratification, including royalty and nobility or peerage.
Uspantek

1. A K'iche'an language (unclassified).
2. A Maya people.
3. Of or relating to these.

== V ==
Venusian calendar
In archaeology and epigraphy, a Maya calendar of five Venusian synodic periods of 584 days each (2,920 days total); for astronomy.
visual art

In anthropology and archaeology, the visual form of Maya arts; part of Mesoamerican art; include architecture, ceramics, fashion, painting, sculpture; may include graffiti; result in visual creative works or works of art.

== W ==
warfare

In anthropology, warfare in Maya politics or technology.
Western Maya

1. An ancestral Maya people.
2. Of or relating to them.
Western Mayan

1. A first-order subdivision of the Core Mayan languages (accepted), or of the Southern Mayan languages (proposed); ancestral form thought to have split into ancestral forms of the Greater Tseltalan and Greater Q'anjob'alan languages.
2. Of or relating to this.
woman

In anthropology and linguistics, womanhood in Maya families; involve gender roles. Linguistic reconstructions suggest proto-Mayan *'ix for female was further taken to mean smaller or weaker, whilst equivalent terms for man or male were further used for person or bigger or stronger.

== X ==
xib'alb'a

The underworld of Maya mythology; in K'iche'.
Xinkan

In linguistics, a family of Mesoamerican languages thought to have been in linguistic contact with Mayan languages; extinct.

== Y ==
year

1. A solar year.
2. A grouping of the days measured by a Maya calendar. Written as haab' in the glyphic script, meaning year or season in Classic Mayan.
3. A tun, a derived Maya unit of time made up of 18 winals (equal to 360 k'ins total).
Yucatec

1. A Yucatecan language.
2. A Maya people.
3. Of or relating to these.
Yucatecan

1. A first-order subdivision of the Core Mayan languages (accepted), or of the Southern Mayan languages (proposed).
2. An ancestral Maya people.
3. Of or relating to these.

== Z ==
Zapotec

In linguistics, a family of Zapotecan languages.
Zapotecan

In linguistics, a family of Oto-Manguean languages.

== See also ==
- Glossary of history
