= Naish languages =

Subgroup of three Sino-Tibetan languages

Naish
- Geographic distribution: Yunnan and Sichuan
- Linguistic classification: Sino-Tibetan: Tibeto-Burman; Loloish or Qiangic (?); Naic; Naish
- Proto-language: Proto-Naish
- Subdivisions: Naxi; Mosuo (Na); Laze

Language codes
- Glottolog: nais1236

The Naish languages are a low-level subgroup of Sino-Tibetan languages that include Naxi, Na (Mosuo), and Laze.

== Classification ==
The Naish languages are:

- Naish
  - Naxi
  - Na (Narua, Mosuo)
  - Laze

Arguments for relatedness include irregular morphotonology: tone patterns of numeral-plus-classifier phrases that constitute shared structural properties. Since these similarities are phonetically nontransparent, they cannot be due to borrowing.

Work towards further subgroupings remains to be carried out, notably to determine where the Malimasa language (dialect) fits within the Naish group.

In turn, Naish together with Namuyi and Shixing constitutes the Naic subgroup within Sino-Tibetan.

== Names ==
Note that in Mainland China, the term "Naxi" is commonly used for the entire language group, e.g. by the influential linguistic introduction by He and Jiang (2015). The terms "Naish" and "Naic" are derived from the endonym Na used by speakers of several of the languages. These concepts were initially proposed by Guillaume Jacques & Alexis Michaud (2011). Phylogenetic issues are summarized in the entry about the Naic subgroup. For a review of the literature about Naish languages, see Li (2015).

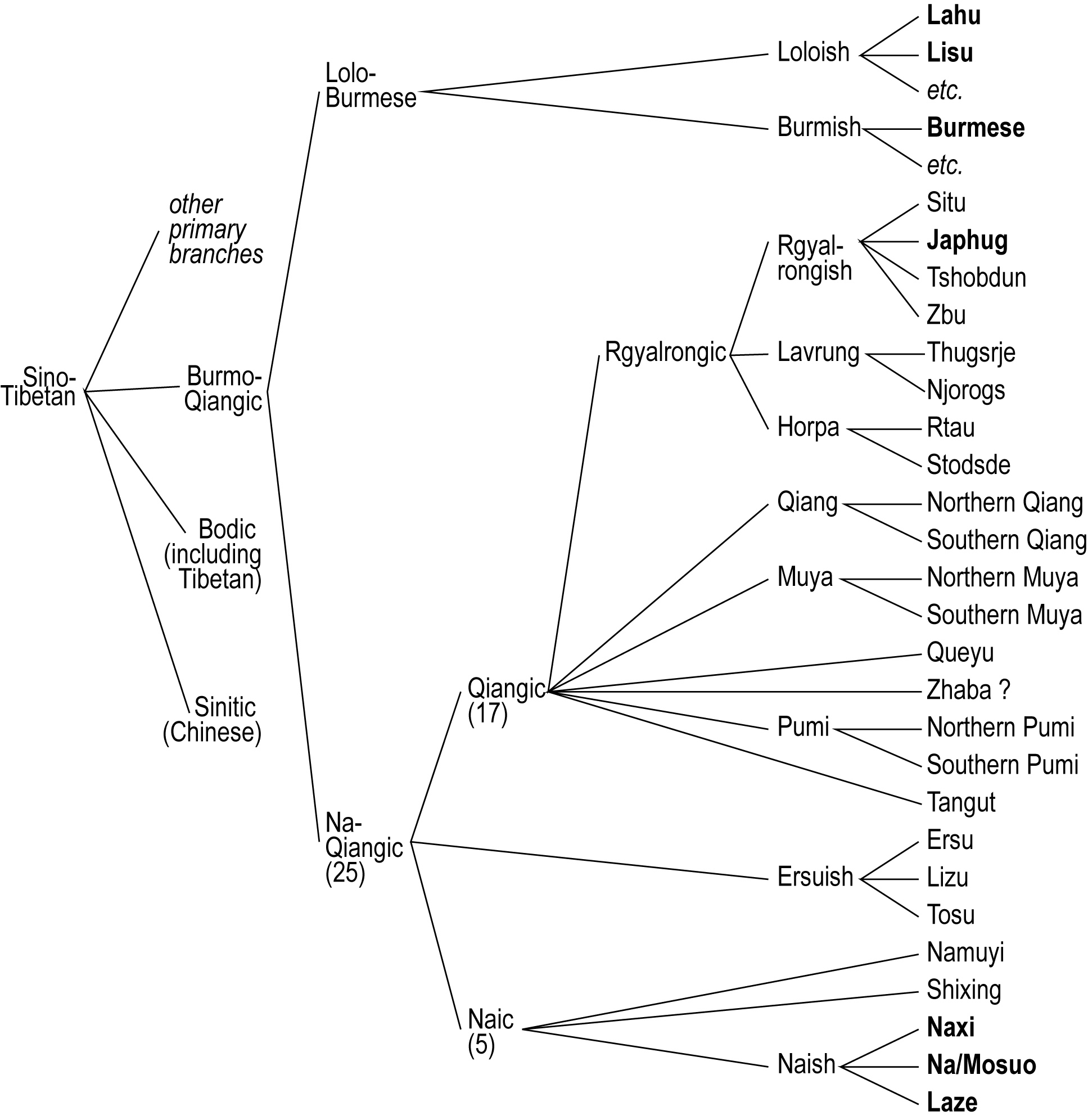
Tentative Sino-Tibetan family tree proposed by Jacques & Michaud (2011)

== Lexical innovations ==
Jacques & Michaud (2011) list the following words as Naish lexical innovations.

| Gloss | Naxi | Na | Laze | Proto-Naish |
|---|---|---|---|---|
| to stumble | pe˧ | k^{h}ɯ.pi^{M} | | *(S)pa |
| cloud | ki˩ | tɕi˧ | tɕi˩sɯ˥ | *ki |
| village | hi˧mbe˧ | fv̩.bi^{L} | ɖɯ˧bie˧ | *mba |
| Bai people | le˧bv̩˧ | ɬi.bv̩^{M} | | *Sla |
| noble | | sɯ.p^{h}i^{M} | sɯ˩p^{h}ie˩ | *si p^{h}a |
| medicine (2nd syllable) | ʈʂ^{h}ɚ˧ɯ˧ | ʈʂ^{h}æ.ɯ^{H} | ts^{h}ɯ˧fi˧ | *rts^{h}i Swri |

== Reconstruction ==
Proto-Naish, the proto-language ancestral to the Naish languages, has been reconstructed by Jacques & Michaud (2011). Another reconstruction of Proto-Naish by Zihe Li is in progress; he has published articles detailing open-syllable rhymes, laterals, pre-initials, and retroflex finals.

=== Phoneme inventory ===
The Proto-Naish consonant inventory is as follows:

Proto-Naish consonants
| Type | | Labial | Coronal | Dorsal | Uvular |
|---|---|---|---|---|---|
| Nasals | | *m | *n | *ŋ | |
| Stops | voiceless | *p | *t | *k | *q |
| Stops | voiced | *b | *d | *ɡ | |
| Stops | aspirated | *pʰ | *tʰ | *kʰ | *qʰ |
| Fricatives | | | *s *z *ɕ *ɕʰ | | |
| Affricates | | | *ts *tsʰ *tɕ *tɕʰ | | |
| Liquids and glides | | *w | *r *l *l̥ | *j | |

The Proto-Naish vowel inventory is disputed; Jacques and Michaud reconstruct seven vowels /æ ɑ i ĩ o ɔ u/ (notated in their paper with ⟨*a *aC_{1} *i *iN *o *aC_{2} *u⟩ respectively). On the other hand, Li reconstructs a simple five-vowel system /a e i o u/.

According to Jacques and Michaud, Proto-Naish syllables are exclusively open syllables, not counting the /ĩ/ rhyme spelled by Jacques and Michaud as *iN. This situation came about due to a total loss of all pre-Naish coda consonants without a trace; pre-Naish vowels in closed syllables have identical outcomes to their open-syllable counterparts. However, Li believes that there are enough traces of the lost consonants to reconstruct a proto-Naish with closed syllables.

=== Reflexes of vowels ===
The reflexes of vowels depend heavily on the preceding consonant. Jacques and Michaud employ the following cover symbols:

- K for velar stops
- TS for affricates and sibilants
- R for *r and clusters that result in retroflex consonants in attested Naish
- S for *r or *s

==== Jacques & Michaud ====
The vowel reflexes in Naish as charted by Jacques and Michaud are as follows.

Naish reflexes of Proto-Naish vowels (Jacques and Michaud)
| Vowel | Preceding consonant(s) | Naxi | Na | Laze |
|---|---|---|---|---|
| *æ | K | ɑ | ɑ | ɑ |
| *æ | TS | e | e | e |
| *æ | *w | ɯ | i | i |
| *æ | Velar + *w | ɑ | ɤ | ɤ |
| *æ | R | ɯ | e | ɯ |
| *æ | Elsewhere | e | i | ie |
| *ɑ | Everywhere | ɑ | ɑ | ɑ |
| *ɔ | Everywhere | o | o | u |
| *i | TS or R | ɯ | ɯ | ɯ |
| *i | *m | i | v̩ | v̩ |
| *i | *kr | ɯ | ɯ | i |
| *i | Elsewhere | i | i | i |
| *ĩ | Any cluster with *r; ɕ | ɚ | æ | æ |
| *ĩ | TS | ɚ | i | i |
| *u | TS | ɯ | i | y |
| *u | Labial stop + *r | ɚ | v̩ | v̩ |
| *u | Elsewhere | v̩ | v̩ | v̩ |
| *o | Everywhere | u | u | u |

==== Li ====
Li, who reconstructs only a five-vowel system /a e i o u/, charts the vowel reflexes as follows:

Naish reflexes of Proto-Naish vowels (Li)
| Vowel | Preceding consonant(s) | Naxi | Malimasa | Na |
|---|---|---|---|---|
| *a | K | ɑ | ɑ | ɑ |
| *a | TS | e | ɛ | e |
| *a | (C)w but not Pw or Kw | ɯ | ɯ | i |
| *a | Velar + *w | ɑ | ɑ | ɤ |
| *a | Labial + *w | u | ɑ | o |
| *a | R | ɯ | ɤ | e |
| *a | Preglottalized R | u | ɚ | e |
| *a | *mr- | ɯ | e | i |
| *a | Elsewhere | e | ɛ | i |
| *e | TS | i | ie | i |
| *e | K | ɯ | ɤ | i |
| *e | Cr | ɚ | ɚ | a |
| *e | *m | i | o | v̩ |
| *i | nj or Kj | i | i | i |
| *i | *Kr | ɯ | i | ɯ |
| *i | Elsewhere | ɯ | ɯ | ɯ |
| *o | Cr | ɚ | o | v̩ |
| *o | P | v̩ | o | v̩ |
| *o | Elsewhere | u | u | o |
| *u | TS | ɯ | v̩ | i |
| *u | *ɕ and *j | y | u | u |
| *u | *m | ɯ | v̩ | v̩ |
| *u | Elsewhere | v̩ | v̩ | v̩ |

Li also provides reflexes of various closed syllables he reconstructs:

Proto-Naish closed syllable reflexes
| Rhyme | Context | Naxi | Malimasa | Na |
|---|---|---|---|---|
| -ak | T- | ɑ | ɑ | ɑ (Note: Occasionally [o].) |
| -ak | Kw- (Note: Corresponds to Burmese wa after velars.) | ɑ | ɑ | ɤ |
| -ak | P- | u | ɑ | o |
| -ak | r- (Note: The *r- becomes /l/ in Malimasa but is deleted in Naxi and Na.) | a | a | a |
| -aɣ | T- | o | u | o |
| -aɣ | Cw- (Note: The *w- was lost in Naxi and Malimasa.) | ɚ | o | a |
| -aɣ | Kr-, Cj- | ɤ | ɤ | ɤ |
| -aɣ | Cr- (Note: Where C is not a velar.) | wɑ | o | wa |
| -eɣ (Note: Other members of this rhyme group reconstructed by Li have special developments. He also reconstructs this rhyme for Naxi /ʈʂɚ˥/, Malimasa /tsɯ˩˧go˩˧/, and Na /ʈʂa˧˥/ (meaning "ankle"), and for Naxi /tɕɚ˧pɚ˩/, Malimasa /ie˧ʈʂu˧/ and Na /ʁa˧ʈv˥/ (meaning "neck").) | s- | ɚ | i | i |
| -oɣ | (anywhere) | o | o | o |
| -at | (anywhere) | ɑ | ɑ | ɑ ~ a |
| -al | P- | ɤ | ɑ | ɤ |
| -al | Ts- | a | wa | wa |
| -al | Retroflexes (Note: This reflex also appears in Naxi /wa˧/, Malimasa /wa˧/ and Na /ʁwa˧/ "left side", which Li compares to Tibetan g.yon and Burmese way.) | wɑ | wa | wa |
| -el | s- | ɯ | ɚ | ɯ |
| -el | (elsewhere) | ɤ | ɤ | ɯ |
| -il | (anywhere) | ??? | i | o |
| -ul | Retroflexes | ɚ | o | ɻ̩ |
| -ul | (elsewhere) | ɯ | o | ɯ |
| -ap | TS (Note: Any affricate or fricative.) | y | y | i |
| -ap | (elsewhere) | o | u | o |
| -am | (anywhere) | a | a | a |

=== Reflexes of consonants ===
Naish features up to five series of stop corresponences: aspirated, voiceless, voiced, prenasalized voiced, and prenasalized voiceless.

Naish reflexes of Proto-Naish consonants
| Class | Proto-Naish | Naxi | Na | Laze |
|---|---|---|---|---|
| Labial stops | pʰ | pʰ | pʰ | pʰ |
| Labial stops | p | p | p | p |
| Labial stops | b | b | b | b |
| Labial stops | mb | mb | b | b |
| Labial stops | mp | p | b | b |
| Coronal stops | tʰ | tʰ | tʰ | tʰ |
| Coronal stops | t | t | t | t |
| Coronal stops | d | d | d | d |
| Coronal stops | nd | nd | d | d |
| Velar stops | kʰ | kʰ | kʰ (before *u, *o) qʰ (before *a, *ɔ) tɕʰ (before *i) | kʰ (most places) tsʰ (before *i) |
| Velar stops | k | k | k q (before *a) tɕ (before *i) | k q (before *a) tɕ (before *i) |
| Velar stops | g | g | g | g |
| Velar stops | ŋg | ŋg | g | g |
| Velar stops | ŋk | k | ʁ | (inconsistent) |
| Uvular stops | qʰ | kʰ | qʰ | qʰ |
| Uvular stops | q | ? | q | q |
| Uvular stops | ɴq | k | ʁ | ʁ |
| Sibilants | s | s | s | s |
| Sibilants | z | z | z | z |
| Sibilants | ɕ | ʂ | ʂ | ʂ |
| Affricates | tsʰ | tsʰ | tsʰ | tsʰ |
| Affricates | ts | ts | ts | ts |
| Affricates | dz | dz | dz | dz |
| Affricates | ndz | ndz | dz | dz |
| Affricates | tɕʰ | ʈʂʰ | ʈʂʰ | ʈʂʰ |
| Affricates | tɕ | k | tɕ | tɕ |
| Sonorants | l | l | l | l |
| Sonorants | l̥ | h | ɬ | ɬ |
| Sonorants | m | m | m | m |
| Sonorants | n | n | n | n |
| Sonorants | ŋ | ŋ | ŋ | ŋ |
| Sonorants | j | (lost) | ʑ | z |

=== Reflexes of consonant clusters ===
Proto-Naish possessed many syllable-initial consonant clusters that were simplified in the Naish languages.

==== Jacques and Michaud ====
In the following chart, the following cover symbols are used:

- S standing for *s or *r;
- C standing for a stop.
- N standing for a nasal consonant.

Reflexes of Proto-Naish consonant clusters
| Cluster type | Cluster | Naxi | Na | Laze |
|---|---|---|---|---|
| C_{1}C_{2} | Cb | b | (lost) | v |
| C_{1}C_{2} | Ck | ? | h | h |
| C_{1}C_{2} | Cg | g | (lost) | ? |
| S-initial | Sp | p | p | f |
| S-initial | Sb | b | b | (w) |
| S-initial | Smb | mb | b | v |
| S-initial | St | t | t | ʈ |
| S-initial | sk | k | k | f |
| S-initial | Sŋk | k | ʁ | (w) |
| S-initial | Sl | l | ɬ | ɬ |
| S-initial | SN | h | h | h |
| S-initial | Sw | h | h | f |
| Preserved Cw clusters | kʰw | kʰw | qʰw | kʰw |
| Preserved Cw clusters | ŋw | ? | ŋw | ŋw |
| Cr clusters | pr | p | p | p |
| Cr clusters | pʰr | pʰ | pʰ | pʰ |
| Cr clusters | br | b | b | b |
| Cr clusters | kr | k | k | ts |
| Cr clusters | tr | ʈʂ | ʈʂ | ʈʂ |
| Cr clusters | gr | g | g | ? |
| Cr clusters | Cŋkr | kj | ʁ | ʁ |
| Cr clusters | Cŋgr | ŋgj | ʁ | ʁ |
| R-initial | rl | l | ɻ | l |
| R-initial | rt | ? | ʈ | ? |
| R-initial | rd | nd | ɖ | ɖ |
| R-initial | rts | ʈʂ | ʈʂ | ts |
| R-initial | rtsʰ | ʈʂʰ | ʈʂʰ | tsʰ |
| R-initial | rs | ʂ | ʂ | s |
| Miscellaneous | Cdz | dz | z | z |

==== Li ====
Li's own analysis of consonant clusters is as follows. He reconstructs two types of pre-initial: homorganic nasal pre-initials, and a non-homorganic pre-initial *C_{1} (C in the below table).

Proto-Naish consonant clusters (Li)
| Class | Cluster | Naxi | | | Malimasa | Na | |
| Class | Cluster | Lijiang | Baoshan | Bowan | Malimasa | Ninglang | Yongning |
|---|---|---|---|---|---|---|---|
| C-initial | Cp | p | p | p | x | χ | p |
| C-initial | Cb | b | b | b | w | ʁ | b |
| C-initial | Cmb | b | b | mb | w | ʁ | b |
| C-initial | Cd | d | d | d | l | (lost) | d |
| C-initial | Cl | x | | | x | | ɬ |
| C-initial | Cdz | dʑ | dʑ | dz | tɕʰ | tɕʰ | dʑ |
| C-initial | Ck | k | k | k | (ɣ) | ʁ | ʁ |
| C-initial | Cg | k | k | g | (lost) | (lost) | ʁ |
| C-initial | Cng | g | ŋg | ŋg | (lost) | ʁ | ʁ |
| C-initial | Cq | k | q | k | ɣ | ʁ | ʁ |
| NC- | mb | b | mb | mb | (m)b | b | b |
| NC- | nd | d | nd | nd | (n)d | d | d |
| NC- | nl̥ | l | l | l | x | ɬ | ɬ |
| NC- | ŋg | g | ŋg | ŋg | (ŋ)g | g | g |
| NC- | ndz | dz | ndz | ndz | (n)dz | dz | dz |
| r-medial | pr | p | p | p | p or tʂ | p | p |
| r-medial | pʰr | pʰ | pʰ | pʰ | pʰ or tʂʰ | pʰ or tʂʰ | pʰ |
| r-medial | br | b | b | b | b | b | b |
| r-medial | mbr | b | mb | mb | b | b | b |
| r-medial | tr | t | t | t | tʂ | tʂ | t |
| r-medial | tʰr | tʰ | tʰ | tʰ | ʂ | ʂ | ʈ |
| r-medial | ndr | d | nɖ | nɖ | ɖ | ɖ | dʐ |
| r-medial | nr | n | ɳ | n | ɳ | ɳ | ɳ |
| r-medial | tsr | tʂ | tʂ | tʂ | ts | ts | tʂ |
| r-medial | tsʰr | tʂʰ | tʂʰ | tʂʰ | tsʰ | tsʰ | tʂʰ |
| r-medial | sr | ʂ | ʂ | ʂ | s | s | ʂ |
| r-medial | kr | k or tɕ | k or tɕ | k or c | tɕ or tʂ or k | tɕ or k | k |
| r-medial | kʰr | kʰ | kʰ | kʰ | tɕʰ | tɕʰ | kʰ |
| r-medial | gr | g | g | g | dʐ | dʐ | g |
| r-medial | ŋgr | g | ŋg | ŋg | dʐ | dʐ | g |
| r-medial | xr | x | x | h | ʂ | ʂ | x |
| Misc. | lj | l | | | ɭ/ʐ | | l/ʐ |

== See also ==
- List of Proto-Naish reconstructions (Wiktionary)
