= Naxi language =

Sino-Tibetan language spoken in China

Naxi
- Naqxi geezheeq
- Native to: South China
- Region: Yunnan and Sichuan
- Ethnicity: Nakhi, Mosuo
- Native speakers: (350,000 cited 2000 census – 2010)
- Language family: Sino-Tibetan: Tibeto-Burman; Loloish or Qiangic (?); Naic; Naish; Naxi
- Writing system: Naxi script (Geba script or Dongba augmented with Geba), Latin script, Fraser script Simplified Chinese (Rare) Traditional Chinese (Rare)

Official status
- Recognised minority language in: Mainland China

Language codes
- ISO 639-3: Either: nxq – Naxi nru – Narua (Yongning Na)
- Glottolog: naxi1245 Naxi naxi1246 additional bibliography yong1270 Narua
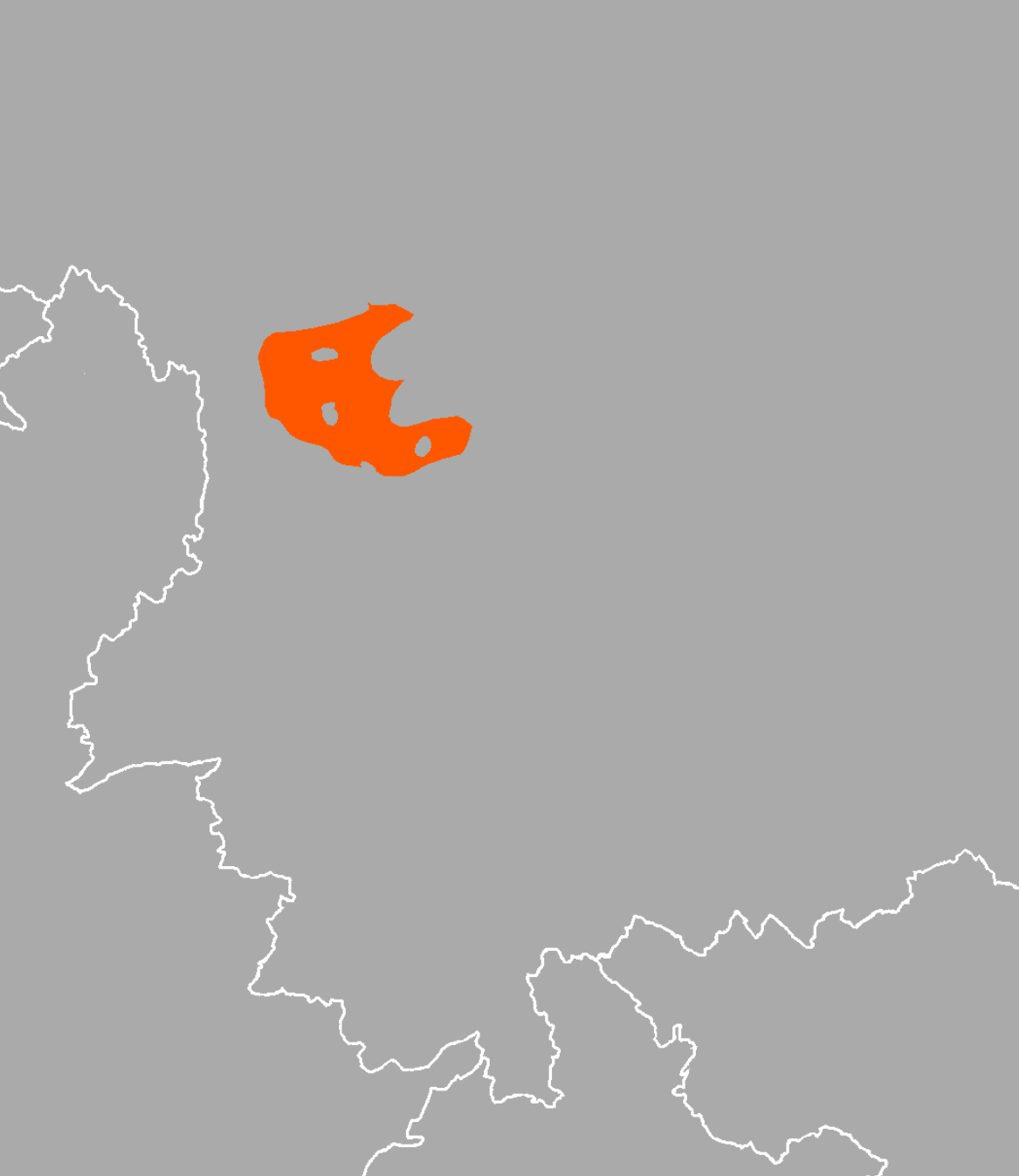
- Distribution of Naxi speakers

Naxi (Naxi pronunciation: [nɑ˨˩ ɕi˧˧]), also known as Nakhi, Nasi, Lomi, Moso, or Mo-su, is a Sino-Tibetan language or group of languages spoken by approximately 310,000 Nakhi people, most of whom live in or around Yulong Naxi Autonomous County in the province of Yunnan in South China.

== Classification ==
It is commonly proposed in Chinese scholarship that the Naic languages are Lolo-Burmese languages: for instance, Ziwo Lama (2012) classifies Naxi as part of a "Naxish" branch of Loloish.

However, as early as 1975, Sino-Tibetan linguist David Bradley pointed out that Naxi does not partake in the shared innovations that define Loloish. Thurgood and La Polla (2003) state that "The position of Naxi ... is still unclear despite much speculation" and leave it unclassified within Sino-Tibetan. Guillaume Jacques and Alexis Michaud (2011) classify Naxi within the Naish lower-level subgroup of Sino-Tibetan; in turn, Naish is part of Naic, itself part of a proposed "Na-Qiangic" branch.

== Dialects ==
Naxi in the broad sense (including Na/Mosuo) was initially split by the linguists He Jiren and Jiang Zhuyi into two major clusters, Western Naxi and Eastern Naxi.

Western Naxi (纳西语西部方言) is fairly homogeneous. It is spoken mainly in Lijiang, Zhongdian (Shangri-La), Weixi and Yongsheng counties. Smaller populations of Western Naxi speakers are found in Heqing, Jianchuan, Lanping, Deqin, Gongshan, Ninglang (in Bapijiang village 坝皮匠村, Yongning Township 永宁乡) Muli (in Eya 俄亚), Yanbian (Daoju 道咀) and Tibet (in Mangkang 芒康). There over 240,000 speakers total. Western Naxi consists of the Dayan, Lijiangba and Baoshanzhou dialects (He and Jiang 1985: 752).

- Dayan 大研镇: Within Lijiang County, this dialect is spoken in Dayan Town 大研镇 and also in Baishajie 白沙街, Shuhejie 束河街, Axi 阿喜, Daoxin 道新, Daoguzhai, 道古宅 and Guangzhai 光宅 by just over 50,000 people.
- Lijiangba 丽江坝: spoken mostly within Lijiang County, and in the counties of Zhongdian, Weixi, Yongsheng, Deqin, Gongshan, etc. by 180,000 people.
- Baoshanzhou 宝山州: spoken in Baoshan 宝山 and Guoluo 果洛 in Lijiang County by just over 10,000 people.

Eastern Naxi (纳西语东部方言), also known as 'Na', 'Mosuo' or 'Narua', consists of several mutually unintelligible varieties. It is spoken mainly in Ninglang, Yanyuan, Muli, and Yanbian counties. Eastern Naxi is also spoken by smaller populations in Yongsheng (in Zhangzidan 獐子旦), Weixi (in Qizong 其宗) and Lijiang (in Hailong 海龙 and Fengke 奉科) counties. There is a total of over 40,000 speakers (He and Jiang 1985: 754).

- Yongningba 永宁坝 (autonym: nɑ13 纳): spoken in Ninglang (in Yongningba 永宁坝) and Yanyuan. There is also a group of about 100 Naxi households in Weixi County who have the autonym mɑ33li55 mɑ33sɑ33. This language is referred to in English-language scholarship as Na or Narua.
- Beiquba 北渠坝 (autonym: nɑ33 xi33 纳恒): spoken in Ninglang (in Beiquba 北渠坝) and Yongsheng (in Xiaoping 哨平 and Zhangzidan 獐子旦).
- Guabie 瓜别 (autonym: nɑ33 zɯ33 纳汝): spoken in Yanbian (in Guabie 瓜别) and Muli (in Bo'ao 博凹 and Lie'ao 列凹).

== Usage ==
According to the 2000 Chinese census, 310,000 people speak Nakhi, and 100,000 of those are monolingual. Approximately 170,000 speak Chinese, Tibetan, Bai, or English as a second language. Most speakers live in Yunnan, but some are in Sichuan and Tibet, and it is possible that some live in Northern Myanmar.

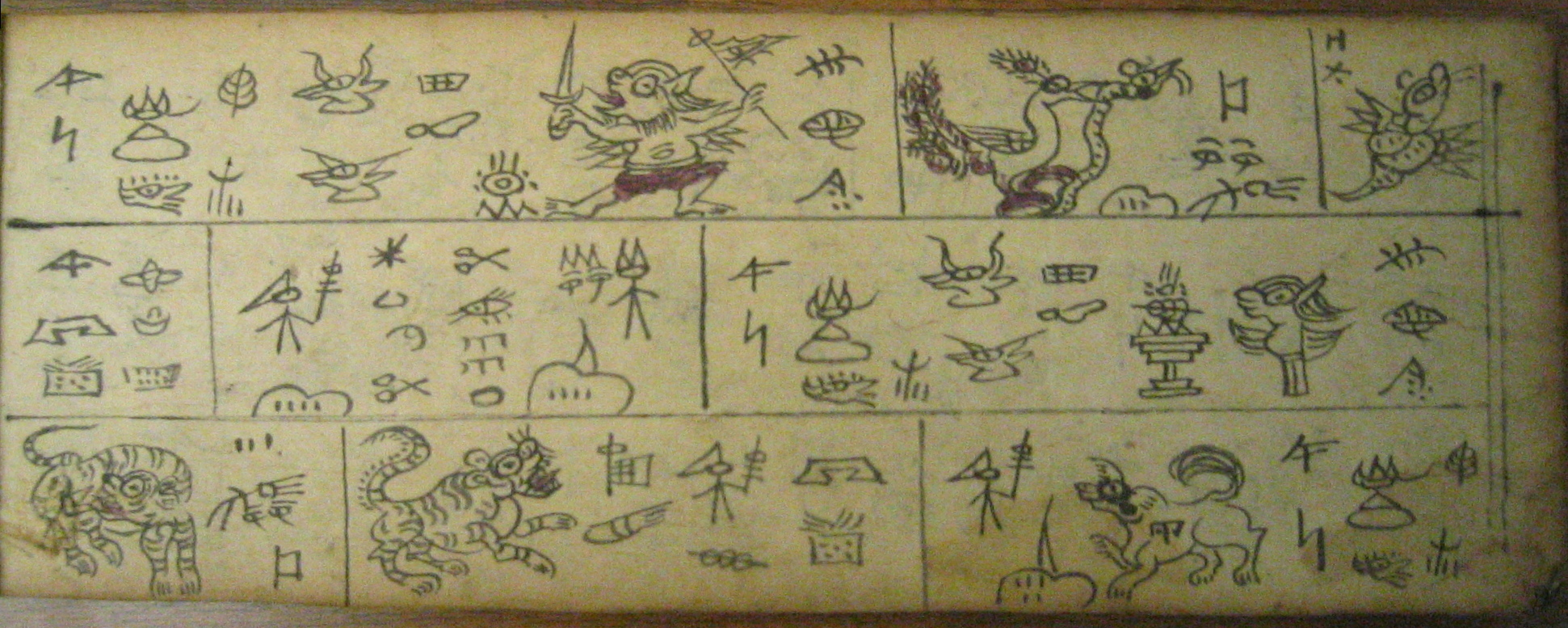
Naxi manuscript, displaying both pictographic dongba and smaller syllabic geba.

The language is commonly spoken among Nakhi people in everyday life and the language is in little danger of dying out soon, although the written literacy is still a rare skill. The language can be written in the Geba syllabary, Latin script or Fraser alphabet, but they are rarely used in everyday life and few people are able to read Naxi. There is also a Naxi tradition of pictographic symbols called dongba; this may sometimes be glossed with geba for clarification, since a dongba text may be intelligible only to its author. The 1932 Naxi Gospel of Mark was published by the British and Foreign Bible Society in the Fraser alphabet.

The three most common dialects are Lijiang, Lapao, and Lutien. Lijiang, which is spoken in the western parts of the language's range, is the most uniform of the three and it is heavily influenced by Standard Chinese and Yunnanese dialects, proved by its huge volume of loan words from Chinese. The eastern dialects are much more native and have many dialectal differences.

== Phonology ==
The alphabet used here is the 1957 pinyin alphabet.

=== Consonants ===
IPA and Naxi Pinyin orthography
		Labial	Dental/ Alveolar		Retroflex	Alveolo- Palatal	Palatal	Velar	Glottal
		Labial	plain	sibilant	Retroflex	Alveolo- Palatal	Palatal	Velar	Glottal
Nasal		m ⟨m⟩	n ⟨n⟩				ɲ ⟨ni⟩	ŋ ⟨ng⟩	
Plosive/ Affricate	voiceless	p ⟨b⟩	t ⟨d⟩	ts ⟨z⟩	tʂ ⟨zh⟩	tɕ ⟨j⟩	c ⟨?⟩	k ⟨g⟩	ʔ
Plosive/ Affricate	aspirated	pʰ ⟨p⟩	tʰ ⟨t⟩	tsʰ ⟨c⟩	tʂʰ ⟨ch⟩	tɕʰ ⟨q⟩	cʰ ⟨?⟩	kʰ ⟨k⟩	
Plosive/ Affricate	voiced	b ⟨bb⟩	d ⟨dd⟩	dz ⟨zz⟩	dʐ ⟨rh⟩	dʑ ⟨jj⟩	ɟ ⟨?⟩	ɡ ⟨gg⟩	
Plosive/ Affricate	prenasalized	ᵐb ⟨nb⟩	ⁿd ⟨nd⟩	ⁿdz ⟨nz⟩	ⁿdʐ ⟨nr⟩	ⁿdʑ ⟨nj⟩	ᶮɟ ⟨?⟩	ᵑɡ ⟨mg⟩	
Fricative	voiceless	f ⟨f⟩		s ⟨s⟩	ʂ ⟨sh⟩	ɕ ⟨x⟩		x ⟨h⟩	
Fricative	voiced	v ⟨v⟩		z ⟨ss⟩	ʐ ⟨r⟩	ʑ ⟨y⟩		ɣ ⟨w⟩	
Vibrant			r ⟨?⟩						
Approximant		ɥ ⟨iu⟩	l ⟨l⟩				j ⟨i⟩	w ⟨u⟩	

=== Vowels ===
	Front		Central	Back	
Close	i	y		ɯ	u
Mid	e		ə	o	
Open			a	ɑ	
Syllabic	v̩				

In the Lijiang dialect, there are nine vowels as well as syllabic /v̩/: /i, e, a, ɑ, y, ɯ, ə, o, u/, written i, ei, ai, a, iu, ee, e, o, u. There is also a final /əɹ/, written er.

=== Tones ===
There are four tones: high level, mid-level, low level (or falling), and, in a few words, high rising. The tones are written -l, -, -q, -f.

== Bibliography ==
- Bradley, David. 1975. "Nahsi and Proto-Burmese–Lolo." Linguistics of the Tibeto-Burman Area 2: 1.93–150.
- Bradley, David. 1997. "Tibeto-Burman languages and classification." Papers in Southeast Asian linguistics No.14: Tibeto-Burman languages of the Himalayas ed. by D. Bradley, 1–64. Canberra: Department of Linguistics, Research School of Pacific and Asian Studies, Australian National University.
- Fang Guoyu 方国瑜 and He Zhiwu 和志武. 1995. Nàxī Xiàngxíng Wénzì Pǔ (A dictionary of Naxi pictographic characters) (纳西象形文字谱). Kunming: Yunnan Renmin Chubanshe.
- Fu Maoji. 1944. A Study of the Moso Hieroglyphic Manuscript "The Genesis and History of Mankind", from Likiang (麗江麼些象形文’古事記’研究). Wuchang, Hubei: Wuchang University 武昌華中大學﹐中華民國三十七年.
- Fu Maoji. 1984. Nàxīyǔ Túhuà-wénzì "Bái biānfú qǔ jīng jì" yánjiū 纳西语图画文字 "白蝙蝠取经记" 研究 (A study of a Naxi pictographic manuscript, "White Bat's Search for Sacred Books"), Vol. 2. Tokyo: CAAAL.
- Guo Dalie 郭大烈 and He Zhiwu 和志武. 1999. Nàxīzú Shǐ 纳西族史 (A History of the Naxi people): Sichuan Minzu Chubanshe.
- He Jiren 和即仁 and Jiang Zhuyi 姜竹仪. 1985. Nàxīyǔ Jiǎnzh́ 纳西语简志 (A Presentation of the Naxi Language). Beijing: Minzu Chubanshe.
- He Zhiwu 和志武. 1987. Nàxīyǔ Jīchǔ Yǔfǎ 纳西语基础语法 (A Basic Grammar of Naxi). Kunming: Yunnan Minzu Chubanshe.
- Li Lincan 李霖灿, Zhang Kun 张琨, and He Cai 和才. 1953. Móxiē Xiàngxíng Wénzì zìdiǎn 麽些象形文字字典 (A dictionary of Naxi pictographs). Hong Kong: Shuowenshe. (New edition published by Yunnan Minzu Chubanshe in 2001 as "纳西象形标音文字字典".)
- Michailovsky, Boyd; Michaud, Alexis (2006). "Syllabic inventory of a Western Naxi dialect, and correspondence with Joseph F. Rock's transcriptions". Cahiers de Linguistique Asie Orientale. 35 (1): 3–21. doi:10.3406/clao.2006.1745.
- Michaud, Alexis. 2006. "Replicating in Naxi (Tibeto-Burman) an experiment designed for Yorùbá: An approach to 'prominence-sensitive prosody' vs. 'calculated prosody'", Proceedings of Speech Prosody 2006, Dresden. Available online. Archived 2021-03-23 at the Wayback Machine
- Michaud, Alexis. (2006). Three extreme cases of neutralisation: nasality, retroflexion and lip-rounding in Naxi. Cahiers de linguistique Asie Orientale 35, 23–55. Available online. Archived 2021-03-23 at the Wayback Machine
- Michaud, Alexis (2006). "Three extreme cases of neutralisation: nasality, retroflexion and lip-rounding in Naxi". Cahiers de Linguistique Asie Orientale. 35 (1): 23–55. doi:10.3406/clao.2006.1746.
- Michaud, Alexis (2006). Tonal reassociation and rising tonal contours in Naxi. Linguistics of the Tibeto-Burman Area 29, 61-94. Available online. Archived 2021-03-23 at the Wayback Machine
- Michaud, Alexis (2006) and He Xueguang. Reassociated tones and coalescent syllables in Naxi (Tibeto-Burman). Journal of the International Phonetic Association 37(3): 237–255 (2007). Available online. Archived 2021-03-23 at the Wayback Machine
- Ramsey, S. Robert (1987). The Languages of China. Princeton University Press, Princeton New Jersey ISBN 0-691-06694-9
- Rock, Joseph. 1963–1972. A Na-Khi–English encyclopedic dictionary. Roma: Instituto Italiano per il Medio ed Estremo Oriente.
- Matisoff, James A. 2003. Handbook of Proto-Tibeto-Burman: system and philosophy of Sino-Tibetan reconstruction Archived 2022-11-25 at the Wayback Machine. Berkeley & Los Angeles: University of California Press.
- Thurgood, Graham. 2003. "A subgrouping of the Sino-Tibetan languages: The interaction between language contact, change, and inheritance." The Sino-Tibetan languages ed. by G. Thurgood and R. LaPolla, 3–21. London: Routledge.
