= Alexis Michaud =

French linguist

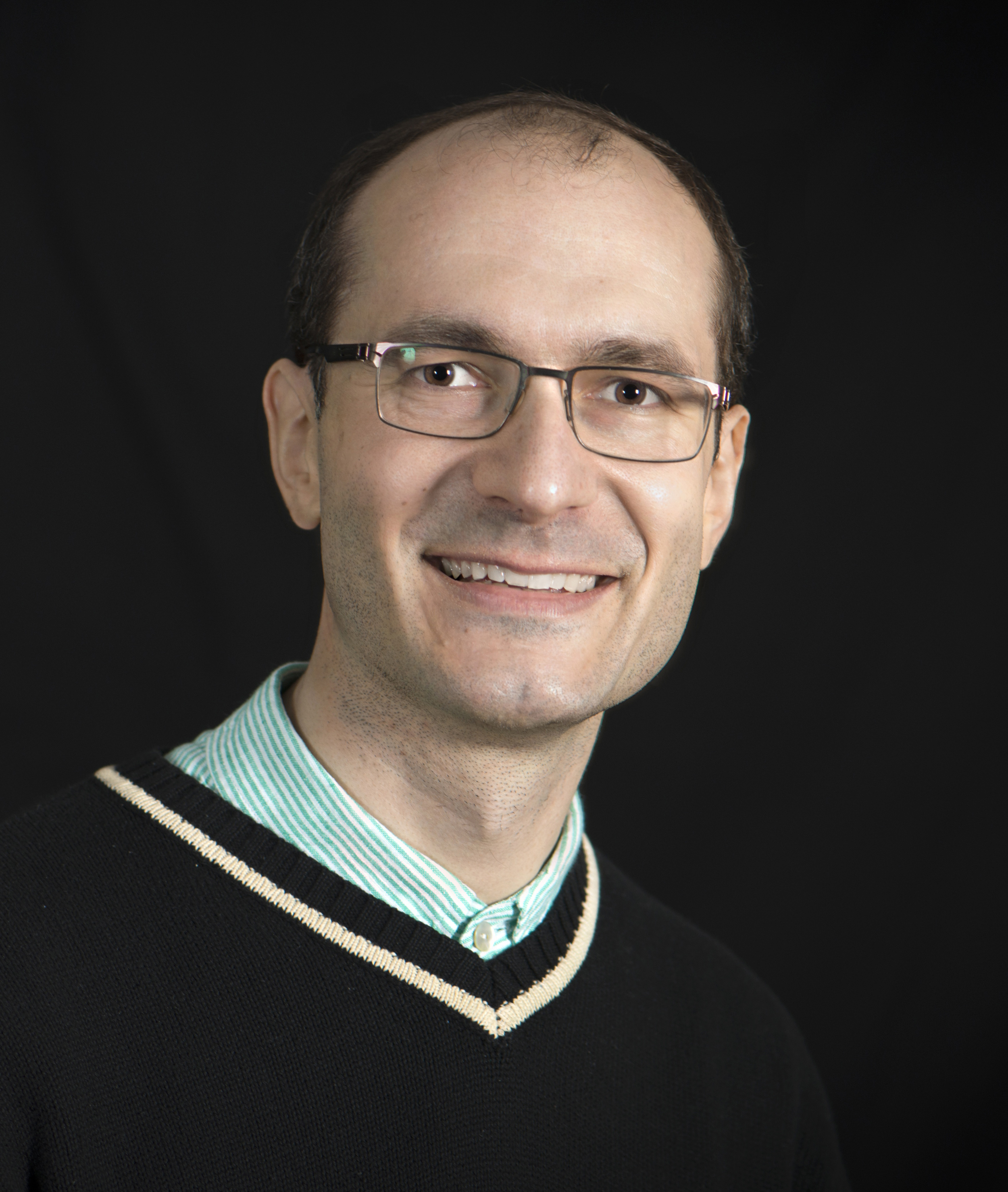
- Alexis Michaud
- Born: 1975 (age 50–51)
- Known for: study of Naxi, Na and Vietnamese
- Scientific career
- Fields: Linguistics, Phonology
- Institutions: LACITO, CNRS

Alexis Michaud is a French linguist specialising in the study of Southeast Asian languages, especially Naic languages and Vietnamese. He is also known for his work on the typology of tonal languages and as a foremost proponent of Panchronic phonology. He is one of the main editors of the Pangloss Collection. He works at the LACITO research centre within Centre National de la Recherche Scientifique.

He is member of the editorial board of journals such as Linguistics of the Tibeto-Burman Area and associate editor of the Journal of the International Phonetic Association.

A documentary film entitled Sound Hunter was made about his fieldwork in Yunnan, China.

== Selected publications ==
- Michaud, Alexis (2004). "Final consonants and glottalization: new perspectives from Hanoi Vietnamese" (PDF). Phonetica. 61 (2–3): 119–146. doi:10.1159/000082560. PMID 15662108. S2CID 462578.
- Michailovsky, Boyd; Michaud, Alexis (2006). "Syllabic inventory of a Western Naxi dialect, and correspondence with Joseph F. Rock's transcriptions". Cahiers de Linguistique Asie Orientale. 35 (1): 3–21. doi:10.3406/clao.2006.1745.
- Michaud, Alexis (2006). "Three extreme cases of neutralisation: nasality, retroflexion and lip-rounding in Naxi" (PDF). Cahiers de Linguistique Asie Orientale. 35 (1): 23–55. doi:10.3406/clao.2006.1746.
- Michaud, Alexis. 2006. “Replicating in Naxi (Tibeto-Burman) an experiment designed for Yorùbá: An approach to ‘prominence-sensitive prosody’ vs. ‘calculated prosody’”, Proceedings of Speech Prosody 2006, Dresden. Available online.
- Mazaudon, Martine; Michaud, Alexis (2008). "Tonal contrasts and initial consonants: a case study of Tamang, a 'missing link' in tonogenesis" (PDF). Phonetica. 65 (3): 231–256. doi:10.1159/000192794. PMID 19221453. S2CID 1573458.
- Michaud, Alexis; He, Xueguang (2009). "Reassociated tones and coalescent syllables in Naxi (Tibeto-Burman)" (PDF). Journal of the International Phonetic Association. 37 (3): 237–255. doi:10.1017/s002510030700309x. S2CID 43935110.
- Michaud, Alexis (2011). "The tones of numerals and numeral-plus-classifier phrases: on structural similarities between Naxi, Na and Laze". Linguistics of the Tibeto-Burman Area. 34 (1): 1–26.
- Jacques, Guillaume; Michaud, Alexis (2011). "Approaching the historical phonology of three highly eroded Sino-Tibetan languages: Naxi, Na and Laze". Diachronica. 28 (4): 468–498. doi:10.1075/dia.28.4.02jac. S2CID 54013956.
- Michaud, Alexis; Jacques, Guillaume; Rankin, Robert (2012). "Historical transfer of nasality between consonantal onset and vowel: from C to V or from V to C?" (PDF). Diachronica. 29 (2): 201–230. doi:10.1075/dia.29.2.04mic.
- Michaud, Alexis (2012), "Monosyllabicization: Patterns of Evolution in Asian Languages", in Nicole Nau; Thomas Stolz; Cornelia Stroh, Monosyllables: From Phonology to Typology, Berlin: Akademie Verlag, pp. 115–130.
- Michaud, Alexis (2015) Online Na-English-Chinese Dictionary, version 1.0
- Alexis Michaud 2017. Tone in Yongning Na: Lexical tones and morphotonology, Berlin: Language Science Press.
