= Laze language =

Naish language of Sichuan, China

Laze
- Muli Shuitian
- Pronunciation: lɑ33 ze33
- Native to: China
- Region: Sichuan
- Native speakers: 300 (2012)
- Language family: Sino-Tibetan: Tibeto-Burman; Loloish or Qiangic (?); Naic; Naish; Laze

Language codes
- ISO 639-3: None (mis)
- Glottolog: laze1238

Laze, rendered in Chinese as Lare (拉热) and Shuitianhua (水田话), is a language of the Naish subbranch of the Naic group of languages, spoken in Muli County, western Sichuan, China.

Laze is spoken by less than 300 fluent speakers in Xiangjiao Township 项脚乡 within Muli County (Michaud & Jacques 2012).

== Name ==
The name Laze (IPA: [lɑ33 ze33]) is likely to be a place name.
