= Naic languages =

Sino-Tibetan subfamily of southwest China

Naic
- Naxish
- Geographic distribution: Yunnan and Sichuan
- Linguistic classification: Sino-Tibetan: Burmo-Qiangic?; Lolo-Burmese or Na-Qiangic; Loloish or Qiangic; Naic
- Subdivisions: Namuyi; Shixing; Naish

Language codes
- Glottolog: naic1235

The Naic or Naxish languages are a group of Sino-Tibetan languages that include Naxi, Na (Mosuo), Laze (Muli Shuitian), Shixing (Xumi), and Namuyi (Namuzi). They have been variously classified as part of the Loloish or the Qiangic branch of Sino-Tibetan.

The name "Naic" is derived from the endonym Na used by speakers of several of the languages.

== Classification ==
=== Lama (2012) ===
Lama (2012) lists the following languages in his Naxish clade, which he places in the Loloish branch.

- Naxish
  - Namuzi (næ55 mu33 zɿ31)
  - Naxi (nɑ21 ɕi33)
    - Na: Mali Masa, Na (Moso)
    - etc.
      - Naru
      - Naheng, Naxi proper

Lama (2012) lists the following sound changes from Proto-Loloish as Naxish innovations.

- *sn > ȵ-
- *pw- > b-, ʁ-

=== Jacques & Michaud (2011), Chirkova (2012) ===
The Naic group (corresponding to Lama's Naxish clade) is classified as closely related to Qiangic and not as Loloish by Guillaume Jacques & Alexis Michaud (2011).

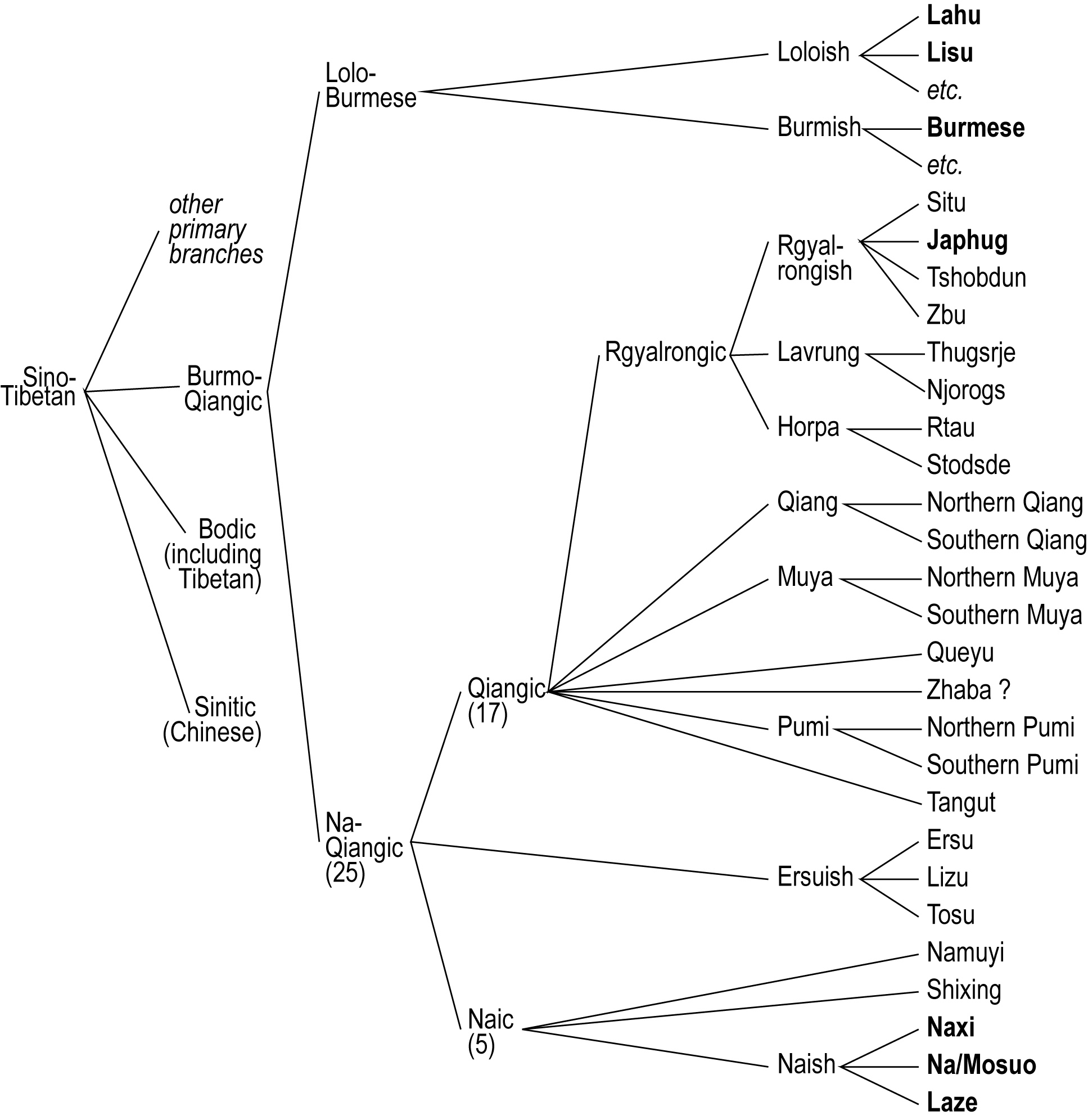
Tentative Sino-Tibetan family tree proposed by Jacques & Michaud (2011)

- Naic
  - Namuyi
  - Shixing
  - Naish
    - Naxi
    - Na
    - Laze

The argument is based on the discovery of cognates with Qiangic languages, that are superficially undetectable due to the high degree of phonological erosion of the Naic languages, but can be uncovered through a systematic examination of lexical correspondences. Progress in the reconstruction of rGyalrongic languages and other languages of the Qiangic branch offers an improved basis for reconstruction. For instance, it appears that Proto-Naish *-o corresponds both to Proto-Rgyalrong *-o and *-aŋ, suggesting a merger between a closed syllable and an open syllable.

Chirkova (2012) confirms that "Shixing displays significant similarity with Na [i.e. Naish] languages in all its linguistic subsystems and no comparable similarity with any other local language or group of languages" (p. 154). From a detailed comparison, the author concludes that "Shixing can be hypothesized to be a Na language that has undergone considerable restructuring" (p. 157).

=== Lidz (2010) ===
Lidz (2010) groups the Naxi varieties as follows, but does not consider where these languages fit within Sino-Tibetan. Lidz notes that the western groups call themselves "Naxi", whereas the eastern groups call themselves "Na" — hence the parentheses. Lidz (2010) also notes that the Na (Eastern) speakers of Sichuan are officially classified as ethnic Mongols by the Chinese government. Namuyi and Shixing are not addressed.

- Na(xi)
  - Western (Naxi)
    - Baoshanzhou 保山州
    - Dayanzhen 大研镇
    - Lijiang 丽江
  - Eastern (Na)
    - Ninglang 宁蒗 / Beiqu 北渠
    - Yongning 永宁
    - Guabie 瓜别
