= Winal =

Mayan unit of time

Standard glyph for winal

A winal (Mayan pronunciation: [wiˈnal]) or uinal is a unit of time in the Maya Long Count calendar equal to 20 days (or kʼin). It is the 4th digit on the Maya Long Count date and the second-smallest in length, with 18 winals making up a tun.

== Function ==
Winals form a unit in the Long Count calendar used by the Maya civilization, a linear counting of days from a creation date corresponding to August 14, 3114 BCE in the Gregorian calendar. These Long Count dates often open Maya texts as part of a series of glyphs called the Initial Series. The winal is the second-smallest unit of the Long Count, and is equivalent to 20 kʼin, or days. In turn, 18 winals make up 1 tun, also equivalent to 360 k'in, in the only exception to the otherwise base-20 system. The units, beginning with the baktun, are typically arranged in descending order, with the winal as the fourth and penultimate unit. Mayanists usually denote the Long Count with Arabic numbers separated by periods. For instance, in the date 12.19.14.1.6, the 1 coefficient represents the winal. In distance numbers, which link dates in inscriptions, the order is reversed, with the winal appearing second after the k'in. Distance numbers often conflate both k'in, winal, and their respective coefficients into a single glyph block.

== Depiction ==
The typical winal sign comprises three main elements: two beads at the top, a curl on the left and right, and a three-bumped item. It is identical to the glyph for winik, the Classic Maya word for the period, except for the triple cartouche in which the latter appears. It is possible that the sign has some connection with the moon.
