= Mesoamerican flood myths =

Many Mesoamerican flood myths have been documented in written form or passed down through in oral tradition. Some clearly have Torah influences, but others are believed by scholars to represent native flood myths of pre-Columbian origin.

One myth documented among the Tlapanec and Huaxtecs has a man and his dog as the sole survivors of the deluge, but the man finds out that the dog takes the shape of a woman during the day when he is away. The man and the dog-woman then repopulate the earth. Another myth found among the Aztec and Totonac peoples relates how a human couple survive by hiding in a hollow vessel and start to cook a fish when the water subsides. When the smoke reaches the heavens the gods become angry and punish them by turning them into dogs or monkeys depending on the version.

In Maya mythology as expressed in the Popol Vuh the creator gods attempted to create creatures who would worship them three times before finally succeeding in creating a race of humans that would pay proper homage to their creators. The three previous creations were destroyed. The third race of humans carved from wood were destroyed by a flood, mauled by wild animals and smashed by their own tools and utensils. Maya flood myths recorded by Diego de Landa and in the Chilam Balam of Chumayel holds that the only survivors of the flood were the four Bacabs who took their places as upholders of the four corners of the sky.

In Mesoamerican myth a variety of reasons are given for the occurrence of the flood: either the world was simply very old and needed to be renewed; the humans had neglected their duty to adore the gods; or they were punished for a transgression (cannibalism, for example). Many of the modern myths included obviously Christian references such as the murder of Abel by Cain as the reason. In Mesoamerican myth the flood was but one of several destructions of the creation — usually the first of three or four cataclysmic events, although there is some evidence that the Aztecs considered the flood to be the fourth.

In many Mesoamerican flood myths, especially recorded among the Nahua (Aztec), peoples tell that there were no survivors of the flood and creation had to start from scratch, while other accounts relate that current humans are descended from a small number of survivors. In some accounts the survivors transgress against the gods by lighting a fire and consequently are turned into animals. Horcasitas acknowledges that the dog-wife tale and the tale of transgression by fire and subsequent turning into animals of the flood survivors may be of pre-Columbian origin.
