= LACITO =

French multidisciplinary research organization

LACITO – CNRS
- Langues et Civilisations à Tradition Orale
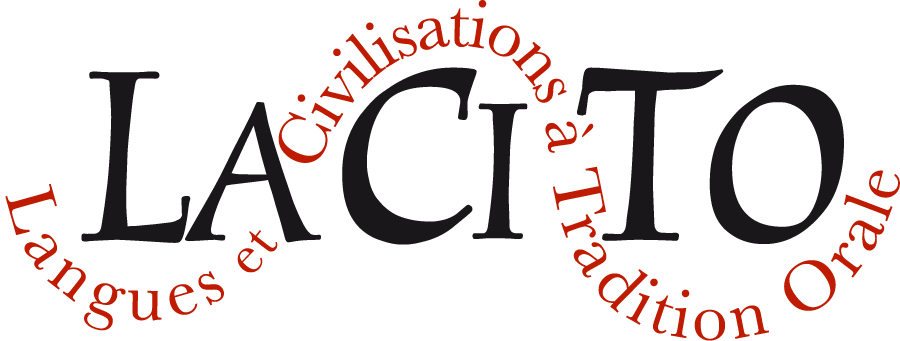
- Type: Public
- Established: 1976
- Affiliations: CNRS
- Director: Cécile Leguy
- Faculty: 24
- Administrative staff: 5
- Doctoral students: 15
- Location: Villejuif, Île-de-France, France
- Website: https://lacito.cnrs.fr

LACITO (Langues et Civilisations à Tradition Orale) is a multidisciplinary research organisation, principally devoted to the study of languages and civilizations with oral traditions.

LACITO is a branch of the French National Centre for Scientific Research (Centre National de la Recherche Scientifique (CNRS)), the principal network of researchers in France. It is thus occasionally referred to as LACITO–CNRS or CNRS–LACITO.

== Scientific activities ==
Created in 1976 by André-Georges Haudricourt, LACITO is specialized in the description, documentation and analysis of under-documented languages of the world. The members of LACITO are linguists and linguistic anthropologists.

The main perspective adopted by LACITO’s researchers is that of linguistic typology, as linguistic structures are compared in search of universals, yet with special attention to their diversity. Besides language documentation and grammatical description, research at LACITO also includes historical linguistics, lexicography, psycholinguistics, sociolinguistics, linguistic anthropology, verbal art and cultural diversity.

An important contribution of LACITO is the Pangloss Collection, for the preservation of valuable audio archives in the world's endangered languages.

== Language expertise ==
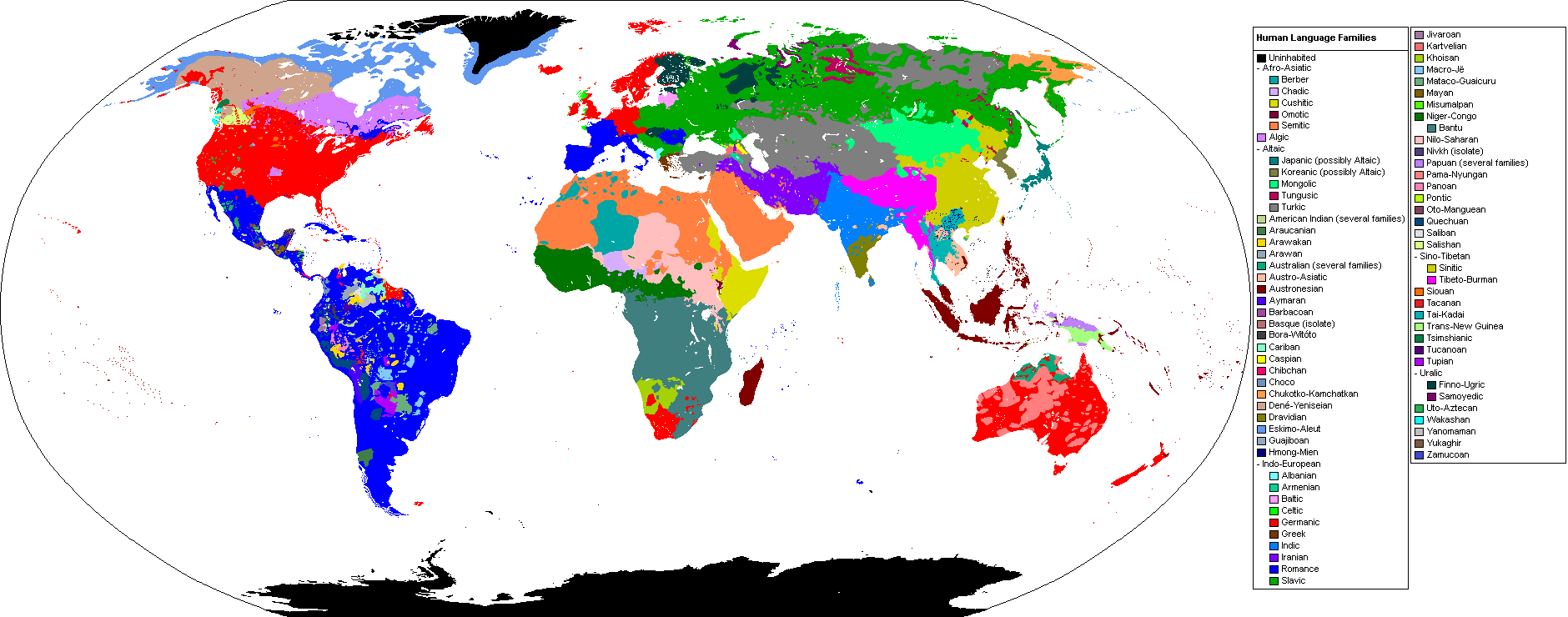
The world's language families.

Linguistic research at LACITO involves fieldwork in various language families, including:

- Oto-Manguean
- Eskaleut
- Finno-Ugric
- Indo-European (Romance,
  Slavic, Indo-Aryan…)
- Caucasian languages (Nakh-Daghestanian, Kartvelian)
- Afroasiatic languages (Semitic, Berber)
- Nilo-Saharan
- Niger–Congo
- Dravidian
- Sino-Tibetan, Tibeto-Burman
- Austroasiatic/Mon-Khmer
- Austronesian, Oceanic.

== Domains of research ==
- Descriptive linguistics
- Language documentation
- Phonology, morphosyntax, semantics
- Linguistic typology
- Historical and comparative linguistics
- Linguistic anthropology
- Oral literature and folklore
