= Kʼin =

Part of the ancient Maya Long Count Calendar system which corresponds to one day

A Kʼin (Mayan pronunciation: [kʼin]) is a part of the ancient Maya Long Count Calendar system which corresponds to one day. It is the smallest unit of Maya time to be counted as part of the long count and it usually appears as the last glyph in a long count date. Such long count dates can be seen on many inscriptions in the Mayan area at the start of the initial series which usually occurs at the beginning of an inscription.

"Kʼin" means "sun" in the Mayan language.
