= Na language =

Sino-Tibetan language spoken in China

Na
- Narua
- Native to: China
- Region: Sichuan
- Ethnicity: Mosuo
- Native speakers: 47,000 (2010)
- Language family: Sino-Tibetan: Lolo-Burmese or Qiangic; Naic; Naish; Na

Language codes
- ISO 639-3: nru
- Glottolog: yong1270

Na (or Narua, Mosuo) is a language of the Naish subbranch of the Naic group of the Sino-Tibetan languages.

== Varieties ==
Yongning Na, which is spoken in Yongning Township, Ninglang County, Lijiang, Yunnan, China, has been documented by Jacques and Michaud (2011). It has three tonal levels. A trilingual dictionary is available online.

Lataddi Narua is notable for having only two tonal levels.

== Phonology ==
=== Consonants ===
		Labial	Alveolar	Retroflex	Alveolo- palatal	Palatal	Velar	Uvular	Glottal
Nasal		m	n	(ɳ)		ɲ	(ŋ)		
Stop	voiceless	p	t	(ʈ)			k	q	(ʔ)
Stop	aspirated	pʰ	tʰ	(ʈʰ)			kʰ	qʰ	
Stop	voiced	b	d	(ɖ)			ɡ	ɢ	
Affricate	voiceless		t͡s	t͡ʂ	t͡ɕ				
Affricate	aspirated		t͡sʰ	t͡ʂʰ	t͡ɕʰ				
Affricate	voiced		d͡z	d͡ʐ	d͡ʑ				
Fricative	voiceless	f	s	ʂ	ɕ		(x)		h
Fricative	voiced	(v)	z	ʐ	ʑ		ɣ	(ʁ)	
Lateral	fricative		ɬ						
Lateral	glide		l	(ɭ)					
Approximant		w				j			

- /t, tʰ, d, n, l/ can be heard as [ʈ, ʈʰ, ɖ, ɳ, ɭ] when preceding vowel sounds /ɯ, u, v̩, ɤ, æ/.
- /p, pʰ, b, m, w/ can be heard as [ʙ̥, ʙ̥ʰ, ʙ, ɱ, v] when preceding vowel sounds /ɯ, u, v̩/.
- /ɣ/ can also be heard as uvular [ʁ] in word-initial position.
- /w, h/ is also heard as voiceless [w̥, x] in free variation.
- /n/ is heard as velar [ŋ] when before velar stops.
- [ʔ] is heard in initial position before vowels.

=== Vowels ===
	Front	Central	Back	
Close	i		ɯ	u
Mid	ɛ	ə	ɤ	ɔ
Open	æ, æ̃		ɑ	
Syllabic			v̩	

- /ɯ/ can be heard as [ɨ] in syllable-initial position and as retroflex [ɻ̩] when after retroflex consonants.

== Grammar ==
=== Syntax ===
Narua's default word order is agent–object–verb, although expression of all verb arguments is not obligatory.

Narua marks sentence topics with jjo /dʑo˥/ after a topicalized clause or noun phrase.
