= Cover symbol =

Letters or symbols representing broad classes of sounds

In linguistics, cover symbols (sometimes informally called wildcards, analogous to wildcard characters in computing) are letters or symbols used to represent broad natural classes of sounds. Such systems are useful for describing sound changes in historical linguistics, phonotactics in phonology, and ambiguous or underspecified identification in phonetics.

== Tables ==
=== Consonants ===
==== Manner of articulation ====
The majority of the symbols below are defined for indeterminate sounds by the Extensions to the International Phonetic Alphabet (extIPA), which recommends the use of a surrounding circle ⟨◯⟩. The symbols represent manners of articulation.

Symbol	Definition
C	Any consonant.
Ȼ	Any obstruent.
Č	Any affricate.
Ƈ	Any implosive.
F	Any fricative.
G	Any glide.
Ʞ	Any click.
L	Any liquid or lateral.
N	Any nasal.
P	Any plosive.
R	Any rhotic.
R	Any resonant or sonorant.
S	Any resonant or sonorant.
S	Any sibilant.

⟨Z⟩ may also be used for any voiced sibilant, in which case ⟨S⟩ is used for any voiceless sibilant.

==== Place of articulation ====
Several symbols are commonly used for sounds of indeterminate manners but specific places of articulation.

Symbol	Definition
B	Any labial.
D	Any dental or alveolar.
H	Any glottal.
Ħ	Any pharyngeal or epiglottal.
J	Any palatal.
K	Any velar.
Q	Any uvular.
W	Any labiovelar.

⟨T⟩ may also be used for any voiceless alveolar, in which case ⟨D⟩ is used for any voiced alveolar.

One may prefer to use iconographic hooks on ⟨C⟩ for certain places.

Symbol	Definition
Ç	Any palatal.
Ꞔ (C̡)	Any palatal.
(C̢)	Any retroflex.

==== Proto-Indo-European studies ====
Those reconstructing Proto-Indo-European phonology use the following cover symbols, some of which differ from the examples above.

Symbol	Definition
G	Any dorsal obstruent.
H	Any laryngeal.
M	Any labial sonorant.
P	Any labial obstruent.
R	Any non-labial sonorant.
T	Any coronal obstruent.

=== Vowels ===
Capitalized vowels are commonly used in discussions of languages with vowel harmony. They often indicate different harmonic variants of an underlying archiphonemic vowel.

Symbol	Description
A	Any open vowel.
E	Any unrounded mid vowel.
I	Any unrounded close vowel.
Ɨ	Any central vowel.
O	Any rounded mid vowel.
U	Any rounded close vowel.
V	Any vowel.
Ṽ	Any nasal vowel.

=== Syllables ===
In phonotactics, cover symbols for syllable structures are often written with Greek letters.

Symbol	Description
σ	A syllable.
μ	A mora.
ω	An onset.
ρ	A rime.
ν	A nucleus.
κ	A coda.

=== Other symbols ===
Symbol	Description
T	Any tone, pitch accent, or stress.
X	Any sound.
