= Larung Gar Buddhist Academy =

In Tibet

Coordinates: 32.1528°N 100.4689°E

Panorama of the Academy in Sêrtar, facing west

Panorama of the Academy in Sêrtar, facing east

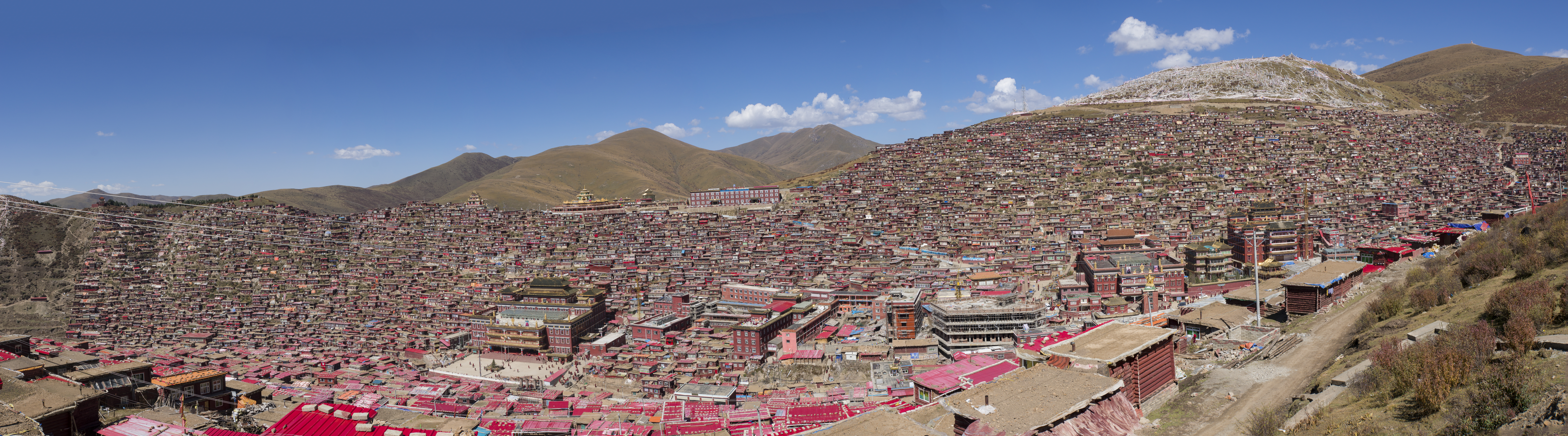
Panorama of the Academy in Sêrtar, facing north

Panorama of the Academy in Sêrtar, facing south

The Larung Gar Buddhist Academy, officially named by the 10th Panchen Lama in 1987 as the Serta Larung Five Science Buddhist Academy (Tibetan: བླ་རུང་ལྔ་རིག་ནང་བསྟན་སློབ་གླིང་།, ZWPY: Serta Larung Ngarig Nangdän Lobling; Chinese: 喇荣五明佛学院; pinyin: Lǎróng Wǔmíng fóxuéyuàn) and also known as the Sertar Buddhist Institute, is a Tibetan Buddhist institute in Larung Gar, a township of Sêrtar County in northern Garzê Tibetan Autonomous Prefecture in northwestern Sichuan Province, China. Part of the Tibetan cultural area of Kham, the institute grew from a mountain retreat established by Kyabje Khenchen Jigme Phuntsok in 1980, intending to provide ecumenical training in Tibetan Buddhism and renew meditation, ethics, and scholarship all over Tibet in the wake of China's Cultural Revolution of 1966-76.

Despite the remote location, an ancient prophecy by the first Dodrupchen Rinpoche named its founder and described its location, and the site is considered sacred. Larung Gar's Academy grew from less than a dozen students gathering around Khenchen Jigme Phuntsok's home, to a community of more than a hundred students living in mud huts by 1981, as reported by International Campaign for Tibet.

According to several Tibetan advocacy organizations, the Academy continued growing as monks, nuns, and lay students relocated and built residences, to become one of the largest and most influential ecumenical centers for the study of Tibetan Buddhism in the world.

By 2001, the Academy grew to number 8,500 monks and nuns, with an additional 1,000 Chinese students, and more lay persons. By 2016, the number of official residents had grown to 10,000, while the unofficial estimated number was between 20,000 to 40,000 people, according to a joint 2017 report by Tibet Watch and Free Tibet.

== Demographics ==
The Academy's principles of teaching and training are: "Unity and Harmony"; "Pure Precepts"; "Listening, Reflecting and Meditating"; and "Spreading the Dharma to Benefit Sentient Beings".

The student body of Larung Gar Five Science Buddhist Academy is composed of monks, nuns, lay "vow-holders" and tantric practitioners, of mostly Tibetan and Chinese origins, while Mongolians and students from other Asian countries also figure prominently.

Students are associated with one of the four institutions at the Academy: the Ngarig Nangten Lobling monastery, the Pema Khandro Duling Nunnery, the Lektso Charbeb Ling center, and the International Religious Committee.

Ngarig Nangten Lobling is the monastery for monks, while approximately 4,000 monks were in residence in 2001. It offers a Khenpo degree, and hundreds of khenpos have graduated from Larung Gar's Academy since 1980.

Pema Khandro Duling Nunnery is the nuns center, while approximately 4,500 nuns were in residence in 2001, coming from all regions of Tibet. The majority of residents at the Academy are women, and the curriculum allows nuns to achieve a coveted Khenmo degree for the first time in Tibetan history. Entry into the relatively small number of nunneries that exist in other areas of Tibet has been limited, but the Academy is open to virtually anyone who genuinely seeks to become a student of Khenpo Jigme Phuntsok's ecumenical vision. Khenpo's niece, Jetsunma Muntso, was recognized by the 14th Dalai Lama as a tulku, and heads the nunnery.

Lektso Charbeb Ling is the lay practitioner center, and has trained over 1,000 lay "vow-holders" and tantric practitioners from Sêrtar and other regions of Tibet and China.

The International Religious Committee oversees 1,000 students from regions of the People's Republic of China and students from other Asian countries. Roughly ten percent of the nearly 10,000 students attending the Academy are ethnic Han people. They attend separate classes taught in Standard Chinese while larger classes are taught in Amdo Tibetan.

The teaching halls are located in the center of the valley, together with a golden statue of the Garuda.

== History ==
A mountain hermitage was previously established near the location in 1880 by Dudjom Lingpa, and earlier incarnation of Dudjom Rinpoche. Yogis resided there, such as Khenchen Jigme Phuntsok's previous incarnation Terton Lerab Lingpa's student Chatrel Choying Rangdrul, and great realizations were gained in the sacred area.

After escaping the Cultural Revolution to reside in the near area with a group of loyal monks, Khenchen Jigme Phuntsok officially took over the mountain hermitage in the summer of 1980 and founded Larung Gar, based on the tradition of Buddhist encampments (chos sgar).

Larung Gar's Academy opened and operated privately and independently, with a standing executive committee of seven learned khenpos or lamas, but major decisions were confirmed and implemented only after consultation with Khenchen Jigme Phuntsok.

In 1987, the 10th Panchen Lama bestowed the name of Sertar Larung Ngarig Nangten Lobling with the ambition to create a "spiritual oasis" and the largest center for Tibetan Buddhist studies.

As Antonio Terrone writes, Khenchen Jigme Phuntsok's "dedication to rigorous monastic learning, the Vinaya code of conduct, and a commitment to an ecumenical system of teaching" welcomed students "from all traditions of Tibetan Buddhism."

The Academy has graduated more than 500 khenpos and khenmos — male and female holders of Doctoral degrees in Buddhism — and is widely renowned for the high quality of both its spiritual and secular education. English, Chinese, and Tibetan languages and modern computer studies have been taught alongside a traditional non-sectarian Buddhist curriculum.

The khenpos and khenmos then are authorized to establish Buddhist centers and monasteries, which further propagates Tibetan Buddhism and intertwines with Tibetan culture. As Terrone also writes, "Larung Gar is a landmark of his commitment to disseminate Buddhism in an ecumenical fashion, to strengthen monasticism and Buddhist ethics, and to heighten religious education and Tibetan traditional culture."

== Demolitions and forced evictions ==
As Larung Gar grew, more than 1,000 new homes were constructed every year by both professional crews and by monks and nuns themselves with the help of their families and friends. In the mid-1980's, the resident population of monks and nuns numbered 6,000. And by 1998, 4,500 nuns, 4,000 monks, and nearly 1,000 Chinese students together lived, studied, and meditated at Larung Gar, according to the report from International Campaign for Tibet.

Widely reported and internationally condemned mass demolitions of residences and forced evictions of monks, nuns, and international students impacted the Serta Larung Five Science Buddhist Academy and the community of Larung Gar. Monks and nuns were subject to political re-education programs beginning in April 2000.

The demolitions of monastic residences began in 2001, after pressure was applied from Sertar authorities to Khenchen Jigme Phuntsok and others to denounce the Tibetan spiritual leader, the 14th Dalai Lama. Approximately 8,000 students and residents were evicted as 4,000 buildings were demolished. Afterwards, additional demolitions and forced evictions of monks and nuns also occurred in 2002, and in 2013 when monks and nuns were evicted and some were arrested and sentenced to prison from one to six years, according to a joint Tibet Watch and Free Tibet report. In 2015, another 1,000 people were forcibly evicted including elderly nuns and monks.

Mass demolitions recommenced in July 2016 and continued to 2018, to which the European Parliament responded with condemnation in December 2016. The demolition order set a limit to the population of monks and nuns at 5,000 - 3,500 nuns and 1,500 monks - and specified the demolitions of "old age homes and nuns' hostels". A count of 3,729 people had been evicted by December 2016, and the vast majority of demolitions were of nuns' residences.

Additionally, at least 4,820 monks and nuns were forcibly evicted during 2017-2018. Reports beginning in July 2016 state monks and nuns were bussed to either political re-education centers, or to political re-education camps, or to their home towns and to local political re-education efforts through their prefectures.

As at Yarchen Gar, whose demolitions and forced evictions are similar to those at Larung Gar, evicted nuns and monks are not permitted to re-enroll at their home monasteries, or to relocate.

The demolitions also impacted the open organization of the original encampment, and its atmosphere of quiet spiritual contemplation and study. Some of the demolitions in Larung Gar widened footpaths into roadways, which introduced vehicles into semi-private areas previously closed to traffic, as described by a joint Tibet Watch and Free Tibet report. The mix of students in residential areas was changed to separate the students into areas designated for nuns, for monks and for lay students surrounded by walls. The report also indicates other demolitions were undertaken adjacent to the main Gompa, where a hotel was being constructed by 2017.

Reports do not indicate that the Academy's buildings were subject to physical demolitions, which include the monastery, the nunnery, the lay practitioner's center, and the foreign student center.

But in August 2017, it was announced that a Chinese Communist Party (CCP) committee of six was taking over control of Larung Gar's Academy, a move observers said was for greater control and surveillance. The deputy police chief of Garze would be appointed as the Institute's CCP secretary and as its director, a move which would remove Khenchen Jigme Phuntsok's niece, recognized tulku Ani Mumsto from the position.

Tibetan author Tsering Woeser stated, "Sending party secretaries to run a Tibetan Buddhist institute is just ridiculous," and, "The party does not regard Larung Gar as a Buddhist academy, but attempts to manage it as a unit of the state or party apparatus."

In July 2026, Chinese authorities started demolishing homes at the Larung Five Sciences Buddhist Academy in Serthar County, Sichuan. The demolitions were carried out at night, and by 15 July, six residences had been torn down. Reports said that more than 1,060 additional homes used by monks and nuns had also been marked for removal.

== Horxi Samyang Lonpê Buddhist Institute ==
The Larung Horxi Samyang Lonpê Buddhist Institute (Tibetan: བླ་རུང་ཧོར་ཤིལ་འཇམ་དབྱངས་བློ་འཕེལ་ནང་བསྟན་སློབ་གླིང་།, ZWPY: Larung Horxi Jamyang Lonpê nangdän lobling, Chinese: 喇榮霍西文殊增慧佛學院; pinyin: Larong Huoxi wenshu zenghui foxueyuan) is a Buddhist institute 20 kilometers from the Serta Larung Five Science Buddhist Academy at Larung Gar, 40 kilometers from the central town of Sêrtar County. While not located in the Larung Valley, it was named by Cüchim Lozhö (ཚུལ་ཁྲིམས་བློ་གྲོས།), Känbo of the Ngarig Buddhist Academy.

== Tourism and media ==
Larung Gar and the Larung Valley are outside the main tourist routes and few foreigners find their way there. Larung Gar has been closed to foreign visitors since June 2016. There is one hotel on the Northern ridgeline, which is most easily reached via the new construction access road from the north, avoiding the congestion on the narrow streets of the institute. There are also a simple guesthouse and a few restaurants on the main square next to the main Gompa. A new "Temple of Death" has been built at the sky burial site about one kilometer north of the institute.

In February 2016, a photograph of Larung Gar by Hungarian photographer Attila Balogh was shortlisted for that year's Sony World Photography Awards.

== See also ==
- Yarchen Gar
