= Jigme Phuntsok =

Tibetan lama (1933–2004)

Chinese name
- Simplified Chinese: 晋美彭措
- Traditional Chinese: 晉美彭措
Transcriptions
Standard Mandarin
- Hanyu Pinyin: Jìnměi Péngcuò
- Wade–Giles: Chin^{4}-mei^{3} P'eng^{2}ts'o^{4}

Tibetan name
- Tibetan: འཇིགས་མེད་ཕུན་ཚོགས་
Transcriptions
- Wylie: 'Jigs-med Phun-tshogs

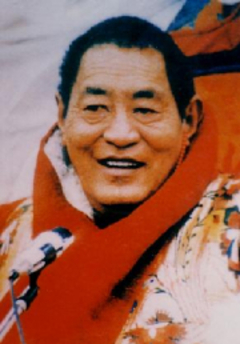
Kyabje Khenchen Jigme Phuntsok

Kyabje Khenchen Jigme Phuntsok (Tibetan: འཇིགས་མེད་ཕུན་ཚོགས་འབྱུང་གནས།, Wylie transliteration: 'jigs med phun tshogs 'byung gnas) (1933 – 7 January 2004) was a Nyingma lama and Terton from Sertha Region. His family were Tibetan nomads. At the age of five he was recognized "as a reincarnation of Lerab Lingpa (las rab gling pa, 1856-1926). Known also as Nyala Sogyel (nyag bla bsod rgyal) and Terton Sogyel (gter ston bsod rgyal), Lerab Lingpa was an eclectic and highly influential tantric visionary from the eastern Tibetan area of Nyarong (nyag rong)." He studied Dzogchen at Nubzor Monastery, received novice ordination at 14, and full ordination at 22 (or 1955). In 1980, he founded Larung Gar, the largest Tibetan Buddhist monastic academy.

Jigme Phuntsok was the most influential lama of the Nyingma school of Tibetan Buddhism in contemporary Tibet (according to Khenpo Samdup who was his disciple). A Tibetan Buddhist meditation master and renowned teacher of Great Perfection (Dzogchen), he established the Sertha Buddhist Institute in 1980, known locally as Larung Gar, a non-sectarian study center with approximately 10,000 monks, nuns, and lay students at its highest count. He played an important role in revitalizing the teaching of Tibetan Buddhism following the liberalization of religious practice in 1980.

Jigme Phuntsok was also an extraordinary Terton (Buddhist treasure revealer), uncovering many treasures texts in Tibet, as well as other parts of China, and India. In the 1990s, he began an appeal to traditional Tibetan yak herders to refrain from commercial sale of their livestock for spiritual and cultural reasons that has grown into the Anti-Slaughter Movement.

== Biography ==
Khenchen Jigme Phuntsok was born in 1933, the third day of the first month of the year of the Water Bird, in Golog Serthar Amdo region of Tibet, or the rugged washul Sertar region of the Tibetan cultural region of Amdo, a vast expanse of high-plateau grasslands. He adopted Manjusri as his personal deity and he is said to have had visions of him several times, including once in 1987 when he visited Mount Wutai, the holy mountain abode of Majushri in China.

At the age of five, Khenpo was recognized as the reincarnate of Tertön Sogyal, guru to the 13th Dalai Lama Thubten Gyatsho, and became a monk at Nubzur Gonpa, a branch of the Palyul monastery in Sertar. He became increasingly interested in Dzogchen, received formal religious training under Thubga Rinpoche at Changma Rithro in Dzachukha, and was selected to become the Khenpo, or abbot, of Nubzur Monastery at the age of twenty-four.

From the rise of the People's Republic of China, Khenpo's spiritual path was greatly changed, to the point in 1959 he withdrew with a group of faithful monks into the remote Sertar mountains, and herded a small flock of goats and sheep. There he engaged in meditation and gave teachings to small numbers of people and was able to continue his spiritual practice, while apparently untouched by the violence and destruction of the Cultural Revolution. By its end in 1976, Khenpo Jigme Phuntsok's fame had grown exponentially. His teachings and his images circulated around the Tibetan plateau.

In 1980, the 10th Panchen Lama visited Khenchen Jigme Phuntsok at his mountain retreat which evolved into the independent and private Sertar Buddhist Institute. In 1987, Khenpo led hundreds of his students from Serthar Institute on a pilgrimage to the sacred mountains of Mount Wutai in China's Shanxi Province. En route in Beijing, he met again with the 10th Panchen Lama as he gave teachings on the 37 Practices of Bodhisattvas. During the meeting, the Panchen Lama blessed and officially endorsed Larung Gar and bestowed its name as Serta Larung Ngarik Nangten Lobling (gser rta bla rung lnga rig nang bstan blob gling), or Serta Larung Five Science Buddhist Academy.

Khenpo's teachings during the pilgrimage helped open Tibetan Buddhism to students from beyond the plateau, after a gathering of over 5,000 people attended, including Tibetans, Chinese, Mongols, and other Buddhist practitioners. At Mount Wutai, the gatherings for Khenchen Jigme Phuntsok's teachings swelled to 10,000 on occasions. He also undertook retreats at sacred locations and in caves, and authorized the prolific treasure revealers Khandro Tāre Lama and Namtrul Jigme Puntsok.

Khenpo made extensive travels across Tibet with the Panchen Lama, and to the rest of China teaching the Nyingma school's lineage and discovering hidden treasures. In 1990, after the invitations by the 14th Dalai Lama and Penor Rinpoche, he visited Nepal and India, where he taught at various monasteries, including the Nyingma Institute in Mysore. At Dharamsala, the 14th Dalai Lama gave and received empowerments and teachings with Khenpo for two weeks in a continuation of the 13th Dalai Lama's and Terton Lerab Lingpa's relationship. The same year, the Queen of Bhutan with Dilgo Khyentse invited Khenchen Jigme Phuntsok to visit, and teachings were given to the king.

In 1993, Khenpo was invited by Buddhist Dharma centers to tour and teach in Europe and North America. There, he became disillusioned with the commercialization of Buddhist teachings in the West. Khenchen Jigme Phuntsok expanded his following during teaching tours in the United States, Canada, Germany, England, France, and during teaching tours in Asia at Japan, Taiwan, Hong Kong, India, Nepal, and Bhutan. Financial offerings made to him during this tour funded a major building program at the institute.

Chinese authorities repeatedly harassed Larung Gar. In 1999 and in 2001, Chinese authorities searched the premises, and began a "patriotic re-education" of resident monks and nuns in April 2000.

On 18 April 2001, Chinese authorities issued a demolition order and a reduction of students order for Larung Gar as reported in detail by the Tibetan Center for Human Rights and Democracy (TCHRD). Afterward, around 8,000 students were expelled and 3,800 residences and meditation huts were demolished. A joint 2017 Tibet Watch and Free Tibet report on Larung Gar states Khenchen Jigme Phuntsok refused to expel students before the demolitions began, and was held incommunicado for a year at a military hospital in Chengdu, Barkham County, as a result. The TCHRD also states his personal physician Rigzin was barred from the hospital. Several sources report his health declined at the same time, but he returned to Larung Gar and continued teaching in 2002–2003. The International Campaign for Tibet reports the Serthar Public Security Bureau occupied monastic buildings at the institute, and Chinese authorities kept Khenchen Jigme Phuntsok under constant surveillance. In late November 2003, his younger sister Ani Mundron died at Larung Gar.

After becoming ill during a teaching on 3 December 2003, he was taken to the Barkham hospital, then was scheduled for heart surgery in Chengdu at 10:00 am local time on 29 December 2003. A then-student and Chinese translator, Khenpo Sodargye, states a heart operation had occurred. But after being admitted to Military Hospital 363 in Chengdu, Khenchen Jigme Phuntsok died there on the evening of 6 January 2004, at the age of 72. Sources state the actual cause of his death remains a mystery.

The last teaching given by Khenchen Jigme Phuntsok was delivered from the Chengdu hospital during a telephone call to his students at Larung Gar: "Do not lose your own path; do not disturb others' minds."

== Serta Larung Five Science Buddhist Academy ==
Panorama of the academy in Sêrtar, facing north

Panorama of the academy in Sêrtar, facing south

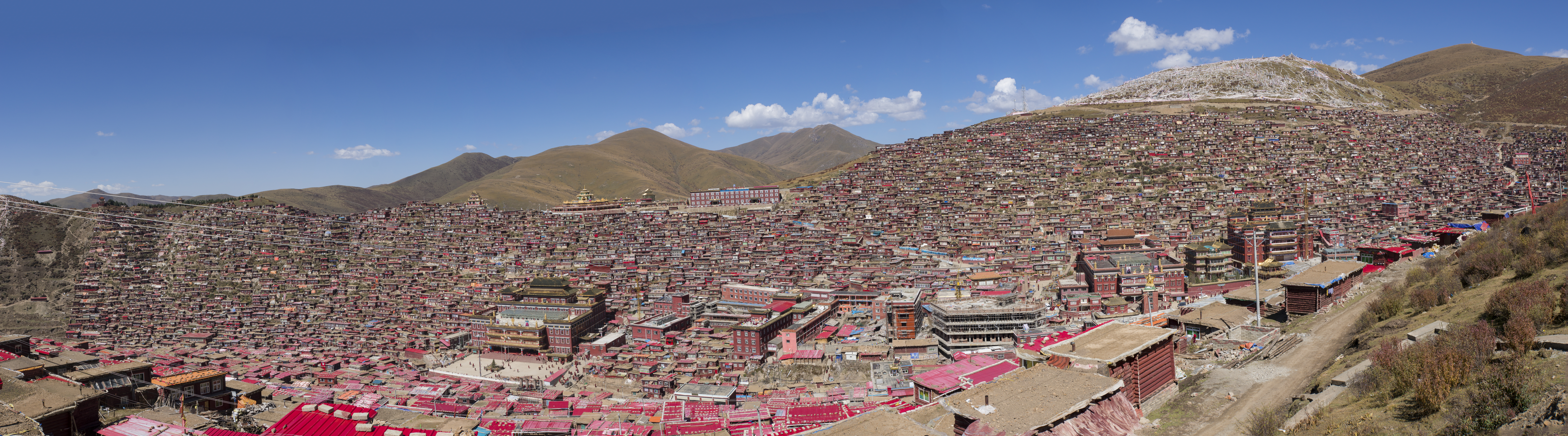
Panorama of the academy in Sêrtar, facing east

Panorama of the academy in Sêrtar, facing west

In 1980, Jigme Phuntsok founded Larung Gar, known as Larung Gar Buddhist Academy and by its official name as bestowed by the 10th Panchen Lama, Serta Larung Ngarik Nangten Lobling (gser rta bla rung lnga rig nang bstan blob gling) or Serta Larung Five Science Buddhist Academy.

Comprising several monastic and lay practitioner institutions, it is located in the Larung Valley near the town of Sêrtar, Garzê Prefecture, Sichuan Province. The purpose of the academy has been to provide an ecumenical training in Tibetan Buddhism and to meet the need for renewal of meditation and scholarship all over Tibet in the wake of China's Cultural Revolution of 1966–76.

Despite its remote location, it grew from a handful of disciples gathering in Khenpo's home to be one of the largest and most influential centers for the study of Tibetan Buddhism in the world, numbering more than 10,000 monks, nuns, and lay disciples by the year 2000.

Overall, the student body of the academy was made up of monks, nuns, lay "vow-holders" of both Tibetan and Chinese origins, and tantric practitioners. They studied under four major religious divisions in the Institute: Ngarig Nangten Lobling, Pema Khandro Duling Nunnery, Lektso Charbeb Ling, and the International Religious Committee.

Ngarig Nangten Lobling consisted of 2,500 Tibetan monks.

Pema Khandro Duling Nunnery is the home for study to approximately 5,000 nuns, as of late 1990s, from all regions of Tibet. More than half of those who came to Serthar are women and the curriculum allowed nuns to achieve a coveted Khenpo degree, or Khenmo for women, for the first time in Tibetan history. Entry into the relatively small number of nunneries that exist in other areas of Tibet is limited, but Serthar was open to virtually anyone who genuinely sought to become a student of Jigme Phuntsok's ecumenical vision. Khenpo's niece, Jetsunma Mume Yeshe Tsomo, is recognized as the tulku of Khandro Mingyur Pelkyi Dronma (mkha' 'gro mi 'gyur dpal gyi sgron ma, d.u.), and heads the order of nuns. Also known as Ani Mumsto, in 2017 she was a director of the Sertar Institute.

Lektso Charbeb Ling is the section that trained over 1,000 lay Tibetan "vow-holders" and tantric practitioners from Sêrtar and other regions of Tibet.

The International Religious Committee oversaw 1,000 disciples from regions of the People's Republic of China and students from other Asian countries. Roughly ten percent of the nearly 10,000 students attending the academy were ethnic Han people. Tibetologist Glenn Mullin said, "It is interesting to see how strong Tibetan Buddhism has become throughout China these days. There are small study and practice centers almost everywhere in the country. Some have become explosively huge, like Khenpo Jigmey Puntsok’s place in Kham, which always has well over 10,000 full time students and trainees in residence." They attended separate classes taught in Standard Chinese while larger classes were taught in Standard Tibetan.

Sertha Larung Five Science Buddhist Academy has operated with a standing executive committee of seven learned lamas, but major decisions were confirmed and implemented only after consultation with Jigme Phuntsok.

The academy has been home to over 500 khenpos—holders of bachelor's degrees in divinity—and widely renowned by some for the high quality of both its religious and secular education. English, Chinese, and Tibetan languages and modern computer studies have been taught alongside traditional non-sectarian Buddhist curriculum.

== Terma ==
"Terma" is a Tibetan term that means "treasures" and refers to Buddhist texts, ritual objects such as statues, or chests that may have been concealed by Padmasambhava or other Buddhist masters. Uncovering terma is a very important tradition of the Nyingma school of Tibetan Buddhism.

In modern Tibet, Jigme Phuntsok was an intellectual and religious scholar as well as a famous Tertön (treasure revealer). There are many mythic and charismatic stories of his ability to uncover Terma. In 1990, he discovered a sacred site that had been a palace of legendary King Gesar. That led to an archaeological dig that turned up ancient building stones and several treasure chests. His findings of new sacred sites and caves that related to previous Buddhas and reincarnations are numerous in Tibet. He also found holy places in other parts of world. During his visit to Mount Wutai in China and India, by miraculous signs he recalled memories of previous lives and discovered meditation retreat sites that were previously unknown.

Jigme Phuntsok's ability to uncover Terma has played an important role in inspiring devotion in the revival of Tibetan Buddhism in contemporary Tibet. He is particularly known in the West for "A Branch of the Kilaya Tantra Gurkhukma called: The Sole Kilaya of the Sacred Bond of the Heart."

== Anti-slaughter movement ==
Jigme Phuntsok first started the Anti-Slaughter Movement in the 1990s, after seeing an increase in the slaughter rate of livestock from Tibetan households and in the way that livestock suffered in transportation to domestic Chinese markets. As a religious teacher, he requested traditional herders to reduce their sale of livestock to commercial markets or to stop altogether. His students and many other lamas made similar appeals to herders to refrain from selling their livestock for commercial slaughter. Large numbers of herders responded by taking an oath to stop for a period of three years (or forever). Today, the practice of herders vowing to refrain from commercial activity with their yak herds has built into a movement that began in Sertha and spread to the larger geographical areas of the Eastern Tibetan Plateau and into the ethnic Tibetan pastoral areas of Sichuan, Qinghai, Gansu, and Tibet Autonomous Region (TAR).

== Relations with the government ==
During the 1959 Tibetan Rebellion he made the crucial decision to remain in Tibet rather than flee to India. Between 1960 and 1980 he returned to a nomadic lifestyle in order to avoid the Cultural Revolution.

In 1980 Jigme Phuntsok founded the Serthar Buddhist Institute (also called the Larung Gar Buddhist Institute, near the town of Sêrtar (Chinese Seda). The institute's popularity grew until there were 8500 students at the site, including about 1000 ethnic Chinese as well as students from Taiwan, Hong Kong, Singapore, and Malaysia.

In 1987 Jigme Phuntsok met and befriended the 10th Panchen Lama. In 1989 he also met the 14th Dalai Lama, whom he refused to denounce, much to the chagrin of the Chinese Communist Party. After this the Chinese government refused him permission to travel for any reason for a period of time.

Khenpo made extensive travels across Tibet and China, teaching and revealing terma. In 1990, at the invitation of Kyabjé Penor Rinpoche, he visited India, where he taught at various monasteries, including the Nyingma Institute in Mysore. At Dharamsala, the Dalai Lama resumed the connections he and Khenpo had in their previous lives by receiving teachings from Khenpo for two weeks. In the summer of 1993, he visited various Dharma centres in India, Bhutan, Hong Kong, Singapore, Malaysia, Taiwan, USA, Canada, and France, including Lerab Ling, where he gave empowerments and teachings including the empowerments of Tertön Sogyal's termas, Tendrel Nyesel and Vajrakilaya, as well as his own terma treasures of Manjushri and Vajrakilaya, and Dzogchen teachings.

Around 1999 the Sichuan United Work Front pressed him on the issue of his support for the Dalai Lama, and demanded that he reduce the number of students at the institute (either to 150 or to 1400, depending on reports). Jigme Phuntsok refused.

In summer of 2001 several thousand members of the People's Armed Police and the Public Security Bureau descended on the site, razing its structures and dispersed its students. He was detained by the government and held incommunicado for a year, then released in poor health while reportedly under constant surveillance. In December 2003, Khenchen Jigme Phuntsok became ill during a teaching, was admitted to a hospital in Barkham and then moved to another hospital in Chengdu. The actual cause of his death at the military hospital in Chengdu is reported to remain a mystery.

== Publications ==
- Khenchen Jigme Phuntsok. A Branch of the Kilaya Tantra Gurkhukma called: The Sole Kilaya of the Sacred Bond of the Heart. Yeshe Melong, Nepal, 1990
- Khenchen Jigme Phuntsok. Placing Buddhahood Within Reach. Chagdud Gonpa/Padma Publishing, 1993
- Khenchen Jigme Phuntsok. The Lamp Which Illuminates Religious and Secular Ethics (lugs gnyis blang dor gsal ba'i sgron me).
- Khenchen Jigme Phuntsok. Melodious Cloud of Heart Advice (snying gdam sprin gyi rol mo).
- Khenchen Jigme Phuntsok Series. Lotsawa House. Translations of Tibetan Masters. Works by and about the influential Nyingma teacher and treasure-revealer Kyabje Khenchen Jigme Phuntsok Rinpoche (mkhan chen 'jigs med phun tshogs), aka Khenpo Jigphun., https://www.lotsawahouse.org/tibetan-masters/khenpo-jigme-phuntsok/
- Khenchen Jigme Phuntsok. Always Present: The Luminous Wisdom of Jigme Phuntsok. Edited by Khenpo Sodargye. Snow Lion, 25 April 2015
- Khenchen Jigme Phuntsok. Always Remembering: Heartfelt Advice for Your Entire Life. Translated by Khenpo Sodargye, Wisdom Publications, 2019.
- Khenchen Jigme Phuntsok. Life and Spirituality: 365 Lessons by His Holiness Jigme Phuntsok Rinpoche. Edited by Khenpo Sodargye, 31 May 2020.
