= Xuri =

Xuri (Chinese: 旭日) may refer to these places in China:

- Xuri Subdistrict, a subdistrict of Shangrao County, Jiangxi
- Xuri Township, a township in Sêrtar County, Sichuan
