= January 2012 Tibetan protests in Sichuan =

Mass Protest

The January 2012 Tibetan protests in Sichuan province might have started with demands for religious freedom, or with a refusal to observe Chinese New Year. At least two and perhaps as many as five Tibetans were killed by gunfire in Seda County and at least two in Luhuo County, both in Sichuan province.

According to a Tibetan monk in India, thousands of Tibetans had participated in the protest and destroyed “Chinese shops and other Chinese facilities in the area.”

== See also ==
- Tibetan independence movement
