= Larung Gar =

Town in Sertar county, Garzê, Sichuan, China

Coordinates: 32.1356°N 100.4565°E

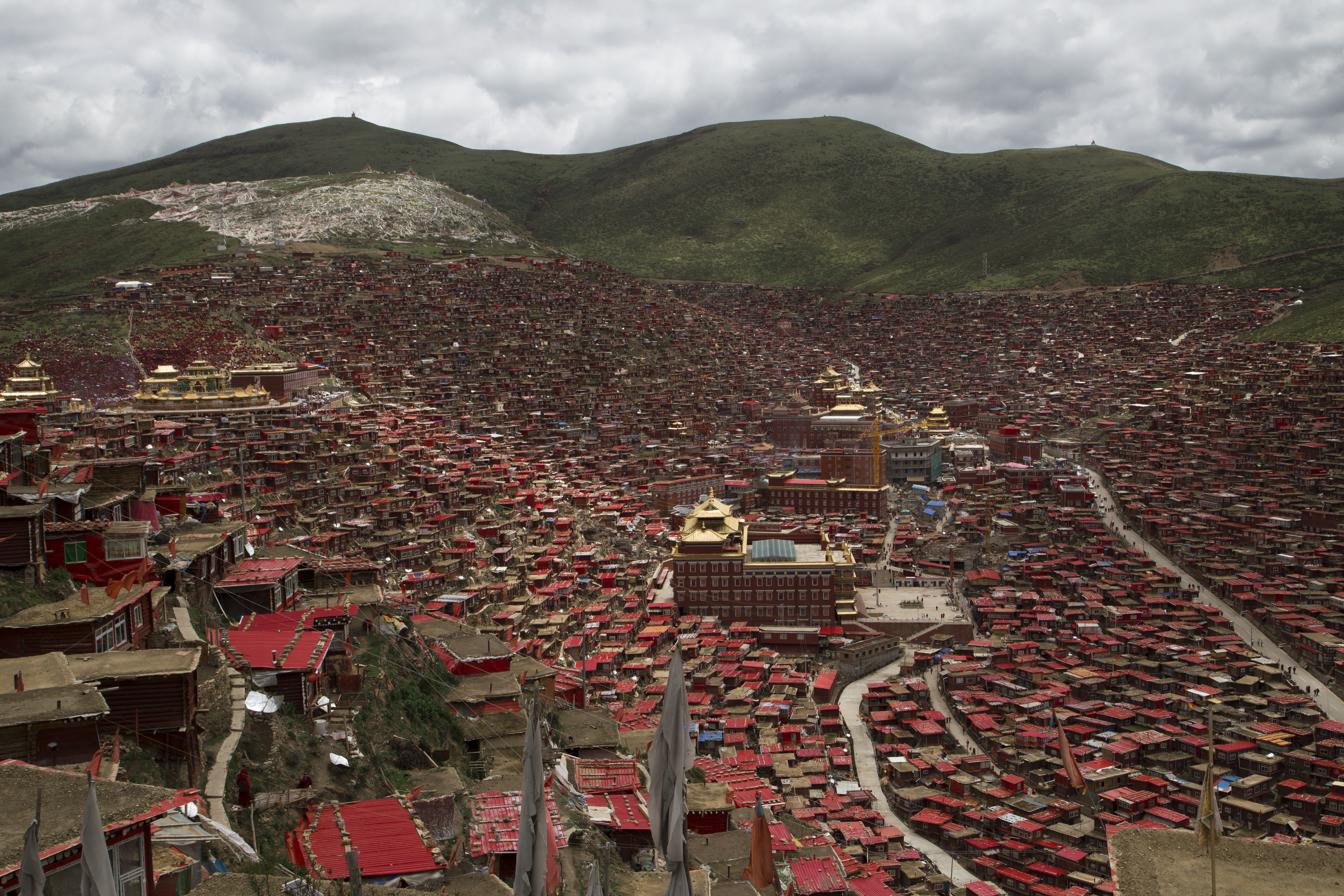
View of Larung Gar monastic center

Larung Gar (Tibetan: བླ་རུང་སྒར་, Wylie: bla rung sgar), also known by its Chinese name as Luoruo township (洛若乡, Luòruò xiāng) in the Larung Valley is a community in Sêrtar County of Garzê Tibetan Autonomous Prefecture, in Sichuan, China. It is part of the Tibetan cultural region known as Amdo. Larung Gar is the local name for the community of mostly Tibetan and Han Chinese students which grew around the Serta Larung Five Science Buddhist Academy, founded in 1980 by Kyabje Khenchen Jigme Phuntsok. The residents are monks, nuns, vow holders and lay people. Larung Gar was considered the largest Buddhist monastic center until demolitions by the Chinese government recommenced in July 2016.

Larung Gar began with less than a dozen students building their residences near Khenchen Jigme Phuntsok's retreat residence, then grew as more Tibetan Buddhist monastic and lay students from the Tibetan plateau arrived. As the Serta Larung Five Science Buddhist Academy grew in reputation and size, more Chinese and international students arrived and built residences to receive teachings from Nyingma Terton Khenchen Jigme Phuntsok. The site is considered sacred and the academy fulfilled an ancient prophecy by the first Dodrupchen Rinpoche.

The community is composed of residences and retreat meditation huts, built with mud bricks or with wood. As the community grew, nuns built guest houses, and foot paths connected the neighborhoods to the academy. A few restaurants are located near the main square adjacent to the Gompa.

By 1999, reports state Chinese authorities began harassing Larung Gar. An earlier round of demolitions commenced in June 2001, after Khenchen Jigme Phuntsok refused orders to reduce the number of students, a decision for which he was detained incommunicado for a year according to several sources and to the 2017 joint report by Tibet Watch and Free Tibet.

Monks and nuns continued to move to Larung Gar to study, and the international population from Tibet, China, Mongolia, and from other Asian countries was said to officially be 10,000 people. By June 2016, Chinese authorities ordered a cut in the number residents by half to 5000, with no more than 3,500 nuns and 1,500 monks, as the huge influx of people living in DIY housing was becoming a safety and fire hazard.

The director of Free Tibet stated, "The demolition at Larung Gar is clearly nothing to do with overcrowding – it is just another tactic in China's attempt to subvert the influence of Buddhism in Tibet."

Condemnation of China's demolitions at Larung Gar has been made by the European Parliament in 2016, and by United Nations human rights experts in 2017. By 2018, concern with the ongoing destruction of Larung Gar and Yarchen Gar was expressed by the United States Department of State. In October 2020, a joint statement by 39 countries was read at the United Nations general assembly on human rights, which compares human rights abuses in Tibet to those in Xinjiang.

== Serta Larung Five Science Buddhist Academy ==
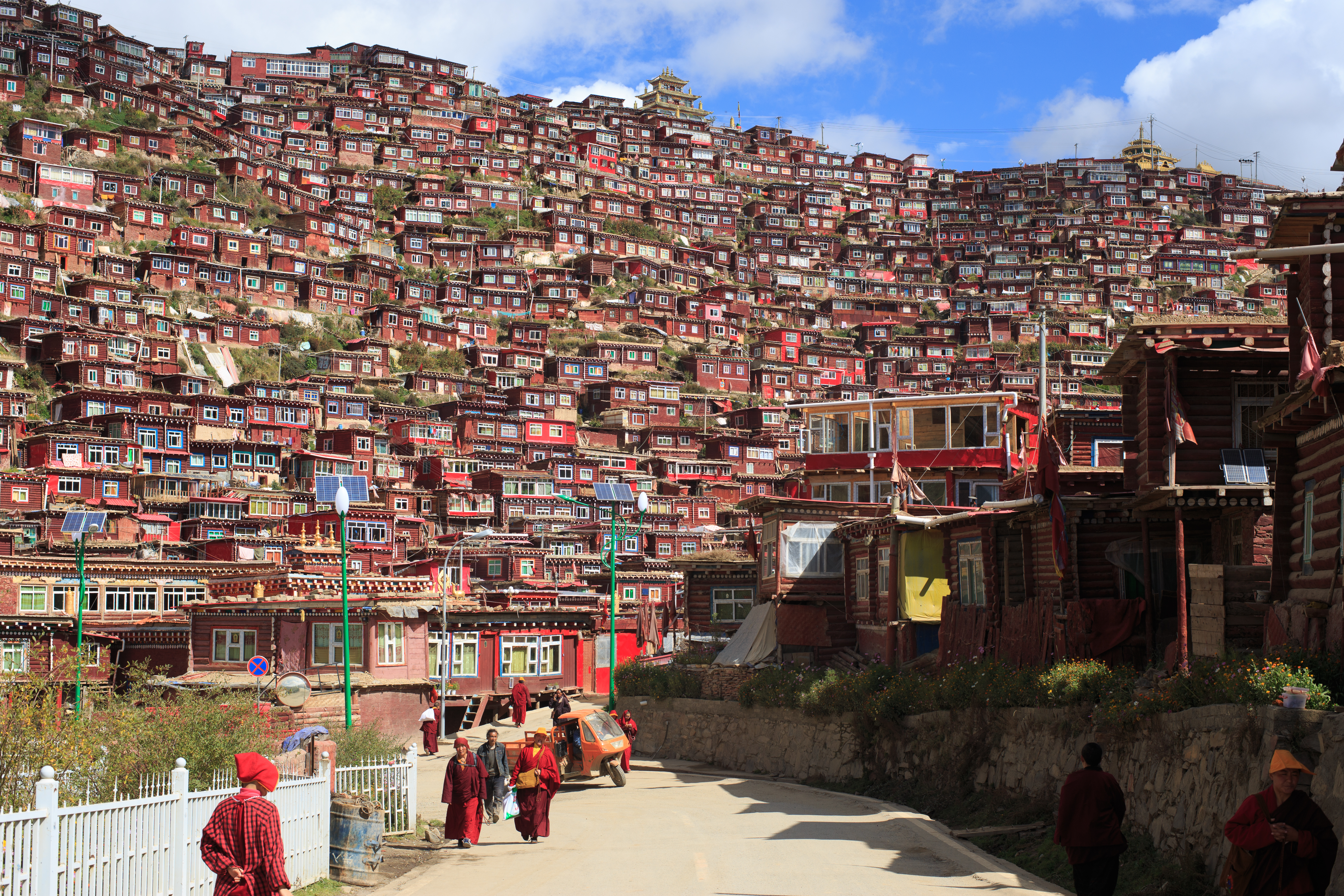
The houses of the town on the hillside

The Sertar Buddhist Institute is also a common name used for the monastic institute at Larung Gar, formally named the Serta Larung Five Science Buddhist Academy.

It was officially founded in 1980 in the uninhabited valley by Nyingma lama Khyabje Khenchen Jigme Phuntsok, while it evolved from his mountain retreat previously established there during the Cultural Revolution. That mountain retreat is also said to have connections to a mountain hermitage built in 1880 by Dudjom Dorje.

The community grew around Larung Gar's Academy, where monks, nuns, and vow-holding lay people of both Tibetan and Chinese origins study under one of four major spiritual institutions at the academy:

- Ngarig Nangten Lobling – a monastery for approximately 4,000 monks
- Pema Khandro Duling Nunnery – a nunnery for approximately 5,000 nuns
- Lektso Charbeb Ling – a spiritual center for approximately 1,000 lay vow-holding practitioners
- International Religious Committee – a spiritual center for international students

== Demolitions and forced evictions ==
As Larung Gar grew, more than 1,000 new homes were constructed every year by both professional crews and by monks and nuns themselves with the help of their families and friends. By 1986, the resident population of monks and nuns numbered 6,000. And by 1998, 4,500 nuns, 4,000 monks, and nearly 1,000 Chinese students together lived, studied, and meditated at Larung Gar, according to the report from International Campaign for Tibet.

Chinese authorities repeatedly harassed Larung Gar. In 1999 and in 2001, Chinese authorities searched the premises, and began a "patriotic re-education" of resident monks and nuns in April 2000.

Also in 2001, mass demolitions and forced evictions of monks, nuns and lay people began after Sichuan authorities wanted signed documents denouncing the Dalai Lama, actions during which Khenchen Jigme Phuntsok was detained for a year. An early report states the Sichuan Religious Affairs Bureau, of the Chinese government, confirmed to Reuters that students were being required to leave the academy, "because of concerns about social stability and at the order of central authorities." Simultaneously, a limit on the monastic population was set at 1,400 residents.

As demolitions continued past June, approximately 4,000 buildings were reported as demolished and 8,000 residents were expelled in 2001, before Chinese authorities returned in 2002 and demolished more buildings, according to the joint 2017 report by Tibet Watch and Free Tibet. An eyewitness visiting Larung Gar at the time stated,

Apparently the officials were torturing nuns and monks that were resisting being expelled. While we were getting this news a group of nuns came walking thru town. One nun was being carried because she could not walk. She had been tortured also. We left shortly afterward.

Additional demolitions by Chinese authorities continued in 2002 after Khenchen Jigme Phuntsok was released from detainment at a military hospital in Barkham County, and just before his death. More demolitions occurred in 2013, and in 2015, according to a 2017 Tibet Watch report. Between the demolition orders and on January 9, 2014, a vast blaze destroyed around 100 wood houses in Larung Gar, according to the Buddhist Channel, while a state-run media outlet said 10 buildings were destroyed.

In June 2016, a mass demolition and forced eviction order at Larung Gar was announced by Chinese authorities, an order to cut the number of Larung Gar residents by half to 5,000, and to offer a reward to ethnic dwellers if they move.

On July 22, 2016, the BBC reported evidence from the campaign group Free Tibet that a government work team, accompanied by Chinese police and plainclothes members of the armed forces, had begun to demolish more buildings at Larung Gar in response to an order made the previous month by local authorities. Their objective was the demolition of 1,500 dwellings and the forced eviction of 4,600 residents.

The mass demolition drive by the People's Republic of China was a huge violation of human rights of ethnic Tibetans. The authorities also cancelled the annual Larung Gar festival of Tibetans.

On July 22, the Los Angeles Times reported that the demolition was being carried out after "two major government meetings during which the Chinese Communist Party general secretary Xi Jinping stressed 'national unity' and the necessity for religious groups to support the Communist Party and 'merge their religious doctrines with Chinese culture'." Also quoted was Robert Barnett, a Tibet scholar at Columbia University. He said this was indicative of the social unrest in Tibet, "We’ve had – what is it? – five years of self-immolations, massive protests in 2008 and so on. The language of resistance is rife throughout China and Tibet."

By November 2016, about 3000 monks and nuns had been forcibly evicted, and around 1000 residences had been destroyed by bulldozers. At least 900 evicted nuns and monks were transported directly to political re-education centers or were detained in a "re-education" camp. Another 300 evicted nuns and monks were required to report to the prefectures in their hometowns for political re-education. Reports also state the evicted monks and nuns are prohibited from joining their local monasteries and nunneries.

On December 6, 2016, the Tibetan government-in-exile's Central Tibetan Administration urged the United Nations to intervene on the issue.

On December 8, 2016, the European Parliament adopted an urgency resolution condemning the dismantling of Larung Gar and the forced evictions of the residents, the forced enrollment in "patriotic education" exercises, and the resulting suicides by evicted nuns.

In 2016, Tibetan Buddhist nuns Tsering Dolma and Semgha died by suicide at Larung Gar as Chinese authorities carried out demolitions and evictions at the institute. Tsering Dolma left a note describing her distress over restrictions on religious practice and the destruction of monastic shelters.

Another demolition order from the Chinese government was publicized on March 12, 2017, for 3,225 residences, according to a March 23 statement from a Larung Gar senior khenpo speaking with Human Rights Watch. The Khenpo also stated 4,500 residents had been forced to leave. A report from March 2017 states the dismantling was reported as part of a rebuilding project that the local government was carrying out in order to make the academy fire- and earthquake-safe. A report in August 2017 found that the demolitions were still being continued, not due to overpopulation – the area is expansive – but because of a government program to turn the sacred site into a 'tourist attraction'. Thousands of Tibetans had already been displaced, while a Han Chinese migration program to the area continued. The report also found that the Tibetans whose houses were destroyed were forced to sign documents that legally bound them to renounce their land rights in Larung Gar. Afterward, they were sent away via buses without notice on where they will be relocated.

International condemnation of China's demolitions and evictions at Larung Gar and Yarchen Gar continued in 2017 by six United Nations human rights experts, during an unusual collaboration.

In mid-July 2026, Chinese authorities began another round of demolitions at Larung Gar, affecting more than 1,000 monastic residences. The operation has continued daily, accompanied by restrictions on movement, visitors and communication, limiting independent information about the demolitions and the fate of displaced residents.

== Political re-education ==
The Chinese "patriotic re-education" programs began at Larung Gar for resident monks and nuns in April 2001.

The Tibetan Review, a Delhi, India-based journal, reports that according to a local resident, 100 nuns and monks studying at Larung Gar Buddhist Academy and residing in Larung Gar were bused to government facilities at Nyingchi after their residences were demolished in 2016 when China began carrying out a forced downsizing of the monastic center earlier that year, leading to their subsequent forced evictions. The Tibetan Review notes that most have returned home after two months, but some were reportedly under continued political re-education.

Another 500 nuns were reported as taken from the region and sent to a patriotic re-education camp, where a video was made while the nuns were forced to chant hymns of loyalty to communism.

In a related report by Human Rights Watch (HRW), in November 2016, the authorities forced at least one group of monks and nuns from Larung Gar or the nearby religious community at Yarchen Gar to undergo political re-education and "apparent public humiliation" in Nyingchi. The report also refers to a video in which 12 Tibetan nuns, dressed in religious robes, are dancing on a stage in front of ostensibly an audience of officials. HRW says that the timing and circumstances of the video indicate that the women are Tibetan nuns expelled in 2016 from Larung Gar or Yarchen Gar.

Free Tibet, the organization which released the video, says that since nuns and monks are not allowed to dance or sing in their robes for entertainment in accordance with Tibetan Buddhist teachings, the video seems to indicate that they were most likely forced to participate in the performance. By early December, a nearby re-education camp in Sertar, Karze prefecture for more than 800 nuns from Larung Gar was reported as ready for detained nuns. The report is further supported by satellite images from Apollo Mapping, a company in Boulder, Colorado, which provided images for the 2017 joint Tibet Watch and Free Tibet report.

The joint report also states another 2,000 nuns were offered residences in unspecified "other institutions in Sertar County" and other counties, on September 23, if they left voluntarily within five days.

In October 2020, a joint statement by 39 countries was read at the United Nations general assembly on human rights, which compare human rights abuses in Tibet to those in Xinjiang. The Associated Press states the countries "criticized China's treatment of minority groups, especially in Xinjiang and Tibet" and that

The predominantly Western statement said its 39 signatories shared the concerns expressed by 50 independent U.N. human rights experts in an 'extraordinary letter' in June in which they urged the international community to 'take all appropriate measures' to monitor China and 'act collectively and decisively' to ensure its government respects human rights.

A report in Foreign Policy by Kelsang Dolma states that Tibet was the laboratory for human rights violations which Chen Quanguo imported to Xinjiang, while Cultural Anthropologist Carole McGranahan authenticated a Tibetan torture journal which also corresponds to Chinese torture tactics used on Uyghurs at Xinjiang.
