= Xuri Township =

Xuri Township 旭日乡
- Township
- Location in Sichuan
- Coordinates: 31°59′33″N 100°40′47″E
- Country: People's Republic of China
- Province: Sichuan
- Autonomous prefecture: Garzê Tibetan Autonomous Prefecture
- County: Sêrtar County
- Time zone: UTC+8 (China Standard)

Xuri Township (simplified Chinese: 旭日乡; traditional Chinese: 旭日鄉; pinyin: Xùrì Xiāng) is a township under the administration of Sêrtar County, Sichuan, China. As of 2018, it has six villages under its administration.
