= Yarchen Gar =

Tibetan Buddhist monastery in Baiyü County, Sichuan, China

Coordinates: 30.9425°N 99.6074°E

Yachen Orgyen Samden Ling, known as Yarchen Gar, before 2019 demolitions

Yarchen Gar (Tibetan: ཡ་ཆེན་སྒར་, Wylie: ya chen sgar, 亚青寺), officially known as "Yaqên Orgyän Temple" (Tibetan: ཡ་ཆེན་ཨོ་རྒྱན་བསམ་གདན་གླིང་།, THL: Yachen Orgyen Samden Ling), is a Tibetan Buddhist monastery of the Nyingma school, with an educational institute and residential community in western Sichuan, China. The majority of its Tibetan and Chinese residents are nuns, leading to it being called the "City of Nuns". By the end of 2019, more than half of their residences had been demolished by Chinese authorities.

== Location and history ==
Yarchen Gar lies 4000m above sea level in an isolated valley of Pelyul County, 400 kilometres (250 mi) west of Chengdu in the Garzê Tibetan Autonomous Prefecture, known as Kham. At its height, its sangha of an estimated 10,000 nuns, monks and lay practitioners was considered the largest concentration of monastics in the world.

The monastery is dedicated to the preservation of Tibetan Buddhist culture after the Cultural Revolution. The nuns at Yarchen Gar are also known for their practice of Tummo in the winter, in individual retreat cabins on the hillsides.

== Demolitions and re-education ==
Owing to the expanding influence of Tibetan Buddhism, the monks and nuns of Yarchen Gar are seen as a threat to Chinese plans to "sinicinize religions". Evictions of monks and nuns began in 2001 after residences were demolished. In August 2017, a further 2000 residences were torn down and a similar number of nuns and monks evicted by Chinese authorities.

The monastery has periodically been closed to foreigners, and was again closed in April 2019. In the following month of May, forced removals of 7,000 residents began, and in July at least 3,000 nuns' residences were demolished. By August 2019, a large swathe of the nun's area had been cleared, likely to pave the way for tourist infrastructure according to Free Tibet.

The evicted nuns and monks were then detained in political re-education centers and forced to participate in patriotic exercises. There have been reports of sexual violence being used against nuns and of torture of both nuns and monks. About seventy nuns and monks were confined in Jomda County and forced to undergo "patriotic re-education", during which nuns were beaten and not allowed to wear their robes.

A similar program was carried out at another monastery, Larung Gar. Many of the evicted monks and nuns from Larung Gar subsequently relocated to Yarchen Gar.

In 2017, China's demolitions and evictions were condemned by six United Nations human rights experts in an unusual collaboration. The U.S. Department of State expressed concern over the ongoing destruction at Yarchen Gar and Larung Gar in 2018.
