= Sêrtar County =

County in Sichuan, Tibet, China

Sêrtar County 色达县 · གསེར་ཐར་རྫོང། Serthar, Sêrda, Seda
- County

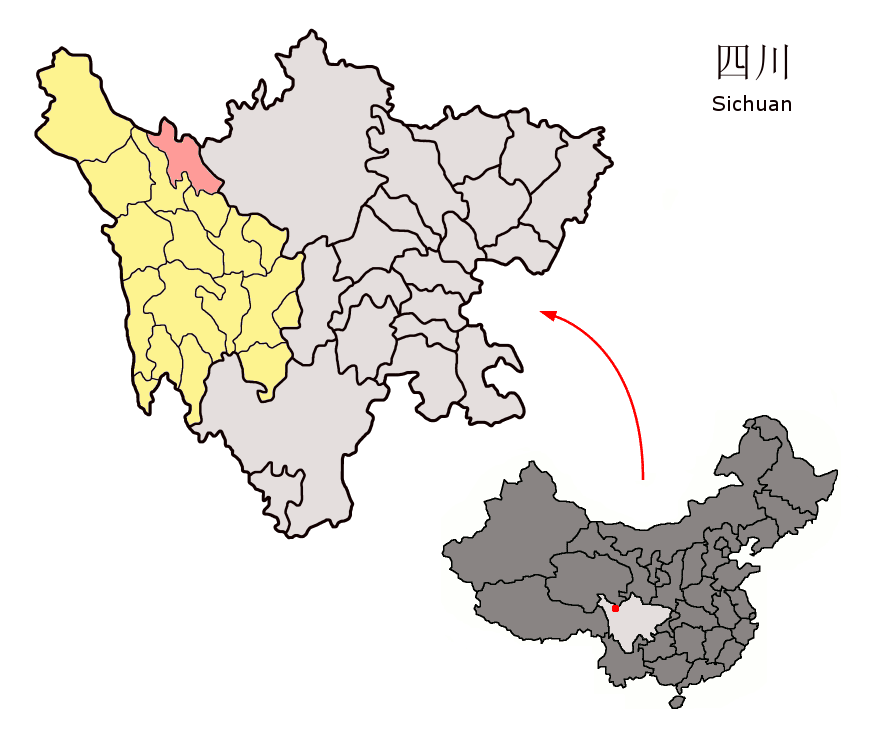
- Location of Sêrtar County (red) within Garzê Prefecture (yellow) and Sichuan

- Location of the seat in Sichuan Sêrtar (China)
- Coordinates: 32°16′05″N 100°19′58″E
- Country: China
- Province: Sichuan
- Autonomous prefecture: Garzê
- County seat: Sêrkog (Seke)

Area
  - Total: 9,338.98 km^{2} (3,605.80 sq mi)
- Elevation: 4,127 m (13,540 ft)

Population (2020)
  - Total: 64,681
  - Density: 6.9259/km^{2} (17.938/sq mi)
  - Major nationalities: Tibetan Han Salar Hui
- Time zone: UTC+8 (China Standard)
- Postal code: 626600
- Area code: 0836
- Website: www.sdzf.gov.cn

Sêrtar County

Chinese name
- Simplified Chinese: 色达县
- Traditional Chinese: 色達縣
Transcriptions
Standard Mandarin
- Hanyu Pinyin: Sèdá Xiàn

Tibetan name
- Tibetan: གསེར་ཐར་རྫོང། or གསེར་རྟ་རྫོང་།
Transcriptions
- Wylie: gser-thar rdzong or gser rta rdzong
- Tibetan Pinyin: Sêrtar Zong or Sêrda Zong

Sêrtar or Serthar County (Tibetan: གསེར་ཐར་རྫོང།), also known by its Chinese name as Seda County (色达县, Sèdá Xiàn) is a county in the northwest of Sichuan Province, China, bordering Qinghai province to the north. It is one of the 18 counties under the administration of the Garzê Tibetan Autonomous Prefecture, covering some 9,340 square kilometres or 3,606 square miles. Sêrtar, which means "golden freedom" in Tibetan, lies in the southeast of the Tibetan Plateau and in the historical region of Amdo. The vast majority of the population is Tibetan, followed by Han Chinese.

Sêrtar comprises 17 towns and 66 villages. It is home to the Larung Gar Buddhist Institute, the largest Tibetan Buddhist institute in the world. The institute, which was founded by lama Jigme Phuntsok in 1980 and started off with just a few monks, now houses tens of thousands of monks and pilgrims from around the world, which constitute the vast majority of the Sêrtar population. Most monks spend six to 13 years completing their training. The institute, divided into two main segments and spread over just a few square kilometres, is located in a valley and around 15 kilometres from the town of Sêrtar. A permit is occasionally required for non-Chinese nationals to enter the institute.

Sêrtar is remotely located and requires more than half a day's driving if travelling from Chengdu via Maerkang. It is also possible to travel from Xining, the capital of Qinghai. Sêrtar is at an altitude of around 4,100 metres or 13,500 feet above sea level. Temperatures range between a maximum of 30 °C or 86 °F in the summer and a minimum of −30 °C or −22 °F in the winter.

== Incidents ==
Sêrtar is one of the places in Sichuan that witnesses occasional acts of self-immolation, usually carried out by Tibetans. For instance, in February 2012, three herders set themselves on fire, purportedly in protest. On 26 November 2012, a monk allegedly self-immolated in front of the golden horse statue in Larung Gar. The supposedly political motivation behind these acts, however, has always been disputed by the Chinese government.

As many of the houses in Larung Gar are made of wood, they present a constant fire hazard. On the evening of 10 January 2014, a fire broke out in Larung Gar, burning down more than a dozen structures and requiring 450 rescue workers to respond to the scene; however, there were no serious casualties.

== Administrative divisions ==
Sêrtar County is divided into 5 towns and 11 townships.

Name	Simplified Chinese	Hanyu Pinyin	Tibetan	Wylie	Administrative division code
Towns
Sêrkog Town (Seke)	色柯镇	Sèkē Zhèn	གསེར་ཁོག་གྲོང་རྡལ།	gser khog grong rdal	513333100
Bomda Town (Wungda, Wengda)	翁达镇	Wēngdá Zhèn	སྦོ་མདའ་གྲོང་རྡལ།	sbo mda' grong rdal	513333101
Nubsur Town (Larung, Luoruo)	洛若镇	Luòruò Zhèn	གནུབས་ཟུར་གྲོང་རྡལ།	gnubs zur grong rdal	513333102
Nyidoi Town (Niduo)	泥朵镇	Níduǒ Zhèn	སྙི་སྟོད་གྲོང་རྡལ།	snyi stod grong rdal	513333103
Gyaxoi Town (Jiaxue)	甲学镇	Jiǎxué Zhèn	རྒྱ་ཤོད་གྲོང་བརྡལ།	rgya shod grong brdal	513333104
Townships
Kêgor Township (Keguo)	克果乡	Kèguǒ Xiāng	ཁེས་སྐོར་ཡུལ་ཚོ།	khes skor yul tsho	513333201
Ragzham Township (Razham, Ranchong)	然充乡	Ránchōng Xiāng	རགས་བཀྲམ་ཡུལ་ཚོ།	rags bkram yul tsho	513333202
Kainlêb Township (Karlêb, Kangle)	康勒乡	Kānglè Xiāng	མཁན་ལེབ་ཡུལ་ཚོ།	mkhan leb yul tsho	513333203
Darcang Township (Dazhang)	大章乡	Dàzhāng Xiāng	བརྡར་ཚང་ཡུལ་ཚོ།	brdar tshang yul tsho	513333204
Dagzê Township (Daze)	大则乡	Dàzé Xiāng	སྟག་རྩེ་ཡུལ་ཚོ།	stag rtse yul tsho	513333205
Yarlung Township (Yalong)	亚龙乡	Yàlóng Xiāng	ཡར་ལུང་ཡུལ་ཚོ།	yar lung yul tsho	513333206
Qogcang Township (Tazi)	塔子乡	Tǎzǐ Xiāng	མཆོག་ཚང་ཡུལ་ཚོ།	mchog tshang yul tsho	513333207
Nyainlung Township (Nianlong)	年龙乡	Niánlóng Xiāng	སྙན་ལུང་ཡུལ་ཚོ།	snyan lung yul tsho	513333208
Horxü Township (Huoxi)	霍西乡	Huòxī Xiāng	ཧོར་ཤུལ་ཡུལ་ཚོ།	hor shul yul tsho	513333210
Xêchub Township (Xuri)	旭日乡	Xùrì Xiāng	ཤེལ་གྲུབ་ཡུལ་ཚོ།	shel grub yul tsho	513333211
Yanggo Township (Yangge)	杨各乡	Yánggè Xiāng	ཡང་འོ་ཡུལ་ཚོ།	yang 'o yul tsho	513333212

== Gallery ==
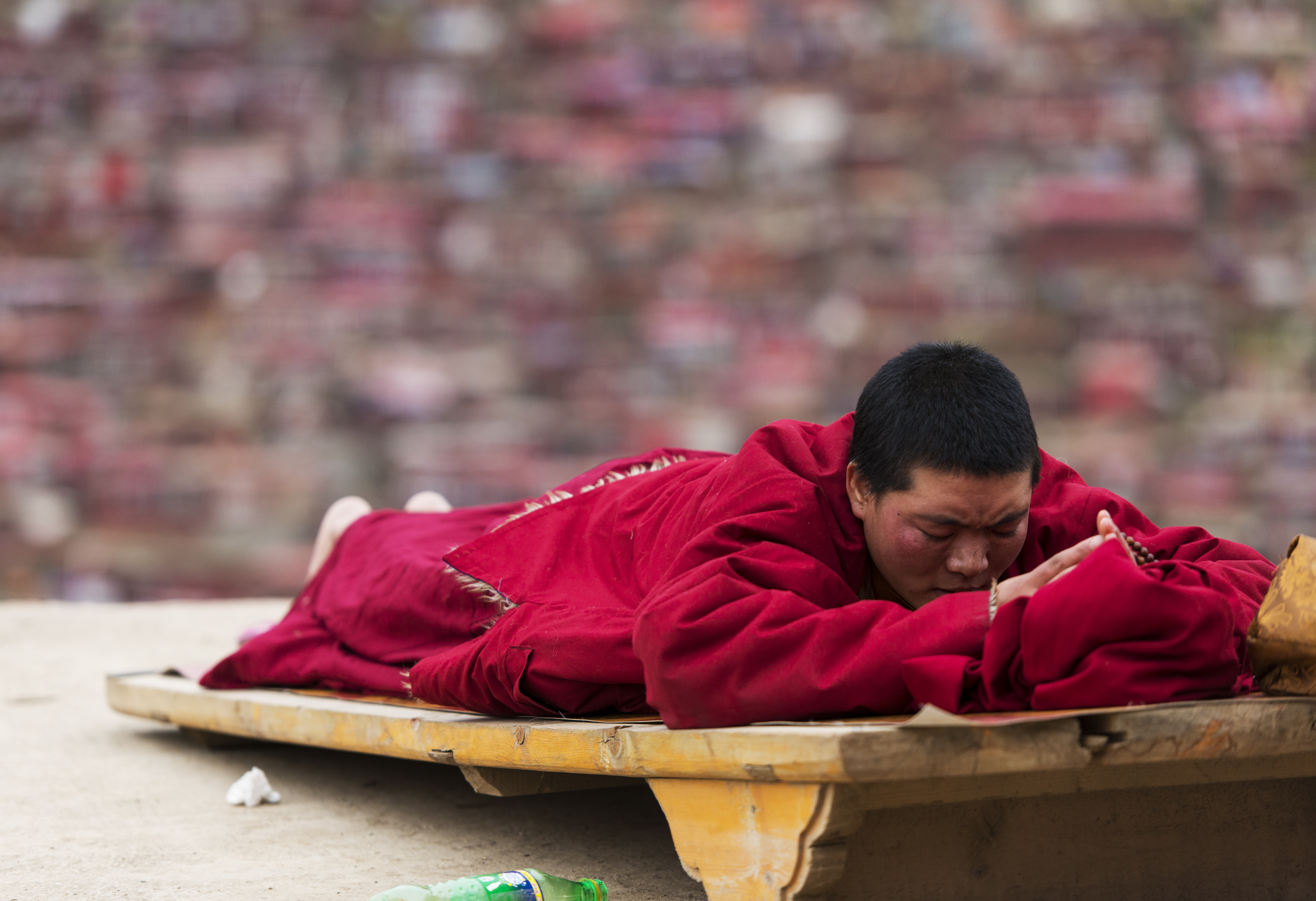
A monk prostrating at a shrine

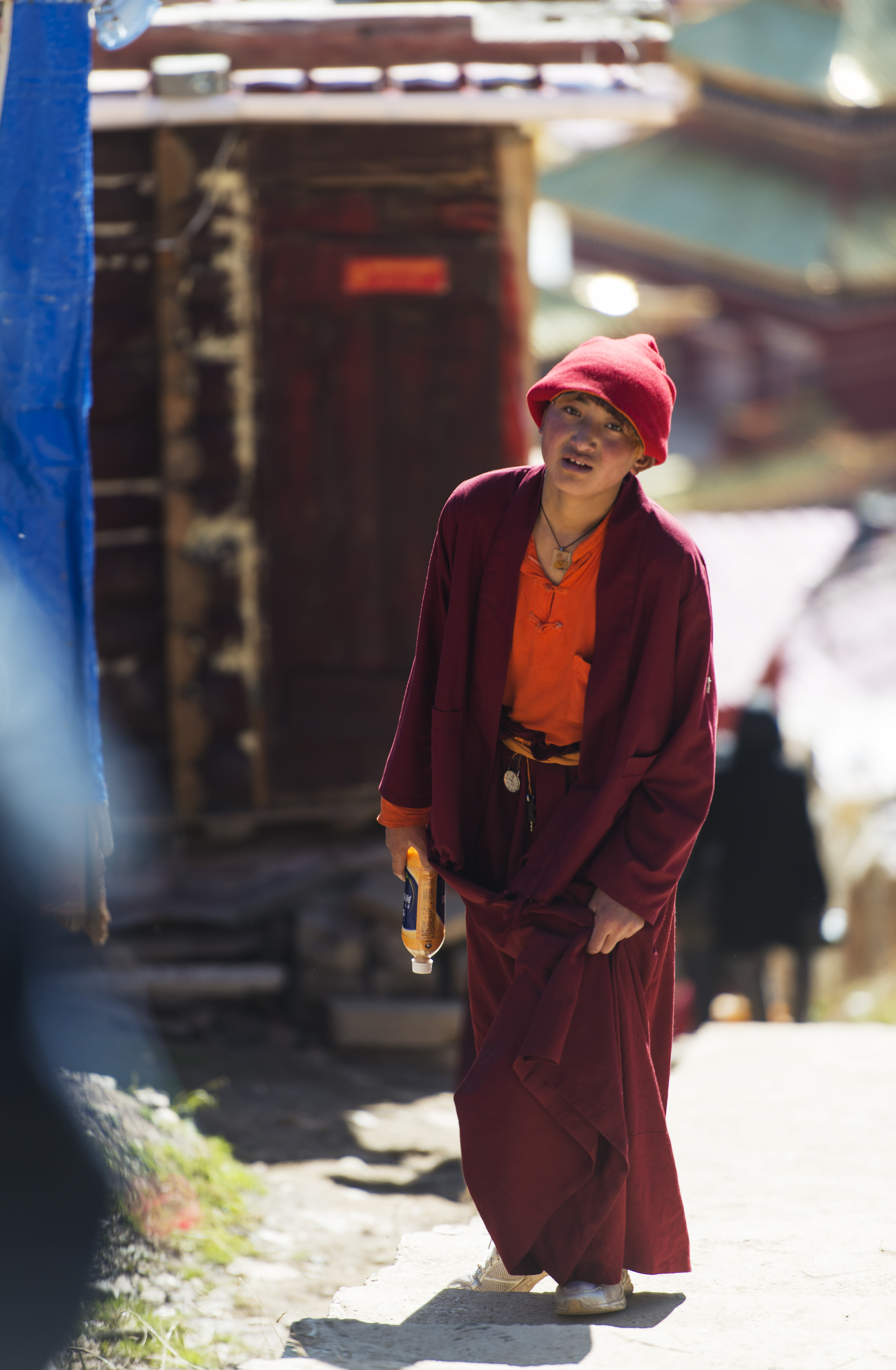
A nun walking the alleys

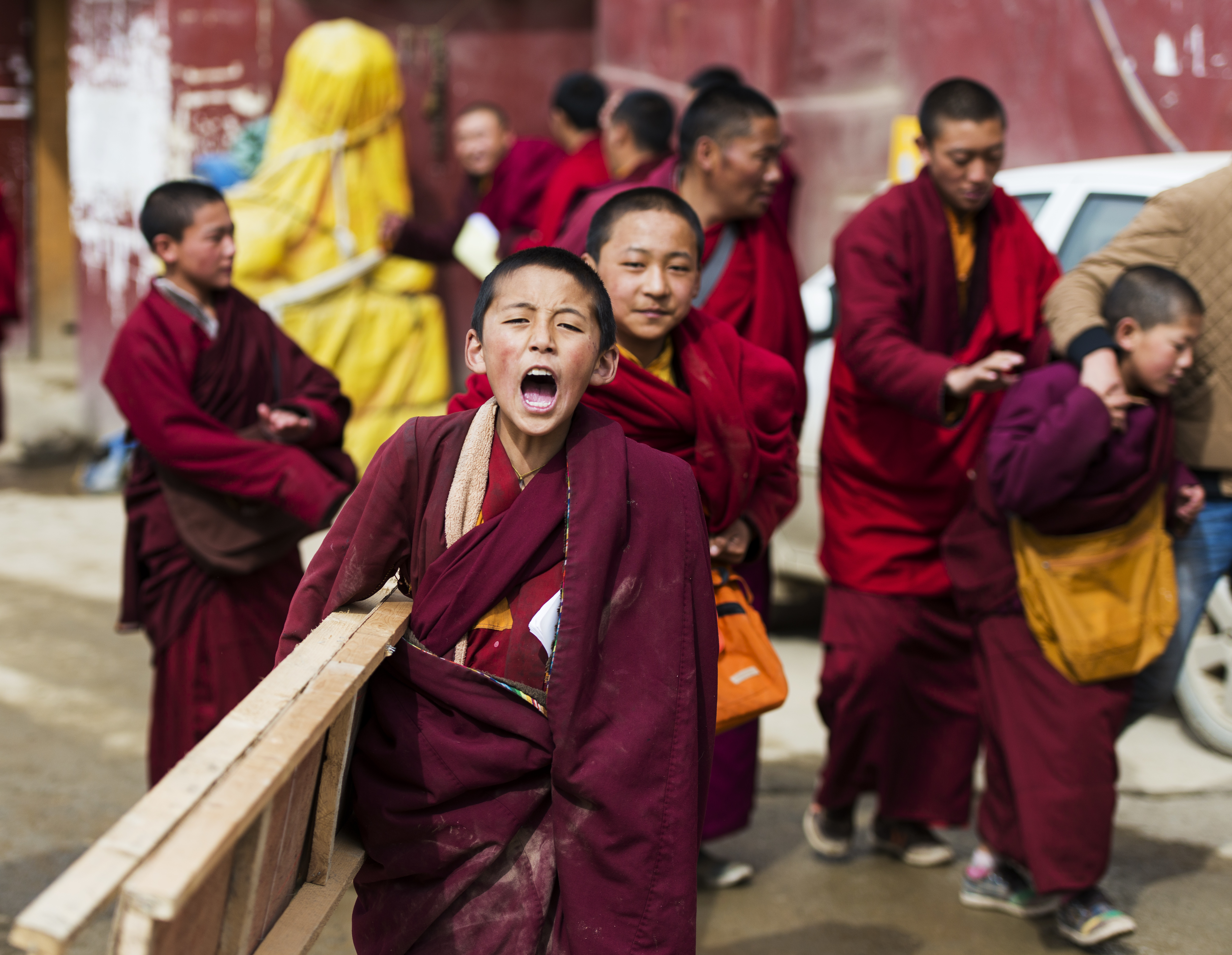
Children monks

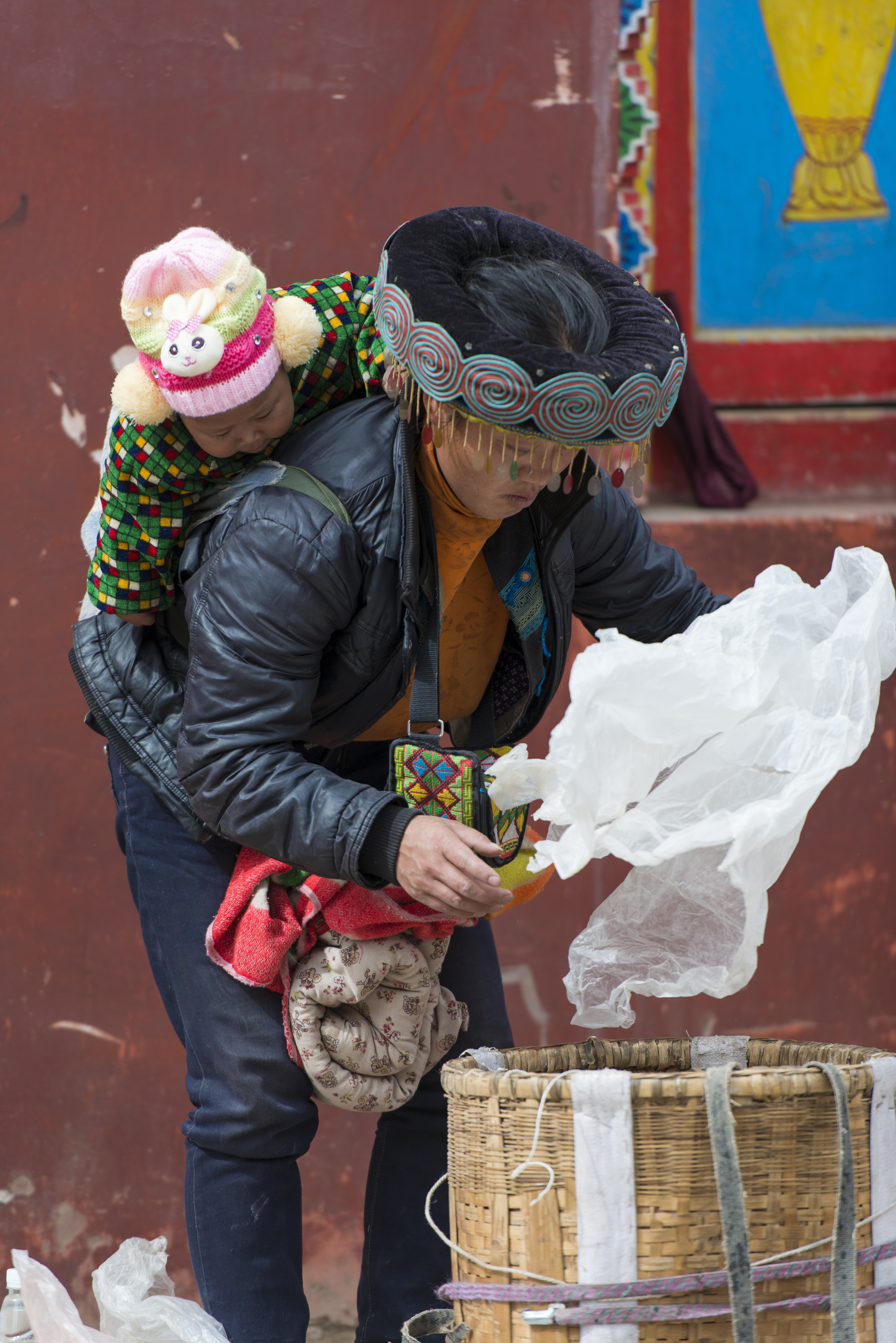
A worker and her child

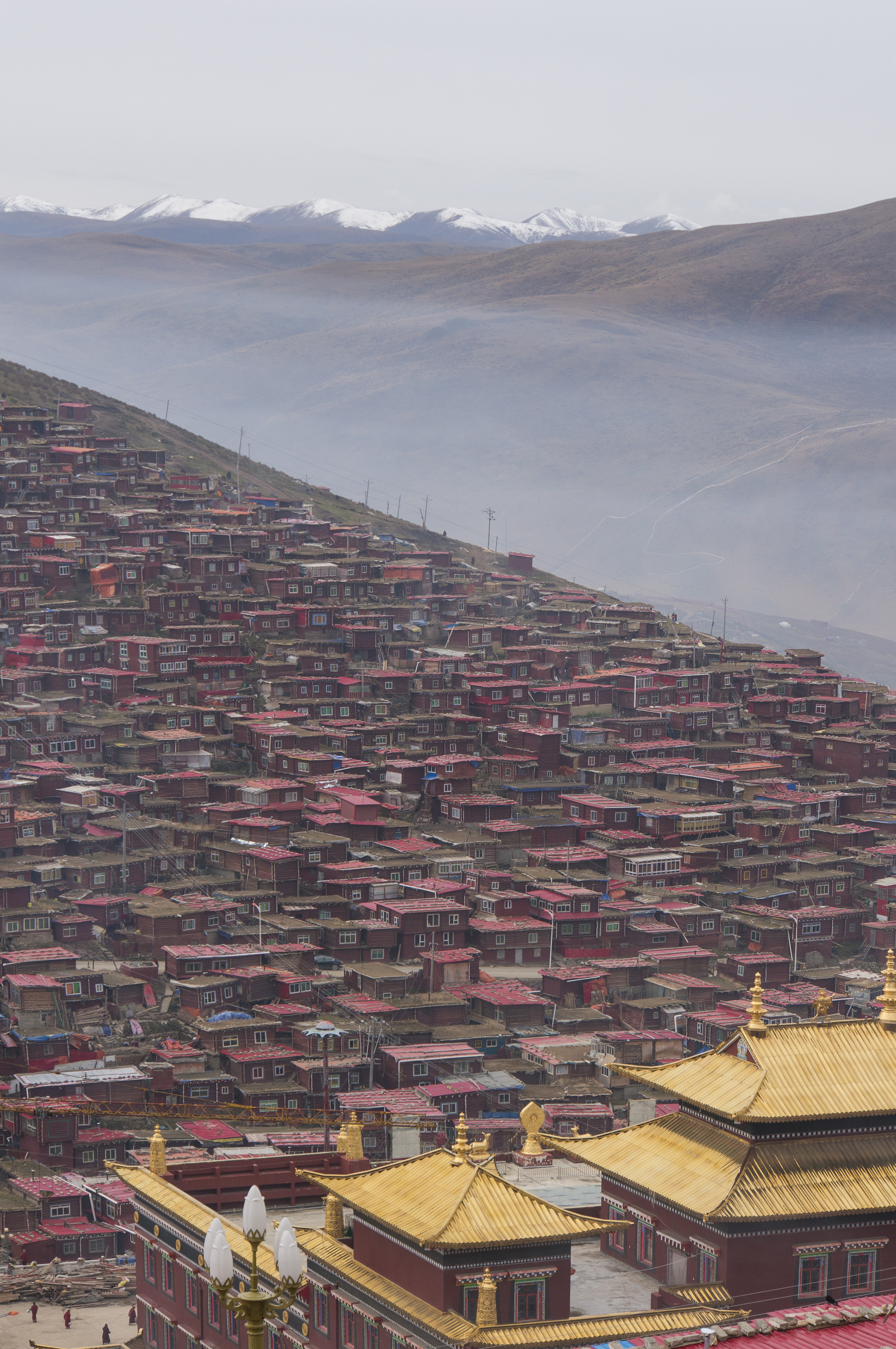
With the mountain ranges in the background

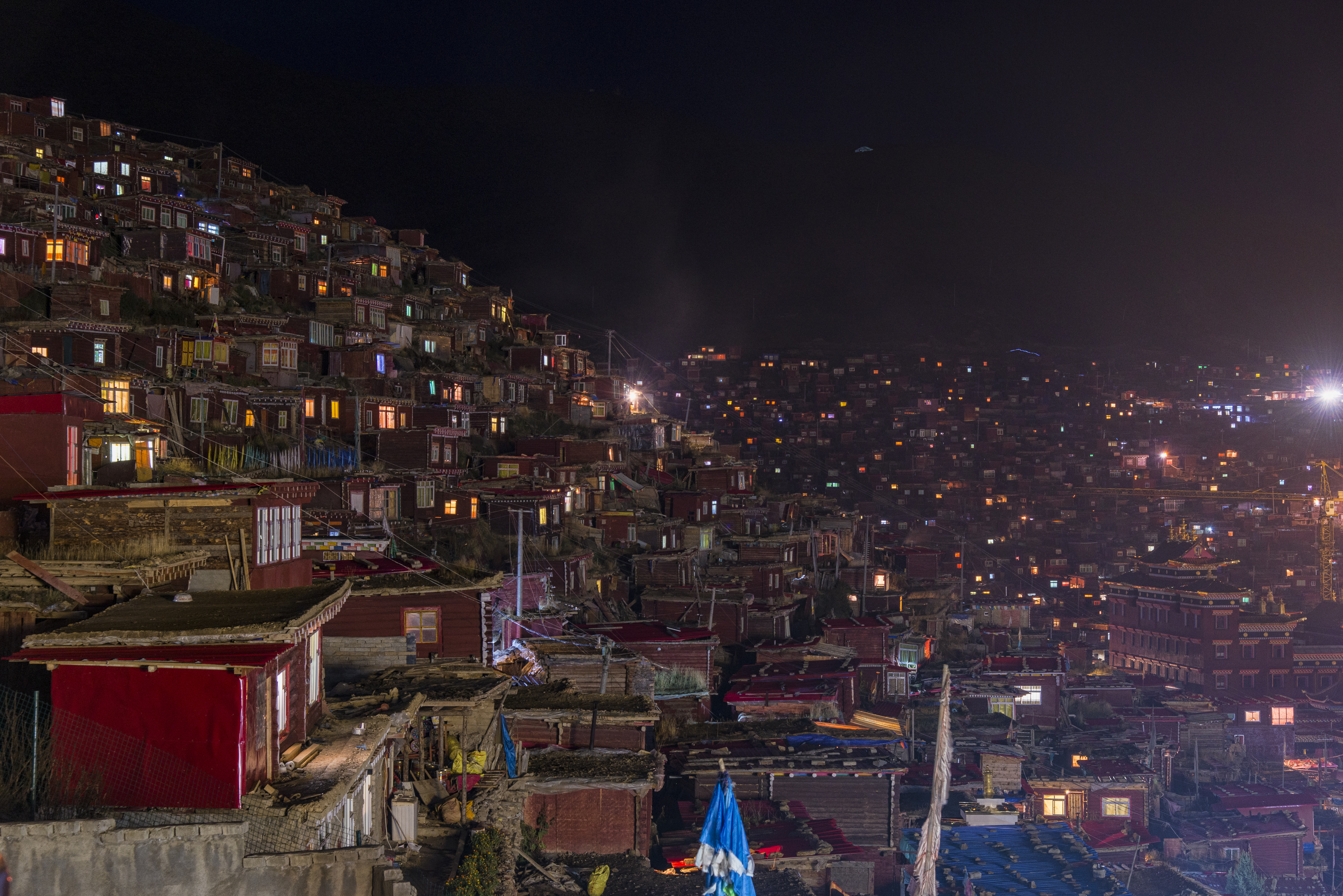
Sêrtar at night

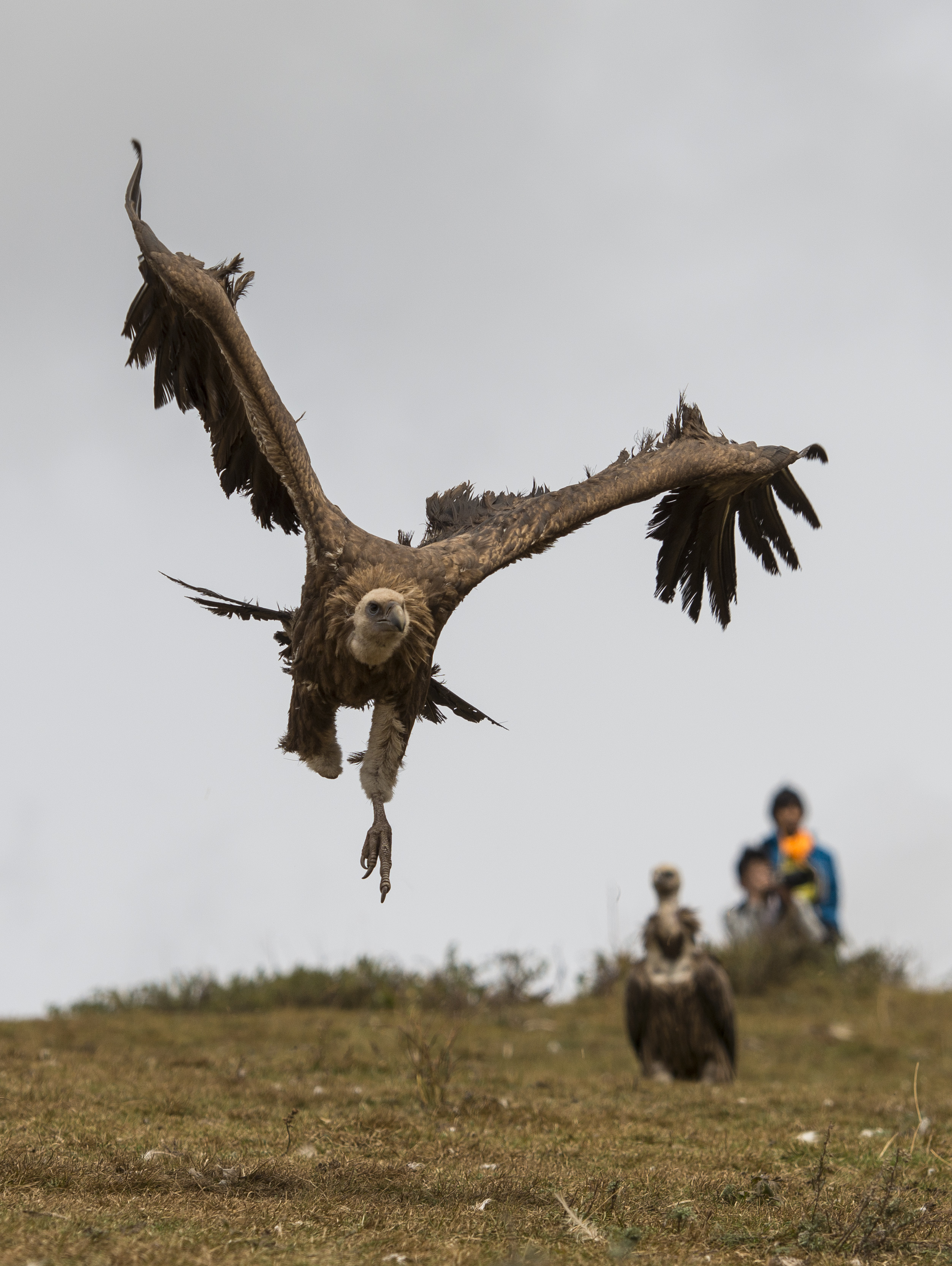
Vulture in flight during a sky burial

== Panoramas ==
Panorama of Sêrtar, facing north

Panorama of Sêrtar, facing south

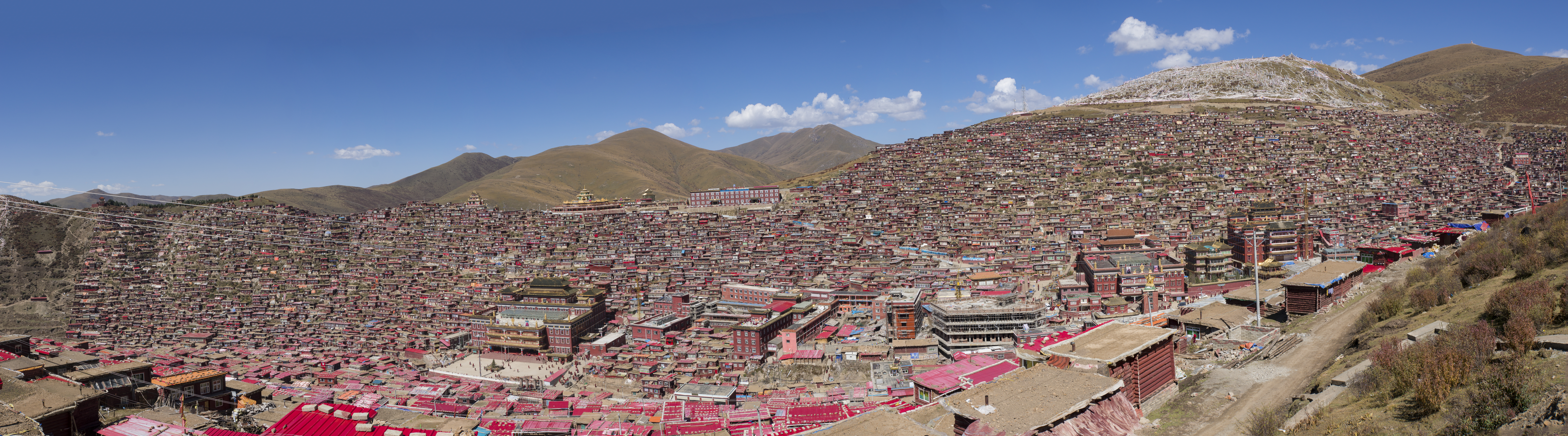
Panorama of Sêrtar, facing east

== Climate ==
Sêrtar County has a dry-winter subalpine climate (Köppen Dwc), closely bordering upon an alpine climate (ETH). Summers are mild and rainy, whereas winters are frigid, dry, and clear with large diurnal temperature ranges.

Climate data for Sêrtar, elevation 3,894 m (12,776 ft), (1991–2020 normals, extremes 1981–present)
Month	Jan	Feb	Mar	Apr	May	Jun	Jul	Aug	Sep	Oct	Nov	Dec	Year
Record high °C (°F)	15.5 (59.9)	14.1 (57.4)	17.4 (63.3)	20.5 (68.9)	22.5 (72.5)	23.6 (74.5)	26.2 (79.2)	23.7 (74.7)	23.0 (73.4)	20.9 (69.6)	16.7 (62.1)	13.1 (55.6)	26.2 (79.2)
Mean daily maximum °C (°F)	1.5 (34.7)	3.5 (38.3)	6.2 (43.2)	9.7 (49.5)	13.4 (56.1)	15.9 (60.6)	17.5 (63.5)	17.3 (63.1)	15.2 (59.4)	10.2 (50.4)	5.6 (42.1)	2.5 (36.5)	9.9 (49.8)
Daily mean °C (°F)	−9.9 (14.2)	−7.0 (19.4)	−3.0 (26.6)	1.6 (34.9)	5.6 (42.1)	9.1 (48.4)	10.6 (51.1)	9.9 (49.8)	7.3 (45.1)	1.9 (35.4)	−4.5 (23.9)	−9.0 (15.8)	1.1 (33.9)
Mean daily minimum °C (°F)	−18.8 (−1.8)	−15.4 (4.3)	−10.2 (13.6)	−4.8 (23.4)	−0.5 (31.1)	3.9 (39.0)	5.2 (41.4)	4.3 (39.7)	1.9 (35.4)	−3.5 (25.7)	−11.4 (11.5)	−17.3 (0.9)	−5.6 (22.0)
Record low °C (°F)	−32.2 (−26.0)	−28.1 (−18.6)	−23.4 (−10.1)	−15.9 (3.4)	−9.7 (14.5)	−6.3 (20.7)	−3.3 (26.1)	−6.5 (20.3)	−8.3 (17.1)	−15.7 (3.7)	−28.9 (−20.0)	−32.0 (−25.6)	−32.2 (−26.0)
Average precipitation mm (inches)	4.1 (0.16)	7.3 (0.29)	18.2 (0.72)	31.2 (1.23)	69.8 (2.75)	145.2 (5.72)	139.3 (5.48)	114.1 (4.49)	107.1 (4.22)	45.0 (1.77)	7.5 (0.30)	3.4 (0.13)	692.2 (27.26)
Average precipitation days (≥ 0.1 mm)	4.2	6.5	11.1	13.9	19.1	23.4	21.2	19.2	19.8	14.9	5.0	3.6	161.9
Average snowy days	6.7	9.9	15.1	17.8	12.6	1.9	0.2	0.3	2.8	15.1	8.1	5.3	95.8
Average relative humidity (%)	51	53	57	62	66	72	74	75	76	72	62	54	65
Mean monthly sunshine hours	208.2	179.9	194.7	203.8	202.7	177.5	197.8	197.3	179.5	180.0	210.0	221.0	2,352.4
Percentage possible sunshine	65	57	52	52	47	42	46	48	49	52	67	71	54
Source: China Meteorological Administration
