= Khenpo =

Tibetan Buddhism degree

The term khenpo (Tib. མཁན་པོ། mkhen po), or khenmo (in the feminine) is a degree for higher Buddhist studies given in Tibetan Buddhism. In the Nyingma, Kagyu, and Sakya traditions, the title is awarded usually after a period of 13 years of intensive study after secondary school. It may roughly translate to either a bachelor's degree, or nowadays more likely to a terminal degree in Buddhist Studies equivalent to a PhD or MPhil. The degree is awarded to students who can publicly defend their erudition and mastery in at least five subjects of Indo-Tibetan Buddhism, namely Prajñāpāramitā, Madhyamaka, Pramāṇa, Abhidharma, and Vinaya. After successfully passing their examination, they are entitled to serve as teachers of Buddhism.

Similar titles of lower standing are De Nod Dzin Pa, and Shor Phon. In the Gelug tradition, the title khenpo refers to either a senior monk who ordains new monastics, or the abbot of a monastery. A comparable title in the Gelug and Bon lineages is Geshe.

In some sanghas, a khenchen (Tib. མཁན་ཆེན། 'great khenpo') is a senior khenpo or a title applied to the most respected khenpos.
